= List of railway stations in Basilicata =

This is the list of railway stations in Basilicata, Italy. The stations are owned by Rete Ferroviaria Italiana (RFI) (a branch of the Italian state company Ferrovie dello Stato), and Ferrovie Appulo Lucane (FAL).

== RFI stations ==
Station	Locality	Province	Category
Acquafredda	Maratea	Potenza	Bronze
Albano di Lucania	Albano di Lucania	Potenza	Bronze
Avigliano Lucania	Potenza	Potenza	Bronze
Balvano-Ricigliano	Balvano	Potenza	Bronze
Baragiano-Ruoti	Baragiano	Potenza	Bronze
Barile	Barile	Potenza	Bronze
Bella Muro	Bella	Potenza	Bronze
Bernalda	Bernalda	Matera	Bronze
Castel Lagopesole	Castel Lagopesole	Potenza	Bronze
Ferrandina	Ferrandina	Matera	Bronze
Filiano	Filiano	Potenza	Bronze
Forenza	Forenza	Potenza	Bronze
Franciosa	Franciosa	Potenza	Bronze
Grassano-Garaguso-Tricarico	Grassano	Matera	Bronze
Maratea	Maratea	Potenza	Silver
Marina di Maratea	Marina di Maratea	Potenza	Bronze
Melfi	Melfi	Potenza	Silver
Metaponto	Metaponto	Matera	Silver
Nova Siri-Rotondella	Nova Siri	Matera	Bronze
Palazzo San Gervasio-Montemilone	Palazzo San Gervasio	Potenza	Bronze
Picerno	Picerno	Potenza	Bronze
Pietragalla	Pietragalla	Potenza	Bronze
Pisticci	Pisticci	Matera	Bronze
Policoro-Tursi	Policoro	Matera	Bronze
Possidente	Possidente	Potenza	Bronze
Potenza Centrale	Potenza	Potenza	Gold
Potenza Macchia Romana	Potenza	Potenza	Bronze
Potenza Superiore	Potenza	Potenza	Silver
Potenza Università	Potenza	Potenza	Bronze
Rapone-Ruvo-S.Fele	Rapone	Potenza	Bronze
Rionero-Atella-Ripacandida	Rionero in Vulture	Potenza	Silver
San Nicola di Melfi	San Nicola di Melfi	Potenza	Bronze
Salandra-Grottole	Salandra	Matera	Bronze
Scanzano Jonico-Montalbano Jonico	Scanzano Jonico	Matera	Bronze
Tito	Tito	Potenza	Bronze
Trivigno	Trivigno	Potenza	Bronze
Venosa-Maschito	Venosa	Potenza	Bronze

== FAL stations ==
Station	Locality	Province
Acerenza	Acerenza	Potenza
Avigliano Città	Avigliano	Potenza
Cancellara	Cancellara	Potenza
Genzano	Genzano di Lucania	Potenza
Irsina	Irsina	Matera
Matera Centrale	Matera	Matera
Matera Serra Rifusa	Matera	Matera
Matera Sud	Matera	Matera
Matera Villa Longo	Matera	Matera
Moccaro	Avigliano	Potenza
Pietragalla	Pietragalla	Potenza
Potenza Città	Potenza	Potenza
Potenza Inferiore	Potenza	Potenza
Potenza Macchia Romana	Potenza	Potenza
Potenza Rione Mancusi	Potenza	Potenza
Potenza San Rocco	Potenza	Potenza
Potenza Santa Maria	Potenza	Potenza
Potenza Scalo	Potenza	Potenza
Ripa d'Api	Genzano di Lucania	Potenza
San Nicola	Potenza	Potenza
Taccone	Irsina	Matera
Tarantella	Acerenza	Potenza
Tiera	Potenza	Potenza
Venusio	Matera	Matera

== See also ==
- Railway stations in Italy
- Ferrovie dello Stato
- Rail transport in Italy
- High-speed rail in Italy
- Transport in Italy
