= Strada statale 407 Basentana =

State highway in Italy

State Highway 407
- Strada statale 407
- Basentana

Route information
- Maintained by ANAS
- Length: 101.0 km (62.8 mi)
- Existed: 1961–present

Major junctions
- From: SS 7 at Potenza
- To: SS 106 at Metaponto

Location
- Country: Italy
- Regions: Basilicata

Highway system
- Roads in Italy; Autostrade; State; Regional; Provincial; Municipal
← SS 402	→ SS 410

Strada statale 407 Basentana (SS 407) is an Italian state highway 101.0 kilometres (62.8 mi) long in Italy in the region of Basilicata that follows the course of the Basento river from Potenza to Metaponto.

== Route ==
Basentana
Exit	km	Province!
Variante di Potenza Sicignano degli Alburni - del Mediterraneo - Salerno	0.0 km (0 mi)	PZ
Vaglio Basilicata - Tolve - San Chirico Nuovo - Bari; Via Appia	0.0 km (0 mi)	PZ
Melfi - Rionero in Vulture; Potenza-Melfi	1.5 km (0.93 mi)	PZ
Scalo Vaglio Basilicata; Potenza-Melfi	2.0 km (1.2 mi)	PZ
SC Molino	3.4 km (2.1 mi)	PZ
Vaglio Basilicata; Zona industriale	5.9 km (3.7 mi)	PZ
C.da Isca d'Ecclesia	6.6 km (4.1 mi)	PZ
Parco La Grancia	9.6 km (6.0 mi)	PZ
Brindisi Montagna - Vaglio Basilicata	11.3 km (7.0 mi)	PZ / MT
Trivigno	15.6 km (9.7 mi)	PZ
Albano di Lucania - Albano Scalo - Castelmezzano - Campomaggiore	19.1 km (11.9 mi)	PZ
Campomaggiore - Pietrapertosa - Accettura - Stigliano	24.8 km (15.4 mi)	PZ
Tricarico	36.4 km (22.6 mi)	MT
Calciano	40.3 km (25.0 mi)	MT
Grassano - Garaguso - Tricarico Scalo ex di Calle	42.4 km (26.3 mi)	MT
Rest area	50.8 km (31.6 mi)	MT
Salandra - Grottole Scalo	51.6 km (32.1 mi)	MT
Rest area	52.3 km (32.5 mi)	MT
Ferrandina railway station	63.5 km (39.5 mi)	MT
Ferrandina Via Appia - Miglionico - Matera - Altamura- Bari; Via Appia	66.2 km (41.1 mi)	MT
Ferrandina; Industrial area	68.5 km (42.6 mi)	MT
Località Macchia- Pisticci	70.9 km (44.1 mi)	MT
Industrial area Termine spartitraffico	76.3 km (47.4 mi)	MT
Rest area	77.3 km (48.0 mi)	MT
Scalo Pisticci - Pisticci della Valle del Basento	78.5 km (48.8 mi)	MT
Marconia-Tinchi	87.3 km (54.2 mi)	MT
Bernalda	92.2 km (57.3 mi)	MT
Rest area	100.0 km (62.1 mi)	MT
Jonica Reggio Calabria; Taranto - Scanzano Jonico - Policoro - Sibari - Corigliano Calabro - Rossano - Crotone - Reggio Calabria	100.4 km (62.4 mi)	MT
Jonica Taranto	100.6 km (62.5 mi)	MT
Metaponto	101.0 km (62.8 mi)	MT

== See also ==
- State highways (Italy)
- Roads in Italy
- Transport in Italy

=== Other Italian roads ===
- Autostrade of Italy
- Regional road (Italy)
- Provincial road (Italy)
- Municipal road (Italy)
