= Basento =

River in Basilicata, Italy

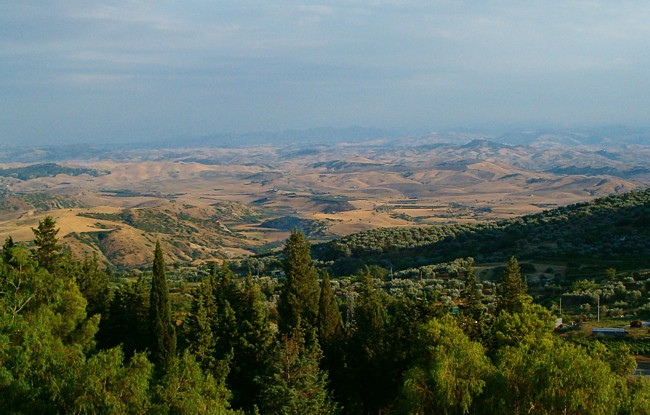

Location
- Country: Italy

Physical characteristics
- Source
  - location: Monte Arioso, Basilicata
  - elevation: 1,722 m (5,650 ft)
- Mouth: Gulf of Taranto
  - coordinates: 40.3371°N 16.8181°E
- Length: 149 km (93 mi)
- Basin size: 1,537 km^{2} (593 sq mi)
- Discharge
  - average: 12.2 m^{3}/s (430 cu ft/s)

The Basento (Latin Casuentus) is a river in the Basilicata region of southern Italy. It rises at Monte Arioso in the southern Apennine Mountains, southwest of Potenza in the province of Potenza. The river flows northeast near Pignola and Potenza before curving east near Vaglio Basilicata. It curves southeast and flows near Brindisi Montagna, Trivigno, and Albano di Lucania. A right tributary coming from Lago di Ponte Fontanelle flows into the river in this area. The river forms the border between the province of Potenza and the province of Matera for a short distance before flowing into the province of Matera. It flows eastward near Tricarico, Calciano, and Grassano before curving southeast. The river flows near Grottole, Miglionico, Pomarico, Ferrandina, and Monte Finese before curving eastward. It flows near Pisticci and Bernalda before flowing into the Gulf of Taranto, which is part of the Ionian Sea, near Metaponto. The main city on the Basento is Potenza, the capital of Basilicata.
