= Potenza Centrale railway station =

Railway station in Italy

Potenza Centrale
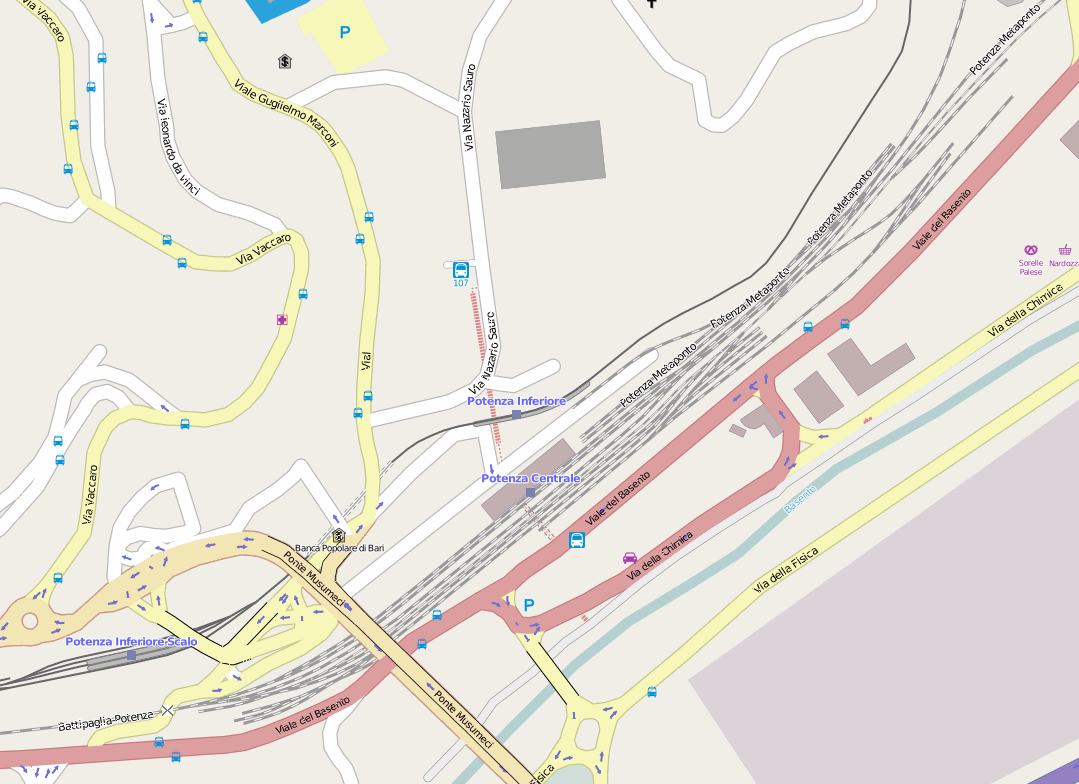
- Station map showing also the nearby FAL stations of Potenza Inferiore and Potenza Inferiore Scalo

General information
- Coordinates: 40°37′46″N 15°48′23″E
- Operator: Trenitalia (Ferrovie Appulo Lucane - see text)
- Lines: Battipaglia–Potenza–Metaponto; Potenza–Foggia
- Distance: 164.098 km (101.966 mi) from Napoli Centrale
- Platforms: 3 (4 tracks)
- Connections: Bus (urban, suburban)

Other information
- Classification: Gold

History
- Opened: 1 September 1880
Location
- Location within Basilicata Location within Italy

Potenza Centrale railway station (Italian: Stazione di Potenza Centrale), formerly known as Potenza Inferiore, is the main station serving the city and comune of Potenza, in the region of Basilicata, southern Italy. Opened in 1880, it forms part of the Battipaglia–Potenza–Metaponto railway and is also a junction of a branch line to Foggia.

== Overview ==
The station is currently managed by Rete Ferroviaria Italiana (RFI). However, the commercial area of the passenger building is managed by Centostazioni. Standard gauge train services are operated by Trenitalia. Each of these companies is a subsidiary of Ferrovie dello Stato (FS), Italy's state-owned rail company.

Narrow gauge train services to the nearby station of "Potenza Inferiore" are operated by Ferrovie Appulo Lucane, a separate company. Another nearby station is "Potenza Inferiore Scalo". Both stations are operated by the local suburban railway.

== Location ==
Potenza Centrale railway station is situated in Piazzale Guglielmo Marconi, to the south of the city centre.

== History ==
The station was opened on 1 September 1880, upon the inauguration of the Picerno–Potenza section of the Battipaglia–Potenza–Metaponto railway, a line linking it directly with Salerno and Taranto.

Until 10 December 2006, it was named Statione di Potenza Inferiore, as it is in the lower elevations of the city, adjacent to the Basento river.

== Features ==
The passenger building is made up of three conjoined sections, each constructed of brick. The two single storey outer sections extend symmetrically from the two storey central section, which also has a raised facade. Inside the central section are the main entrance, lobby, ticket office and waiting room. The outer sections house other services, including a bar.

The station yard has three tracks with platforms for passenger services, and also many other tracks. The passenger building and platform 1 are connected with the other platforms by a pedestrian underpass. To the east, towards Metaponto, there is a small locomotive shed with refueling facilities. In the other direction, towards Battipaglia, there are several small buildings used for various technical purposes, and above them the concrete Musmeci viaduct, which provides road access to the city.

The station has recently been the subject of a redevelopment project under the Centostazioni program. It will shortly also undergo work on its connection with the bus routes in Via Nazario Sauro, through a line of escalators and underground passageways.

== Train services ==
The station has about 950,000 passenger movements each year.

Some of the trains that stop at the station provide long distance links with major cities such as Rome and Naples, and also with the region of Apulia. The more common regional trains link Potenza with closer destinations, including Salerno, Naples, Melfi, Foggia and Taranto.

The station is served by the following service(s):

- Intercity services Rome - Naples - Salerno - Taranto
- Regional services (Treno regionale) Naples - Salerno - Potenza - Metaponto - Taranto
- Regional services (Treno regionale) Foggia - Melfi - Potenza

== See also ==
- Matera Centrale railway station
- History of rail transport in Italy
- Rail transport in Italy
- Railway stations in Italy
- List of railway stations in Basilicata
