= Castelmezzano dialect =

Neapolitan dialect of Potenza, Italy

Castelmezzano
- Native to: Italy
- Region: western Basilicata
- Language family: Indo-European: Italic; Latino-Faliscan; Latin; Romance; Italo-Western; Italo-Dalmatian; Italo-Romance; Neapolitan; Castelmezzano

Language codes
- ISO 639-3: None (mis)
- Glottolog: cast1245

The dialect of Castelmezzano is a Romance variety spoken in Castelmezzano in the Province of Potenza in Italy. It constitutes a dialect of the Neapolitan language that differs from the rest (and from neighbouring imported Gallo-Italic varieties) in its treatment of Latin back vowels, showing an evolution more reminiscent of Eastern Romance: Latin /ŭ/ merges with /ū/ rather than with /ō/.

Castelmezzano is but the kernel of an area, dubbed the Vorposten (German for 'outpost') by Lausberg, which shares the same vowel development. It includes Castronuovo di Sant'Andrea, Sant'Arcangelo, Roccanova, San Martino d'Agri, Aliano (and Alianello), Gallicchio, Missanello, Armento, Pietrapertosa, Anzi, Campomaggiore, Albano di Lucania, Trivigno, Brindisi di Montagna, Corleto Perticara and Guardia Perticara.

This type of vocalism may once have been characteristic of most of southern Italy and possibly even other areas that now have Italo-Western vowel outcomes. It can be viewed as a compromise, in that it has a Sardinian-like treatment of the back vowels, as is also observed in the southern part of the Lausberg area, while also having an Italo-Western-like treatment of the front vowels (merging Latin /ĭ/ with /ē/), as found in other varieties of Neapolitan.

== Comparison of vowel changes ==
Latin	Root form	Vowel	Castelmezzano dialect	Dalmatian	Romanian	Notes
piper	*pipum, *piprum	/ɪ/	pépë	pepro	-	Romanian has got the borrowing "piper".
digitus	digitum	/ɪ/	[?]	detco	deget	
fīlum	-	/iː/	filë	fil	fir	
cor	*corum	/ɔ/	córë	cur	-	Romanian has got the borrowing "cord".
bonus	bonum	/ɔ/	[?]	bun	bun	The vowel was shifted from /o/ to /u/, yielding "bun" in Romanian, as part of vowel reduction.
focus	focum	/ɔ/	[?]	fuc	foc	
somnus	somnum	/ɔ/	[?]	samno	somn	The Dalmatian result may be tied to the consonantal cluster /mn/ or to the retention of the word-final vowel.
sōl	sōlem	/oː/	sólë	saul	soare	The Dalmatian and Romanian terms are only diphthongized due to not having been followed by /u/ or /i/.
vōx	vōcem	/oː/	[?]	baud	boace (archaic)	The Dalmatian and Romanian terms are only diphthongized due to not having been followed by /u/ or /i/. Romanian has got the neologism "voce".
bōs	*bōvum	/oː/	[?]	bu	bou	
tōtus	tōtum	/oː/	[?]	tut, tot	tot	The function as pronoun may be the reason for the Dalmatian alternative form.
furca	furcam	/ʊ/	fùrchë	fuarca	furcă	
surdus	surdum	/ʊ/	[?]	suard	surd	
nux	*nucem, *nucum	/ʊ/	[?]	nauc	nuc	
lūna	lūnam	/uː/	lùnë	loina	lună	
mūrus	mūrum	/uː/	[?]	moir, mor	mur	The Dalmatian variant does not seem to reflect the most usual outcomes.
crūdus	crūdum	/uː/	[?]	croit	crud	

A comparison of vowel changes shows only limited relatability of the languages and the dialect yet Dalmatian sound changes may sometimes differ from the usual phonological development that can be ascertained.
