= Matera Centrale railway station =

Railway station in Matera, Italy

Matera Centrale
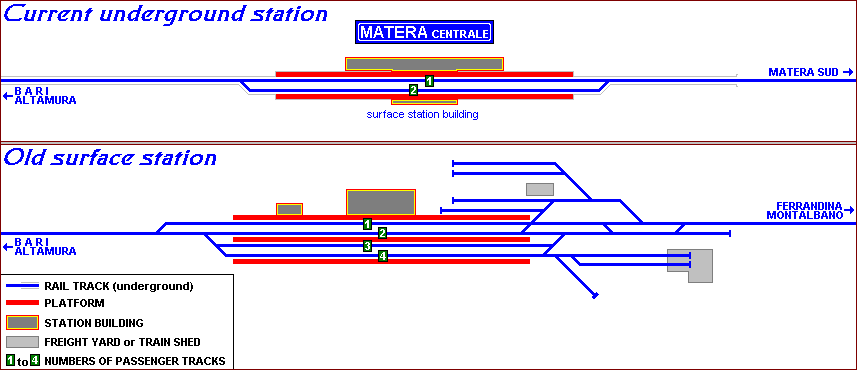
- Schematic map showing the new underground station (above) and the old surface one (below)

General information
- Location: Piazza della Visitazione; 75100 Matera; Matera, Matera, Basilicata; Italy
- Coordinates: 40°39′59.42″N 16°36′4.68″E
- Owner: Ferrovie Appulo Lucane
- Line: Bari-Altamura-Matera
- Platforms: 2 (2 tracks)
- Connections: Urban and suburban buses

History
- Opened: 1 September 1880; 145 years ago
Location
- Location within Basilicata Location within Italy

Matera Centrale is the main railway station in the Italian town of Matera, in Basilicata. It is owned by the Ferrovie Appulo Lucane (FAL), a private company based in Bari, and is the nearest station to the Sassi.

== History ==
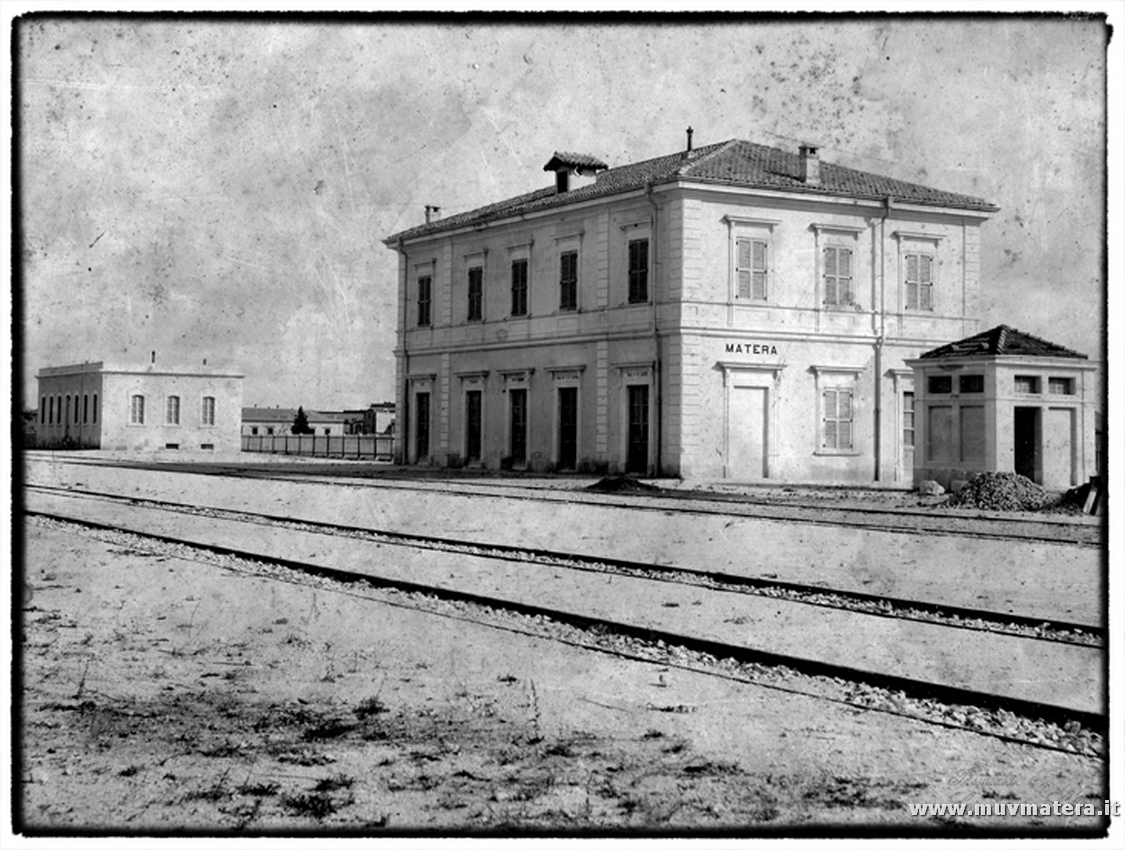
The original station still exists in a different paint scheme. A more modern station is located nearby. The tracks are underground.

The station was opened in 1915, as the southern terminal of the line from Bari and Altamura. In 1928 the Matera-Miglionico stretch was opened, part of the line to Ferrandina and Montalbano Jonico, which operated between 1932 and 1972. Originally a surface station, it was transformed into an underground station.

== Structure ==
The station is located in the town's centre in Piazza della Visitazione along Aldo Moro street, near the town hall. The old two-floor station building (40°40′0.5″N 16°36′5.76″E), preserved, is next to the modern one, located near a car park built over the original sidings. The modern structure is a one-floor square building with a pair of columns at its entrance. It has a pedestrian underpass to the platforms, serving two narrow gauge tracks (950 mm). The line is not electrified.

== Transport ==
It is served, like the other two stations in the city, Matera Sud (the line terminal) and Matera Villa Longo, by several regional trains to Altamura and Bari Centrale. three other minor stops, Matera Campo Sportivo, Matera Serra Rifusa and Matera Rondinelle, are no longer served by passenger traffic.

A project to rebuild the line to Ferrandina, which has a station on the Battipaglia-Potenza-Metaponto line (linking Salerno and Taranto), has been considered by the Ferrovie dello Stato. Works for the line, projected to use the 1,435 mm (4 ft 8 1/2 in) standard gauge, started in 1986 to give Matera a direct rail link to the national network, following in part the former route. Due to lack of funds construction has ceased, with the works incomplete and structures abandoned. Due to the distance to the town's centre (7 km) of the partly built new FS station, which is located in the frazione of La Martella, it has been proposed to use the former route south of the town and to upgrade Matera Centrale, rebuilt as a multi-level underground station or simply enlarged.

== See also ==
- Potenza Centrale railway station
- List of railway stations in Basilicata
- History of rail transport in Italy
- Rail transport in Italy
- Railway stations in Italy
