= Ferrandina–Pomarico–Miglionico railway station =

Railway station in Italy

Ferrandina–Pomarico
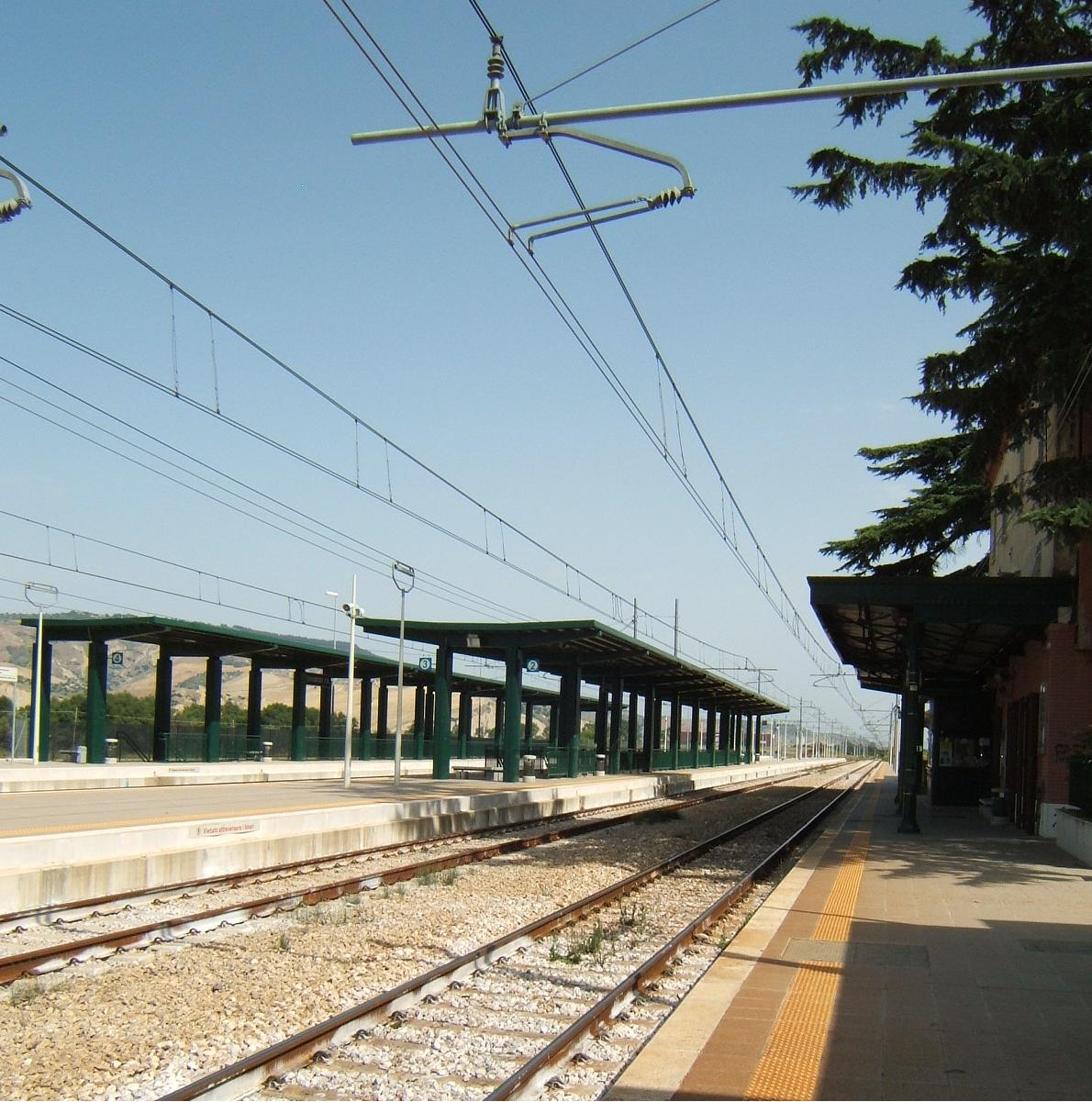
- Ferrandina–Pomarico railway station

General information
- Location: 75013 Ferrandina Scalo; Italy
- Coordinates: 40°30′58″N 16°28′32″E
- Owner: Rete Ferroviaria Italiana
- Operator: Trenitalia
- Line: Battipaglia–Metaponto railway
- Platforms: 4

Other information
- Classification: Silver

Services
Location
- Location within Italy

Ferrandina–Pomarico is a railway station serving Ferrandina and Pomarico, Italy.

== Data ==
The station (usually called Ferrandina station) is located on the Battipaglia–Metaponto railway. The train services are operated by Trenitalia.

The station was modernised in 2005.

The Italian government in August 2017 has decided that the station will be connected to the new station of Matera by a modern railway.

== Train services ==
The station is served by the following service(s):

- Intercity services Rome - Naples - Salerno - Taranto
- Regional services (Treno regionale) Naples - Salerno - Potenza - Metaponto - Taranto

== See also ==
- Battipaglia–Metaponto railway
