= List of presidents of the Province of Matera =

President of the Province of Matera
- Presidente della Provincia di Matera
- Incumbent; Francesco Mancini since 30 September 2024
- Term length: 4 years
- Formation: 1927

The president of the Province of Matera is the head of the provincial government in Matera, Basilicata, Italy. The president oversees the administration of the province, coordinates the activities of the municipalities, and represents the province in regional and national matters.

Since September 2024, the office has been held by Francesco Mancini of the Democratic Party.

== List ==
=== Presidents of the Province (1952–present) ===
No.	Portrait	Name	Term of office		Party
No.	Portrait	Name	Start	End	Party
1		Antonio Bolettieri	14 July 1952	5 February 1953	Christian Democracy
2		Salvatore Peragine	6 February 1953	4 July 1956	Christian Democracy
3		Michele Guanti	5 July 1956	12 December 1960	Italian Communist Party
(2)		Salvatore Peragine	13 December 1960	20 January 1965	Christian Democracy
(2)		Salvatore Peragine	21 January 1965	19 September 1970	Christian Democracy
4		Saverio D'Amelio	19 August 1970	6 May 1976	Christian Democracy
5		Carmine Adduce	7 May 1976	1 October 1976	Italian Socialist Party
(3)		Michele Guanti	2 October 1976	8 August 1980	Italian Communist Party
6		Pietro Barbarito	8 August 1980	17 June 1984	Christian Democracy
7		Umberto Lauria	18 June 1984	2 September 1985	Christian Democracy
8		Francesco Lisanti	2 September 1985	29 May 1990	Christian Democracy
9		Rocco Salvatore Grieco	7 August 1990	24 April 1995	Christian Democracy
10		Angelo Gabriele Tataranno	24 April 1995	14 June 1999	Democratic Party of the Left
11		Giovanni Carelli	14 June 1999	3 April 2004	Italian People's Party
12		Carmine Nigro	14 June 2004	8 June 2009	Union of Democrats for Europe
13		Franco Stella	8 June 2009	13 October 2014	Independent (centre-left)
14		Francesco De Giacomo	13 October 2014	30 October 2018	Democratic Party
15		Piero Marrese	1 November 2018	2 December 2022	Democratic Party
15		Piero Marrese	3 December 2022	6 August 2024	Democratic Party
-		Emanuele Pilato (Acting)	6 August 2024	30 September 2024	Five Star Movement
16		Francesco Mancini	30 September 2024	Incumbent	Democratic Party

== Sources ==
- "Storia amministrativa dell'ente". Ministero dell'Interno.
