= Castelmezzano =

- Comune
- Comune di Castelmezzano
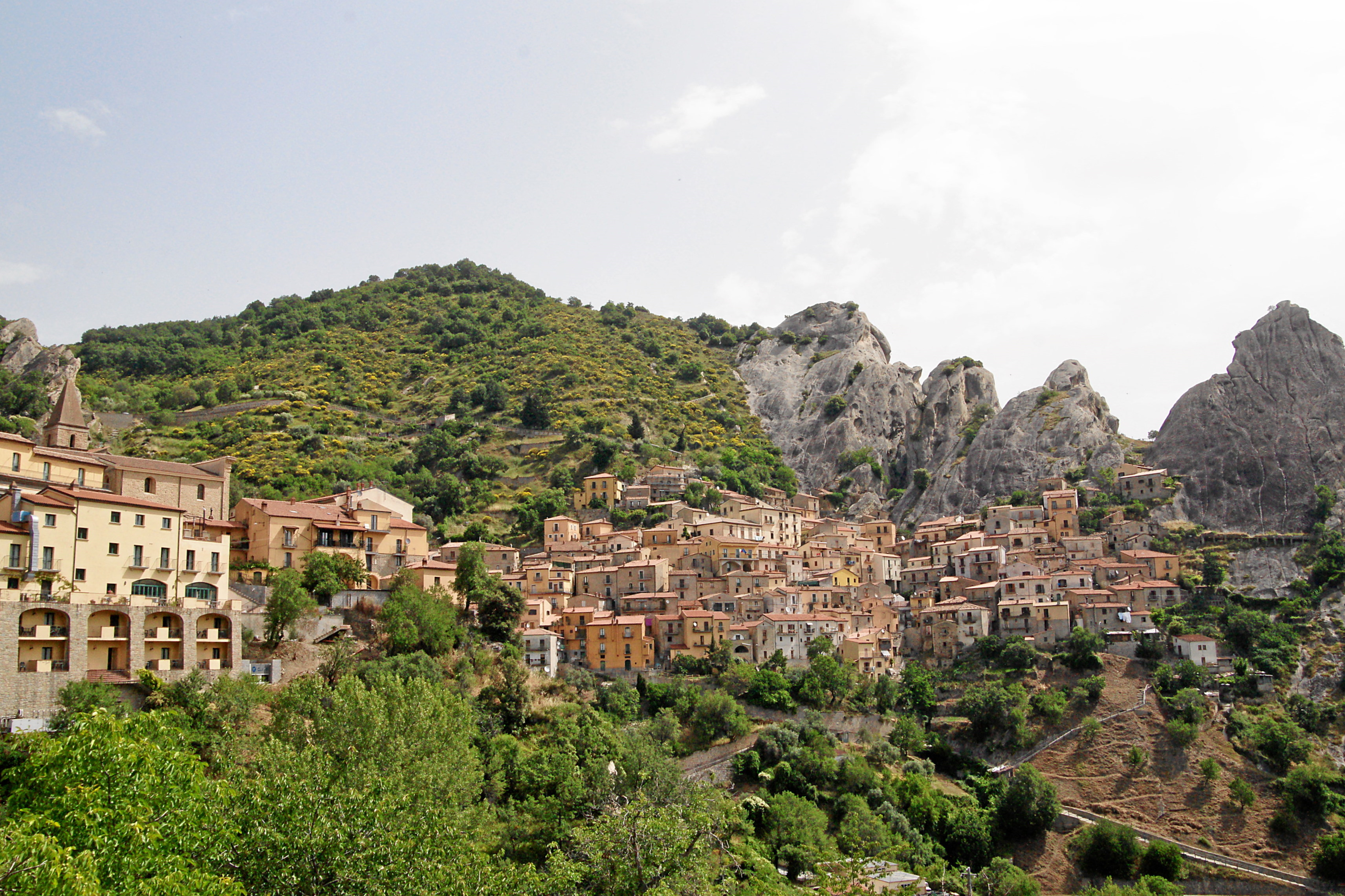
- View of Castelmezzano

- Location within Italy Location within Basilicata
- Coordinates: 40°31′50.13″N 16°2′47.47″E
- Country: Italy
- Region: Basilicata
- Province: Potenza (PZ)

Government
  - Mayor: Nicola Valluzzi

Area
  - Total: 33.91 km^{2} (13.09 sq mi)
- Elevation: 750 m (2,460 ft)

Population (2019-1-1)
  - Total: 771
  - Density: 22.7/km^{2} (58.9/sq mi)
- Time zone: UTC+1 (CET)
  - Summer (DST): UTC+2 (CEST)
- Postal code: 85010
- Dialing code: 0971
- ISTAT code: 076024
- Website: Official website

Castelmezzano (Castelmezzano dialect: Castrëmënzànë) is a town and comune in the province of Potenza, in the Southern Italian region of Basilicata. It is bounded by the comuni of Albano di Lucania, Anzi, Laurenzana, Pietrapertosa, Trivigno.

It is one of I Borghi più belli d'Italia ("The most beautiful villages of Italy"). In 2007 Castelmezzano was chosen by Arthur Frommer's Budget Travel magazine among "The best places you've never heard of". The Telegraph included Castelmezzano among its "Italy's 19 most beautiful villages" list in 2017, defining it "one of southern Italy's most stunningly located villages".

== History ==
The origins of Castelmezzano date to approximately between the 6th and 5th centuries BC, when Greek settlers got into the valley of Basento and founded in Magna Graecia a town called Maudoro, meaning roughly the world of gold. In the 10th century AD, the Saracen invasions forced the local population to find a new location. It is said that during the exodus, a shepherd called Paolino discovered a place to move to, formed by rocks from the steep peaks of which one could repel the invaders by means of rolling stone boulders on to them.

After the occupation by the Lombards, the Normans settled there between the 11th and 13th century AD and built a castle (of which are still visible the remains of the walls and tier of rocks which allowed access to the higher lookout point). It was from the name of the castle (Castrum Medianum, roughly means Castle in the Middle) that the town derived its name, the castle so named because of its position between those of Pietrapertosa and Albano di Lucania. With the Normans, Castelmezzano experienced a period of peace and development, until under the Angevins it experienced a sharp decline.

With the arrival of the Aragonese, between the 14th and 16th century, many landowners received Castelmezzano as fief, although the economic and social conditions remained mostly unchanged. Only with the appointment of Baron Giovanni Antonio De Leonardis (whose family governed the town from 1580 to 1686), did development take place. Subsequently, it passed by marriage to the De Lerma, who held it until 1805, when feudalism was suppressed in southern Italy.

In the 19th century, Castelmezzano was affected by brigandage. Due to its location, rich in natural hiding places among the rocks and lush vegetation, it was an ideal refuge for many bandits. At the end of the century, the town suffered a major migratory exodus, which prompted many families to move overseas.

== Main sights ==
- Mother church of Santa Maria dell'Olmo
- Church of Santo Sepolcro
- Chapel of Madonna dell’Annunziata

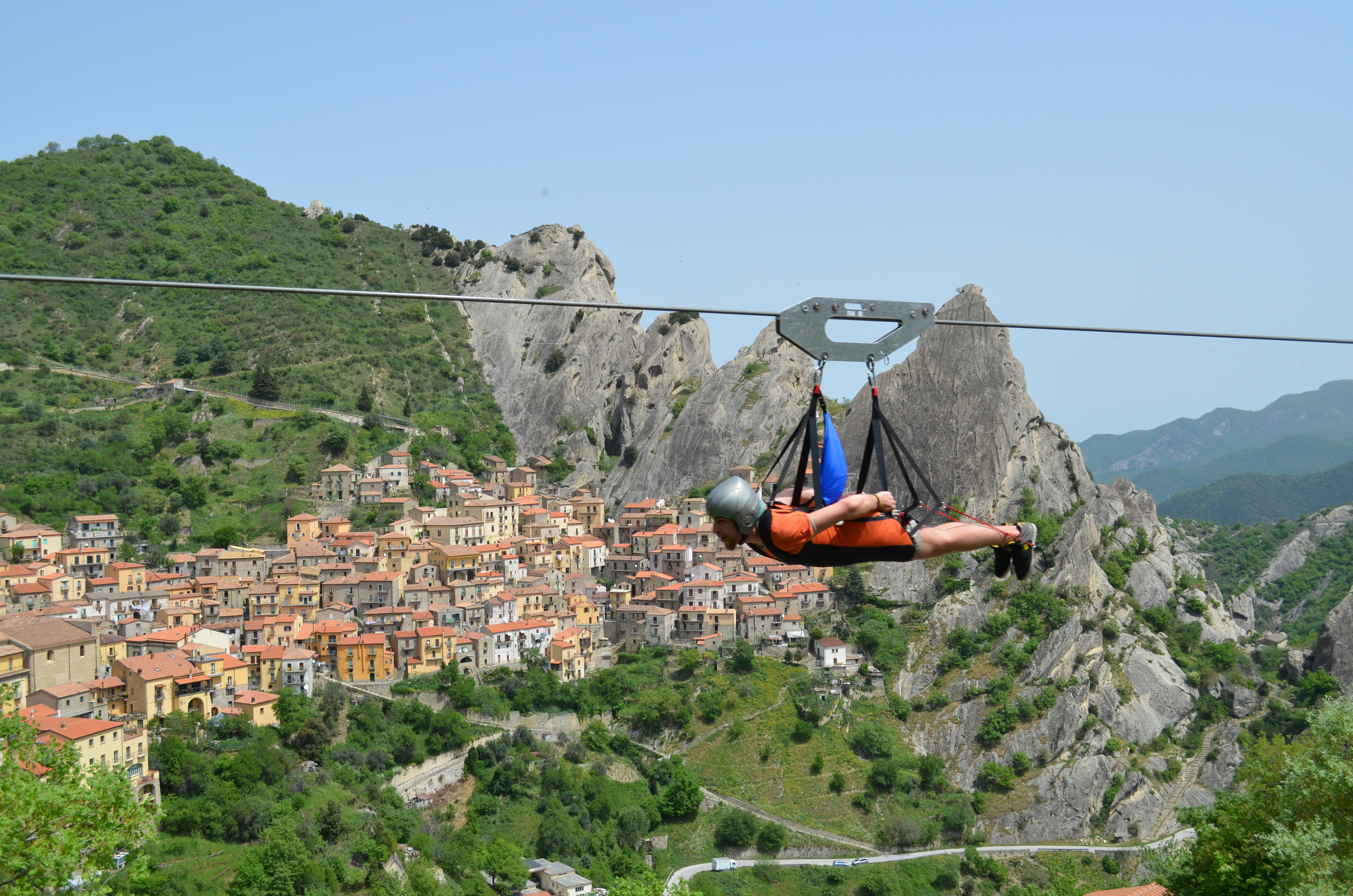
Volo dell'Angelo

== Events ==
The Volo dell'Angelo (Angel Flight) is a high-speed zip line crossing the valley between Castelmezzano and neighbouring Pietrapertosa, offering a panoramic view at over 400 metres (1,300 feet) from the ground at speeds of 120 km/h (70 mph). Inaugurated in 2007, the event is held annually between May and November.

The Percorso delle Sette Pietre (Seven Stones Path) is a literary walk inspired by Mimmo Sammartino’s book Vito ballava con le streghe (Vito danced with the witches), based on ancient stories handed down orally. Each path includes a space that evokes a sequence of the story, with a sound environment that offers additional suggestions to the magic of nature revealed.

== People ==
- Anthony Campagna, Count of Castelmezzano (1884–1969), Italian American real estate developer
- Charles V. Paterno (1876–1946), Italian American real estate developer
- Eugenio Santoro (1920–2006), Italian Swiss sculptor and painter
- Bob Yosco (1874–1942), Italian American musician and Vaudeville performer

== Gallery ==
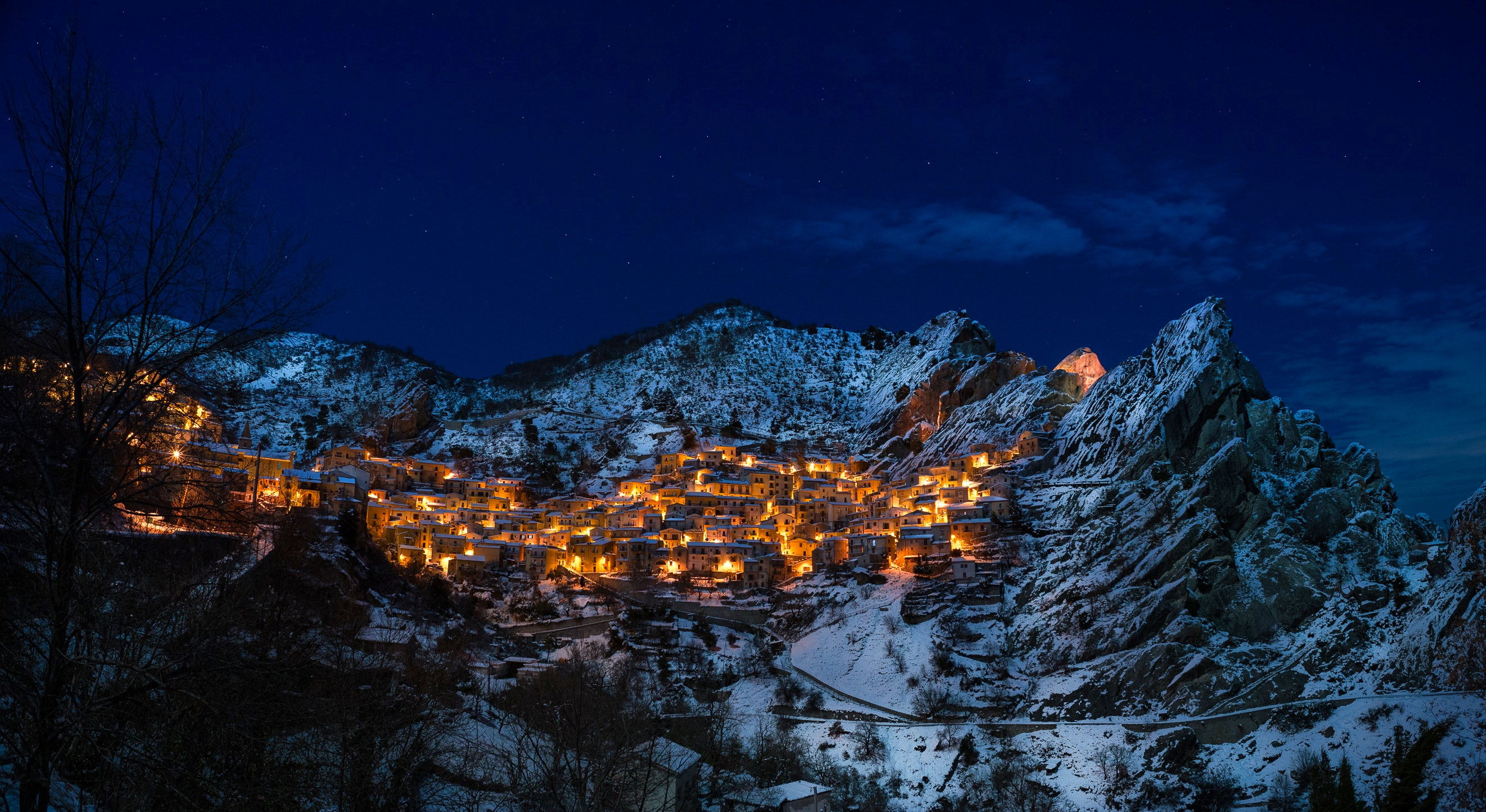
Night view of Castelmezzano after a snowfall

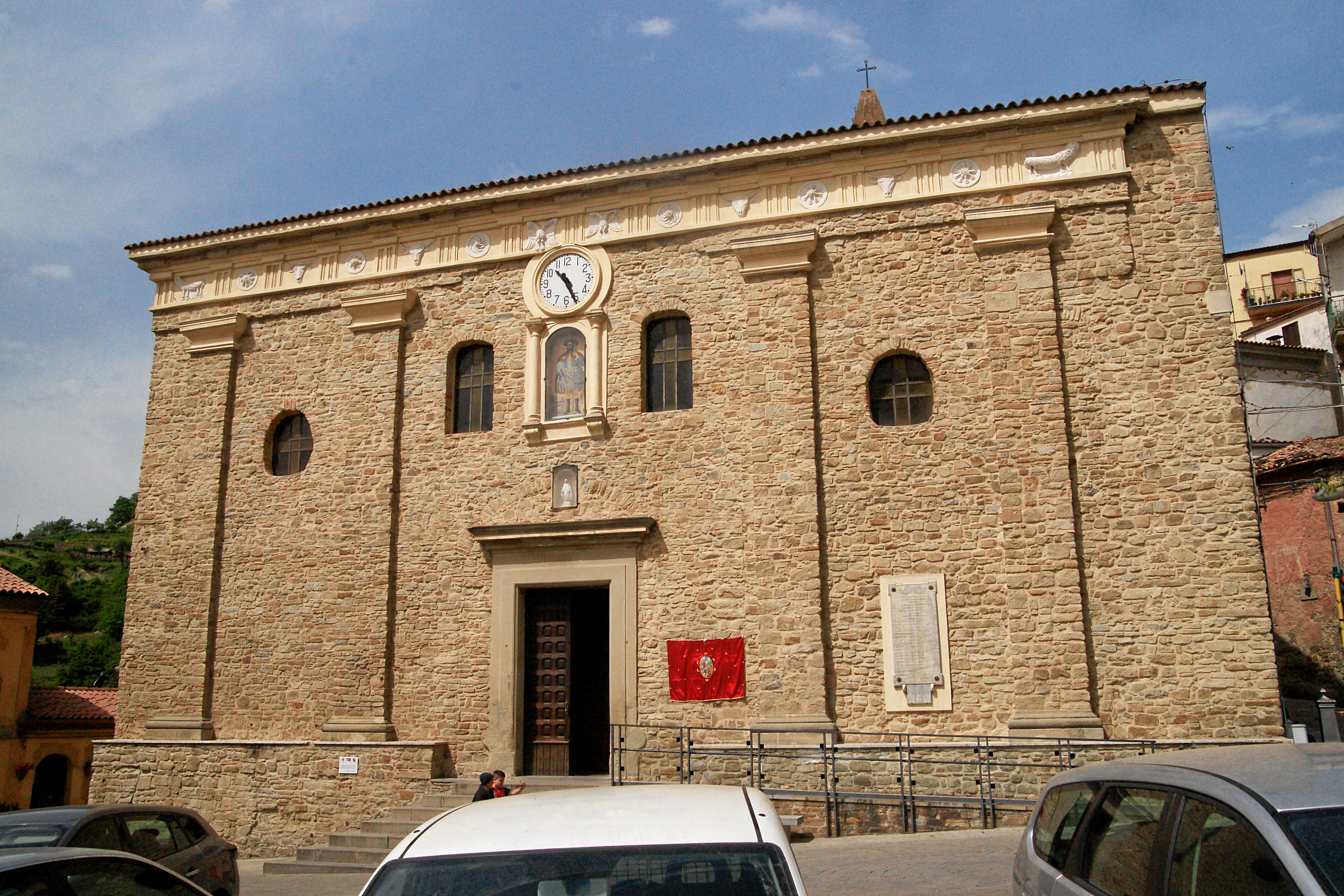
Chiesa Madre di Santa Maria dell'Olmo

== See also ==
- Castelmezzano dialect
- Dolomiti lucane
