= Grassano–Garaguso–Tricarico railway station =

Railway station in Italy

Grassano–Garaguso

General information
- Location: 75010 Scalo Ferroviario Grassano-Garaguso; Italy
- Coordinates: 40°35′35″N 16°14′27″E
- Owner: Rete Ferroviaria Italiana
- Operator: Trenitalia
- Line: Battipaglia–Metaponto railway
- Platforms: 2

Other information
- Classification: Bronze

History
- Opened: 1875; 151 years ago
Location
- Location within Basilicata Location within Italy

Grassano–Garaguso is a railway station between Grassano and Garaguso, Italy. The station is located on the Battipaglia–Metaponto railway. The train services are operated by Trenitalia.

== Train services ==
The station is served by the following service(s):

- Intercity services Rome - Naples - Salerno - Taranto
- Regional services (Treno regionale) Naples - Salerno - Potenza - Metaponto - Taranto
