= Balvano train disaster =

Deadliest railway accident in Italian history, in 1944

Coordinates: 40°40′09″N 15°30′07″E

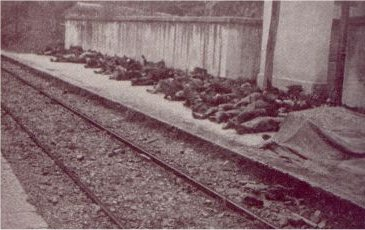
- Some of the corpses gathered in the Balvano railway station

Details
- Date: 3 March 1944; 00:50 - 01:20
- Location: Balvano, Basilicata
- Country: Kingdom of Italy
- Line: Battipaglia–Metaponto railway
- Operator: Ferrovie dello Stato
- Incident type: Carbon monoxide poisoning
- Cause: excessive weight; bad quality coal; lack of natural ventilation in the tunnel

Statistics
- Trains: 1
- Deaths: 517 (official figure by Italian government)
- Injured: 90 poisoned

The Balvano train disaster occurred on the night between 2–3 March 1944 in Balvano, Basilicata, when 517 people in a steam-hauled, coal-burning freight train (mostly stowaways) died of carbon monoxide poisoning during a protracted stall in a tunnel. It was the deadliest railway accident in Italian history and one of the worst railway disasters ever.

== Circumstances ==
In 1943, Axis Italy was invaded by British and American armed forces, and the southern part of the peninsula (almost fully conquered by Allied forces) suffered severe wartime shortages, encouraging an extensive black market. People in large cities such as Naples began bartering fresh produce for commodities brought by servicemen, and stowed away on freight trains to reach their suppliers' farms.

The railway companies also suffered shortages of good-quality coal. The burning of low-grade substitutes in locomotives reduced their power output and produced a large volume of carbon monoxide, an odorless and poisonous gas, a particularly severe problem in Italy's railway network, which crosses mostly mountainous land, and hence makes large use of tunnels with steep inclines of up to 3.5%.

In February 1944, similar conditions resulted in one death on the Battipaglia–Metaponto railway when a man was poisoned by poor-quality coal exhaust. He fainted, was crushed between the engine and the tender, and died. No corrective action was taken to prevent recurrences.

== Disaster ==
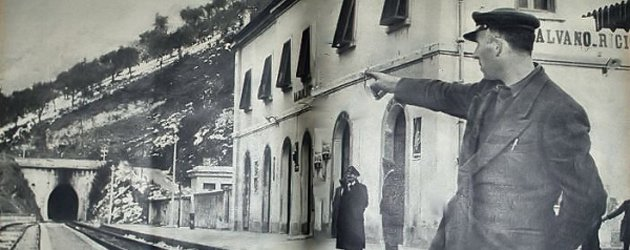
The Balvano station master points out the direction by which the train left. The tunnel shown is not the Armi tunnel, which is 2 kilometres (1.2 mi) further.

On the evening of 2 March 1944 the freight train 8017 started from Naples heading to Potenza. It consisted of 47 freight wagons and had a heavy weight of 520 tonnes (510 long tons; 570 short tons); it also carried many unpaid passengers.

The first part of the journey took place on flat railway, and the train was pulled by an E.626 electric engine. At 19:00 the train left Battipaglia and entered the steeper, non-electrified Battipaglia–Metaponto railway; the electric engine had been replaced by two steam engines (the 480.016 followed by the 476.058).

In Eboli some stowaways were forced off, but more boarded on following stops until they numbered about 600, making the train grossly overloaded. At midnight, the train arrived in the Balvano-Ricigliano station, making it the last before the disaster, where it stopped for maintenance on the engines.

At 00:50 the train restarted towards the adjoining Bella-Muro station, and reached a speed of about 15 kilometres per hour (9.3 mph). After 1.8 kilometres (1.1 mi) of travel, it approached the narrow and poorly ventilated Armi tunnel, which is 1,968 metres (2,152 yd) long with a 1.3% incline. As the engines entered the tunnel, the wheels started to slide on the rails (which were wet due to humidity), despite the use of sand boxes, and the train lost speed until it stopped, with almost all the cars inside the tunnel.

The air was already filled with smoke since another train had passed shortly before, and the drivers' effort to restart the train caused the locomotives to produce even more carbon monoxide–laden smoke. As a result, the crew and stowaways were asphyxiated, so slowly that they failed to realize what was happening to them. Most died in their sleep. Of the few survivors most were in the last few cars, which were still in the open air.

At some point, the driver of the 476 locomotive tried to engage the reverse gear in an attempt to exit the tunnel, but he fainted before succeeding. Moreover, he could not communicate with the driver of the other engine (which in fact continued to push in the forward direction) because the 476 was an Austrian-built engine with right-hand drive, while the 480 had left-hand drive as usual in Italian railways.

At 05:10 the Balvano station master learned of the disaster from last car's brakeman, who had walked back to the station. At 05:25 a locomotive reached the site but the many corpses on the track prevented it from removing the train from the tunnel; only some forty survivors in the last wagons could be assisted. At 08:40 a second rescue team arrived which hauled the train back to the station. Among the crew, only the one brakeman, and the second locomotive's fireman, survived.

Due to the large number of corpses, the wartime lack of resources, and the poverty of many of the victims, only the train staff received a proper burial; stowaways were buried without a religious service in four common graves at the Balvano cemetery.

== Responsibility ==
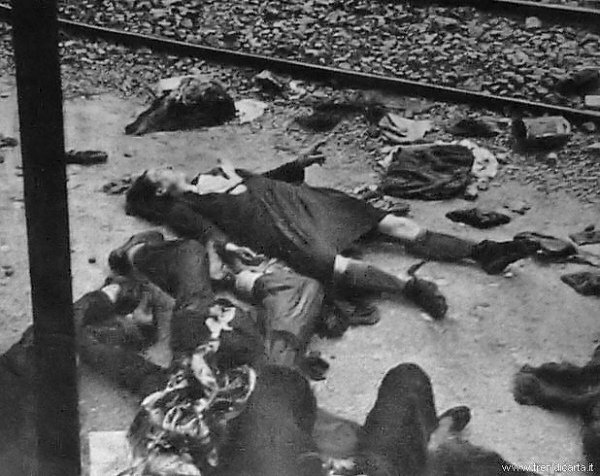
Victims of the disaster

The poisoning was the result of many factors. The root cause was the lack of supervision by railway authorities, who tolerated a large number of stowaways on the train. Contributing factors were the low-quality coal, the lack of ventilation in the tunnel, the wet rails, and the fact that the train was double-headed instead of being banked by the second locomotive. The lack of coordination between the drivers of the two locomotives was the proximate cause. In addition, the death toll was aggravated by the delay in rescue efforts.

Despite this, the commission which inquired into the accident did not pursue those responsible, and considered it as caused by force majeure. At the time, the catastrophe was attributed mainly to:

"A combination of material causes, such as dense fog, atmospheric haze, complete lack of wind, which did not keep the natural ventilation of the tunnel, wet rails, etc., causes that unfortunately occurred all at once and in rapid succession. The train stopped because it slid on the rails and the staff of the machines had been overwhelmed by the produced gas, before they could act to move the train out of the tunnel. Due to the presence of carbon monoxide, extraordinarily poisonous, it produced the asphyxiation of stowaways. The action of this gas is so rapid, that the tragedy occurred before any aid could be brought from the outside."

The station masters of Balvano and Bella-Muro were blamed because they did not act to determine the location of the train when it appeared late on the roadmap. However, in the wartime confusion it was usual for communications to be irregular, and trains could be greatly delayed. It was not uncommon that it would take over two hours to travel the mountainous 7 kilometres (4.3 mi) between the two stations.

The staff of the train and of the stations along the route were also blamed, because they allowed such a heavy train to continue even if they knew that its engines were not powerful enough. However the provisions for the train came straight from the Allied Command, so railway workers could not stop the train and change its composition. The Command itself organized a train to check the condition of the disaster, with staff equipped with oxygen masks, which recognized the actual development of abnormal amounts of toxic gases.

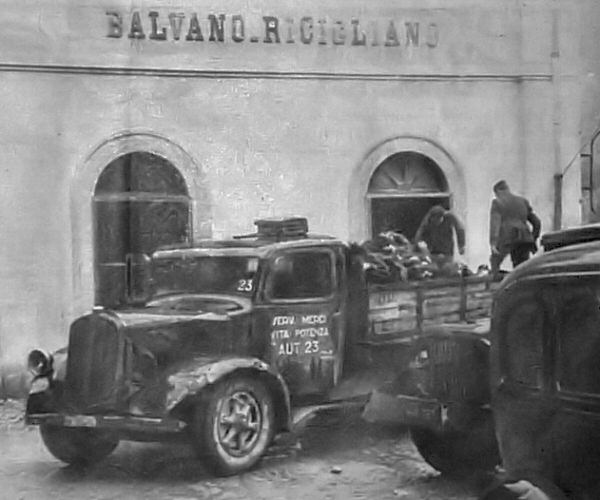
Transportation of the victims to the common grave

Ferrovie dello Stato Italiane denied all responsibility, claiming that in the complex end-of-war set-up (where Italian authorities coexisted with the US command) they could not even immediately determine who had the responsibility for the management of one particular train. However the company could be blamed because at that time, despite the high demand on the route between Naples and Potenza, there was only one scheduled passenger train (train 8021), which left from Naples twice a week, on Wednesdays and Saturdays, which prompted an increase in illegal ridership on freight trains.

In attempt to prevent criticism, the Ministry of Treasury issued to the families of all identified victims the same compensation which was given for war victims (although it was paid more than 15 years afterwards).

== Regulation changes ==
After the disaster, a limit of 350 tonnes (340 long tons; 390 short tons) was introduced on the entire line. In addition, for particularly heavy trains requiring two locomotives, a composition of an American diesel locomotive and an Italian steam locomotive was used in place of a double steam drive. Furthermore, at the south exit of the Armi tunnel a permanent guard post was established, which allowed trains to enter the gallery only when exhaust gases from previous trains had cleared.

The guard post remained in place until 1959, when all steam trains were banned from the line. The weight regulations were repealed in 1994, when the line was electrified.

== In popular culture ==
- "Galleria dele Armi" - song by American artist Terry Allen from the album Human Remains (1996).
- "The Black Market Express" - episode about the Balvano train disaster from the documentary Disasters of the Century (2000), aired on Canadian network History.

== See also ==
- Lists of rail accidents
