= Francesco Mancini (politician) =

Italian politician (born 1972)

President of the Province of Matera
- Incumbent
- Assumed office 30 September 2024
- Preceded by: Piero Marrese

Mayor of Pomarico
- Incumbent
- Assumed office 26 May 2014
- Preceded by: Giuseppe Casolaro

Personal details
- Born: 1 July 1972 (age 54) Pomarico, Basilicata, Italy
- Party: Democratic Party

Francesco Mancini (born 1 July 1972) is an Italian politician of the Democratic Party serving as president of the Province of Matera since 2024. He also served as mayor of Pomarico since 2014.

== Career ==
Mancini was first elected mayor of Pomarico in the 2014 local elections, obtaining 1,017 votes (39.04%) as the candidate of a centre-left civic list. He was subsequently re-elected in 2019 and in 2024.

In the 2024 Basilicata regional election, Mancini was a candidate for the Regional Council of Basilicata in the Democratic Party list. He received 3,682 preference votes but was not elected.

In September 2024, Mancini was elected president of the Province of Matera, supported by the centre-left coalition. He obtained 53,337 weighted votes, compared with 38,293 for Giuseppe Arturo De Filippo, mayor of Calciano and candidate supported by the centre-right.
