= FS Class 480 =

Italian steam locomotive

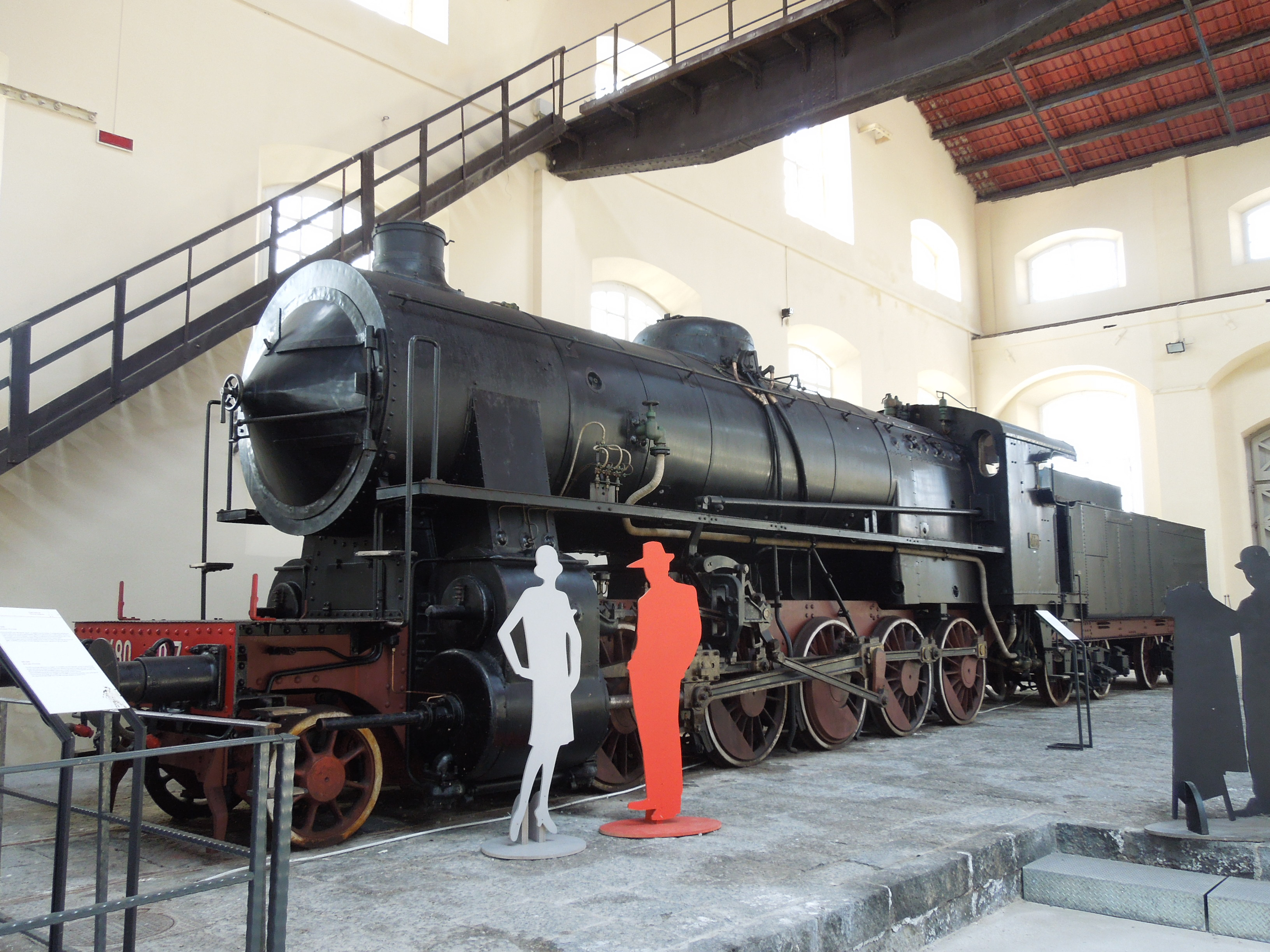
- FS locomotive 480.017 as preserved
Type and origin
- Power type: Steam
- Builder: Officine Meccaniche
- Build date: 1923
- Total produced: 18
Specifications
- Configuration
  - UIC: 1′E h2
- Gauge: 1,435 mm (4 ft 8 1/2 in)
- Leading dia.: 860 mm (33.86 in)
- Driver dia.: 1,370 mm (53.94 in)
- Length: 12,175 mm (39 ft 11.3 in)
- Axle load: 15 tonnes (15 long tons; 17 short tons)
- Loco weight: 84.3 tonnes (83.0 long tons; 92.9 short tons)
- Tender weight: 49.6 tonnes (48.8 long tons; 54.7 short tons)
- Fuel type: Coal
- Fuel capacity: 6,000 kg (13,000 lb)
- Water cap.: 22,000 L (4,800 imp gal; 5,800 US gal)
- Firebox
  - Grate area: 4.3 m^{2} (46 sq ft)
- Boiler pressure: 12 kg/cm^{2} (1.18 MPa; 171 psi)
- Heating surface: 217.3 m^{2} (2,339 sq ft)
- Superheater
  - Heating area: 60 m^{2} (650 sq ft)
- Cylinders: Two, outside
- Cylinder size: 670 mm × 650 mm (26.38 in × 25.59 in)
- Valve gear: Walschaerts
Performance figures
- Maximum speed: 60 km/h (37 mph)
- Power output: 1,500 PS (1,100 kW; 1,480 hp)
- Tractive effort: 21,000 kgf (206 kN; 46,300 lbf)

The Ferrovie dello Stato (FS; Italian State Railways) Class 480 (Italian: Gruppo 480) is a 2-10-0 steam locomotive.

== Design and construction ==
The Class 480 was expressly designed for the Brenner Railway, after the First World War had resulted in Italy and the FS taking possession of it up to its summit at the Brenner Pass. Previously the Austrian company Südbahn had worked the line with its powerful 2-10-0 SB 580 locomotives, ten of which had remained south of the new border and had been taken over by the FS as Class 482; these were however insufficient, and the Italian Class 470 locomotive, while powerful, did not have enough steaming to adequately last for the 90 km (56 mi) section from Bolzano to the summit. Therefore, it was decided to design a new locomotive based on the Class 482.

The Class 480 was fitted with an Italian bogie, the central driving wheels had their flanges reduced, and the last driving axle was given some lateral play to allow the locomotive to deal with sharp curves; because of the need of a boiler with good steaming capacity, a huge firebox (4.3 m^{2} (46 sq ft), considered the maximum compatible with hand-firing) was fitted. Coherent with the standard FS practices, the locomotives were superheated and had two simple-expansion cylinders; they also had left-hand drive and multiple Del Papa valves. A standard FS bogie tender was fitted.

Given the needs of the Brenner line, only 18 locomotives were ordered, all to the Officine Meccaniche, which delivered them in 1923.

== Operations ==
The Class 480 was initially allocated on the Brenner line, on which it proved very successful. After it was electrified in 1930 the locomotives were transferred to the sheds of Messina and Catania; in the last years of World War II they were re-transferred to Salerno, but returned to Sicily in the postwar years until the end of their career, although some of them were assigned to heavy shunting duties. The last Class 480 locomotives were withdrawn from duty in the early 1970s.

== Accidents ==
The locomotive 480.016 was one of the two steam locomotives involved in the Balvano train disaster, the deadliest train disaster of Italy and one of the deadliest to this date. In the night between 2 and 3 March 1944, a freight train illegally ridden by hundreds of people stalled in a tunnel on the line between Naples and Potenza, near the railway station of Balvano; the crews and the passengers were overcome by fumes and killed by carbon monoxide poisoning, with more than 500 victims. The causes were indicated as the poor adherence conditions because of the humid rails, and the poor quality of the coal supplied by the Allied authorities of occupation.

== Preservation ==
One Class 480 locomotive survived into preservation, the 480.017, which is kept as a static exhibit at the Pietrarsa railway museum.
