= Antonio Bolettieri =

Italian politician, lawyer and writer (1915–2003)

Member of the Senate of the Republic
- In office 12 June 1958 – 4 June 1968
- In office 11 November 1970 – 24 May 1972

President of the Province of Matera
- In office 14 July 1952 – 5 February 1953
- Succeeded by: Salvatore Peragine

Personal details
- Born: 18 April 1915 Grassano, Province of Potenza, Kingdom of Italy
- Died: 30 March 2003 (aged 87) Rome, Italy
- Party: Christian Democracy
- Education: University of Naples Federico II
- Occupation: Lawyer

Antonio Bolettieri (18 April 1915 – 30 March 2003) was an Italian politician, lawyer and writer. A member of Christian Democracy, he served as a senator of the Italian Republic from 1958 to 1968 and again from 1970 to 1972. He was also president of the Province of Matera in the early 1950s.

== Selected works ==
- Guardo alla vita: per i giovani della nuova Italia (1938)
- Riprendere il cammino della distensione (1967)
- La felicità assente: per una ecologia della vita (1995)
- Solitudine itinerante (1996)
- Ricordi dal parlamento. Anche nel Senato passi perduti (1999)
- Villa triste. Da Coccau a Grassano. Viaggio di Silvia Lucano attraverso l'Italia occupata dai nazifascisti. Novembre 1943-aprile 1944 (2001)
