= Cancellara =

Cancellara Comune di Cancellara
- Comune
- Municipality of Cancellara
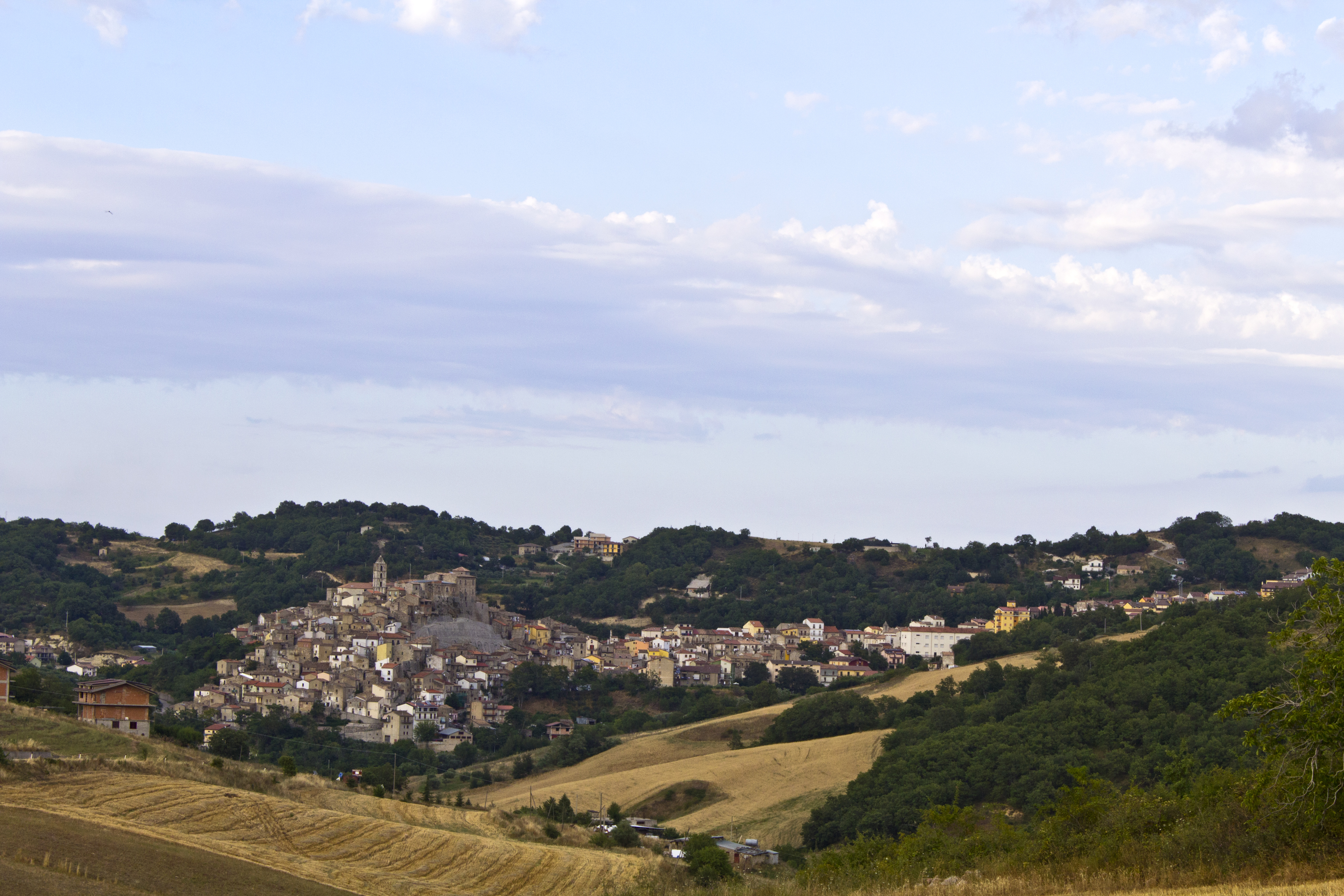
- View of Cancellara

- Location within Italy Location within Basilicata
- Coordinates: 40°44′N 15°55′E
- Country: Italy
- Region: Basilicata
- Province: Potenza (PZ)

Government
  - Mayor: Antonio Lo Re

Area
  - Total: 42.12 km^{2} (16.26 sq mi)
- Elevation: 680 m (2,230 ft)

Population (4-30-2023)
  - Total: 1,126
  - Density: 26.73/km^{2} (69.24/sq mi)
- Demonym: Cancellaresi
- Time zone: UTC+1 (CET)
  - Summer (DST): UTC+2 (CEST)
- Postal code: 85010
- Dialing code: 0971
- ISTAT code: 076018
- Patron saint: St. Blaise
- Saint day: 3 February
- Website: Official website

Cancellara (Lucano: Cangeddàre) is a town and comune in the province of Potenza, in the Southern Italian region of Basilicata. It is bounded by the comuni of Acerenza, Avigliano, Oppido Lucano, Pietragalla, Tolve, Vaglio Basilicata.

== History ==
A legendary account of the town's origin describes a Roman leader named Pietro Cancellario who, after the defeat of Hannibal in the 3rd century BC, retreated to the area and built a village, naming it Cancellara.

Some claim that the founder of Cancellara was the 13th century man Petruccio Cancellario, lord and founder also of Pietragalla, whose tomb is inside the chapel of St. Catherine of Alexandria in Cancellara. Others would derive the etymology of the name from the Latin "Ager cancellatus," meaning entrenched camp for prisoners of war, or from "Canculi," meaning traps used by hunters to catch wild animals.

The origin of the village dates back to around the 10th-7th centuries BC. Excavations carried out in the nearby hill "Serra del Carpine" unearthed the remains of a necropolis from the 6th century B.C., which is a source of interest for the many archaeology enthusiasts. During that period Cancellara probably underwent Greek influence, coming from the Ionian coast through Serra di Vaglio; the grave goods unearthed are mostly indigenous with achromatic or sub-geometric pottery.

After the year 1,000 the medieval castle was built. Between 1647 and 1648, like other Lucanian municipalities, it was involved in the popular uprisings against Spanish fiscalism organized by Neapolitan bourgeoisie figures who used Masaniello (Tommaso Aniello; 1620-1647) to gain the support of the Neapolitan plebs. In 1694 a major earthquake seriously damaged the castle.

The Friars Minor of the Convent of the Annunziata, during the 18th century, contributed to the growth of Cancellara, and the urban expansion and construction of the many stately mansions dates from this period.

The 18th century was the century of greatest demographic and urban expansion, and of extraordinary cultural growth sparked by the Franciscans. In 1799 it adhered to the ideals of the Parthenopean Republic; and in the nineteenth century it was the site of activities related to the pre-Risorgimento Carbonaria. Earthquakes in 1857 and 1980 caused significant damage.

Also during the 18th century, the community was visited by many travelers who sought the air and cuisine. The most famous food from the town is salami, which is celebrated annually on Feb. 3 with the "Sagra del salame," on the celebration of St. Blaise.
