= Bella–Muro railway station =

Railway station near Bella, Italy

Bella–Muro
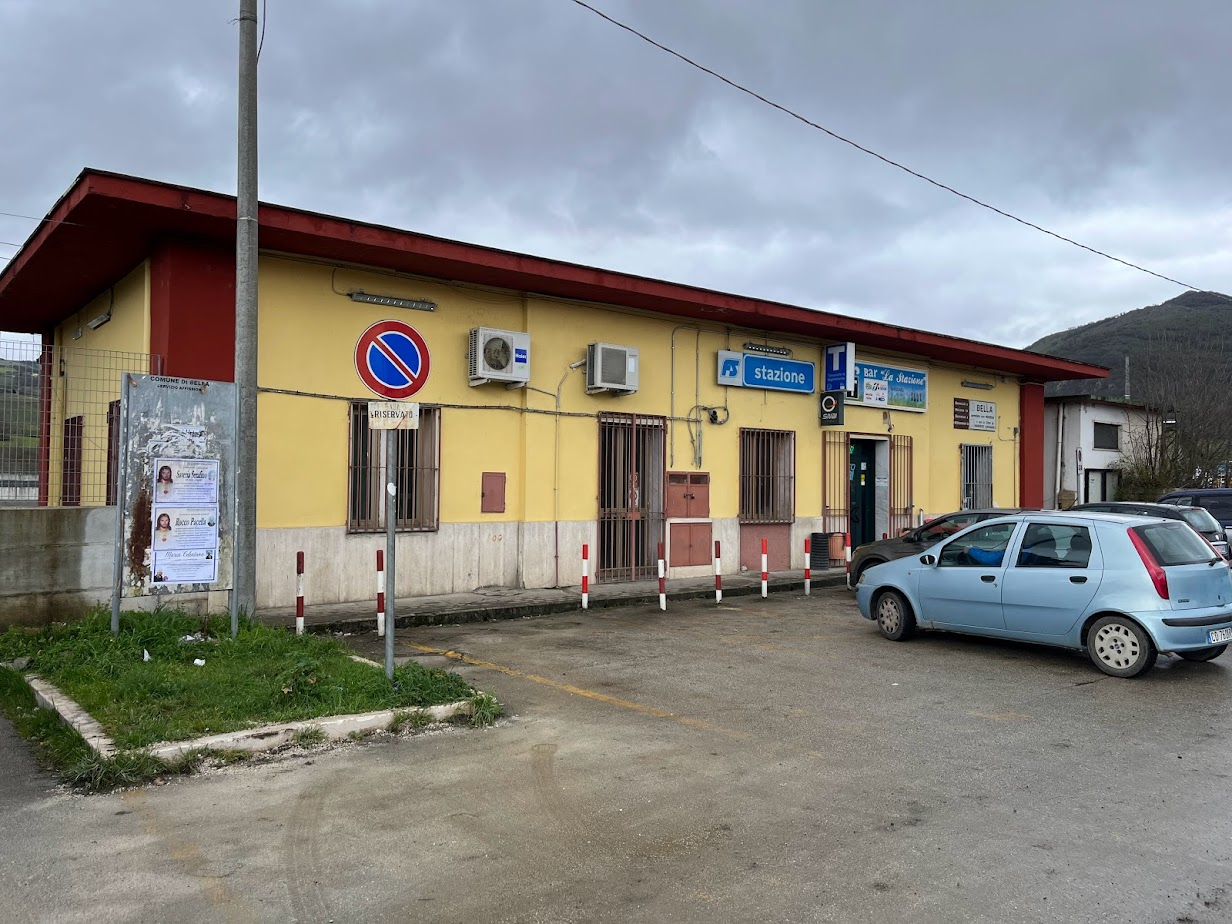
- Bella–Muro railway station

General information
- Location: Bella, Province of Potenza, Basilicata; Italy
- Coordinates: 40°42′03″N 15°32′34″E
- Owner: Rete Ferroviaria Italiana
- Operator: Trenitalia
- Line: Battipaglia–Metaponto railway

History
- Opened: 6 November 1877; 148 years ago
Location
- Location within Basilicata Location within Italy

Bella–Muro is a railway station near Bella, Italy. The station opened on 6 November 1877 and is located on the Battipaglia–Metaponto railway. The train services are operated by Trenitalia.

== Train services ==
The station is served by the following service(s):

- Intercity services Rome - Naples - Salerno - Taranto
- Regional services (Treno regionale) Naples - Salerno - Potenza - Metaponto - Taranto
