= Brindisi Montagna =

- Comune
- Comune di Brindisi Montagna
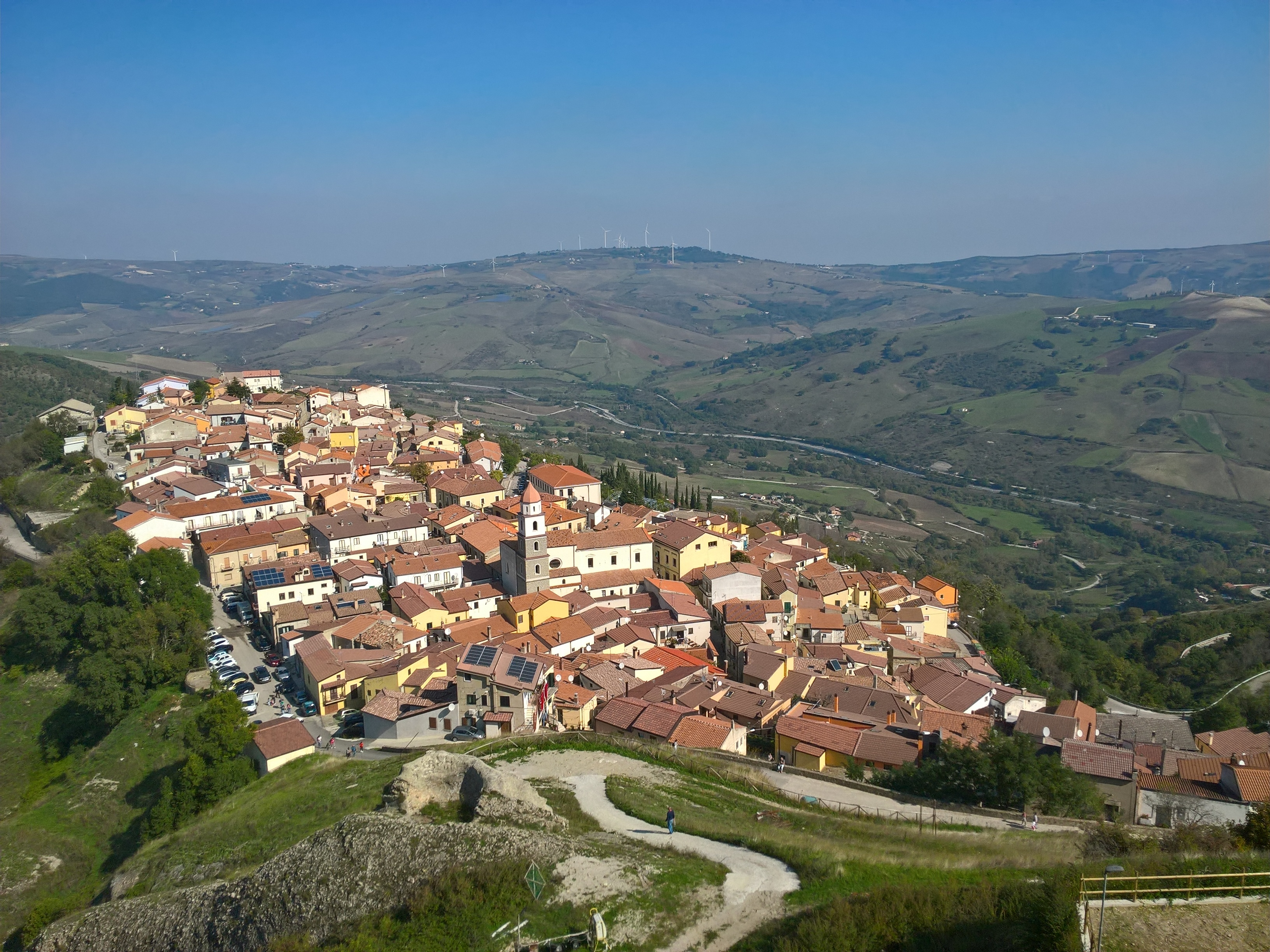
- View of Brindisi Montagna

- Coat of arms

- Brindisi Montagna within the Province of Potenza

- Location within Italy Location within Basilicata
- Coordinates: 40°37′N 15°56′E
- Country: Italy
- Region: Basilicata
- Province: Potenza (PZ)

Government
  - Mayor: Gerardo Larocca

Area
  - Total: 59.88 km^{2} (23.12 sq mi)
- Elevation: 800 m (2,600 ft)

Population (31 December 2009)
  - Total: 917
  - Density: 15.3/km^{2} (39.7/sq mi)
- Demonym: Brindisini
- Time zone: UTC+1 (CET)
  - Summer (DST): UTC+2 (CEST)
- Postal code: 85010
- Dialing code: 0971
- ISTAT code: 076014
- Website: Official website

Brindisi Montagna, also spelled Brindisi di Montagna (Lucano: Brìnnese) is an Arbëreshë town and comune in the province of Potenza, in the Southern Italian region of Basilicata.

== Geography ==
The municipality borders with Albano di Lucania, Anzi, Potenza, Tricarico (MT), Trivigno and Vaglio Basilicata.
