= Pietragalla =

- Comune
- Comune di Pietragalla
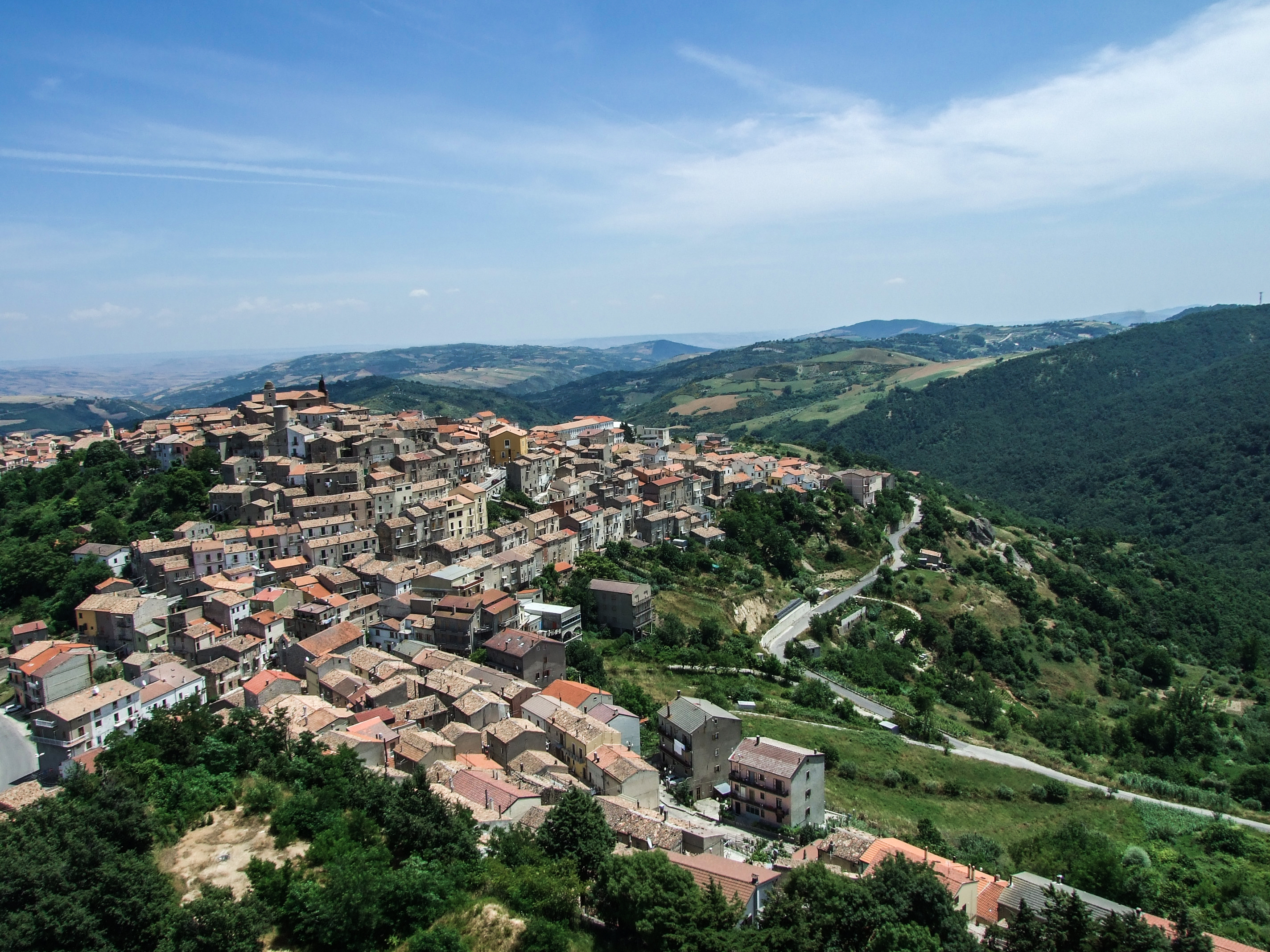
- View of Pietragalla

- Location within Italy Location within Basilicata
- Coordinates: 40°45′N 15°53′E
- Country: Italy
- Region: Basilicata
- Province: Potenza (PZ)

Area
  - Total: 65 km^{2} (25 sq mi)
- Elevation: 839 m (2,753 ft)

Population (2018-01-01)
  - Total: 4,342
  - Density: 67/km^{2} (170/sq mi)
- Demonym: Pietragallesi
- Time zone: UTC+1 (CET)
  - Summer (DST): UTC+2 (CEST)
- Postal code: 85016
- Dialing code: 0971
- ISTAT code: 076060
- Patron saint: St. Theodosius
- Saint day: May 10

Pietragalla is a town and comune in the province of Potenza, in the Southern Italian region of Basilicata. It is bordered by the comuni of Acerenza, Avigliano, Cancellara, Forenza, Potenza, Vaglio Basilicata.

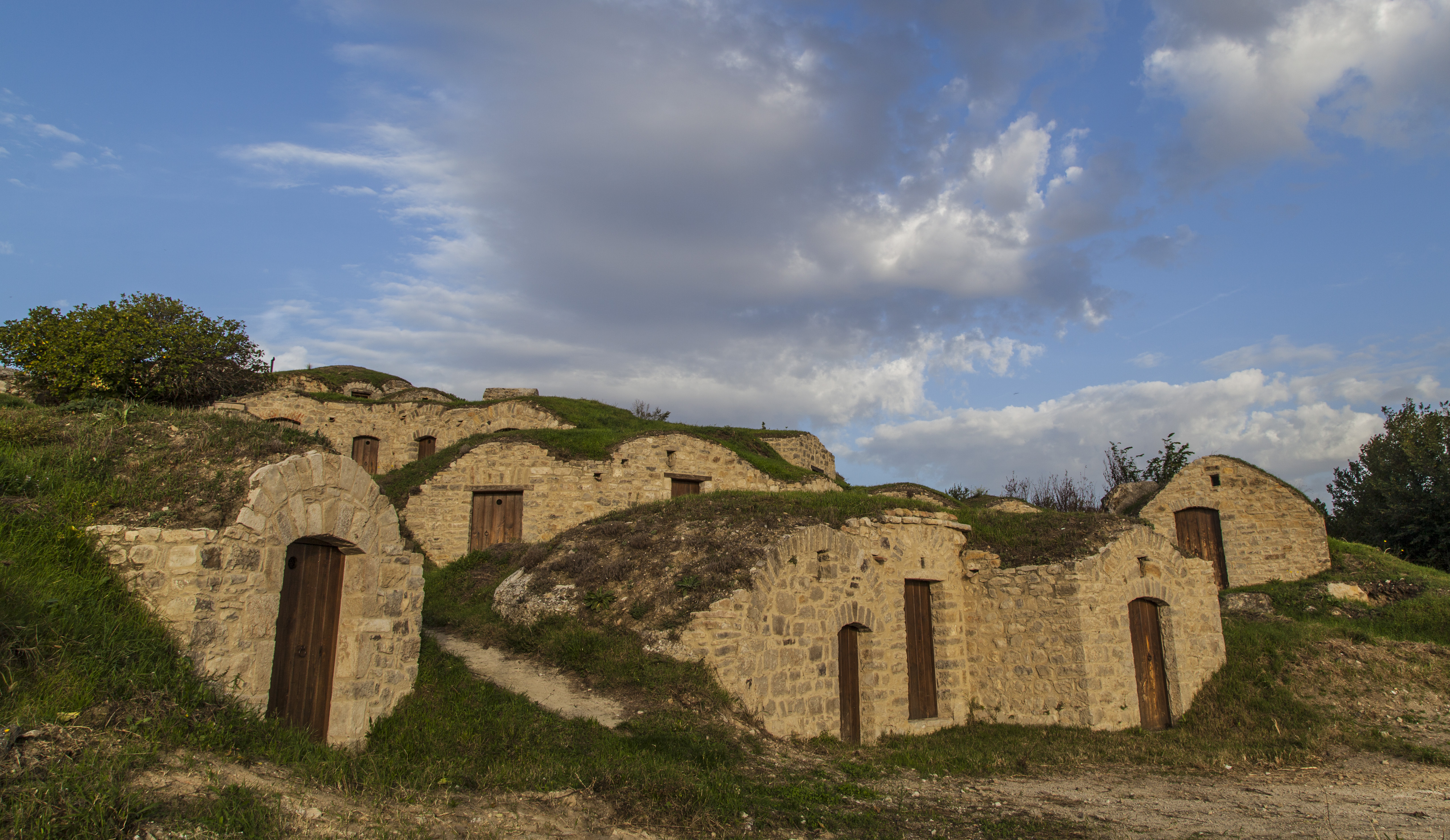
Palmenti di Pietragalla
