= Metaponto railway station =

Railway station in Metaponto, Italy

Metaponto

General information
- Location: 75012 Metaponto; Italy
- Coordinates: 40°22′05″N 16°48′57″E
- Owner: Rete Ferroviaria Italiana
- Operator: Trenitalia
- Lines: Taranto–Reggio di Calabria railway Battipaglia–Metaponto railway
- Platforms: 7

Other information
- Classification: Silver

History
- Opened: 1869; 157 years ago
Location
- Location within Basilicata Location within Italy

Metaponto is a railway station in Metaponto, Italy. The station is located on the Taranto–Reggio di Calabria railway and Battipaglia–Metaponto railway. The train services are operated by Trenitalia.

== Train services ==
The station is served by the following service(s):

- Intercity services Rome - Naples - Salerno - Taranto
- Intercity services Reggio di Calabria - Siderno - Crotone - Rossano - Taranto
- Regional services (Treno regionale) Naples - Salerno - Potenza - Metaponto - Taranto
- Regional services (Treno regionale) Sibari - Monte Giordano - Metaponto
