= Michele Guanti =

Italian politician (1915–2013)

President of the Province of Matera
- In office 5 July 1956 – 12 December 1960
- Preceded by: Salvatore Peragine
- Succeeded by: Salvatore Peragine
- In office 2 October 1976 – 8 August 1980
- Preceded by: Carmine Adduce
- Succeeded by: Pietro Barbarito

Member of the Senate of the Republic
- In office 16 May 1963 – 24 May 1972

Personal details
- Born: 1 November 1915 Matera, Kingdom of Italy
- Died: 29 March 2013 (aged 97) Matera, Italy
- Party: Italian Communist Party

Michele Guanti (1 November 1915 – 29 March 2013) was an Italian politician of the Italian Communist Party. He served as president of the Province of Matera from 1956 to 1960 and again from 1976 to 1980, and as a member of the Senate from 1963 to 1972.
