= Balvano =

- Comune
- Comune di Balvano
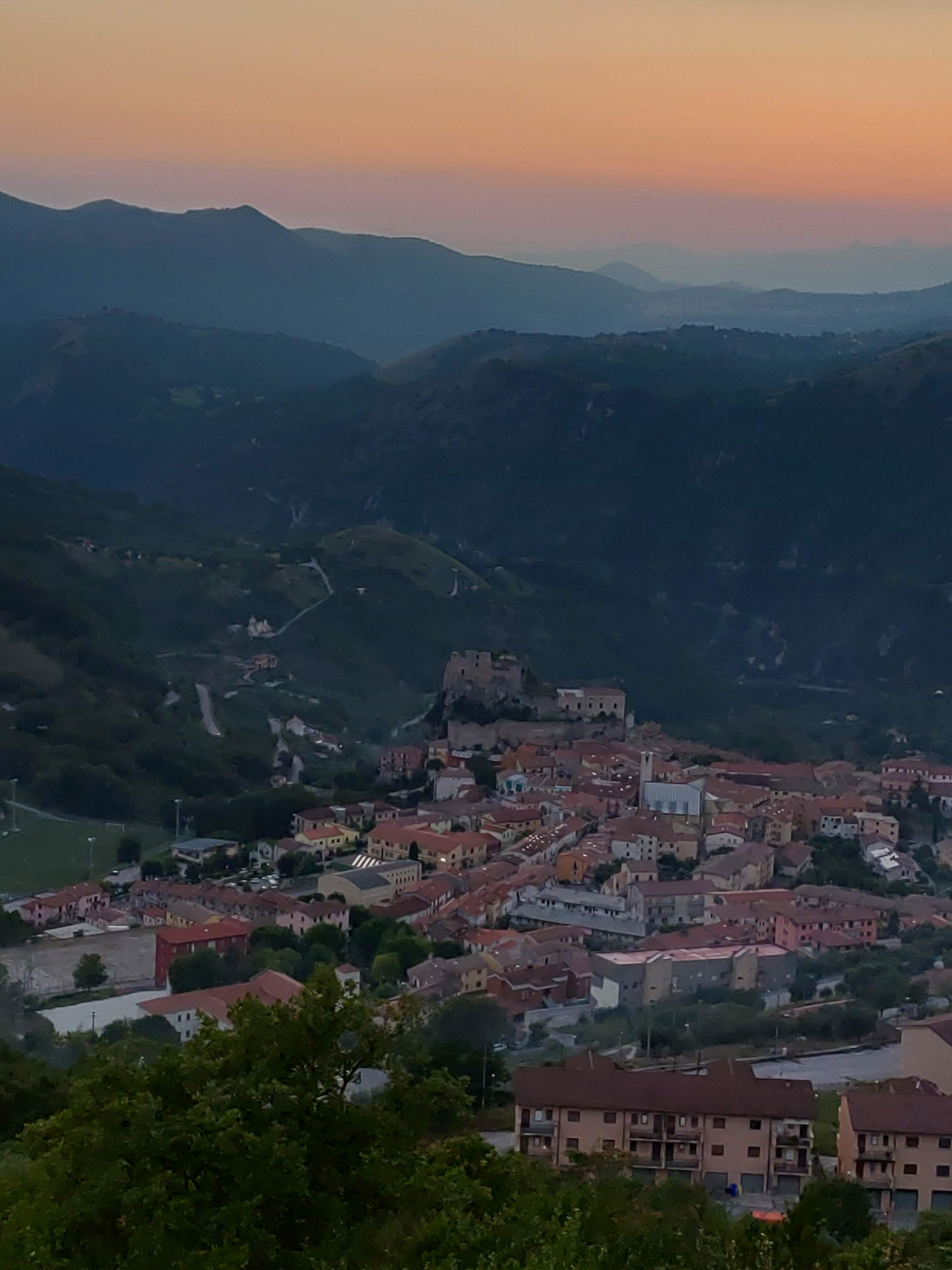

- Location within Italy Location within Basilicata
- Coordinates: 40°39′N 15°31′E
- Country: Italy
- Region: Basilicata
- Province: Potenza (PZ)

Government
  - Mayor: Costantino Di Carlo

Area
  - Total: 41 km^{2} (16 sq mi)
- Elevation: 425 m (1,394 ft)

Population (31 December 2006)
  - Total: 1,938
  - Density: 47/km^{2} (120/sq mi)
- Demonym: Balvanesi
- Time zone: UTC+1 (CET)
  - Summer (DST): UTC+2 (CEST)
- Postal code: 85050
- Dialing code: 0971
- ISTAT code: 076008
- Patron saint: St. Anthony
- Saint day: 13 June
- Website: Official website

Balvano (Lucano: Balvàne) is a city and commune in the province of Potenza (Basilicata, southern Italy).

The recent history of Balvano is connected to several catastrophes. In 1944, a steam train stalled in a nearby railway tunnel, suffocating over 500 people. It was also one of the towns nearly destroyed by the 1980 Irpinia earthquake.
