= Pomarico =

Pomarico Pomerikon (Greek)
- Comune
- Comune di Pomarico
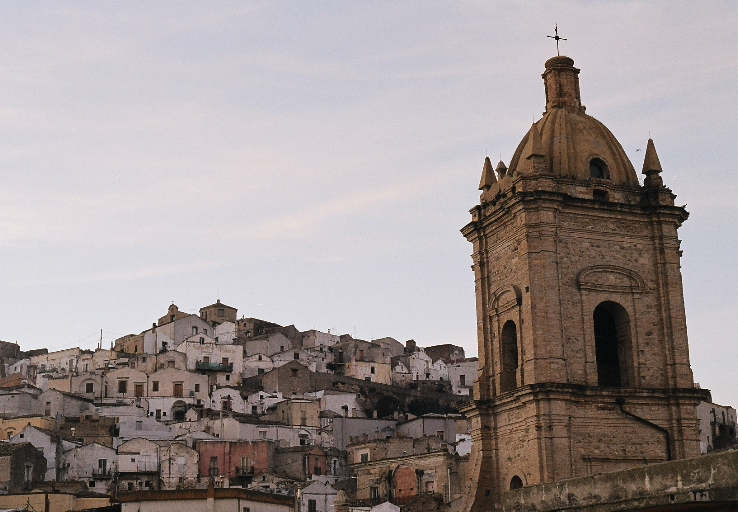
- View of Pomarico

- Location within Italy Location within Basilicata
- Coordinates: 40°31′N 16°33′E
- Country: Italy
- Region: Basilicata
- Province: Province of Matera (MT)

Government
  - Mayor: Francesco Mancini

Area
  - Total: 129.67 km^{2} (50.07 sq mi)
- Elevation: 459 m (1,506 ft)

Population (2018-01-01)
  - Total: 4,451
  - Density: 34.33/km^{2} (88.90/sq mi)
- Demonym: Pomaricani
- Time zone: UTC+1 (CET)
  - Summer (DST): UTC+2 (CEST)
- Postal code: 75016
- Dialing code: 0835
- ISTAT code: 077022
- Patron saint: St. Michael Archangel
- Saint day: 8 May
- Website: Official website

Pomarico (Greek: Pomerikon) is a small town of 4500 inhabitants in Southern Italy, in the region Basilicata. It is about 30 kilometres (19 mi) from Matera, the capital of the province to which Pomarico belongs.

The town was founded about 850 AD by the Byzantines. An old castle was built but only few ruins of it remain.

== Main sights ==
- The Marquess Palace, built in the 18th century, and still standing in the centre of the town.
- The Main Church dedicated to St. Michael, also built in that period. It has a Baroque façade and contains a wooden statue of St. Michael (1400), as well as paintings of Pietro Antonio Ferro and Andrea Vaccaro.
- The church of St. Anthony of Padua (18th century). It lies by a former convent, now used as the city hall.

== People ==
- Niccolò Fiorentino (lawyer and patriot during the Neapolitan Revolution)
