= Battipaglia–Metaponto railway =

Railway line in Italy

Overview
- Status: in use
- Owner: RFI
- Line number: 124
- Locale: Italy
- Termini: Battipaglia railway station; Metaponto railway station

Service
- Type: Heavy rail
- Operator: Trenitalia

History
- Opened: In stages between 1863 and 1880

Technical
- Line length: 198 km (123 mi)
- Number of tracks: Single track
- Track gauge: 1,435 mm (4 ft 8 1/2 in) standard gauge
- Electrification: Electrified at 3000 V DC

The Battipaglia–Metaponto railway is an Italian railway line 198-kilometre (123-mile) long that connects Rome, Naples and Battipaglia with Potenza, Metaponto and Taranto. It is a commonly used trans-apennine linkage.

== History ==
The line was opened in stages between 1863 and 1880.

| Date | Section |
|---|---|
| 14 June 1863 | Battipaglia - Eboli |
| 1 December 1874 | Eboli- Contursi |
| 15 June 1875 | Metaponto - Pisticci |
| 30 September 1875 | Contursi–Romagnano |
| 15 November 1875 | Pisticci–Ferrandina |
| 10 April 1876 | Ferrandina–Grassano |
| 3 June 1877 | Romagnano–Balvano |
| 1 August 1877 | Grassano–Calciano |
| 6 November 1877 | Balvano–Baragiano |
| 15 January 1880 | Baragiano–Picerno |
| 1 September 1880 | Picerno–Potenza |
| 27 December 1880 | Potenza–Calciano |

In 1944 the deadliest accident in Italian railway history, the 8017 convoy Battipaglia-Potenza, happened on this line with over 500 victims.

== Upgrades ==
Between 1986 and 1993 the railway was closed to allow for major works to upgrade the line, during which it was electrified. Electric trains however did not start using the line until 31 March 1994. In 1995 a service was launched using Eurostar ETR 450.

== Usage ==
The line is used by the following service(s):

- Intercity services Rome - Naples - Salerno - Potenza - Taranto
- Regional services (Treno regionale) Naples - Salerno - Potenza - Metaponto - Taranto

== See also ==
- List of railway lines in Italy
