= Grassano =

- Comune
- Comune di Grassano
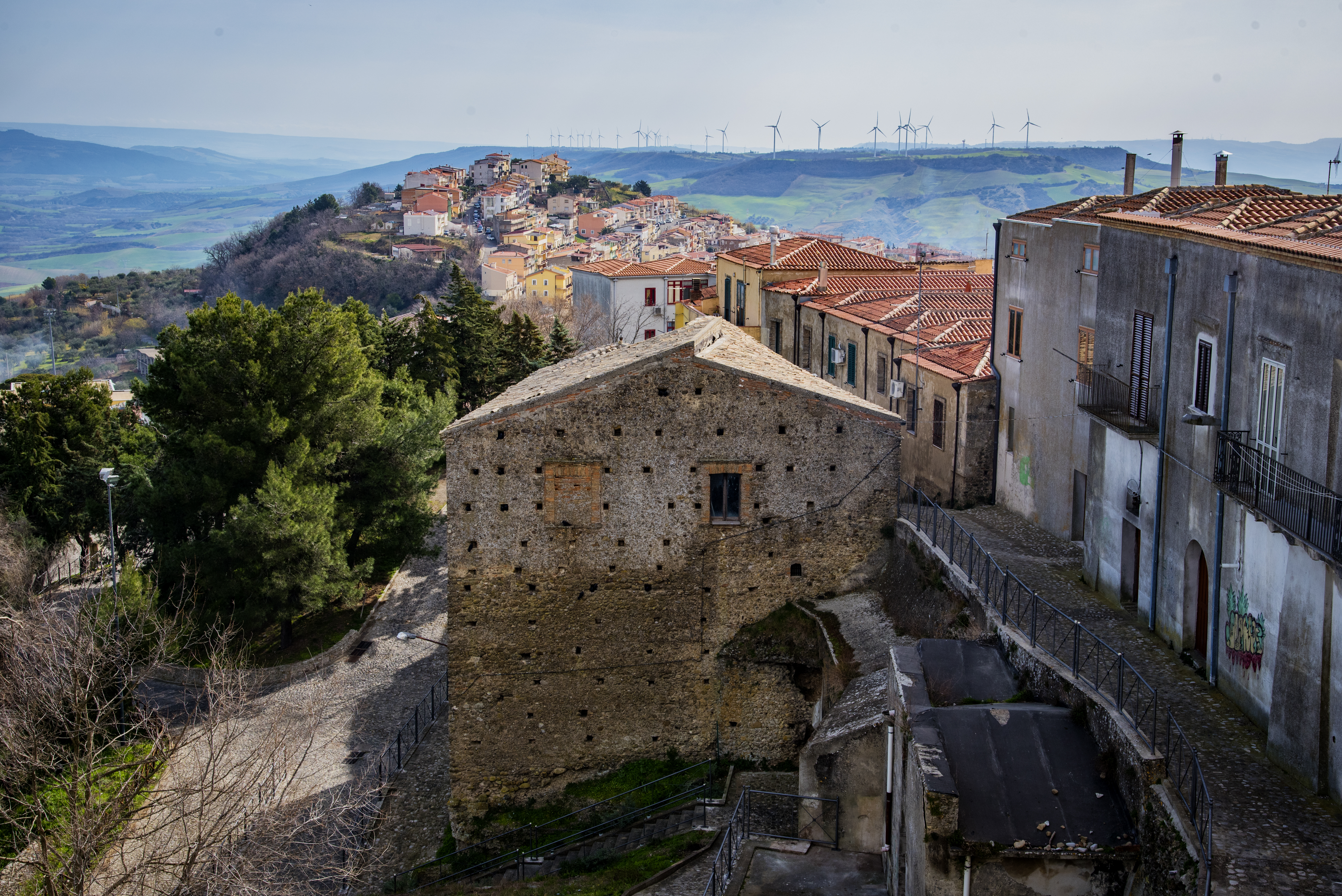
- View of Grassano

- Coat of arms

- Location of Grassano in Italy Grassano (Basilicata)
- Coordinates: 40°38′N 16°17′E
- Country: Italy
- Region: Basilicata
- Province: Matera

Government
  - Mayor: Filippo Luberto

Area
  - Total: 41.63 km^{2} (16.07 sq mi)
- Elevation: 576 m (1,890 ft)

Population (2015)
  - Total: 5,228
  - Density: 125.6/km^{2} (325.3/sq mi)
- Demonym: Grassanesi
- Time zone: UTC+1 (CET)
  - Summer (DST): UTC+2 (CEST)
- Postal code: 75014
- Dialing code: 0835
- ISTAT code: 077011
- Patron saint: Saint Innocent
- Saint day: September 22
- Website: Official website

Grassano is a town and comune in the province of Matera, in the southern Italian region of Basilicata. It is located between the Bradano and Basento rivers at an elevation ranging from about 150 to 576 metres (492 to 1,890 ft) above sea level. The town proper is 43 kilometres (27 mi) from Matera and 59 kilometres (37 mi) from the regional capital, Potenza.

== History ==
Grassano was founded around 1000 AD. The first official document including the town's name is dated 1123, where it is reported as castellum quod vocatur Crassanum ("castle which is called Crassanum"). In the 15th century, Grassano was officially a rural seat of the Tricarico's Diocese. Grassano's people later asked King Ladislaus of Naples for an independence act, and Grassano has remained an independent village since January 19, 1414.

Carlo Levi was arrested and exiled to Grassano because of his anti-fascist activities. In Grassano, Levi painted about 70 pictures and started discovering southern Italy's problems. He described his experiences in Grassano in his most famous book, Christ Stopped at Eboli, which was published after the Second World War in 1945.

Anna Briganti, the grandmother of former New York Mayor Bill de Blasio, originated in Grassano. By 1905 she was married and well-established in New York.

Since 2002, Grassano, with Aliano (the second place where Levi was exiled) is an active Literary Park.
