= Ferrandina =

Ferrandina Troilia (Greek)
- Comune
- Comune di Ferrandina
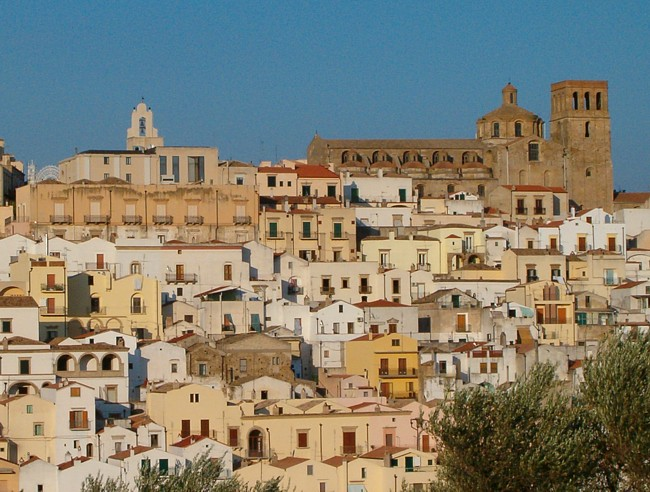
- View of Ferrandina

- Location within Italy Location within Basilicata
- Coordinates: 40°30′N 16°27′E
- Country: Italy
- Region: Basilicata
- Province: Matera (MT)
- Frazioni: Macchia di Ferrandina

Government
  - Mayor: Carmine Lisanti

Area
  - Total: 218.11 km^{2} (84.21 sq mi)
- Elevation: 420 m (1,380 ft)

Population (May 2009)
  - Total: 9,117
  - Density: 41.80/km^{2} (108.3/sq mi)
- Demonym: Ferrandinesi
- Time zone: UTC+1 (CET)
  - Summer (DST): UTC+2 (CEST)
- Postal code: 75013
- Dialing code: 0835
- ISTAT code: 077008
- Patron saint: San Rocco
- Saint day: 16 August
- Website: Official website

Ferrandina (Lucano: Frannine) is a town and comune in the province of Matera, in the Southern Italian region of Basilicata. It is a center for production of high quality olive oil.

== Geography data ==
The town is located on a 482 metres (1,581 ft) hill in the Basento Valley on the western bank of the river Basento. Ferrandina is part of the "Collina Materana" and it is the fourth biggest town in Basilicata. Towns close are: Pomarico, Miglionico, Salandra, Pisticci, Grottole, San Mauro Forte and Craco. Ferrandina is 35 kilometres (22 mi) from Matera and 77 kilometres (48 mi) from Potenza.

== Climate ==
The typical Materan hill climate is very hot during the summer and cold and fresh during the winter. Rain fall is concentrated principally from October to May and snow in winter. Also heavy fog in the autumn-winter season.

== History ==
The towns roots go back as far as Magna Grecia, about 1000 BC. The original name was Troilia, while its acropolis was called Obelanon (Uggiano). Troilia was built in memory of the Asia Minor city Troia by the Ancient Greeks. Ferrandina was named in honor of the father of King Frederick of Naples. In 1507 Ferdinand II of Aragon conferred it the title of 'Civitas'. Right after, the Dominicans created an agricultural center specialized in the production of wool, highly valued in the Kingdom of Naples.

In 1546 the Dominicans established the monastery of Saint Dominic. Ferrandina took part of the 1820 and 1860 rebellions. In March 1862, brigand leader Carmine Crocco confronted and destroyed here a company of Italian troops.

In September 1943, Ferrandina rose against the fascists. The farmers rebelled to expel and seize the land of fascist landlords. The town was cut off from electricity and telephones in an attempt to quench the protest. The provisional government sent to the city military troops, later followed by minister Mario Scelba, member of the provisional anti-fascist government of Southern Italy, arrived in Ferrandina.

In 2003 Ferrandina took part in protest against the decision to build a nuclear waste center despite no evidence that it would negatively effect the community.

== Main sights ==
- Mother Church of St Mary of the Cross, built in 1490 and transformed at the end of the 18th century. The church comprises three 16th-century doors and three Byzantine domes. The church houses a statue of the Virgin with the Child and two statues of Ferdinand of Aragon and his wife Isabella del Balzo, executed by Altobello Persio.
- Our Lady of Mount Carmel church, located in the Purgatorio neighborhood, with a 16th-century door and arch. It was built by the Dominicans when they arrived from Uggiano. After an earthquake, the Dominicans abandoned the church and built the church of St Dominic.
- Capuchin Convent, which houses works of art attributed to Pietro Antonio Ferro, such as a "Virgin and Child" and "Saints Peter and Francis".
- St. Clare Monastery, built in 1688 with a tower that dominates the inner town. The monastery houses a Crucifixion by Pietro Antonio Ferro and a painting of the Immaculate Conception by Francesco Solimena.
- Saint Dominic Monastery, built in 1517, restored and completed in Baroque style in 1760. It houses numerous paintings by Neapolitan school and a 17th-century organ, a wooden choir and a marble altar.
- Saint Francis Convent, founded in 1614, including a church with two aisles.
- Madonna dei Mali Chapel, a countryside church with frescos by Pietro Antonio Ferro (17th century).
