= Metaponto =

Metaponto Metapóntion (Greek)
- Frazione
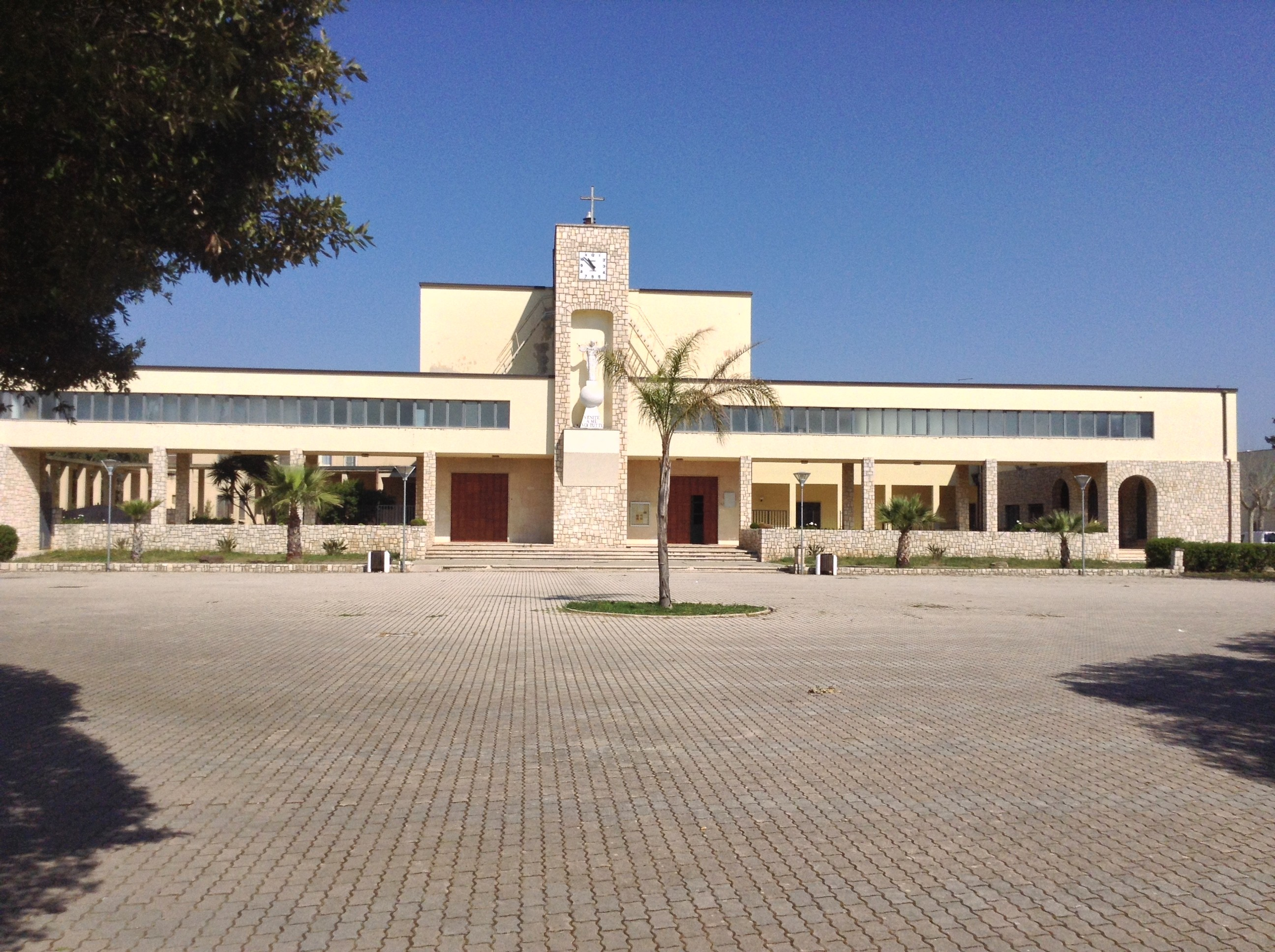
- Chiesa San Leone Magno

- Location of Metaponto in Italy
- Coordinates: 40°22′28″N 16°48′36″E
- Country: Italy
- Region: Basilicata
- Province: Matera
- Comune: Bernalda
- Elevation: 4 m (13 ft)

Population (2010)
  - Total: 1,028
- Demonym: metapontini
- Time zone: UTC+1 (CET)
  - Summer (DST): UTC+2 (CEST)
- Postal code: 75010
- Dialing code: 0835

Metaponto is a small town of about 1,000 people in the province of Matera, Basilicata, Italy. Administratively it is a frazione of Bernalda.

== History ==
The town was built by the ancient Greeks to defend Sybaris from the growth of Taranto. A 1 km stretch of beach with white powdery sand is a further tourist attraction. The city of Metaponto was built by Greek settlers of Achaia in the second half of the 7th century to defend themselves from the continuous expansion of Taranto.

One of its strengths was the fertility of its territory, witnessed by the barley ear depicted in the coins and, therefore, also a symbol of the city.

Metapontus allied himself with Sibari and Crotone, participated in the destruction of Siris, and aided Athens in the expedition to Sicily.

In 280 BC, during the Battle of Heraclea, he allied with Pyrrhus and Tarantus against Rome. The war was won by Rome and, therefore, Metapontus was punished. Pisticci helped many people by giving them refuge, remaining, during the battle, the only city loyal to Metaponto.

In 207 BC, Metapontus offered hospitality to Hannibal, but the Romans punished her by destroying her, but in the first century before Christ returned to its maximum splendor, continuing its expansion until the Roman age.

Today, in Metaponto the Palatine Tables and the National Archaeological Museum can be visited.

== Geography ==
Metaponto is located by the Ionian Coast on the road linking Potenza and Matera with Taranto. It is composed by the main village and Metaponto Lido, the beach area. Between them there are located the ruins of Metapontum and the railway station.

== Gallery ==
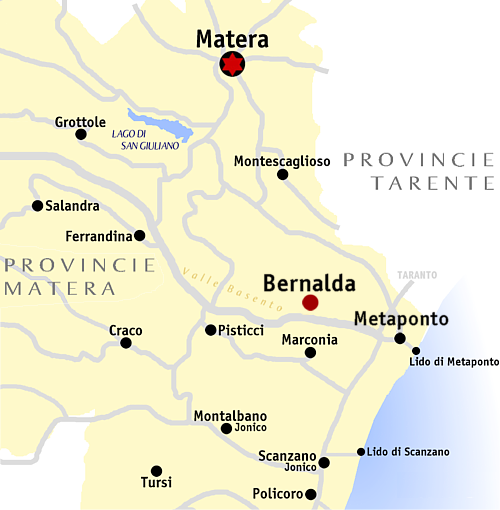
Location Map

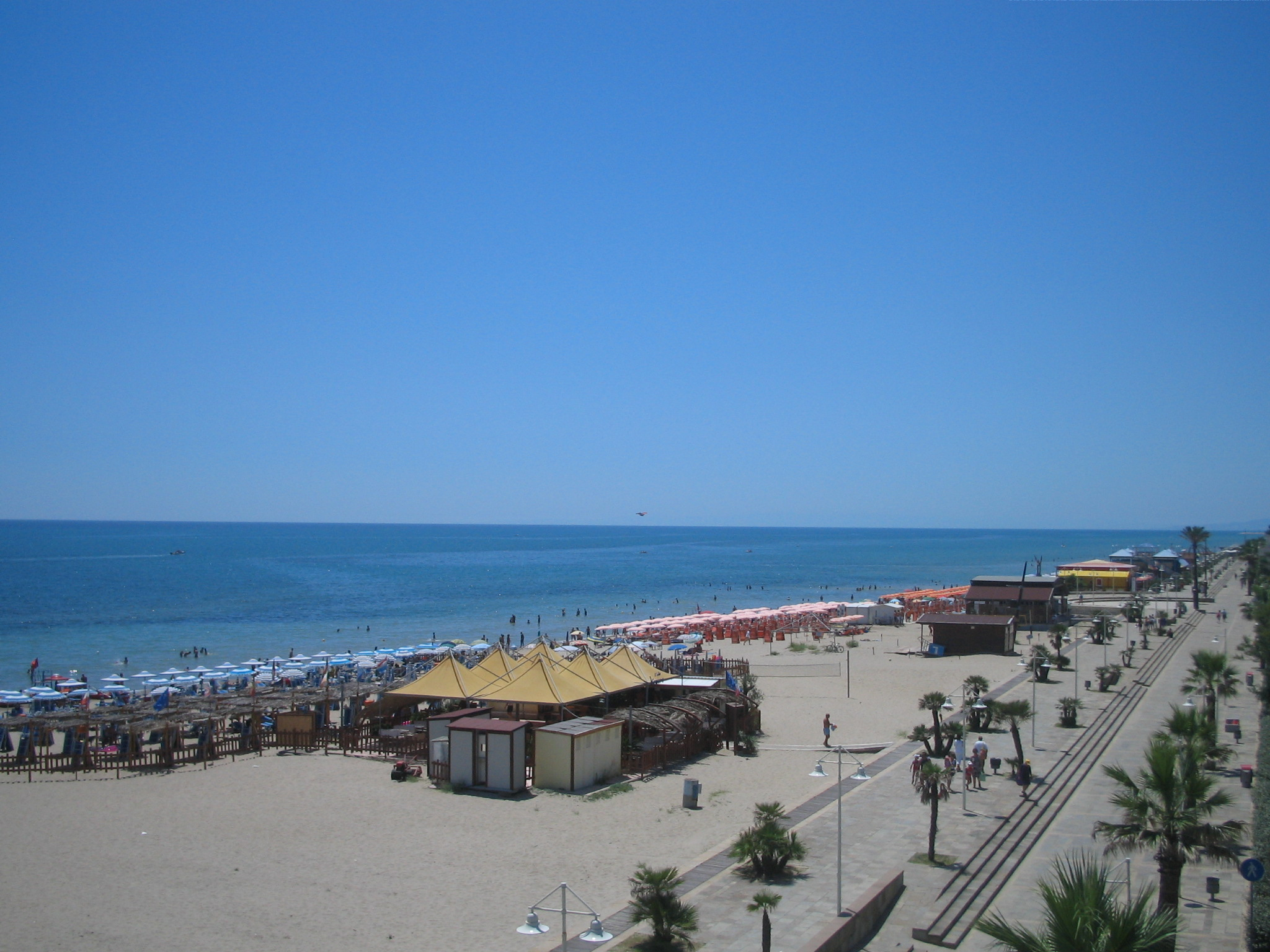
The beach

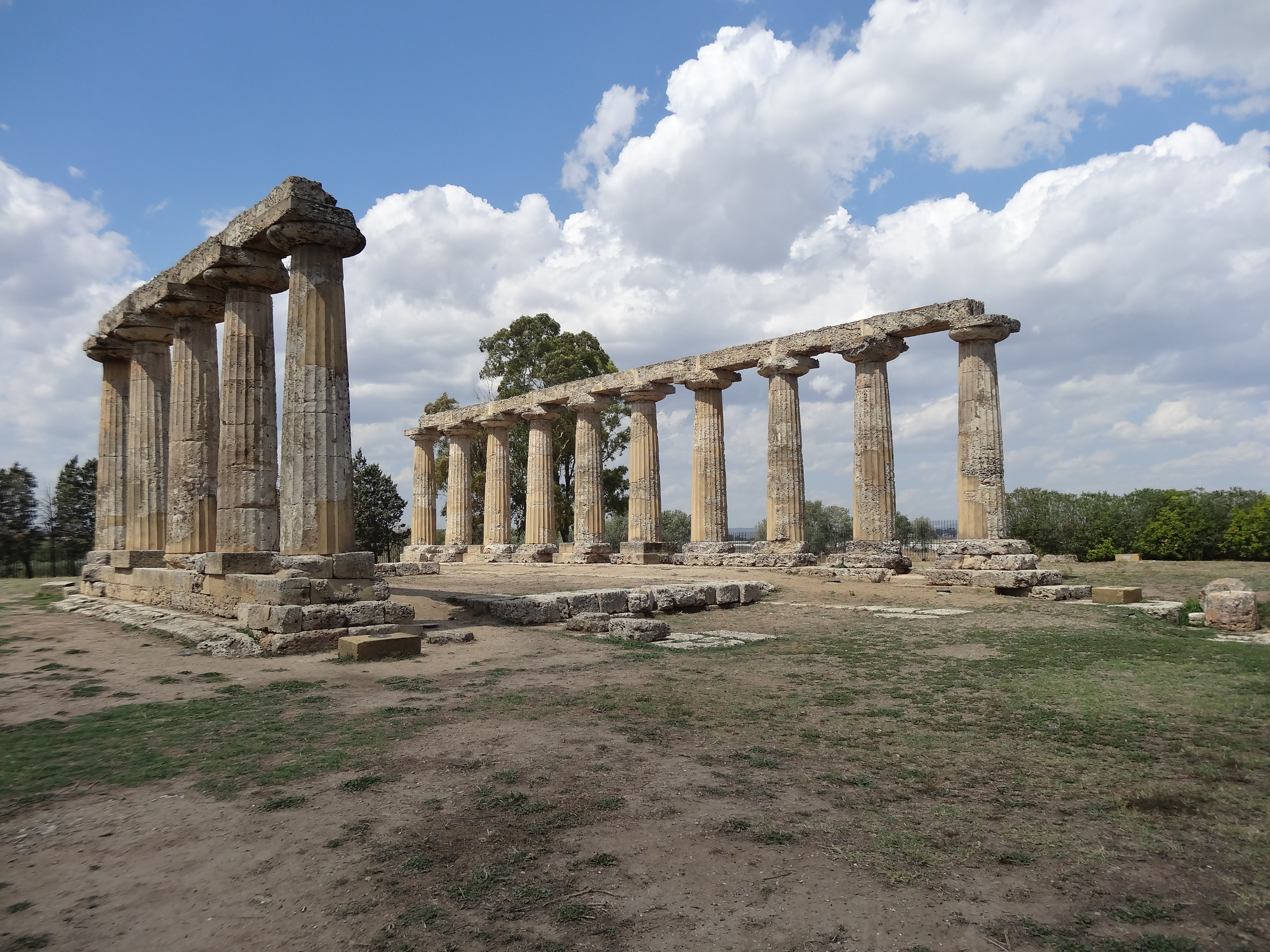
Temple of Hera

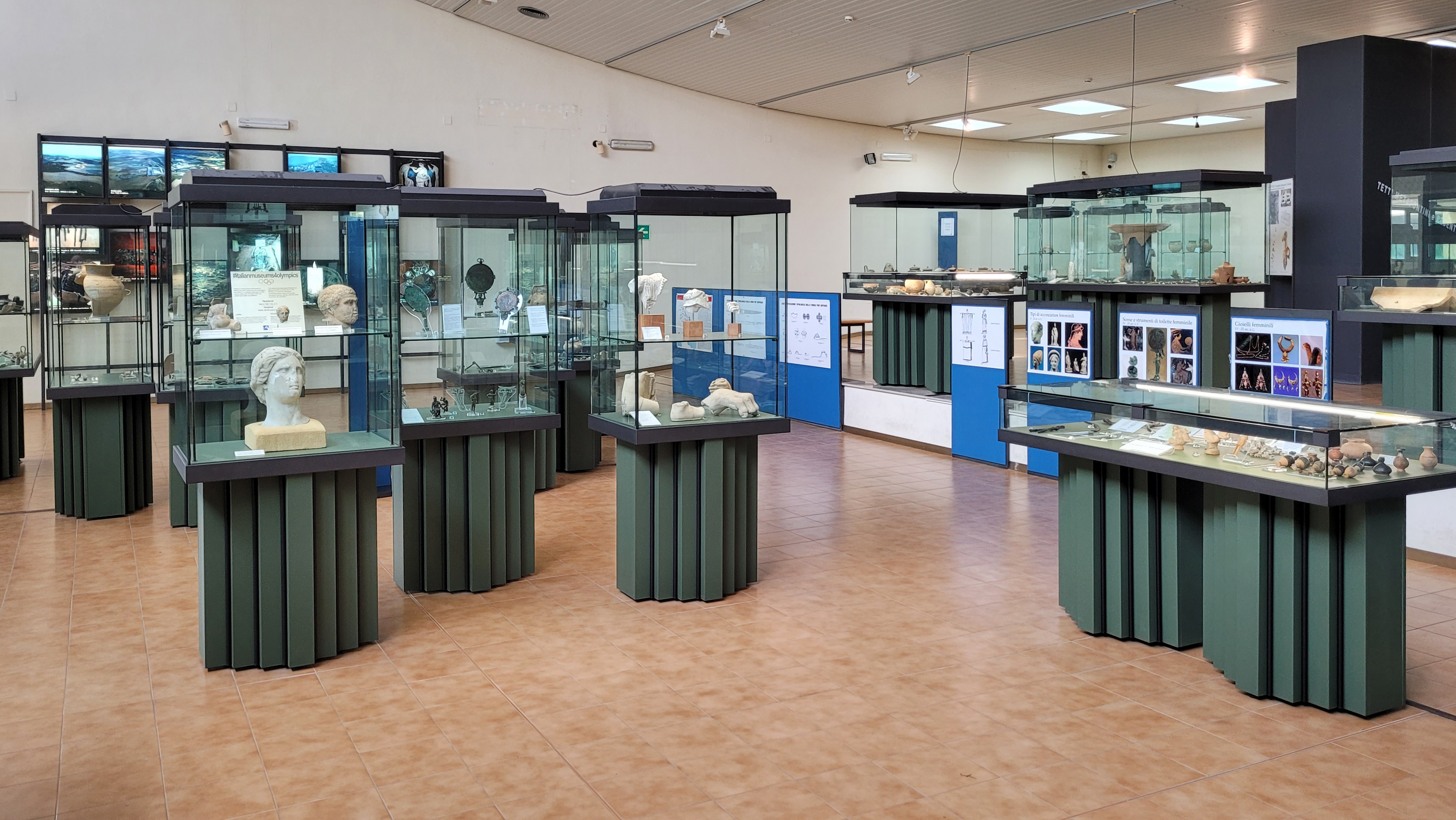
Archaeological museum of Metaponto
