= Trivigno =

- Comune
- Comune di Trivigno
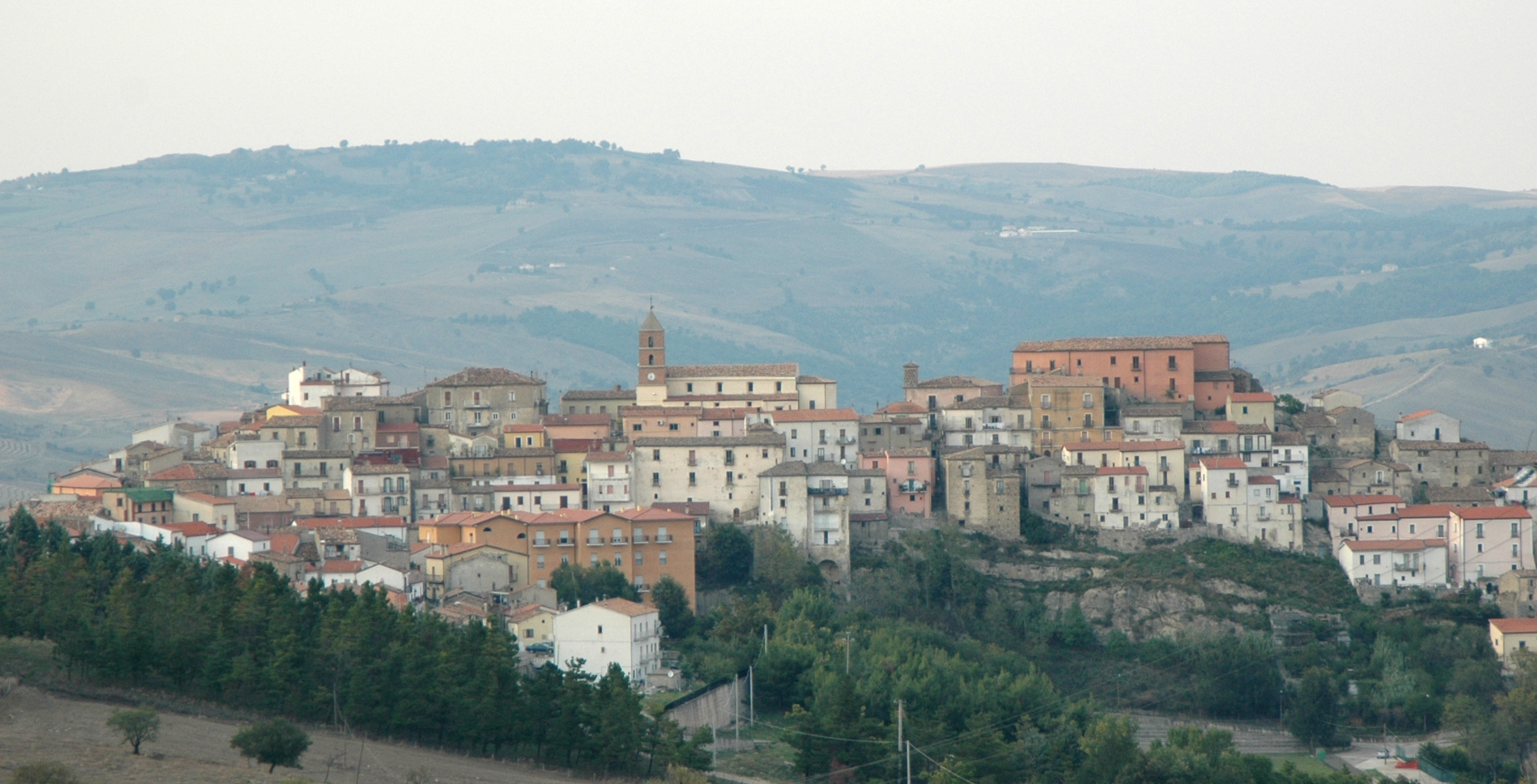
- View of Trivigno

- Location within Italy Location within Basilicata
- Coordinates: 40°35′N 15°59′E
- Country: Italy
- Region: Basilicata
- Province: Potenza (PZ)

Government
  - Mayor: Marco Guarini

Area
  - Total: 26 km^{2} (10 sq mi)
- Elevation: 735 m (2,411 ft)

Population (2007)
  - Total: 735
  - Density: 28/km^{2} (73/sq mi)
- Demonym: Trivignesi
- Time zone: UTC+1 (CET)
  - Summer (DST): UTC+2 (CEST)
- Postal code: 85018
- Dialing code: 0971
- ISTAT code: 076093
- Website: Official website

Trivigno is a town and comune in the province of Potenza, in the Southern Italian region of Basilicata. Its current population is of 590 inhabitants, a drop from its equivalent of 735 in 2007.

It is the birthplace of the silent film actor and director Robert G. Vignola.
