= Albano di Lucania =

- Comune
- Comune di Albano di Lucania
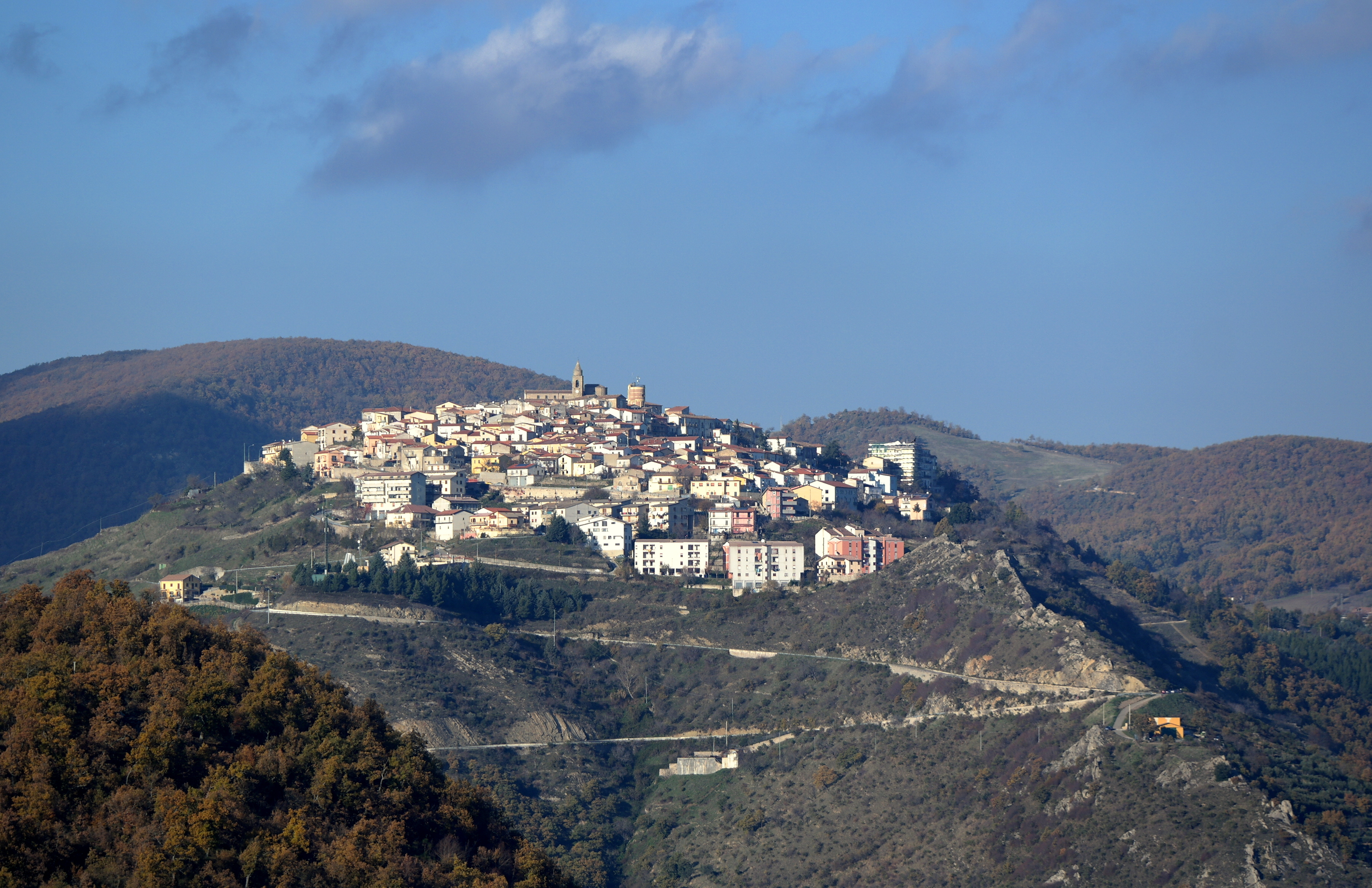
- View of Albano di Lucania

- Location within Italy Location within Basilicata
- Coordinates: 40°35′N 16°2′E
- Country: Italy
- Region: Basilicata
- Province: Potenza (PZ)

Government
  - Mayor: Bruno Santamaria

Area
  - Total: 55.87 km^{2} (21.57 sq mi)
- Elevation: 899 m (2,949 ft)

Population (30 April 2017)
  - Total: 1,420
  - Density: 25.4/km^{2} (65.8/sq mi)
- Demonym: Albanesi
- Time zone: UTC+1 (CET)
  - Summer (DST): UTC+2 (CEST)
- Postal code: 85010
- Dialing code: 0971
- ISTAT code: 076003
- Patron saint: St. Vitus
- Saint day: 15 June
- Website: Official website

Albano di Lucania (Lucano: Albànë) is a town and comune in the province of Potenza, in the southern Italian region of Basilicata.

== History ==
The village's origins are uncertain due to limited written records. Over the centuries, it was ruled by various noble families: the D'Alba until 1301, followed by the Pipino family. In the fifteenth and sixteenth centuries, Albano was part of the Sanseverino fiefdom, and until 1800, it was under the rule of the dukes Ruggiero.

During World War II, a family of Austrian Jewish refugees (a father, mother, and child) were confined to forced residence in Albano. They were liberated with the arrival of the Allied army in September 1943.

== Main sights ==
The main sight in the town is the Mother Church of Santa Maria Maggiore (previously: chiesa Madonna della neve).

== Ethnography ==
During 1956 and 1957, Albano served as the destination for Ernesto de Martino's ethnographic expedition to Basilicata. Specifically, from July 31 to August 17, 1956, the focus was on studying popular songs and funeral rituals, followed by a broader survey from May 15 to June 10, 1957, including neighboring areas, on healers and their clients. The findings from this research were later summarized in a chapter of the book 'Sud e magia'.
