= List of municipalities of the Province of Potenza =

The following is a list of the 100 municipalities (comuni) of the Province of Potenza in the region of Basilicata in Italy.

== List ==
| Municipality | Population (2026) | Area (km²) | Density |
|---|---|---|---|
| Abriola | 1,195 | 97.19 | 12.3 |
| Acerenza | 2,007 | 77.64 | 25.9 |
| Albano di Lucania | 1,275 | 55.87 | 22.8 |
| Anzi | 1,445 | 77.10 | 18.7 |
| Armento | 535 | 58.98 | 9.1 |
| Atella | 3,574 | 88.48 | 40.4 |
| Avigliano | 10,318 | 85.48 | 120.7 |
| Balvano | 1,650 | 42.15 | 39.1 |
| Banzi | 1,131 | 83.06 | 13.6 |
| Baragiano | 2,477 | 29.60 | 83.7 |
| Barile | 2,491 | 24.13 | 103.2 |
| Bella | 4,530 | 99.71 | 45.4 |
| Brienza | 3,844 | 82.94 | 46.3 |
| Brindisi Montagna | 757 | 59.88 | 12.6 |
| Calvello | 1,709 | 106.40 | 16.1 |
| Calvera | 347 | 16.01 | 21.7 |
| Campomaggiore | 689 | 12.48 | 55.2 |
| Cancellara | 1,088 | 42.50 | 25.6 |
| Carbone | 475 | 48.53 | 9.8 |
| Castelgrande | 783 | 34.90 | 22.4 |
| Castelluccio Inferiore | 1,854 | 28.96 | 64.0 |
| Castelluccio Superiore | 703 | 32.98 | 21.3 |
| Castelmezzano | 684 | 33.91 | 20.2 |
| Castelsaraceno | 1,112 | 74.78 | 14.9 |
| Castronuovo di Sant'Andrea | 833 | 47.45 | 17.6 |
| Cersosimo | 496 | 24.75 | 20.0 |
| Chiaromonte | 1,685 | 70.02 | 24.1 |
| Corleto Perticara | 2,303 | 89.34 | 25.8 |
| Episcopia | 1,188 | 28.64 | 41.5 |
| Fardella | 568 | 29.08 | 19.5 |
| Filiano | 2,609 | 71.81 | 36.3 |
| Forenza | 1,726 | 116.31 | 14.8 |
| Francavilla in Sinni | 3,823 | 46.82 | 81.7 |
| Gallicchio | 747 | 23.63 | 31.6 |
| Genzano di Lucania | 5,036 | 208.93 | 24.1 |
| Ginestra | 655 | 13.32 | 49.2 |
| Grumento Nova | 1,514 | 66.65 | 22.7 |
| Guardia Perticara | 502 | 53.68 | 9.4 |
| Lagonegro | 4,905 | 113.07 | 43.4 |
| Latronico | 3,950 | 76.66 | 51.5 |
| Laurenzana | 1,528 | 95.71 | 16.0 |
| Lauria | 11,651 | 176.63 | 66.0 |
| Lavello | 12,820 | 134.67 | 95.2 |
| Maratea | 4,514 | 67.84 | 66.5 |
| Marsico Nuovo | 3,680 | 100.97 | 36.4 |
| Marsicovetere | 5,680 | 38.01 | 149.4 |
| Maschito | 1,398 | 45.82 | 30.5 |
| Melfi | 16,804 | 206.23 | 81.5 |
| Missanello | 464 | 22.34 | 20.8 |
| Moliterno | 3,487 | 98.55 | 35.4 |
| Montemilone | 1,371 | 114.14 | 12.0 |
| Montemurro | 1,021 | 56.87 | 18.0 |
| Muro Lucano | 4,828 | 126.18 | 38.3 |
| Nemoli | 1,367 | 19.49 | 70.1 |
| Noepoli | 717 | 46.71 | 15.4 |
| Oppido Lucano | 3,468 | 54.88 | 63.2 |
| Palazzo San Gervasio | 4,249 | 62.91 | 67.5 |
| Paterno | 2,951 | 40.74 | 72.4 |
| Pescopagano | 1,597 | 69.84 | 22.9 |
| Picerno | 5,581 | 78.51 | 71.1 |
| Pietragalla | 3,742 | 66.10 | 56.6 |
| Pietrapertosa | 848 | 67.70 | 12.5 |
| Pignola | 6,755 | 56.24 | 120.1 |
| Potenza | 63,403 | 175.43 | 361.4 |
| Rapolla | 4,080 | 29.87 | 136.6 |
| Rapone | 827 | 29.51 | 28.0 |
| Rionero in Vulture | 12,325 | 53.52 | 230.3 |
| Ripacandida | 1,528 | 33.49 | 45.6 |
| Rivello | 2,417 | 69.58 | 34.7 |
| Roccanova | 1,235 | 61.74 | 20.0 |
| Rotonda | 3,100 | 42.92 | 72.2 |
| Ruoti | 3,164 | 55.45 | 57.1 |
| Ruvo del Monte | 935 | 32.62 | 28.7 |
| San Chirico Nuovo | 1,076 | 23.39 | 46.0 |
| San Chirico Raparo | 865 | 84.07 | 10.3 |
| San Costantino Albanese | 569 | 43.25 | 13.2 |
| San Fele | 2,493 | 97.70 | 25.5 |
| San Martino d'Agri | 615 | 50.39 | 12.2 |
| San Paolo Albanese | 197 | 30.22 | 6.5 |
| San Severino Lucano | 1,313 | 61.16 | 21.5 |
| Sant'Angelo Le Fratte | 1,293 | 23.10 | 56.0 |
| Sant'Arcangelo | 5,922 | 89.10 | 66.5 |
| Sarconi | 1,421 | 30.69 | 46.3 |
| Sasso di Castalda | 721 | 45.43 | 15.9 |
| Satriano di Lucania | 2,245 | 32.90 | 68.2 |
| Savoia di Lucania | 959 | 32.84 | 29.2 |
| Senise | 6,360 | 97.31 | 65.4 |
| Spinoso | 1,259 | 38.18 | 33.0 |
| Teana | 499 | 19.30 | 25.9 |
| Terranova di Pollino | 951 | 113.07 | 8.4 |
| Tito | 7,002 | 71.27 | 98.2 |
| Tolve | 2,843 | 128.69 | 22.1 |
| Tramutola | 2,812 | 36.65 | 76.7 |
| Trecchina | 2,054 | 38.19 | 53.8 |
| Trivigno | 593 | 26.00 | 22.8 |
| Vaglio Basilicata | 1,754 | 43.36 | 40.5 |
| Venosa | 10,560 | 170.39 | 62.0 |
| Vietri di Potenza | 2,614 | 52.25 | 50.0 |
| Viggianello | 2,577 | 120.83 | 21.3 |
| Viggiano | 3,212 | 89.70 | 35.8 |

== See also ==
- List of municipalities of Basilicata
- List of municipalities of Italy
