= 1857 Basilicata earthquake =

Earthquake in Italy

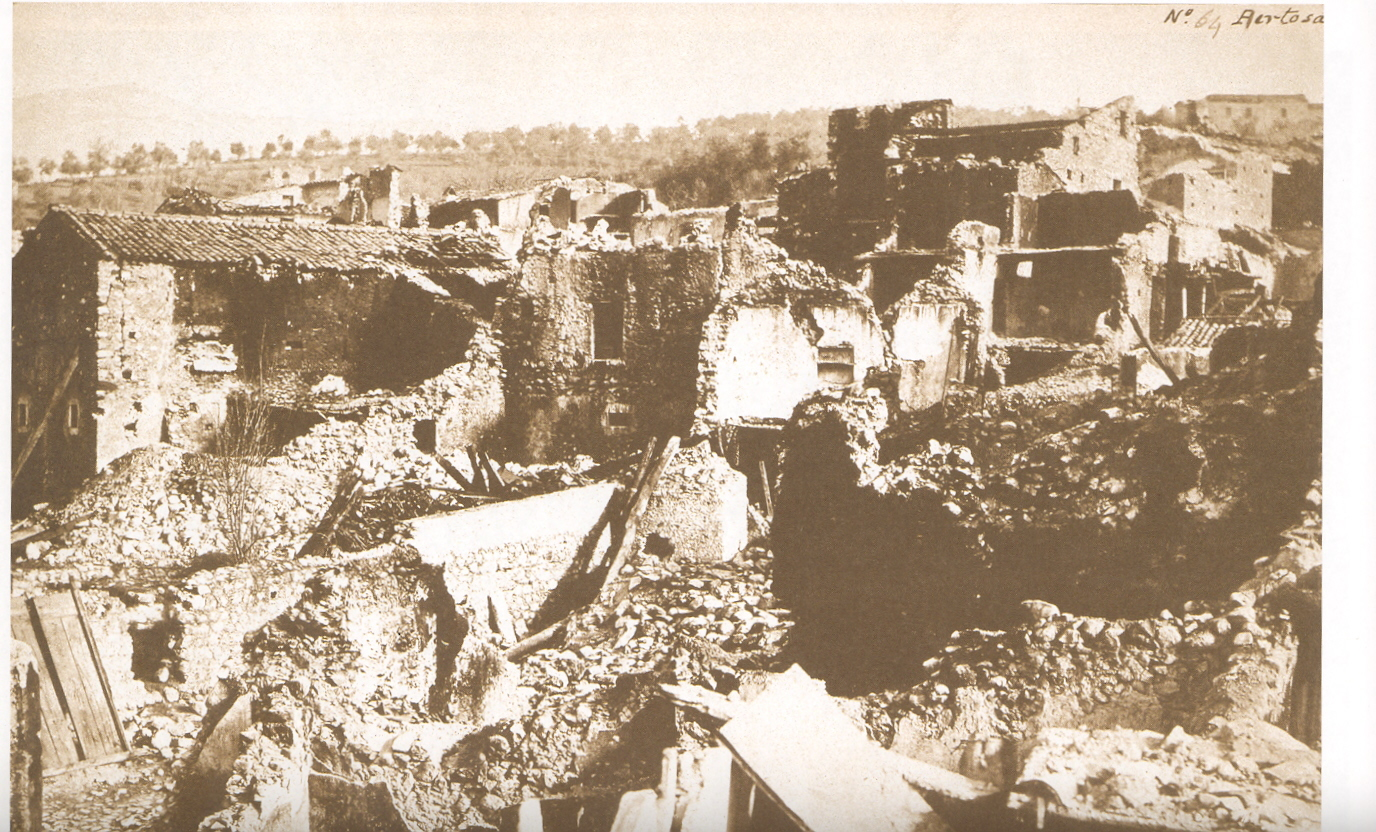
- Damage to the village of Pertosa, a photograph by Alphonse Bernoud

- Location within Italy
- Local date: 16 December 1857
- Local time: 10:15 pm
- Magnitude: 7.0 M_{w} (est)
- Epicenter: Basilicata; 40.5°N 16.5°E
- Areas affected: Kingdom of the Two Sicilies
- Max. intensity: MMI XI (Extreme)
- Casualties: 19,000 dead

The 1857 Basilicata earthquake (also known as the Great Neapolitan earthquake) occurred on 16 December in the Basilicata region of Italy southeast of the city of Naples. The epicentre was in Montemurro, on the western border of the modern province of Potenza. Several towns were destroyed, and there were around 11,000 fatalities according to official sources, but unofficial estimates suggest that as many as 19,000 died. At the time it was the third-largest known earthquake and has been estimated to have been of magnitude 7.0 on the moment magnitude scale.

== Earthquake ==
The principal shock occurred at about 10:15 pm local time on 16 December 1857, with a duration of about 25 seconds. It was preceded by several foreshocks, the largest of which occurred about two minutes before the mainshock. The earthquake was followed by numerous aftershocks, which continued until May 1859, the most damaging of which occurred at about 04:00 local time on 26 December. Another damaging aftershock occurred on 8 March 1858.

The largest foreshock had a duration of 4–5 seconds and affected the area between Balvano and Marsico Nuovo. The maximum intensity of this shock has been estimated to be in the range VII–VIII on the Mercalli–Cancani–Sieberg scale (MCS), based on comparisons with the shaking experienced at Naples and Lagonegro from earthquakes in 1826 and 1893.

== Effects ==
The earthquake was felt over a large area, as far away as L'Aquila to the north, Otranto to the east, Cosenza to the south and Ponza to the west. The strongest shaking, estimated as XI MCS, affected Montemurro and Grumento Nova. In both cases the towns were completely destroyed, with only one or two buildings left standing, although severely damaged. Montemurro was particularly affected by fires that broke out after the earthquake. The area affected by shaking of X MCS was large including, Alianello, Atena Lucana, Brienza, Calvello, Castelsaraceno, Marsico Nuovo, Missanello, Paterno, Polla, Sant'Angelo Le Fratte, Sarconi, Spinoso, Tito, Tramutola and Viggiano. In all of these places there was severe damage with most buildings destroyed.

== Scientific study ==
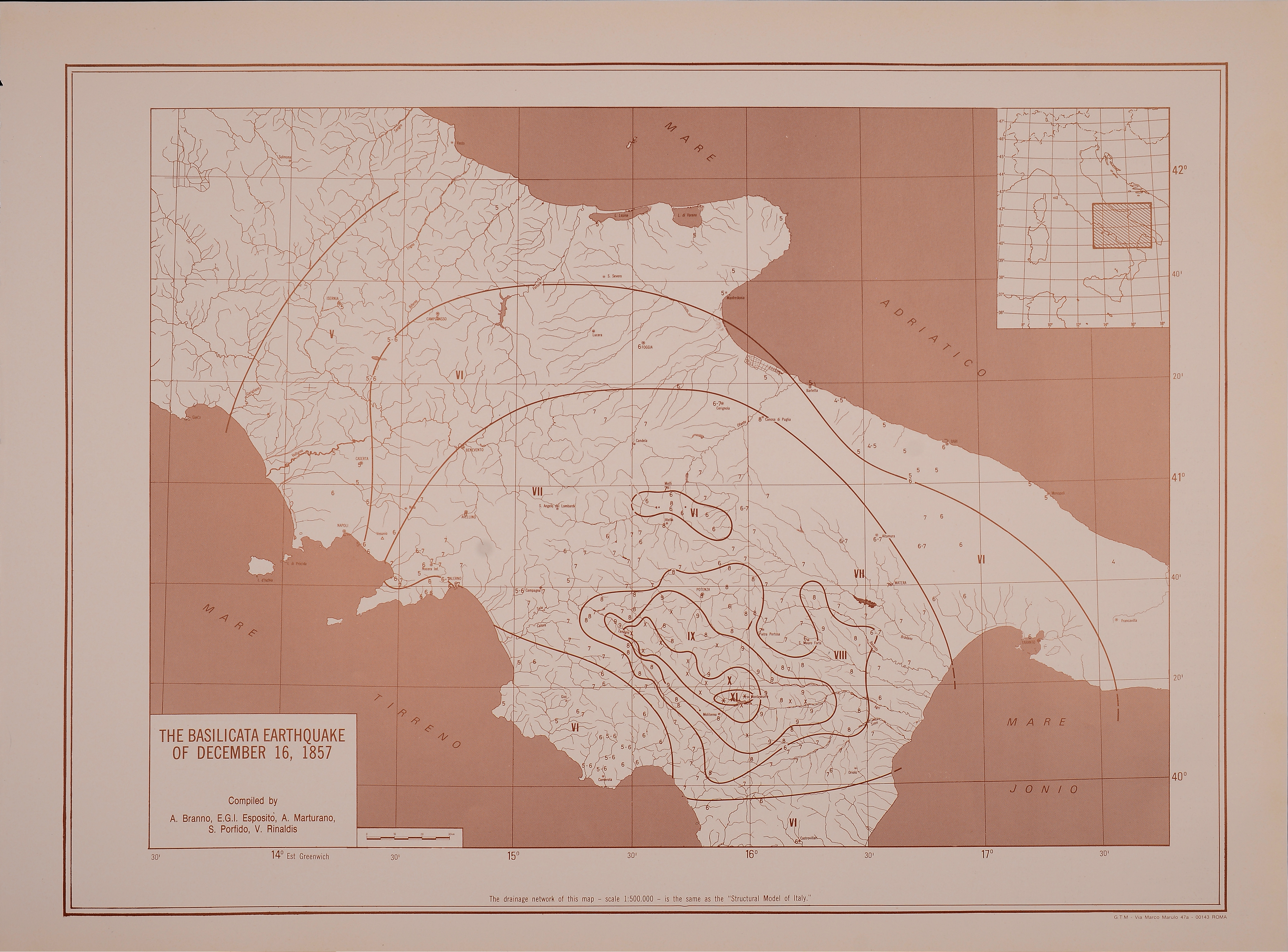
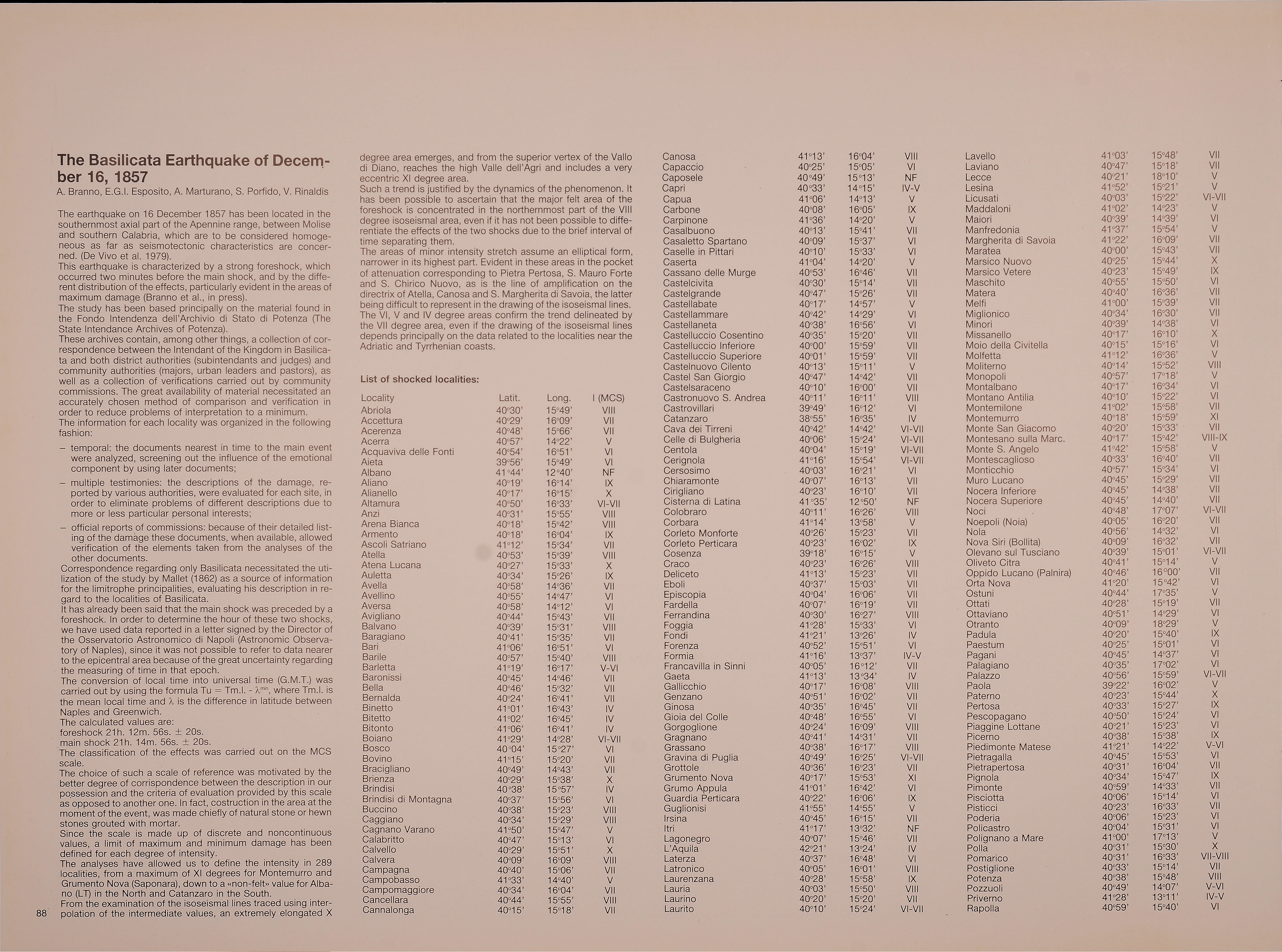
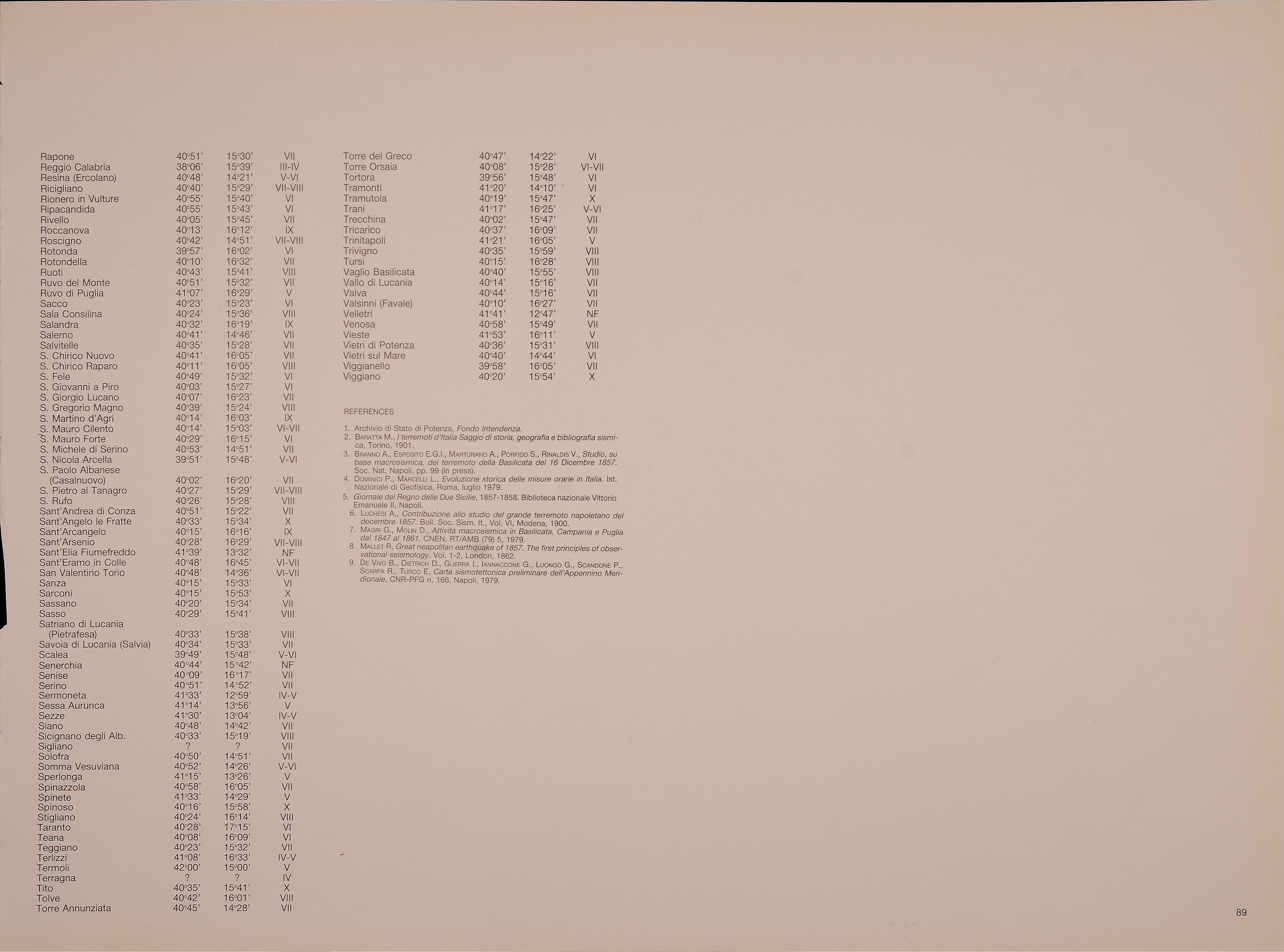
Map and details

Early in 1858, aided by a grant from the Royal Society, Robert Mallet visited the devastated area, and spent over two months studying the effects of the disaster, paying special attention to the damage caused to buildings. His extensive report was published in 1862 and remains a memorable work in the history of seismology. It is believed that Mallet was the first to use photography to record the aftermath of an earthquake. Two French photographers, Alphonse Bernoud and Claude Grillet (misnamed as Grellier by Mallet in his report), were resident in Naples at the time of the earthquake. Between them they supplied Mallet with the 156 photographs that he used, although the extent to which they were directly commissioned by him and which photographer was responsible for some of the images remains uncertain.

Much of Mallet's work was devoted to determining the position and magnitude of the subterranean focus of the earthquake. He calculated that the focal cavity was a curved fissure, about 14 kilometres (8.7 mi) long and 4.8 kilometres (3.0 mi) high and of negligible width. He estimated that the central point of the fissure, the theoretical seismic centre, was 9.25 kilometres (5.75 mi) deep. Mallet located his epicentre near the village of Caggiano, not far from Polla, but later examination of his data suggested that there was a second focus near Montemurro, about 40 kilometres (25 mi) to the southeast.

== See also ==
- List of earthquakes in Italy
- List of historical earthquakes
- List of tsunamis
