= Francavilla in Sinni =

- Comune
- Comune di Francavilla in Sinni
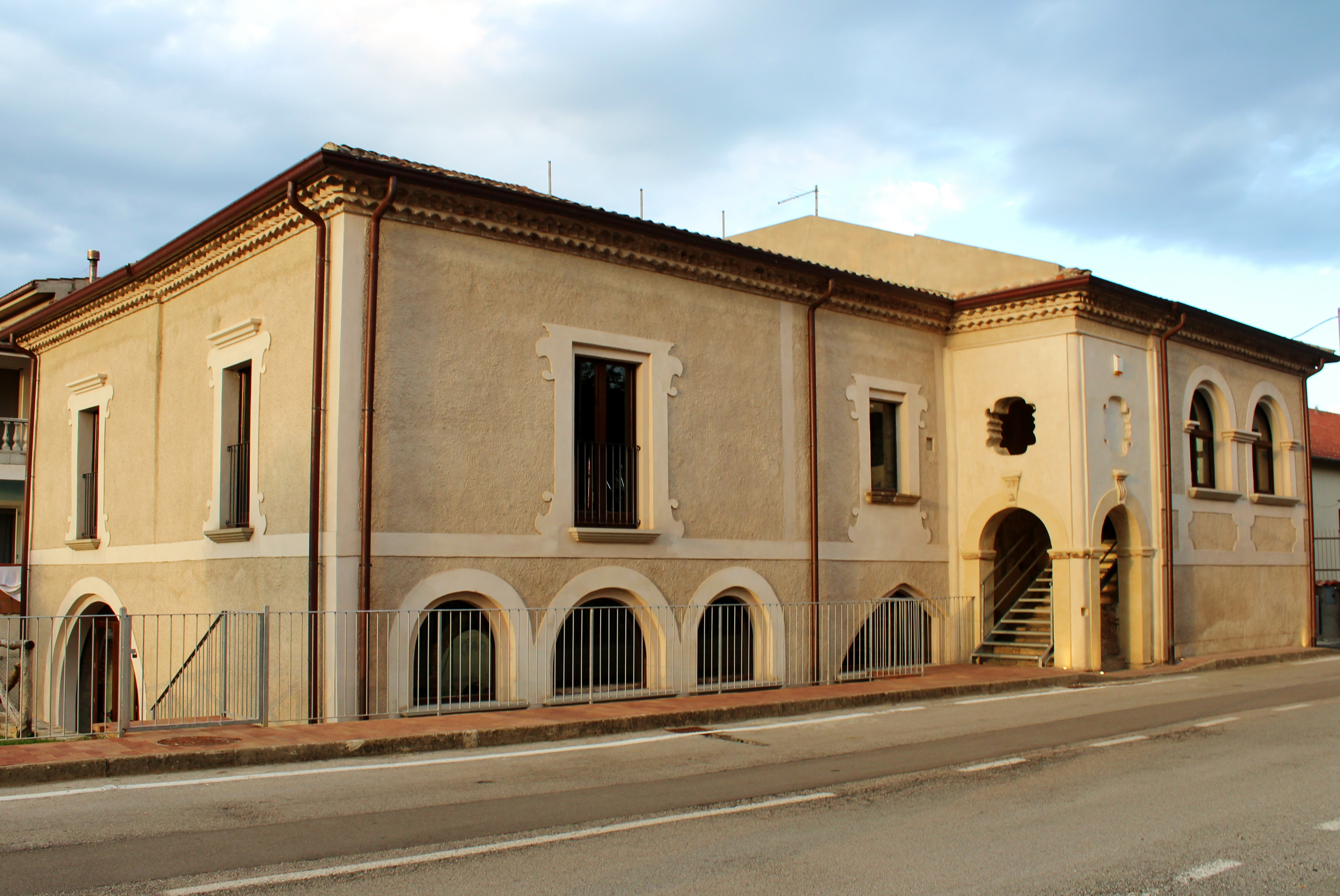

- Francavilla within the Province of Potenza

- Location within Italy Location within Basilicata
- Coordinates: 40°5′N 16°12′E
- Country: Italy
- Region: Basilicata
- Province: Potenza (PZ)

Government
  - Mayor: Romano Cupparo

Area
  - Total: 46.82 km^{2} (18.08 sq mi)
- Elevation: 421 m (1,381 ft)

Population (30 April 2017)
  - Total: 4,176
  - Density: 89.19/km^{2} (231.0/sq mi)
- Demonym: Francavillesi
- Time zone: UTC+1 (CET)
  - Summer (DST): UTC+2 (CEST)
- Postal code: 85034
- Dialing code: 0973
- ISTAT code: 076034
- Patron saint: St. Felix and St. Polycarp
- Saint day: 10 August
- Website: Official website

Francavilla in Sinni (Lucano: Francavill) is a town and comune in the province of Potenza, Basilicata, in southern Italy.

== History ==
The town was founded in 1426. It had a charterhouse, destroyed in early 19th century by the Grande Armée of Napoleon, when it was occupied by the troops of Joachim Murat.

== Geography ==
The municipality borders with Chiaromonte, Fardella, San Severino Lucano, Terranova di Pollino and San Costantino Albanese. The river Sinni crosses its territory to the north.

== Sport ==
The local football club is the F.C. Francavilla, that has its home ground in Nunzio Fittipaldi Stadium.

== Transport ==
Francavilla is served by the SS 653 highway, that links the A2 motorway (at the exit "Lauria Nord", 35 km west) to the Ionian Coast (51 km east), nearby Policoro.

== See also ==
- Brigandage in southern Italy after 1861
