= Pignola-Abriola stratigraphic section =

Pignola-Abriola section (South Italy)

The Pignola-Abriola section is a ~63 m long stratigraphic sequence of cherty limestones deposited in the Lagonegro Basin during the latest Norian and the early Rhaetian Stages (Late Triassic Period). The main outcrop (40°33′23.50″N 15°47′1.71″E) is on the western side of Mount Crocetta along the SP5 road connecting the villages of Pignola and Abriola (Province of Potenza, Basilicata, southern Italy). A smaller outcrop (~7 m thick), overlapping the central part of the main section, is located near a former railway tunnel, few meters below the road level. The Pignola-Abriola section has been recently proposed as GSSP (Global boundary Stratotype Section and Point) of the Rhaetian Stage.

Location of the Pignola-Abriola section in Basilicata Region

== Geological Setting ==
The Pignola-Abriola section belongs to the pelagic/hemipelagic marine deposits of the Lagonegro Basin (southern Apennines). The Lagonegro Basin was part of the south-western branch of the Tethys Ocean, bordered northward by the Apenninic carbonate platform and southward by the Apulian carbonate platform.

The Pignola-Abriola section represents a portion of the Calcari con Selce Formation, a pelagic sequence of carbonatic and siliceous deposits (cherts and radiolarites) covering a period from late Ladinian to Hettangian. The Calcari con Selce Fm. gradually pass to the overlying Scisti Silicei Formation through the increase of the siliciclastic fraction and the deposition of radiolarites ("Transitional Interval") that are the main characteristic of the Scisti Silicei Fm. The Transitional Interval is not isochronous, but is related to the distance from the sediment sources; in facts, the age of the Scisti Silicei base may vary from Rhaetian (distal areas) to Hettangian (proximal areas). This change of sedimentation (carbonatic to siliceous) is intended as a consequence of the subsidence of the seafloor below the Calcite Compensation Depth (CCD).

== Stratigraphy ==
=== Lithostratigraphy ===
The cherty limestones represent the dominant lithology in the Pignola-Abriola section, sometimes intercalated with calcarenites from gravity flows/turbidites. Dolomitization is present in the lower part of the section, whereas the siliciclastic fraction becomes more abundant in the upper part (as well as the silicification of the limestones). This increment of terrigenous input in the basin is attested by the gradually increase of shales, radiolarites and marls (beginning of the transition to the Scisti Silicei Fm.). The shales are mostly dark and rich in organic matter, suggesting anoxic/disoxyc conditions.

=== Biostratigraphy ===
The main fossils recovered in the Pignola-Abriola section are conodonts and radiolarians. Conodonts especially are very common throughout the entire section, but rare around the Norian-Rhaetian boundary (as observed even in other sections). Anyway, the main marker of the Rhaetian base, conodont Misikella posthernsteini, has been recovered at level 45 m (148 ft). Radiolarians are also present, but only in the medium part of the section. Two assemblages have been recovered: Betraccium deweveri, typical of upper Norian; and Proparvicingula moniliformis, typical of the lower Rhaetian.

=== Chemostratigraphy ===
The record of the stable carbon isotope ^{13}C from organic matter (δ^{13}C_{org}) shows a large negative shift (~6‰) around the Norian-Rhaetian boundary, which indicates a perturbation in the carbon cycle. This shift lead to a negative peak of -29.95‰ that occurs at the same level of the First Appearance Datum (FAD) of conodont Misikella posthernsteini. This means that the negative peak could be used as a geochemical marker for the Rhaetian. The negative trend of δ^{13}C_{org} is mirrored by the ^{13}C curve from carbonates (δ^{13}C_{carb}), indicating that the isotopic record in Pignola-Abriola is primary.

=== Magnetostratigraphy ===
The sequence of geomagnetic polarity reversals along the Pignola-Abriola section defined ten magnetozones (five normal and five reverse) that have been associated to the E13r-E20r polarity interval in the Newark Astrochronological Polarity Time Scale (Newark-APTS). The characteristic of the Newark-APTS is the calibration of the magnetostratigraphy with a time scale based on the astronomic cycles recognized in the stratigraphic sequence (covering the entire Late Triassic, from Carnian to Hettangian). The correlation between the Pignola-Abriola section and the Newark-APTS has been statistically evaluated using a Student's t-test, comparing the thickness of the magnetozones in Pignola-Abriola with the duration of the magnetozones in the Newark-APTS (as used before for the Carnian-Norian Pizzo Mondello section in Sicily). The basic assumption of this method is that in pelagic basinal sections the sedimentation rates are quite constant and thickness is a proxy of time. Several correlation options has been tested and only one resulted the most accurate. Following the age model derived to the correlation between the Pignola-Abriola section and the Newark-APTS, the stratigraphic level marking the Rhaetian base has been dated at 205.7 Million years ago.

== Potential of the Pignola-Abriola section as GSSP of the Rhaetian Stage ==
The Pignola-Abriola section has been proposed as a candidate for the GSSP of the Rhaetian Stage, fulfilling the main requirements to be selected as a boundary stratotype. This section is in facts characterized by a detailed biostratigraphy (conodonts and radiolarians) with a clear taxonomy and markers for both Stages and Substages boundaries. The chemostratigrahic curves of δ^{13}C_{org} and δ^{13}C_{carb} show three perturbations that lead to a major one at the Norian-Rhaetian boundary. The ~6‰ negative shift associated to the Norian-Rhaetian boundary has been proposed as a physical marker of the Rhaetian, in association with the usual biostratigraphic markers (e.g. FAD of conodont Misikella posthernsteini, base of the Proparvicingula moniliformis radiolarian Zone).

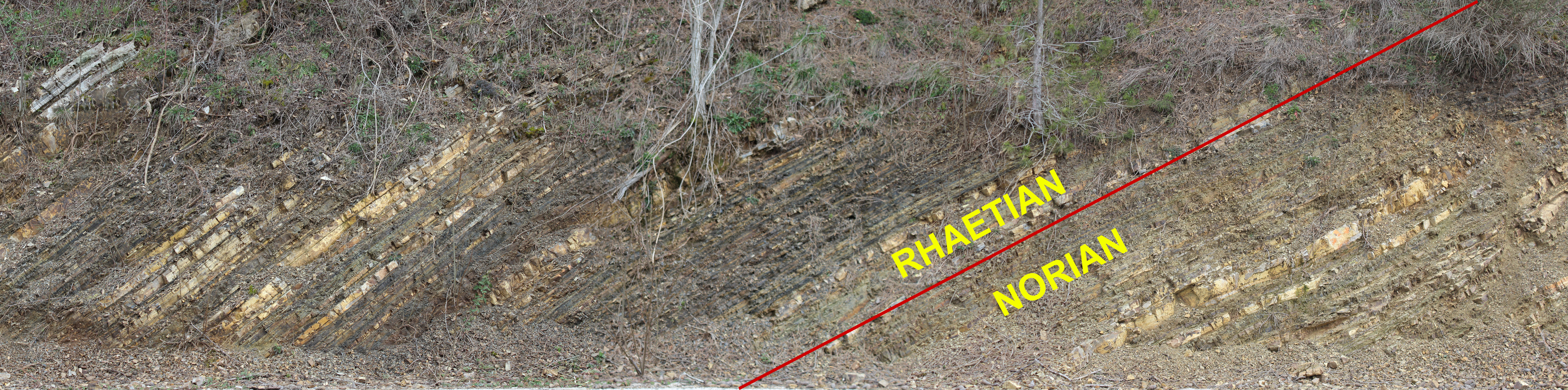
Detail of the Norian-Rhaetian boundary at the Pignola-Abriola section (around level 45 m from the base of the section)

=== Misikella posthernsteini taxonomic issue ===
In 2010, the Rhaetian Working Group of the ICS (International Commission on Stratigraphy) defined the markers defining the base of the Rhaetian Stage. One the main biomarkers was the FAD of conodonts Misikella posthernsteini and Mockina mosheri (morphotype A). M. posthernsteini is the typical marker in Tethys, whereas in North America it appears later than M. mosheri A. Conodont M. posthernsteini is the phylogenetic descent of Misikella hernsteini, and the passage is determined by transitional forms. So, the FAD of M. posthernsteini is determined by the final and fully evolved form. In 2007, the Steinbergkogel section in Austria has been proposed as GSSP candidate for the Rhaetian, placing the Norian/Rhaetian boundary with the FAD of M. posthernsteini. With the proposal of the Pignola-Abriola section as GSSP candidate for the Rhaetian, the specimens defining the Norian/Rhaetian boundary in Steinbergkogel have been reclassified as M. hernsteini/posthernsteini transitional forms, following the taxonomic definition of M. posthernsteini by Giordano et al. The M. posthernsteini sensu stricto represents the entirely developed morphotype.

Of course, the ages related to the FAD of Misikella posthernsteini sensu lato (interpreted as transitional forms) and M. posthernsteini s.s. are different. Following the age model proposed by Maron et al. in 2015, based on the magnetostratigraphic correlation with the Newark APTS, the FAD of M. posthernsteini s.s. is ca. 205.7 Myr old, whereas the FAD of M. posthernsteini s.l. is around 209 Myr ago.

The age of 205.7 Ma is supported by recent U/Pb (Uranium-Lead) radiometric ages from Peru (205.30±0.14, 205.40±0.09 Myr, and 205.70±0.15 Myr ago), calibrated with the Last Occurrence (LO) of Monotis bivalves (marker of the Rhaetian base).
