= Gallicchio =

Gallicchio Griko:Gallikion
- Comune
- Comune di Gallicchio
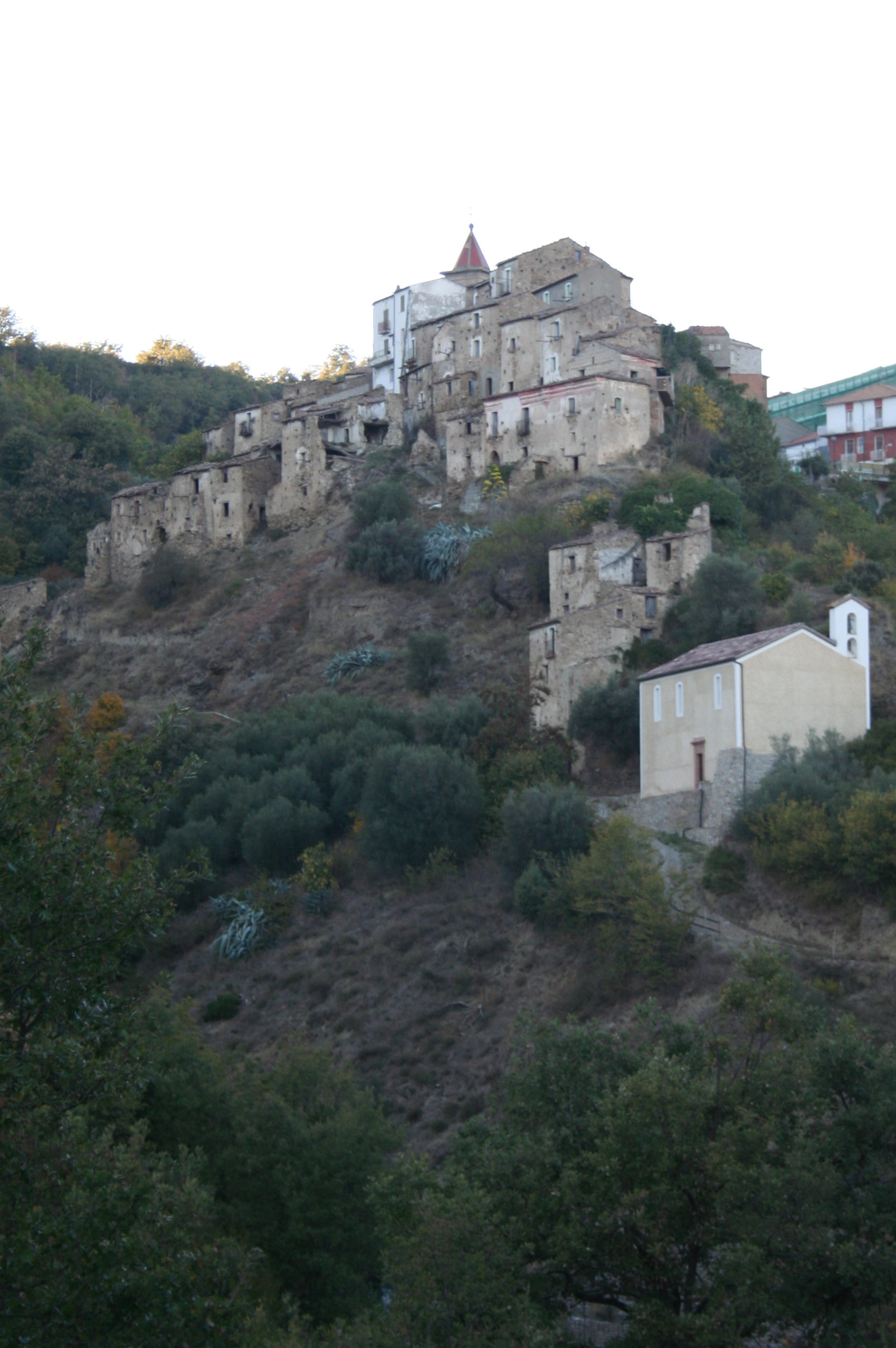
- View of Gallicchio

- Coat of arms

- Location within Italy Location within Basilicata
- Coordinates: 40°17′N 16°8′E
- Country: Italy
- Region: Basilicata
- Province: Potenza (PZ)
- Frazioni: Armento, Guardia Perticara, Missanello, Roccanova, San Chirico Raparo, San Martino d'Agri

Government
  - Mayor: Pasquale Sinisgalli

Area
  - Total: 23 km^{2} (8.9 sq mi)
- Elevation: 730 m (2,400 ft)

Population (31 December 2010)
  - Total: 907
  - Density: 39/km^{2} (100/sq mi)
- Demonym: Gallicchiesi
- Time zone: UTC+1 (CET)
  - Summer (DST): UTC+2 (CEST)
- Postal code: 85010
- Dialing code: 0971
- ISTAT code: 076035
- Website: Official website

Gallicchio is a town and comune in the province of Potenza, in the Southern Italian region of Basilicata.
