= Castelluccio =

Castelluccio may refer to:

== People ==
- Federico Castelluccio (born 1964), Italian-born American actor
- Franco Castelluccio (born 1955), American sculptor
- Frankie Valli, born Francesco Castelluccio (1934), American singer

== Italian locations ==
- Castelluccio dei Sauri, a town and comune in the province of Foggia, Apulia region
- Castelluccio Inferiore, a town and comune in the province of Potenza, Basilicata region
- Castelluccio Superiore, a town and comune in the province of Potenza, Basilicata region
- Castelluccio Valmaggiore, a town and comune in the province of Foggia, Apulia region
- Castelluccio (Norcia), a frazione of Norcia, province of Perugia, Umbria region
- Castelluccio, a frazione of Castel San Giorgio, province of Salerno, Campania region
- Castelluccio, a frazione of Alto Reno Terme, Metropolitan City of Bologna, Emilia-Romagna region
- Castelluccio Cosentino, a frazione of Sicignano degli Alburni, province of Salerno, Campania region
- Castelluccio di Gela, a Hohenstaufen medieval fortification in Gela, Sicily
- Castelluccio di Noto, an archaeological site in Sicily
  - Castelluccio culture, an Ancient Bronze Age culture
