= Spinoso =

- Comune
- Comune di Spinoso
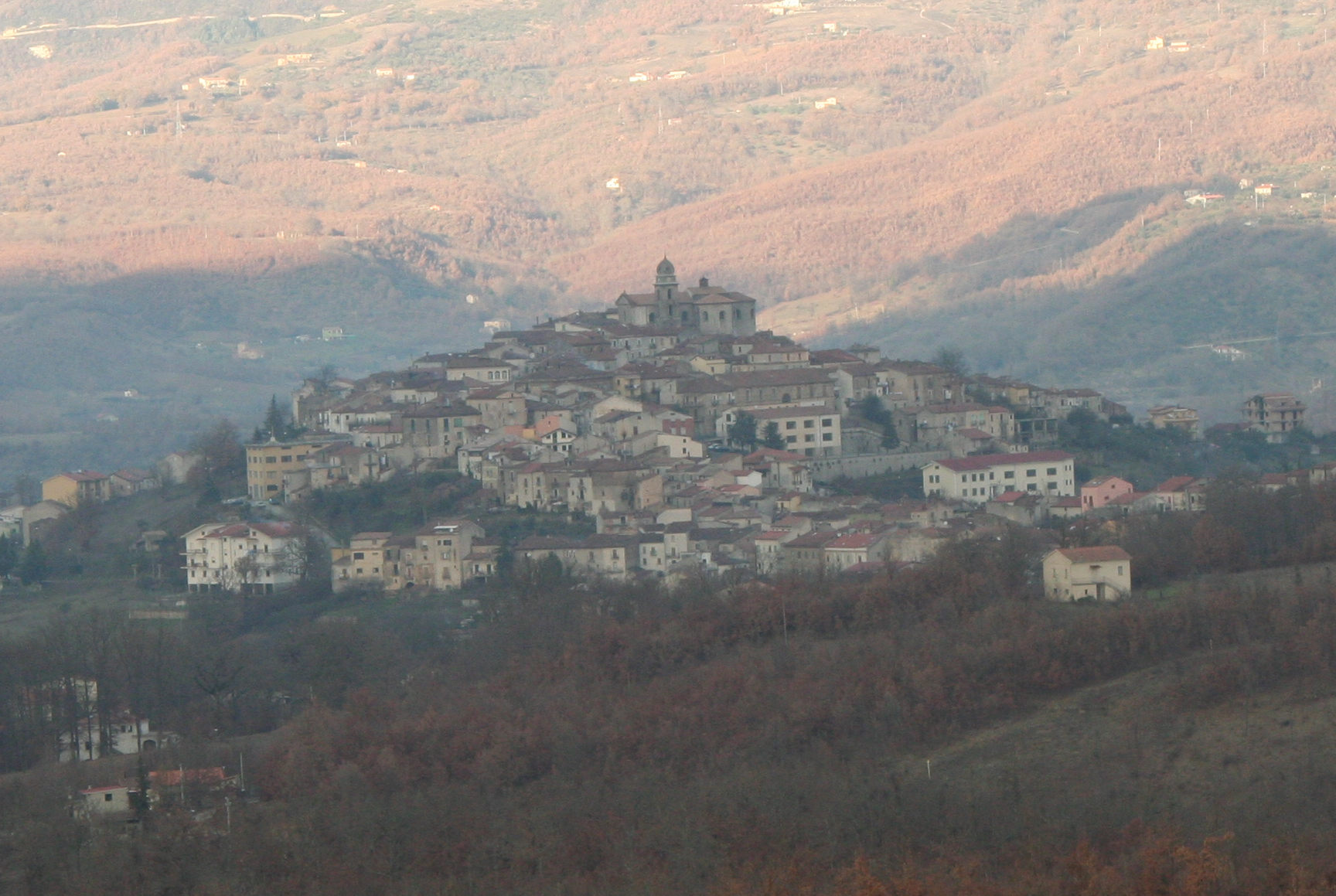
- View of Spinoso

- Location within Italy Location within Basilicata
- Coordinates: 40°16′N 15°58′E
- Country: Italy
- Region: Basilicata
- Province: Potenza (PZ)
- Frazioni: Castelsaraceno, Grumento Nova, Montemurro, San Chirico Raparo, San Martino d'Agri, Sarconi

Area
  - Total: 378 km^{2} (146 sq mi)
- Elevation: 649 m (2,129 ft)

Population (2007)
  - Total: 1,671
  - Density: 4.42/km^{2} (11.4/sq mi)
- Demonym: Spinosesi
- Time zone: UTC+1 (CET)
  - Summer (DST): UTC+2 (CEST)
- Postal code: 85039
- Dialing code: 0971
- ISTAT code: 076086
- Patron saint: Santa Maria Maddalena
- Saint day: 22 July
- Website: Official website

Spinoso is a town and comune in the province of Potenza, in the Southern Italian region of Basilicata.
