= 1857 earthquake =

1857 earthquake may refer to:

- 1857 Basilicata earthquake (Italy)
- 1857 Fort Tejon earthquake (California, US)
- 1857 Parkfield earthquake, see collective article Parkfield earthquake (California, US)

== See also ==
- List of historical earthquakes
