= Genzano =

Genzano may refer to a pair of Italian municipalities:

- Genzano di Roma, in the Province of Rome
- Genzano di Lucania, in the Province of Potenza
