= Monte Caruso =

Mountain in Italy

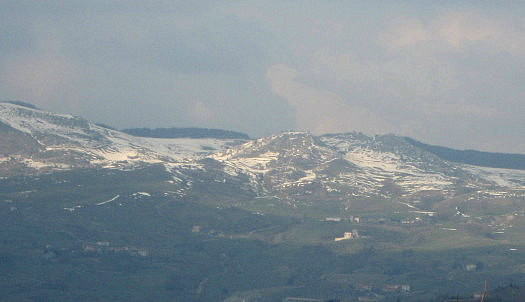

Highest point
- Elevation: 1,236 m (4,055 ft)
- Coordinates: 40°46′N 15°43′E

Geography
- Location within Italy
- Location: Potenza, Basilicata, Italy

Monte Caruso is a mountain in Basilicata, southern Italy.

In World War II, Monte Caruso was the scene of the United States Army fighting against the Germans.
