= Lauria =

Lauria Lauria
- Comune
- Comune di Lauria
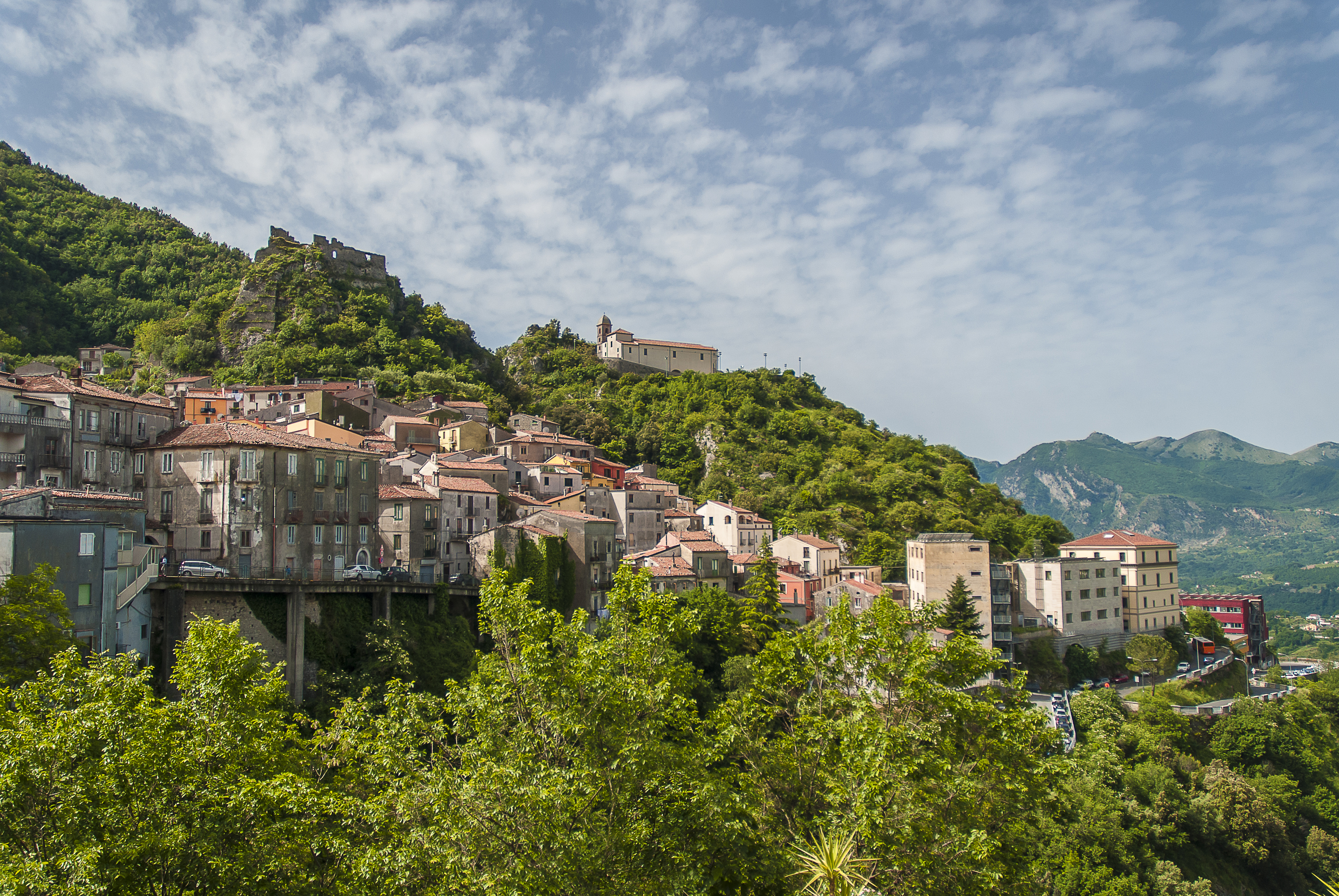
- View of Lauria

- Lauria within the Province of Potenza

- Location within Italy Location within Basilicata
- Coordinates: 40°03′N 15°50′E
- Country: Italy
- Region: Basilicata
- Province: Potenza (PZ)
- Frazioni: see list

Government
  - Mayor: Gianni Pittella (Action (Italian political party))

Area
  - Total: 176.63 km^{2} (68.20 sq mi)
- Elevation: 430 m (1,410 ft)

Population (31 March 2018)
  - Total: 12,669
  - Density: 71.726/km^{2} (185.77/sq mi)
- Demonym: Laurioti
- Time zone: UTC+1 (CET)
  - Summer (DST): UTC+2 (CEST)
- Postal code: 85044
- Dialing code: 0973
- ISTAT code: 076042
- Patron saint: Bl. Domenico Lentini
- Saint day: 25 February
- Website: Official website

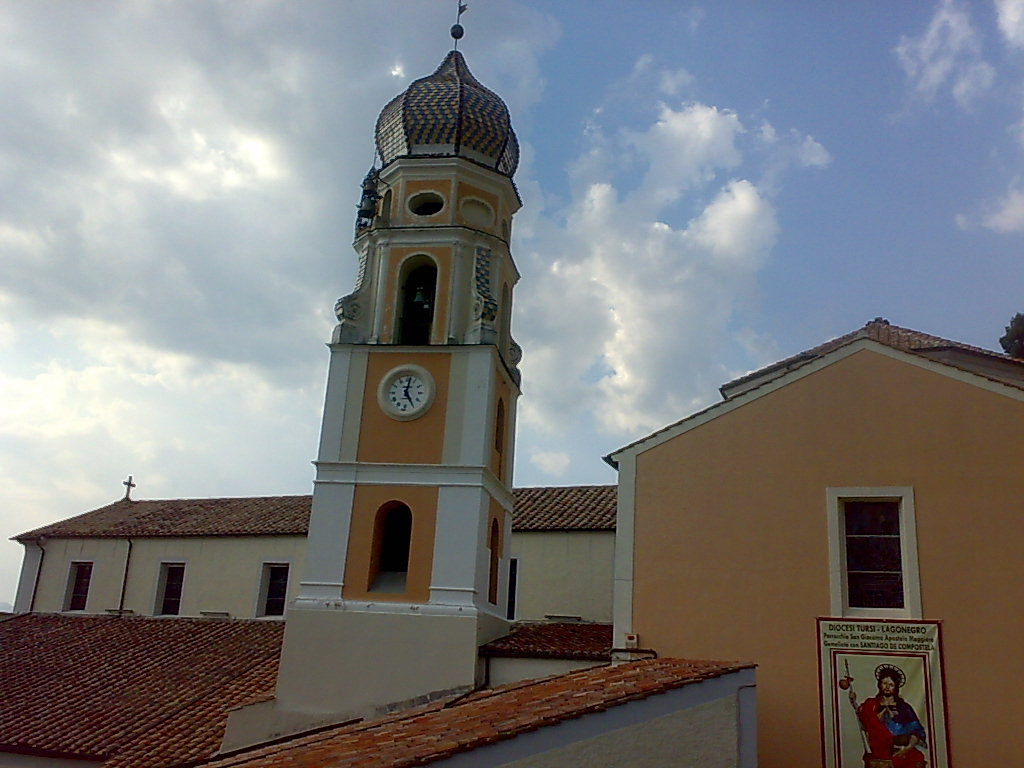
Saint James church

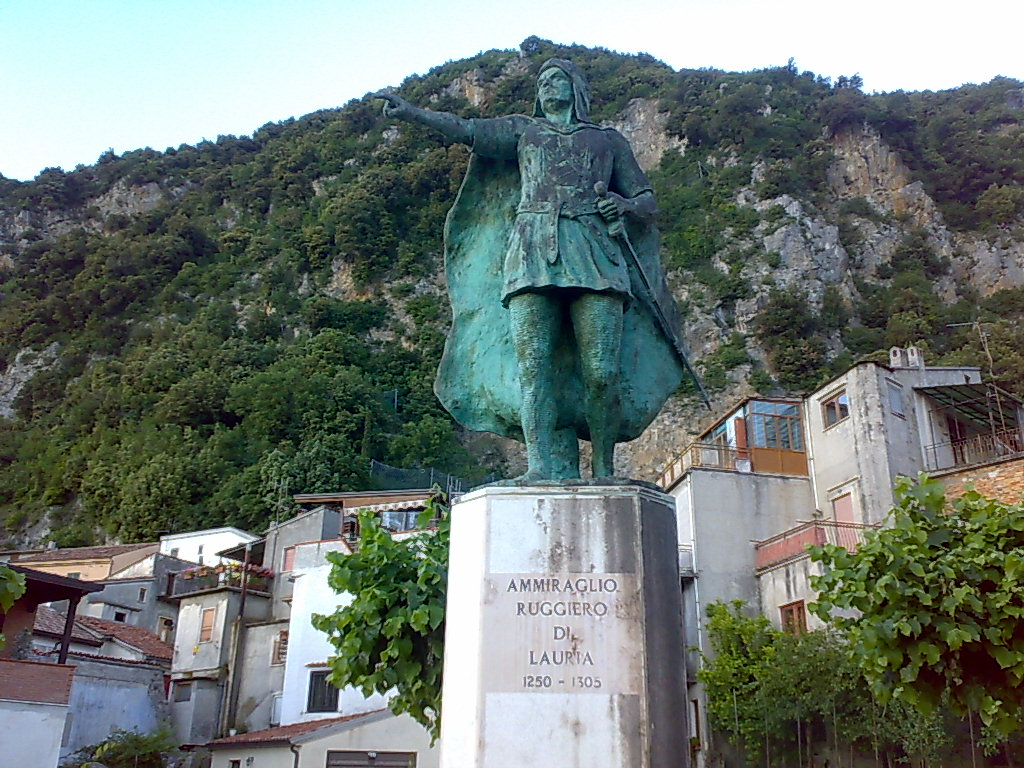
Monument to Roger of Lauria

Lauria is a town and comune of the province of Potenza, in Basilicata, southern Italy, situated near the borders of Calabria. It is a walled, medieval town on the steep side of a hill, with another portion of municipal territory in the plain below.

It is historically the largest city in the southwestern Lucania region.

== History ==
The original nucleus of the city appeared probably in the 10th century, near the place where later the Sanctuary of Madonna dell'Armo was edificated. However, it seems that monastic activity pre-existed in the area, as Lauria just means the "lavra city". The Castle of Lauria, later attributed to Roger of Lauria, was built by Byzantins. In the 12th century Lauria was the seat of a Norman fief, which was held by Gibel and then by his son Richard of Lauria, who died in the battle of Benevento on 1266.

His son Roger of Lauria was a famous admiral of the 13th century.

In 1806 the city was destroyed and the population slaughtered by the French soldiers under general André Masséna, as punishment for having supported the Bourbon kings.

== Geography ==
Located in southern Basilicata and included in the Appennino Lucano - Val d'Agri - Lagonegrese National Park, Lauria is a hill town divided into a pair of districts (in italian, "rioni"): the upper one named "rione superiore" (in ancient times, "Castello", because the presence of its castle) and the lower one named "rione inferiore" (formerly "Borgo"). The municipality borders with Castelluccio Superiore, Castelsaraceno, Lagonegro, Laino Borgo, Latronico, Moliterno, Nemoli, Tortora and Trecchina.

== Main sights ==
- The remains of the Castle (13th century)
- The Sanctuary of the Assunta
- The Mother Church of St. Nicholas
- The church of St. James (15th century)
- The Convent of Immacolata (16th century), with a noteworthy cloister

== Transport ==
Lauria is not served by a near airport, anyway the nearest airport is Salerno-Pontecagnano 129 kilometres (80 mi) from Lauria. Other airports are Lamezia Terme and Napoli-Capodichino.

The town is served by the A2 motorway Salerno-Reggio Calabria, at the exits "Lauria Nord" and "Lauria Sud" and, until the closure in 1979, by the Lagonegro–Castrovillari-Spezzano Albanese railway.

== People ==
- Roger of Lauria – admiral
- Francesco Lorenzo Brancati di Lauria
- Domenico Lentini – priest
- Rocco Papaleo – actor, film director, and singer
- Domenico Pittella – politician
- Gianni Pittella – politician
- Marcello Pittella – politician
