= Teana =

- Comune
- Comune di Teana
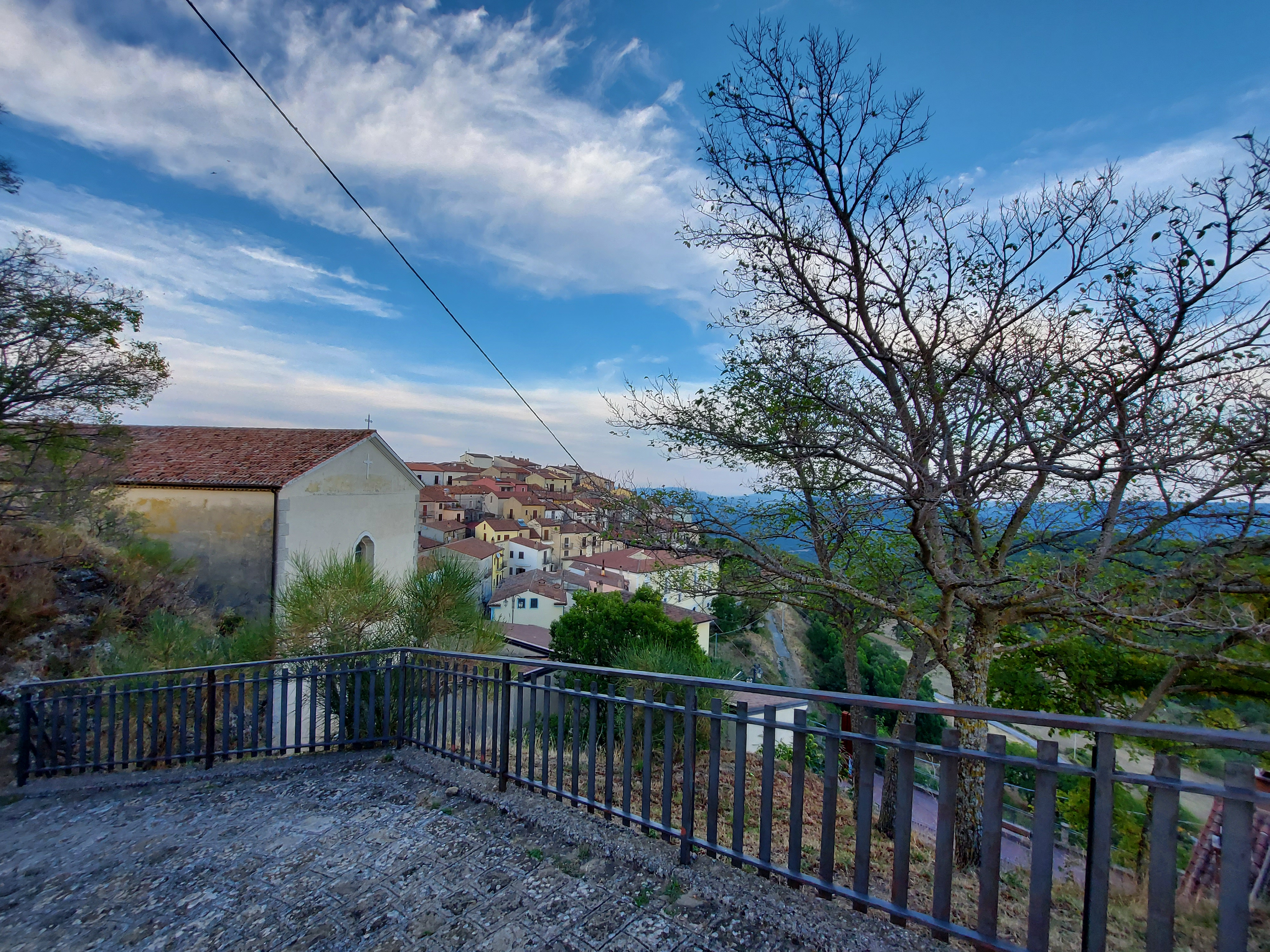
- View of Teana

- Location within Italy Location within Basilicata
- Coordinates: 40°8′N 16°9′E
- Country: Italy
- Region: Basilicata
- Province: Potenza (PZ)

Government
  - Mayor: Vincenzo Fiorenza

Area
  - Total: 19.3 km^{2} (7.5 sq mi)
- Elevation: 806 m (2,644 ft)

Population (December 2008)
  - Total: 683
  - Density: 35.4/km^{2} (91.7/sq mi)
- Demonym: Teanesi
- Time zone: UTC+1 (CET)
  - Summer (DST): UTC+2 (CEST)
- Postal code: 85030
- Dialing code: 0973
- ISTAT code: 076087
- Patron saint: Saint Blaise
- Saint day: 8 August - 9 August
- Website: Official website

Teana is a town and comune in the province of Potenza, in the southern Italian region of Basilicata.

The name Teana is a derivative of the Greek word "Theano", the wife of Pythagoras, the philosopher and mathematician. Local legend states the town was formed from members of Pythagorean school.

The village of 600 is home to a distinctive pasta shape — rasccatieddi di miscchieddu — that was the subject of an episode of the program Shape of Pasta.

== Main sights ==
Some of the local landmarks and points of interest are the ruins of a Lombard Castle, the Church of our Lady of Mount Carmel, the Chapel of San Christofaro, and the Chapel of Santa Maria delle Grazie. In the past, the region was known for the production of silk from silkworms.
