= Tito, Basilicata =

Tito
- Comune
- Comune di Tito
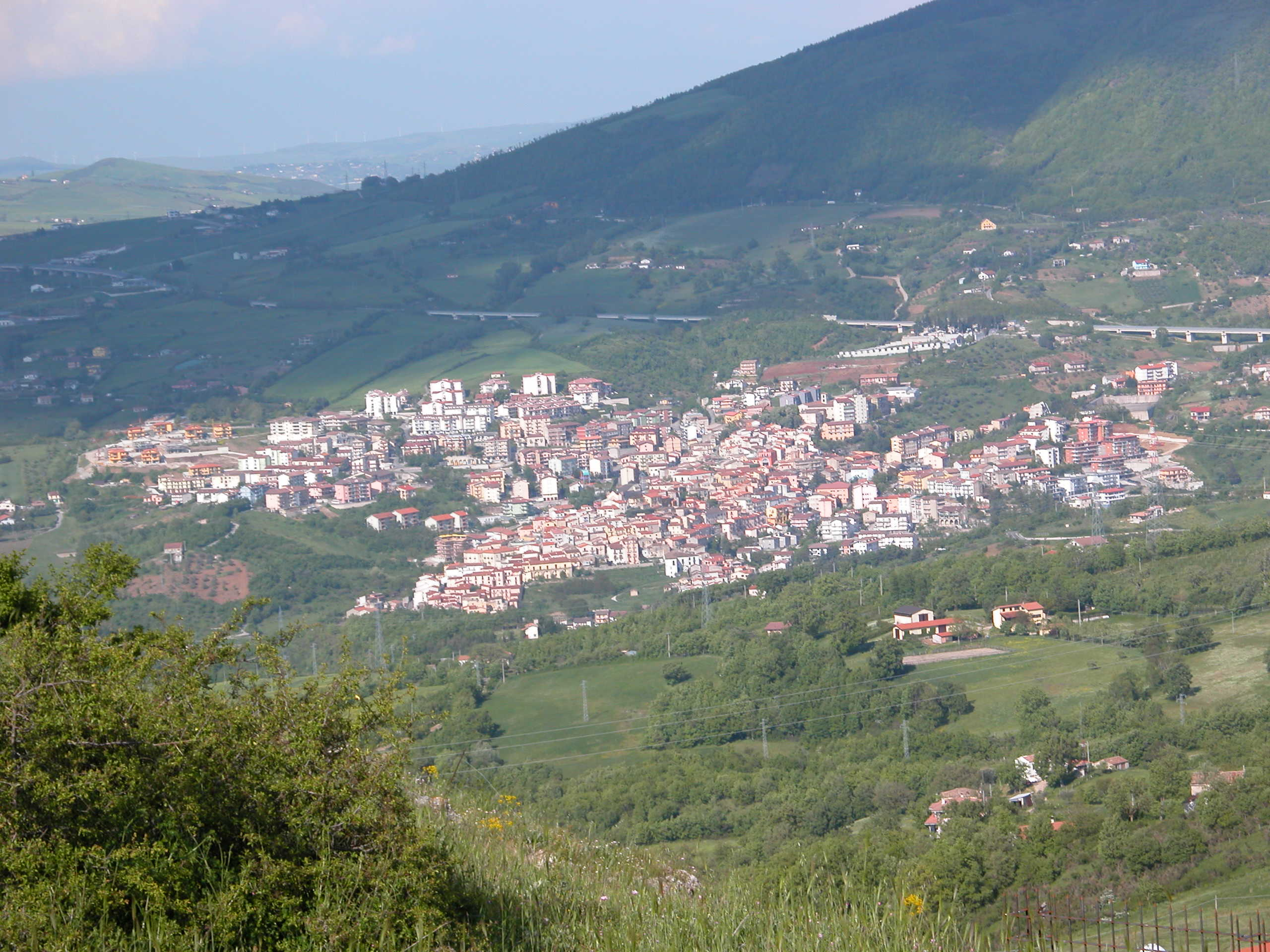
- View of Tito, Basilicata

- Coat of arms

- Location within Italy Location within Basilicata
- Coordinates: 40°35′N 15°41′E
- Country: Italy
- Region: Basilicata
- Province: Potenza (PZ)
- Frazioni: Tito Scalo, Radolena, Frascheto, Rione Mancusi

Government
  - Mayor: Graziano Scavone

Area
  - Total: 70 km^{2} (27 sq mi)
- Elevation: 650 m (2,130 ft)

Population (2021)
  - Total: 4,188
  - Density: 60/km^{2} (150/sq mi)
- Demonym: Titesi
- Time zone: UTC+1 (CET)
  - Summer (DST): UTC+2 (CEST)
- Postal code: 85050
- Dialing code: 0971
- ISTAT code: 076089
- Patron saint: St. Lavierus Martyr
- Saint day: November 17
- Website: Official website

Tito (Lucano: Lu Titu) is a town and comune in the province of Potenza, in the Southern Italian region of Basilicata. It is bounded by the comuni of Abriola, Picerno, Pignola, Potenza, Sant'Angelo Le Fratte, Sasso di Castalda, Satriano di Lucania, Savoia di Lucania.
