= Episcopia, Italy =

Episcopia
- Comune
- Comune di Episcopia
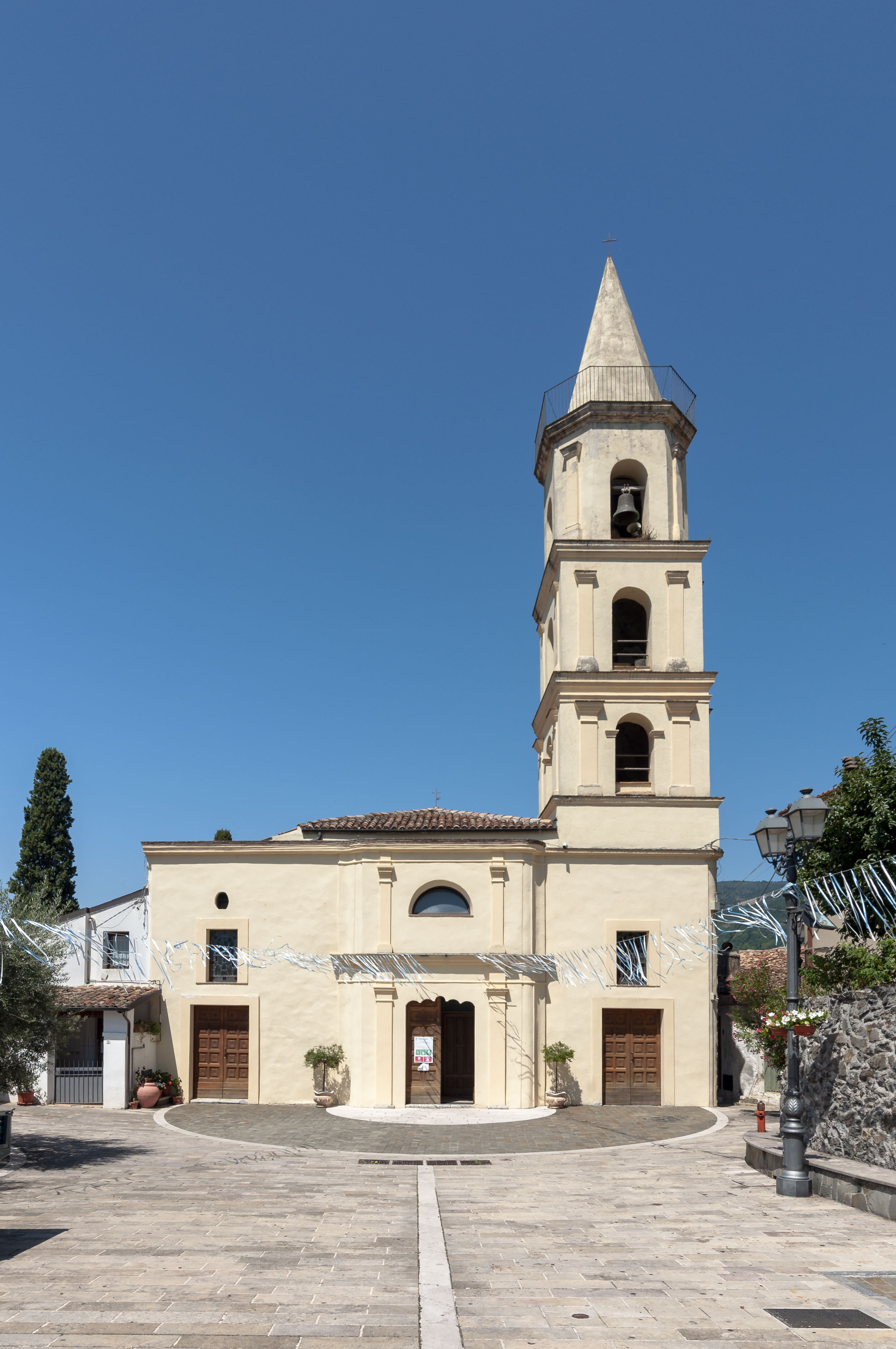
- Church in Episcopia, Italy

- Location within Italy Location within Basilicata
- Coordinates: 40°5′N 16°6′E
- Country: Italy
- Region: Basilicata
- Province: Potenza (PZ)
- Frazioni: Demanio, Fichi D'Antuon, Lago Angella, Manca di Basso, Manca di Sopra

Government
  - Mayor: Egidio Vecchione

Area
  - Total: 28.64 km^{2} (11.06 sq mi)
- Elevation: 530 m (1,740 ft)

Population (December 2008)
  - Total: 1,523
  - Density: 53.18/km^{2} (137.7/sq mi)
- Demonym: Episcopioti
- Time zone: UTC+1 (CET)
  - Summer (DST): UTC+2 (CEST)
- Postal code: 85033
- Dialing code: 0973
- ISTAT code: 076030
- Patron saint: Saint Nicholas
- Saint day: Second Sunday in May
- Website: Official website

Episcopia is a town and comune in the province of Potenza, in the southern Italian region of Basilicata.
