= Anzi, Basilicata =

Anzi
- Comune
- Comune di Anzi
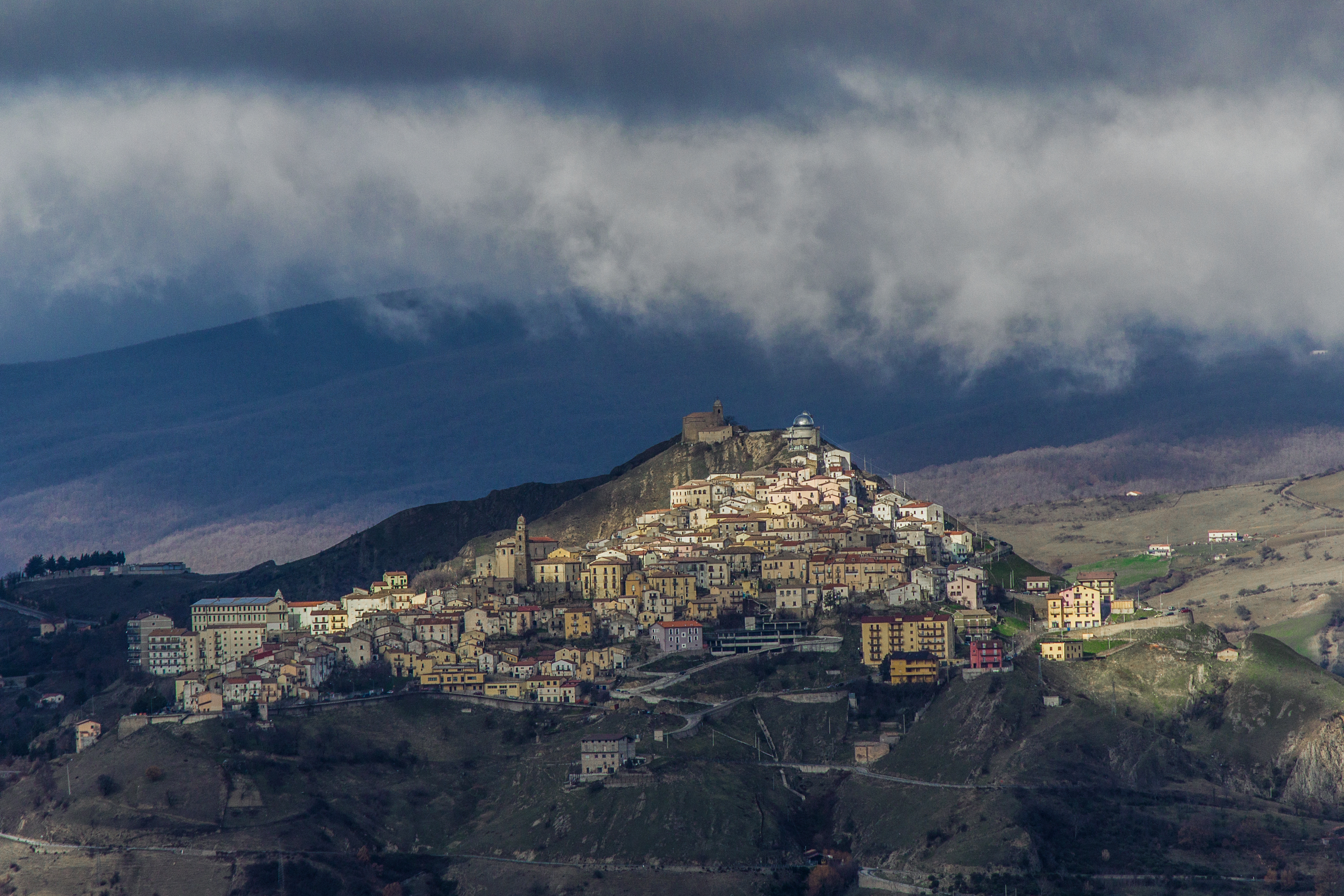
- View of Anzi, Basilicata

- Location of Anzi in Italy Anzi (Basilicata)
- Coordinates: 40°31′4″N 15°55′10″E
- Country: Italy
- Region: Basilicata
- Province: Potenza (PZ)

Government
  - Mayor: Maria Filomena Graziadei

Area
  - Total: 771 km^{2} (298 sq mi)
- Elevation: 1,008 m (3,307 ft)

Population (January 1 2018)
  - Total: 1,626
  - Density: 2.11/km^{2} (5.46/sq mi)
- Demonym: Anzesi
- Time zone: UTC+1 (CET)
  - Summer (DST): UTC+2 (CEST)
- Postal code: 85010
- Dialing code: 0971
- ISTAT code: 076004
- Patron saint: Saint Donatus
- Saint day: August 7
- Website: Official website

Anzi is a town and comune in the province of Potenza, in the Southern Italian region of Basilicata.

== Main sights ==
Anzi boasts the fourth largest static nativity scene in Europe. Since 2008, an astronomical observatory and planetarium has been in service on the summit of Mount Siri, managed by the Teerum Valgemon Aesai voluntary association, based in Anzi. By contacting the association, it is possible to visit the nativity scene and join in the exhibitions at the planetarium, as well as to participate in evenings of celestial observation.

== People ==
- Anthony Celebrezze, United States Secretary of Health, Education and Welfare from 1962 to 1965.
- Giuseppe Di Melfi, alias 'Young Zulu Kid', American flyweight boxer (1897–1977).

== Geography ==
Anzi rises to 1,029 metres (3,376 ft) above sea level, in the central-northern part of the province. It is the fourth highest comune in the region by altitude, after Pietrapertosa, Marsicovetere and Viggiano.

It is bounded by the comuni of Abriola (17 km), Brindisi Montagna (19 km), Calvello (15 km), Castelmezzano (21 km), Laurenzana (11 km), Pignola (23 km), Potenza (25 km), Trivigno (16 km). It lies exactly 25 kilometres (16 mi) from Potenza and 91 kilometres (57 mi) from the other province of Basilicata, Matera.

== Twin towns ==
- Ripacandida, Italy
