= Montemilone =

- Comune
- Comune di Montemilone
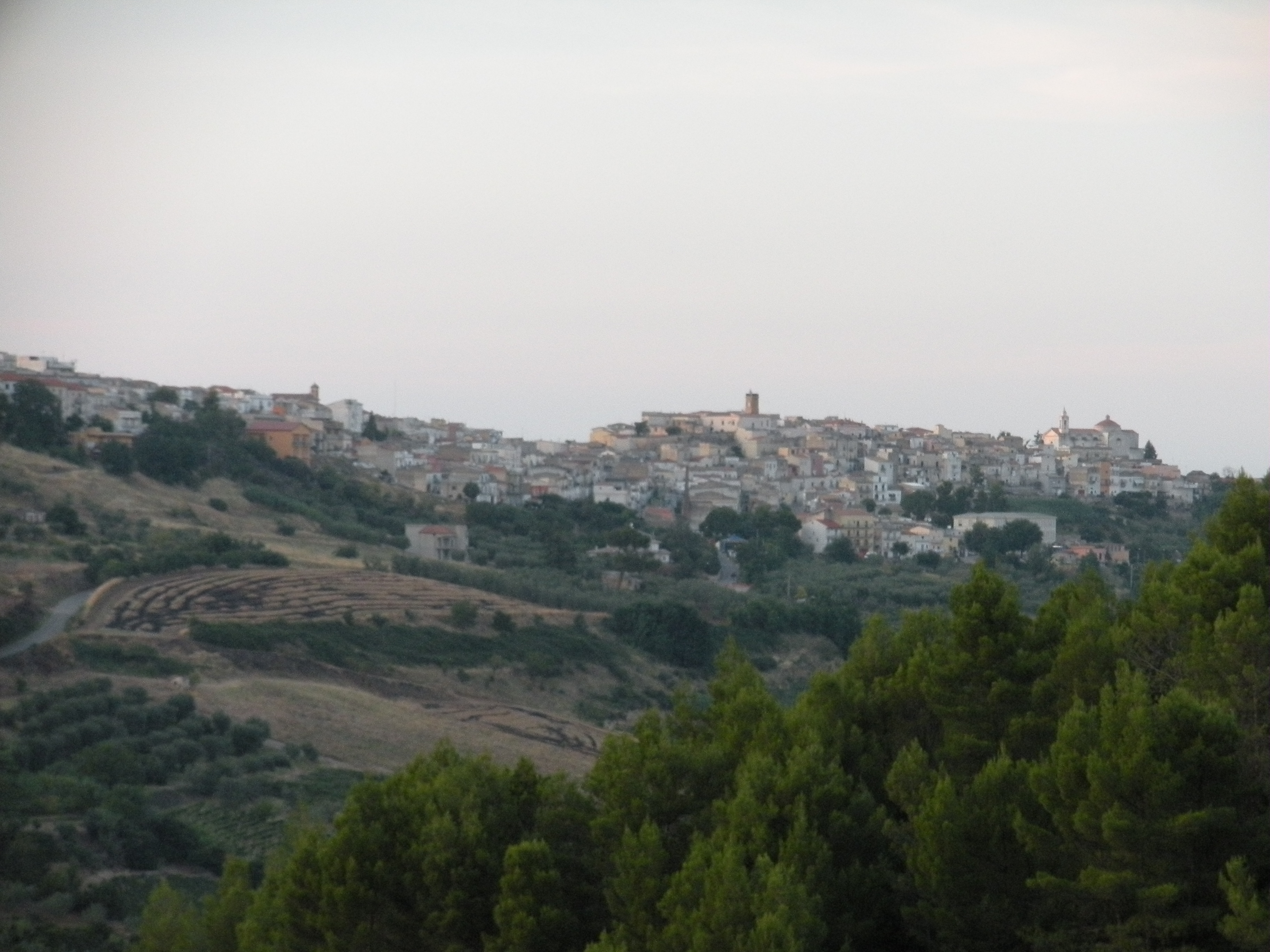
- View of Montemilone

- Coat of arms

- Location of Montemilone in Italy Montemilone (Basilicata)
- Coordinates: 41°02′00″N 15°58′00″E
- Country: Italy
- Region: Basilicata
- Province: Potenza (PZ)

Government
  - Mayor: Antonio D'Amelio

Area
  - Total: 113 km^{2} (44 sq mi)
- Elevation: 310 m (1,020 ft)

Population (31 December 2023)
  - Total: 1,372
  - Density: 12.1/km^{2} (31.4/sq mi)
- Demonym: Montemilonesi
- Time zone: UTC+1 (CET)
  - Summer (DST): UTC+2 (CEST)
- Postal code: 85020
- Dialing code: 0972
- ISTAT code: 076051
- Patron saint: St. Stephen, Glorious Mary of the Wood
- Saint day: 26 December; 11, 12,13 August
- Website: Official website

Montemilone (Italian: ˈmonteˈmilone; Lucano: Mundemelòne) is a town and comune in the province of Potenza, Basilicata, southern Italy.
