= Carbone, Basilicata =

Carbone
- Comune
- Comune di Carbone
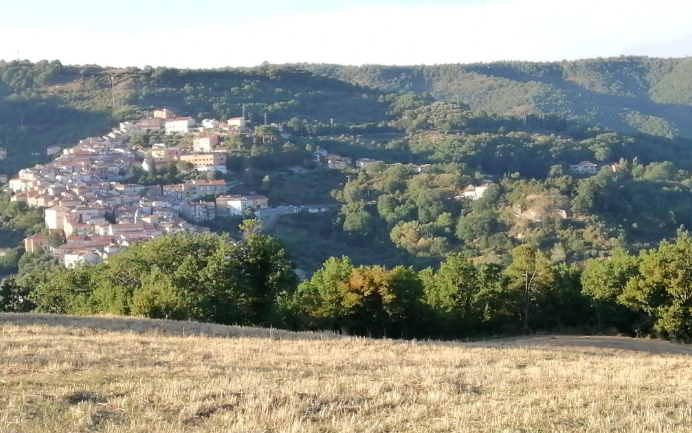
- View of Carbone, Basilicata

- Coat of arms

- Location within Italy Location within Basilicata
- Coordinates: 40°8′N 16°5′E
- Country: Italy
- Region: Basilicata
- Province: Potenza (PZ)

Government
  - Mayor: Mariano Mastropietro (Lista civica Radici future) dal 4-10-2021

Area
  - Total: 48.53 km^{2} (18.74 sq mi)
- Elevation: 690 m (2,260 ft)

Population (December 2008)
  - Total: 744
  - Density: 15.3/km^{2} (39.7/sq mi)
- Demonym: Carbonesi
- Time zone: UTC+1 (CET)
  - Summer (DST): UTC+2 (CEST)
- Postal code: 85030
- Dialing code: 0973
- ISTAT code: 076019
- Website: Official website

Carbone (Lucano: Carvùnë) is a town and comune in the province of Potenza, in the Southern Italian region of Basilicata.
