= Abriola =

- Comune
- Comune di Abriola
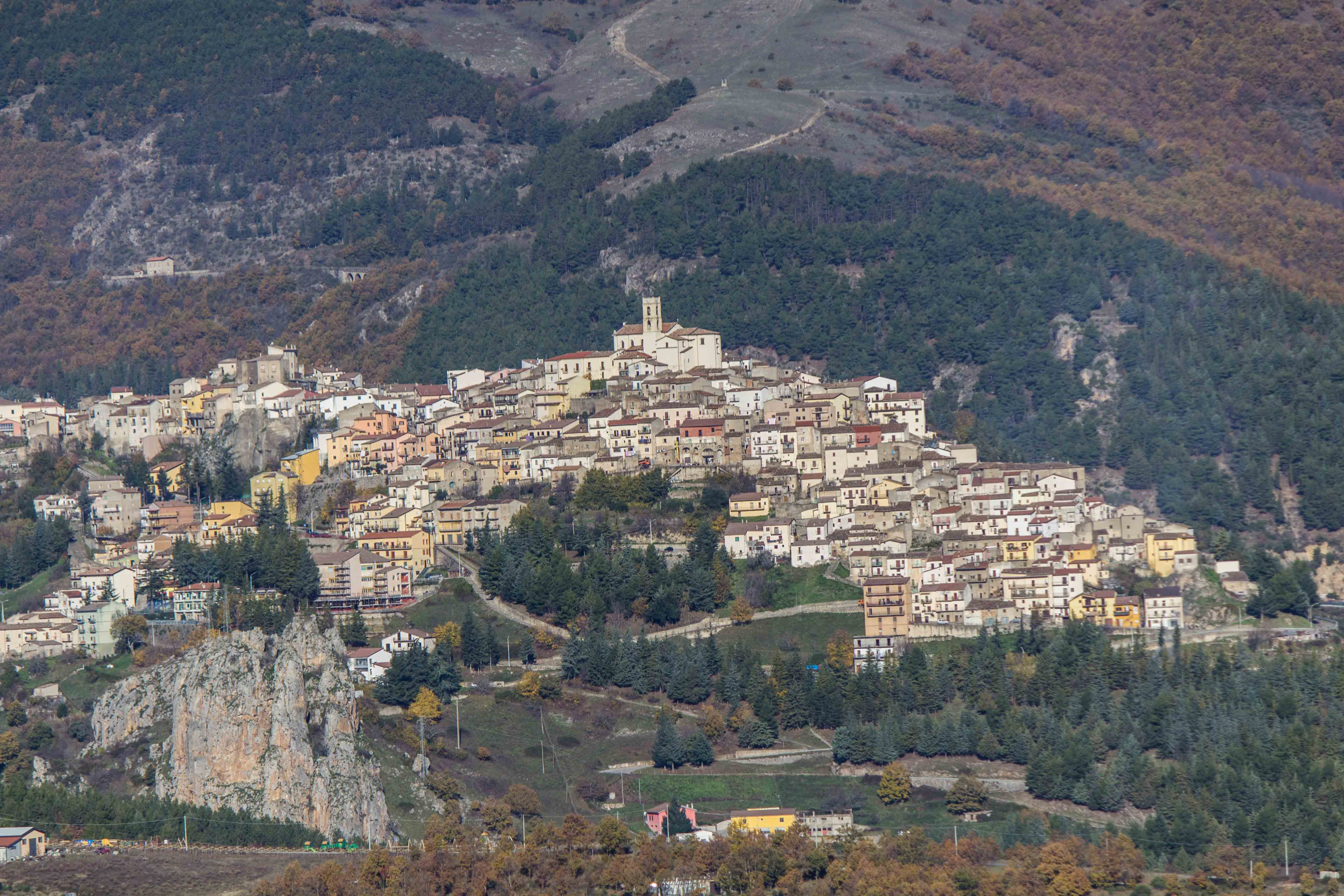
- View of Abriola

- Location of Abriola in Italy Abriola (Basilicata)
- Coordinates: 40°31′N 15°49′E
- Country: Italy
- Region: Basilicata
- Province: Potenza (PZ)

Government
  - Mayor: Antonio Pessolani

Area
  - Total: 96 km^{2} (37 sq mi)
- Elevation: 957 m (3,140 ft)

Population (1 March 2010)
  - Total: 1,617
  - Density: 17/km^{2} (44/sq mi)
- Demonym: Abriolani
- Time zone: UTC+1 (CET)
  - Summer (DST): UTC+2 (CEST)
- Postal code: 85010
- Dialing code: 0971
- ISTAT code: 076001
- Website: Official website

Abriola is a town and comune in the province of Potenza, in the Southern Italian region of Basilicata. It is bounded by the comuni of Anzi, Calvello, Marsico Nuovo, Pignola, Sasso di Castalda, Tito.
