= Roccanova =

- Comune
- Comune di Roccanova
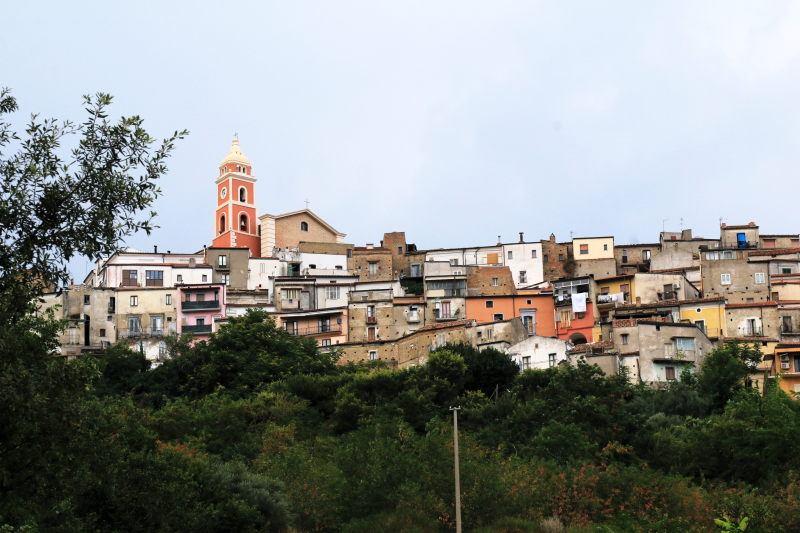
- View of Roccanova

- Coat of arms

- Location within Italy Location within Basilicata
- Coordinates: 40°13′N 16°12′E
- Country: Italy
- Region: Basilicata
- Province: Potenza (PZ)

Government
  - Mayor: Rocco Greco

Area
  - Total: 61.74 km^{2} (23.84 sq mi)
- Elevation: 648 m (2,126 ft)

Population (June 2009)
  - Total: 1,664
  - Density: 26.95/km^{2} (69.80/sq mi)
- Demonym: Roccanovesi
- Time zone: UTC+1 (CET)
  - Summer (DST): UTC+2 (CEST)
- Postal code: 85036
- Dialing code: 0973
- ISTAT code: 076069
- Website: Official website

Roccanova is a town and comune in the province of Potenza, in the southern Italian region of Basilicata.
