= Genzano di Lucania =

- Comune
- Comune di Genzano di Lucania
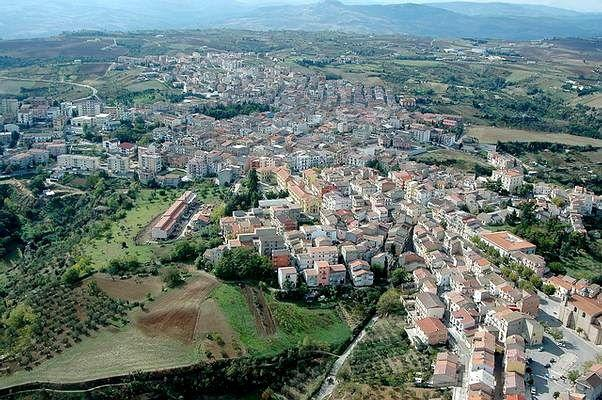
- View of Genzano di Lucania

- Location within Italy Location within Basilicata
- Coordinates: 40°51′N 16°02′E
- Country: Italy
- Region: Basilicata
- Province: Potenza (PZ)

Government
  - Mayor: Viviana Cervellino

Area
  - Total: 208.93 km^{2} (80.67 sq mi)
- Elevation: 587 m (1,926 ft)

Population (31 August 2017)
  - Total: 5,691
  - Density: 27.24/km^{2} (70.55/sq mi)
- Demonym: Genzanesi
- Time zone: UTC+1 (CET)
  - Summer (DST): UTC+2 (CEST)
- Postal code: 85013
- Dialing code: 0971
- ISTAT code: 076036
- Website: Official website

Genzano di Lucania (Genzanese: Ienzàne) is a town and comune in the province of Potenza, Basilicata, southern Italy.
