= Castelluccio Inferiore =

- Comune
- Comune di Castelluccio Inferiore
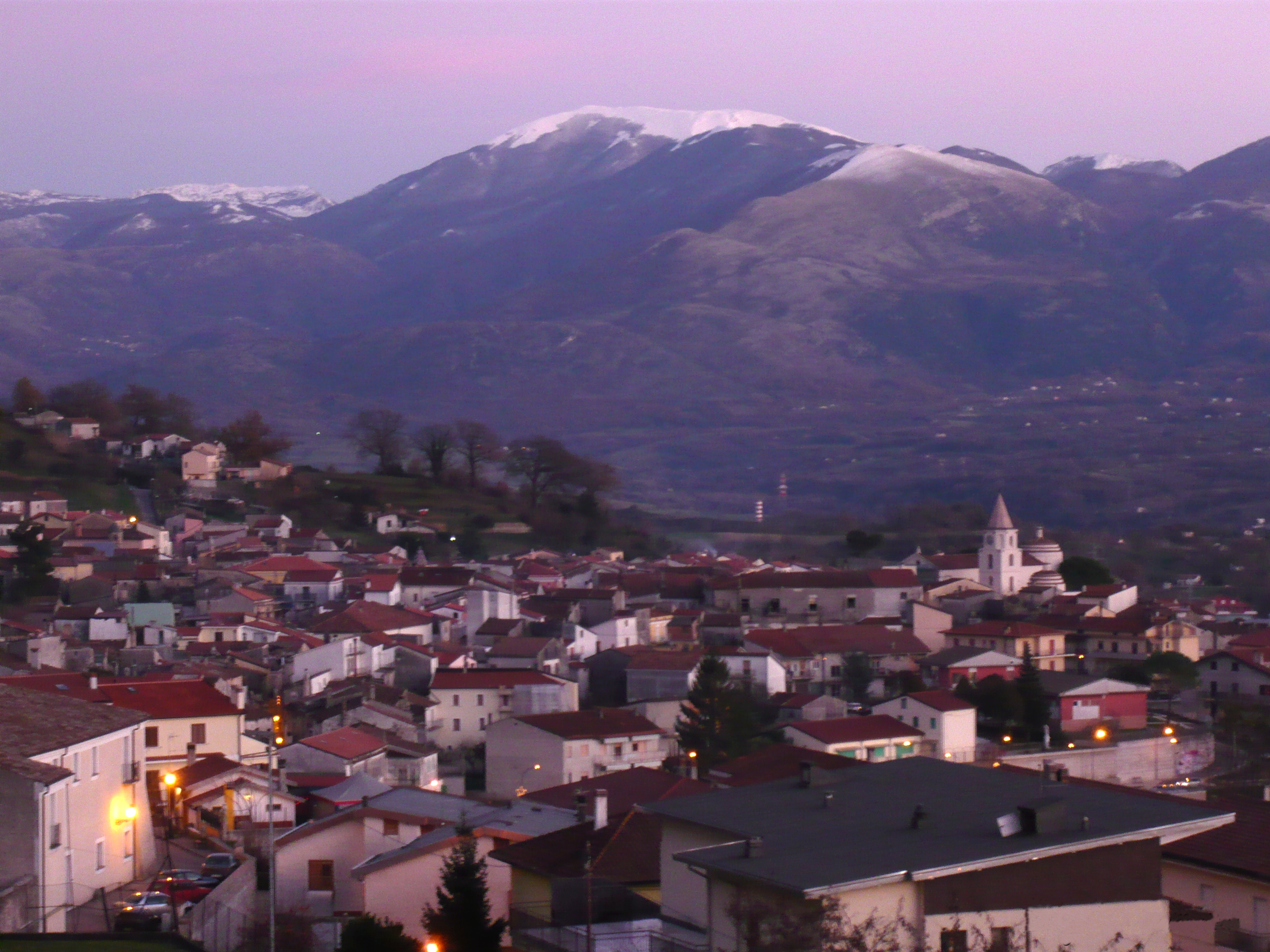
- View of Castelluccio Inferiore

- Coat of arms

- Location within Italy Location within Basilicata
- Coordinates: 40°00′N 15°58′E
- Country: Italy
- Region: Basilicata
- Province: Potenza (PZ)

Government
  - Mayor: Paolo Francesco Campanella

Area
  - Total: 28.96 km^{2} (11.18 sq mi)
- Elevation: 495 m (1,624 ft)

Population (January 1, 2018)
  - Total: 2,383
  - Density: 82.29/km^{2} (213.1/sq mi)
- Demonym: Castelluccesi
- Time zone: UTC+1 (CET)
  - Summer (DST): UTC+2 (CEST)
- Postal code: 85040
- Dialing code: 0973
- ISTAT code: 076022
- Website: Official website

Castelluccio Inferiore (Lucano: Castëllùccë) is a town and comune in the province of Potenza, in the Southern Italian region of Basilicata.
