= Terranova di Pollino =

- Comune
- Comune di Terranova di Pollino
- Coat of arms

- Location within Italy Location within Basilicata
- Coordinates: 39°59′N 16°18′E
- Country: Italy
- Region: Basilicata
- Province: Potenza (PZ)
- Frazioni: Casa Del Conte, Destra Delle Donne, San Migalio, Vena Della Ricotta

Government
  - Mayor: Francesco Santa Ciancia

Area
  - Total: 113.07 km^{2} (43.66 sq mi)
- Elevation: 926 m (3,038 ft)

Population (31 October 2018)
  - Total: 1,129
  - Density: 9.985/km^{2} (25.86/sq mi)
- Demonym: Terranovesi
- Time zone: UTC+1 (CET)
  - Summer (DST): UTC+2 (CEST)
- Postal code: 85030
- Dialing code: 0973
- ISTAT code: 076088
- Patron saint: St. Anthony of Padua
- Saint day: June 13
- Website: Official website

Terranova di Pollino is a town and comune in the province of Potenza, in the Basilicata region of Italy. The town is located in the Pollino National Park.
