= San Severino Lucano =

- Comune
- Comune di San Severino Lucano
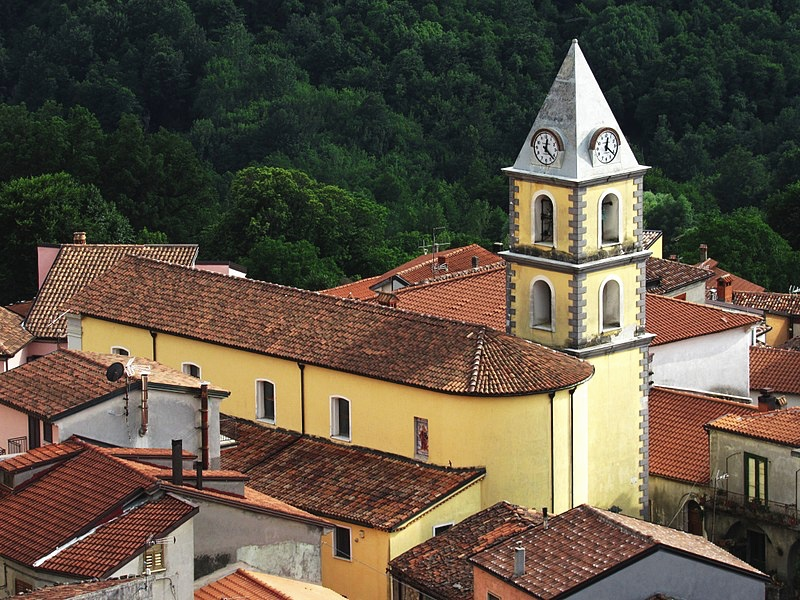
- View of San Severino Lucano

- Location within Italy Location within Basilicata
- Coordinates: 40°1′N 16°8′E
- Country: Italy
- Region: Basilicata
- Province: Potenza (PZ)
- Frazioni: Mezzana, Cropani, Mancini, Villaneto

Area
  - Total: 61 km^{2} (24 sq mi)
- Elevation: 877 m (2,877 ft)

Population (December 2008)
  - Total: 1,763
  - Density: 29/km^{2} (75/sq mi)
- Demonym: Sanseverinesi
- Time zone: UTC+1 (CET)
  - Summer (DST): UTC+2 (CEST)
- Postal code: 85030
- Dialing code: 0973
- ISTAT code: 076078
- Patron saint: San Vincenzo
- Saint day: 2 August
- Website: Official website

San Severino Lucano is a town and comune in the province of Potenza, in the Southern Italian region of Basilicata.
