= Pignola =

- Comune
- Comune di Pignola
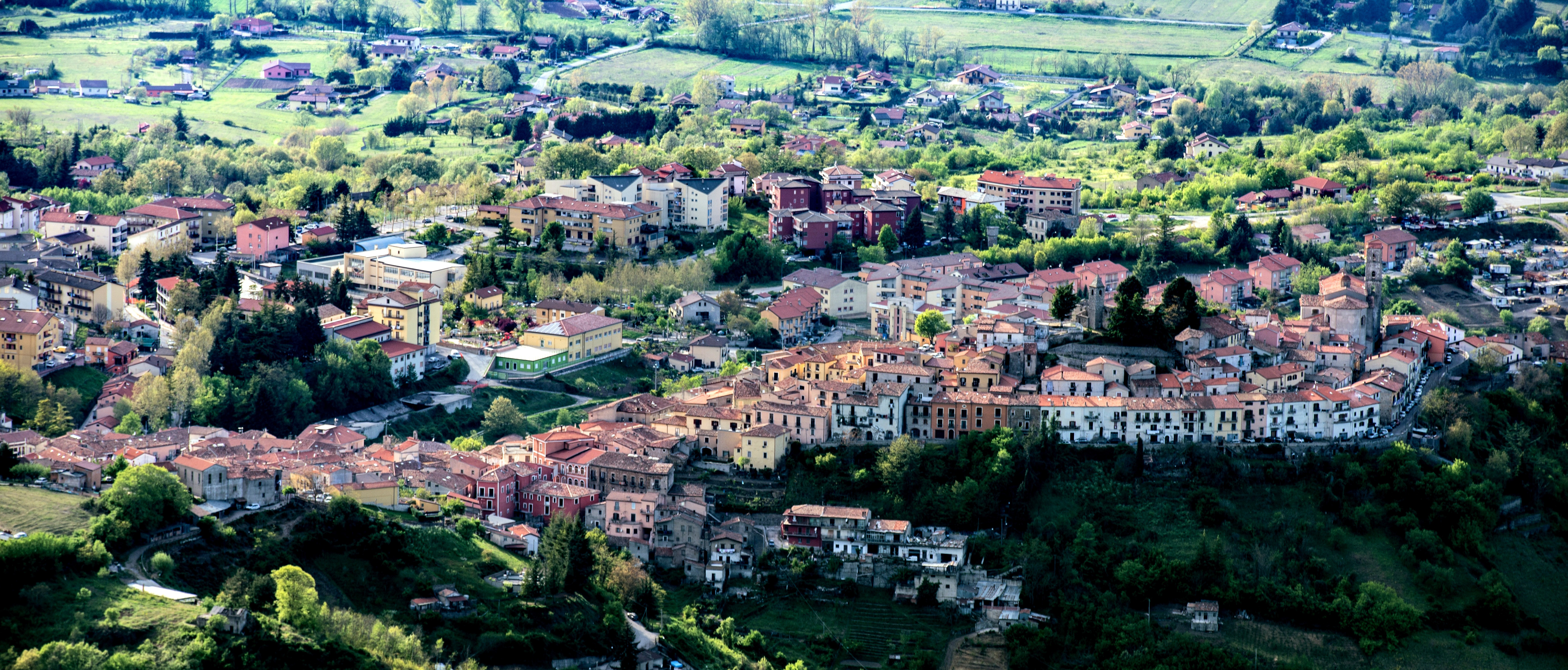
- View of Pignola

- Location within Italy Location within Basilicata
- Coordinates: 40°34′N 15°47′E
- Country: Italy
- Region: Basilicata
- Province: Potenza (PZ)
- Frazioni: Arioso, Pantano-Petrucco, Rifreddo

Government
  - Mayor: Gerardo Ferretti

Area
  - Total: 55 km^{2} (21 sq mi)
- Elevation: 926 m (3,038 ft)

Population (October 2008)
  - Total: 3
  - Density: 0.055/km^{2} (0.14/sq mi)
- Demonym: 7000
- Time zone: UTC+1 (CET)
  - Summer (DST): UTC+2 (CEST)
- Postal code: 85010
- Dialing code: 0971
- ISTAT code: 076062
- Patron saint: Madonna degli Angeli
- Website: Official website

Pignola is an Italian town in the province of Potenza in Basilicata. It borders to the east with Anzi, to the south-west with Abriola, to the west with Tito and to the north with Potenza. The Pignolese territory extends for 55.51 km^{2} and has an altitude ranging from 700 m of Pantano-Petrucco to 927 m of the inhabited center, up to 1476 m of Mount Serranetta which represents the highest point of the Pignolese territory. It has 6,962 inhabitants.

The municipality includes fourteen hamlets: Masseria Coviello, Campo di Giorgio, Molino di Capo, Mulino di Piede, Pantano, Petrucco, Piancardillo, Ponte Mallardo, Pozzillo, Rifreddo, Sciffra, Serra San Marco, Tora, Tuorno, and is divided into two parts: the historic center upstream, and the Pantano, near the lake of the same name and the WWF oasis. The area is of high seismic hazard. The area is mainly wooded and there are numerous streams that feed the Basento; there are also numerous drinking springs but not noteworthy for the small amount of water. A few steps from the hamlet of Pantano at 770 m above sea level, there is a lake, Lake Pantano di Pignola, protected by a nature reserve and originating from an ancient swamp reclaimed in the first half of the twentieth century.
