= Calvello =

- Comune
- Comune di Calvello
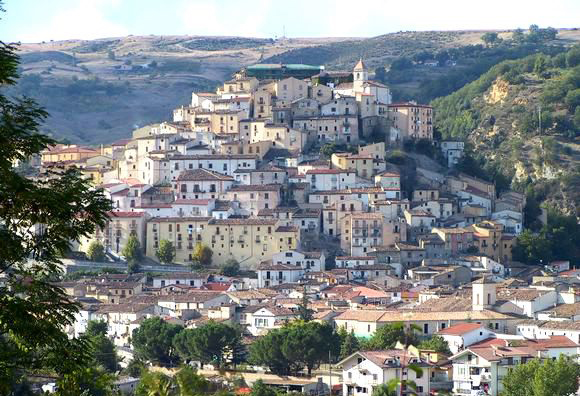
- View of Calvello

- Location within Italy Location within Basilicata
- Coordinates: 40°29′N 15°51′E
- Country: Italy
- Region: Basilicata
- Province: Potenza (PZ)

Government
  - Mayor: Anna Cantisani

Area
  - Total: 106.4 km^{2} (41.1 sq mi)
- Elevation: 730 m (2,400 ft)

Population (1996)
  - Total: 2,231
  - Density: 20.97/km^{2} (54.31/sq mi)
- Demonym: Calvellesi
- Time zone: UTC+1 (CET)
  - Summer (DST): UTC+2 (CEST)
- Postal code: 85010
- Dialing code: 0971
- ISTAT code: 076015
- Patron saint: Saint Nicholas
- Saint day: December 6
- Website: Official website

Calvello (Lucano: Calvìedde) is a town and comune in the province of Potenza, in the Southern Italian region of Basilicata, known for its traditional production of artistic ceramics. It is bounded by the towns of Abriola, Anzi, Laurenzana, Marsico Nuovo, Marsicovetere, Viggiano.

== Main sights ==
- Castle, known from as early as the Norman period (11th century). It was held, among others, by the Carafa and Sanseverino families.
- Church and convent of Santa Maria de Piano
- The Sant'Antuono bridge is an arc-shaped stone structure. It is named after the little Church built by the inhabitants of the river dedicated to St. Anthony the Great, commonly known as St. Antuono. This construction was carried out at the beginning of 1200, by local craftsmen under the technical direction of Benedictine monks, skilled engineers, pontiffs and architects. The bridge had the purpose of facilitating safe exchange between the residents of Plan and those of the Sant'Antuono district, which in earlier times were accessed with uncertain and shaky walkways. The bridge was built on the river "La Terra", a stream of continuous flow; Calvello is one of the few towns in the region bathed in a watercourse of this kind. The bridge had not undergone any alterations due to weather and natural events until the early twentieth century, so that today the condition of the bridge is good, even though the interventions subsequently affected the beauty of the work as a whole.
