= Trecchina =

- Comune
- Comune di Trecchina
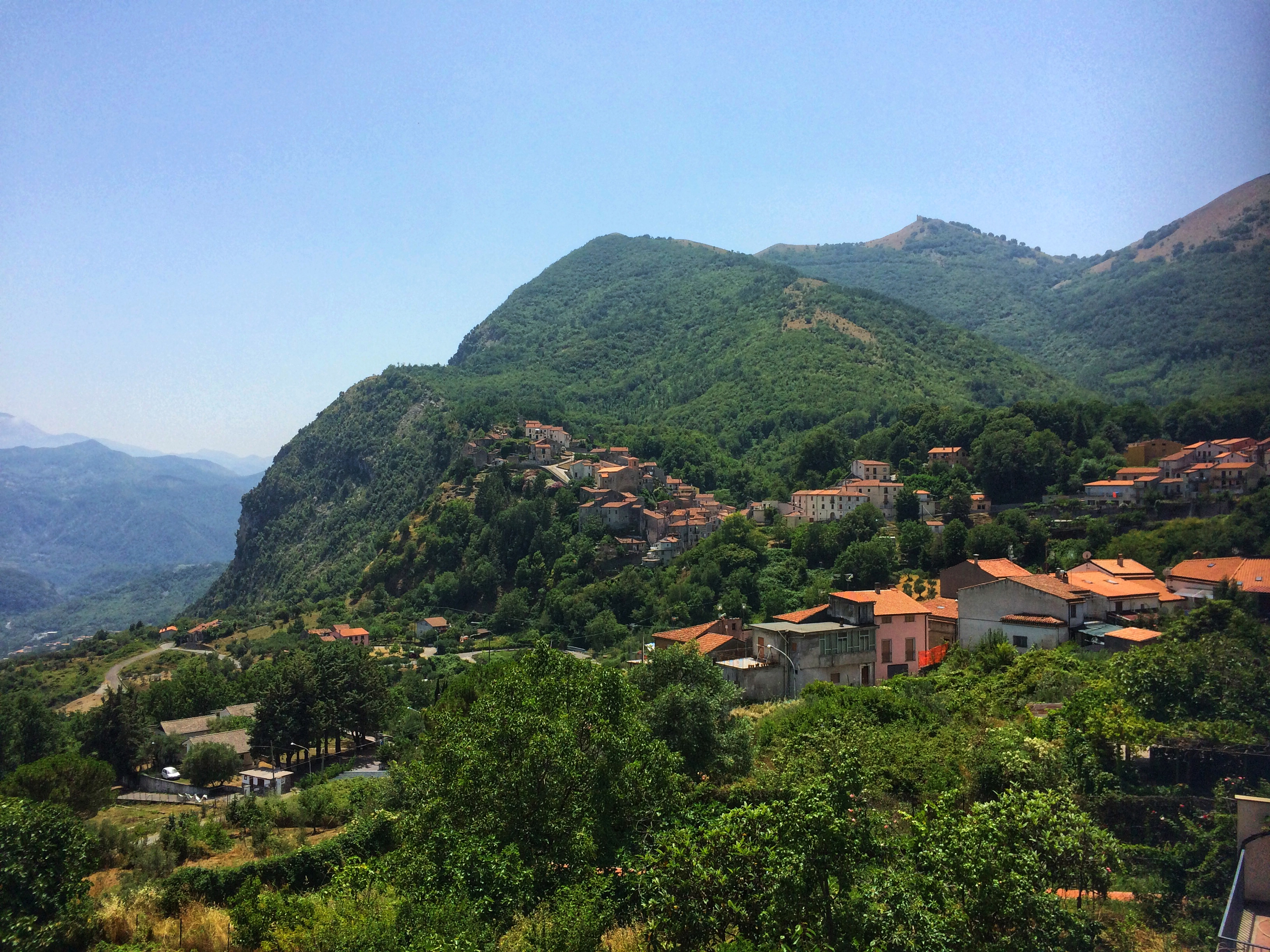
- View of Trecchina

- Location within Italy Location within Basilicata
- Coordinates: 40°2′N 15°46′E
- Country: Italy
- Region: Basilicata
- Province: Potenza (PZ)
- Frazioni: Bolago, Camporotondo, Colla, Foresta, Maurino, Parrutta, Piano dei Peri, Ronzino, Santiquaranta

Government
  - Mayor: Ludovico Iannotti

Area
  - Total: 38.19 km^{2} (14.75 sq mi)
- Elevation: 500 m (1,600 ft)

Population (31 August 2018)
  - Total: 2,275
  - Density: 59.57/km^{2} (154.3/sq mi)
- Demonym: Trecchinèsi
- Time zone: UTC+1 (CET)
  - Summer (DST): UTC+2 (CEST)
- Postal code: 85049
- Dialing code: 0973
- ISTAT code: 076092
- Patron saint: San Michele Arcangelo
- Saint day: 29 September
- Website: Official website

Trecchina (['trekkina]) is a town and comune in the province of Potenza, in the Southern Italian region of Basilicata.
