= Fardella, Basilicata =

Fardella
- Comune
- Comune di Fardella
- Location within Italy Location within Basilicata
- Coordinates: 40°7′N 16°10′E
- Country: Italy
- Region: Basilicata
- Province: Potenza (PZ)

Government
  - Mayor: Domenica Orfino

Area
  - Total: 29.08 km^{2} (11.23 sq mi)
- Elevation: 745 m (2,444 ft)

Population (2001)
  - Total: 765
  - Density: 26.3/km^{2} (68.1/sq mi)
- Demonym: Fardellesi
- Time zone: UTC+1 (CET)
  - Summer (DST): UTC+2 (CEST)
- Postal code: 85030
- Dialing code: 0973
- ISTAT code: 076031
- Patron saint: Saint Anthony of Padua and Madonna del Rosario
- Website: Official website

Fardella is a town and comune of 598 residents, in the province of Potenza, in the southern Italian region of Basilicata.
