= Sasso di Castalda =

- Comune
- Comune di Sasso di Castalda
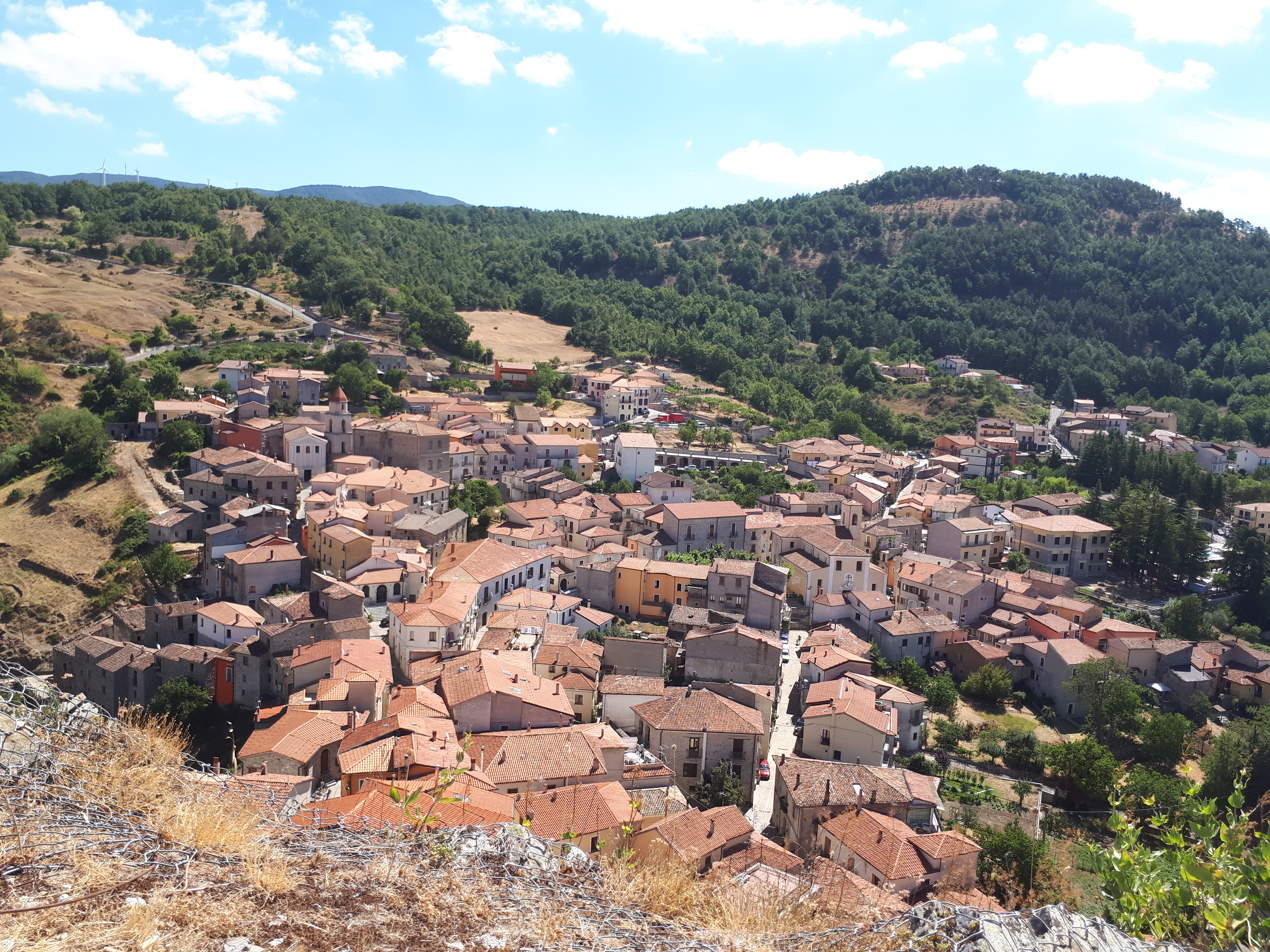
- View of Sasso di Castalda

- Coat of arms

- Location within Italy Location within Basilicata
- Coordinates: 40°29′N 15°41′E
- Country: Italy
- Region: Basilicata
- Province: Potenza (PZ)

Government
  - Mayor: Rocchino Nardo

Area
  - Total: 45.45 km^{2} (17.55 sq mi)
- Elevation: 949 m (3,114 ft)

Population (31 December 2009)
  - Total: 853
  - Density: 18.8/km^{2} (48.6/sq mi)
- Demonym: Sassesi
- Time zone: UTC+1 (CET)
  - Summer (DST): UTC+2 (CEST)
- Postal code: 85050
- Dialing code: 0975
- ISTAT code: 076082
- Patron saint: Saint Roch
- Saint day: 16 August
- Website: Official website

Sasso di Castalda (Lucano: U Sàsse) is a town and comune within the province of Potenza, in the region of Basilicata, Italy.
