= San Chirico Raparo =

- Comune
- Comune di San Chirico Raparo
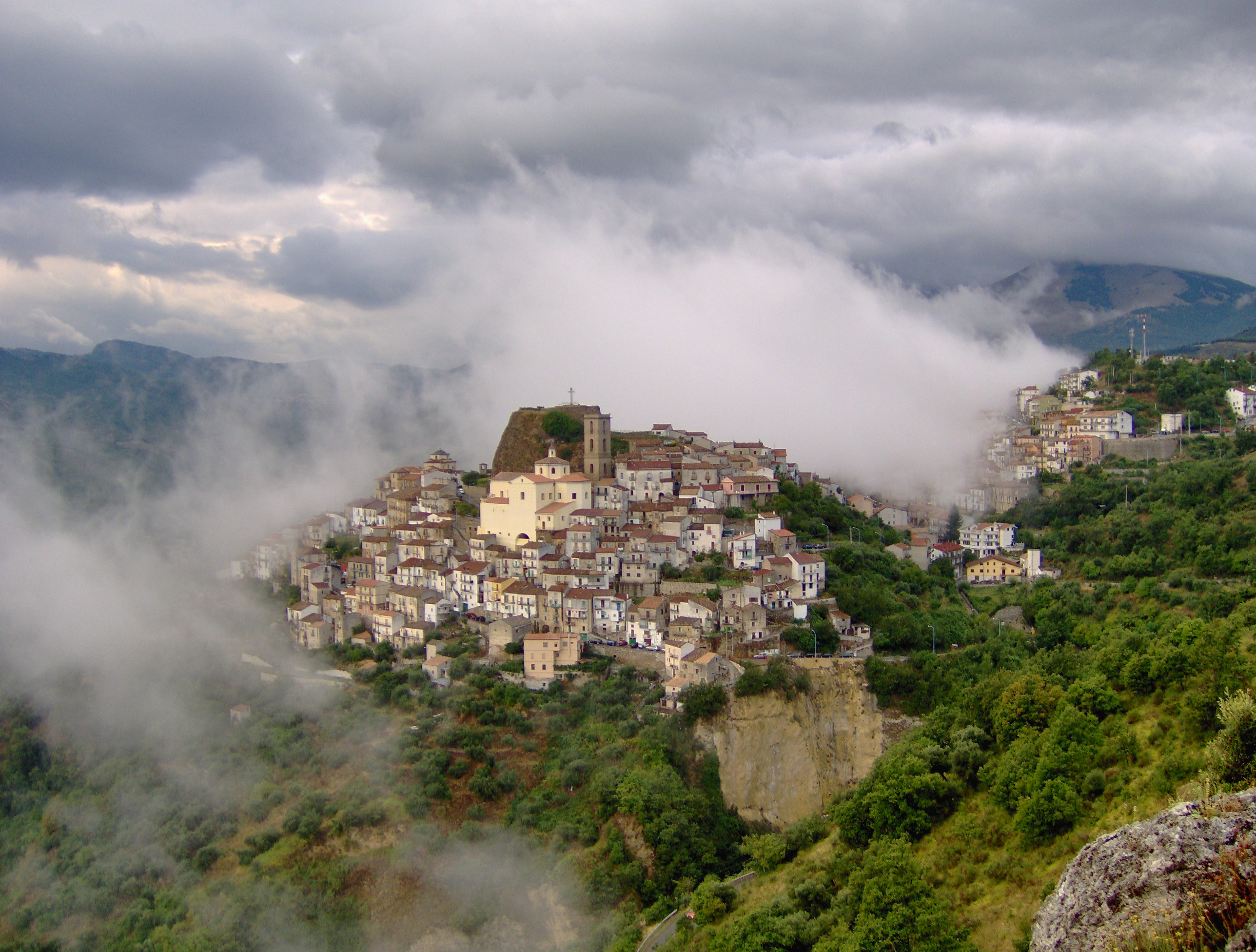
- View of San Chirico Raparo

- Location within Italy Location within Basilicata
- Coordinates: 40°11′N 16°5′E
- Country: Italy
- Region: Basilicata
- Province: Potenza (PZ)

Government
  - Mayor: Claudio Borneo

Area
  - Total: 82 km^{2} (32 sq mi)
- Elevation: 780 m (2,560 ft)

Population (May 2008)
  - Total: 1,219
  - Density: 15/km^{2} (39/sq mi)
- Demonym: Sanchirichesi
- Time zone: UTC+1 (CET)
  - Summer (DST): UTC+2 (CEST)
- Postal code: 85030
- Dialing code: 0973
- ISTAT code: 076074
- Patron saint: St. Chirico, Santa Sinforosa
- Saint day: 15 and 18 July
- Website: Official website

San Chirico Raparo is a town and comune in the province of Potenza, in the Southern Italian region of Basilicata.
