= Castelluccio Superiore =

- Comune
- Comune di Castelluccio Superiore
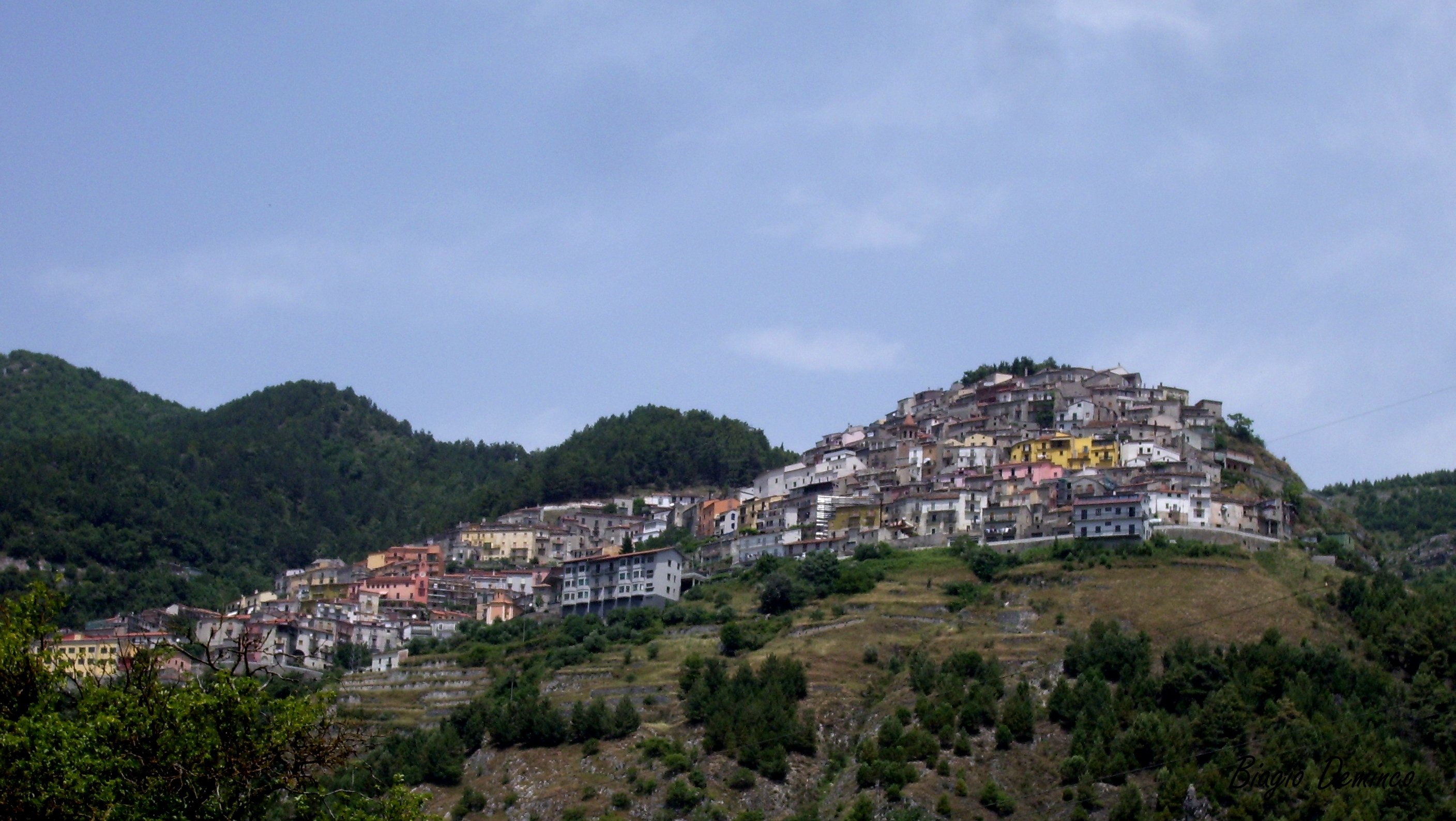
- View of Castelluccio Superiore

- Coat of arms

- Location within Italy Location within Basilicata
- Coordinates: 40°01′N 15°59′E
- Country: Italy
- Region: Basilicata
- Province: Potenza (PZ)

Government
  - Mayor: Giovanni Ruggiero (since 2019)

Area
  - Total: 32.98 km^{2} (12.73 sq mi)
- Elevation: 680 m (2,230 ft)

Population (1 January 2018)
  - Total: 702
  - Density: 21.3/km^{2} (55.1/sq mi)
- Demonym: Castelluccesi
- Time zone: UTC+1 (CET)
  - Summer (DST): UTC+2 (CEST)
- Postal code: 85040
- Dialing code: 0973
- ISTAT code: 076023
- Website: Official website

Castelluccio Superiore (Castelluccese: Castellùcce) is a town and comune in the province of Potenza, in the Southern Italian region of Basilicata.

== Twin towns – sister cities ==
- Iúna, Brazil, since 2007
