= San Martino d'Agri =

- Comune
- Comune di San Martino d'Agri
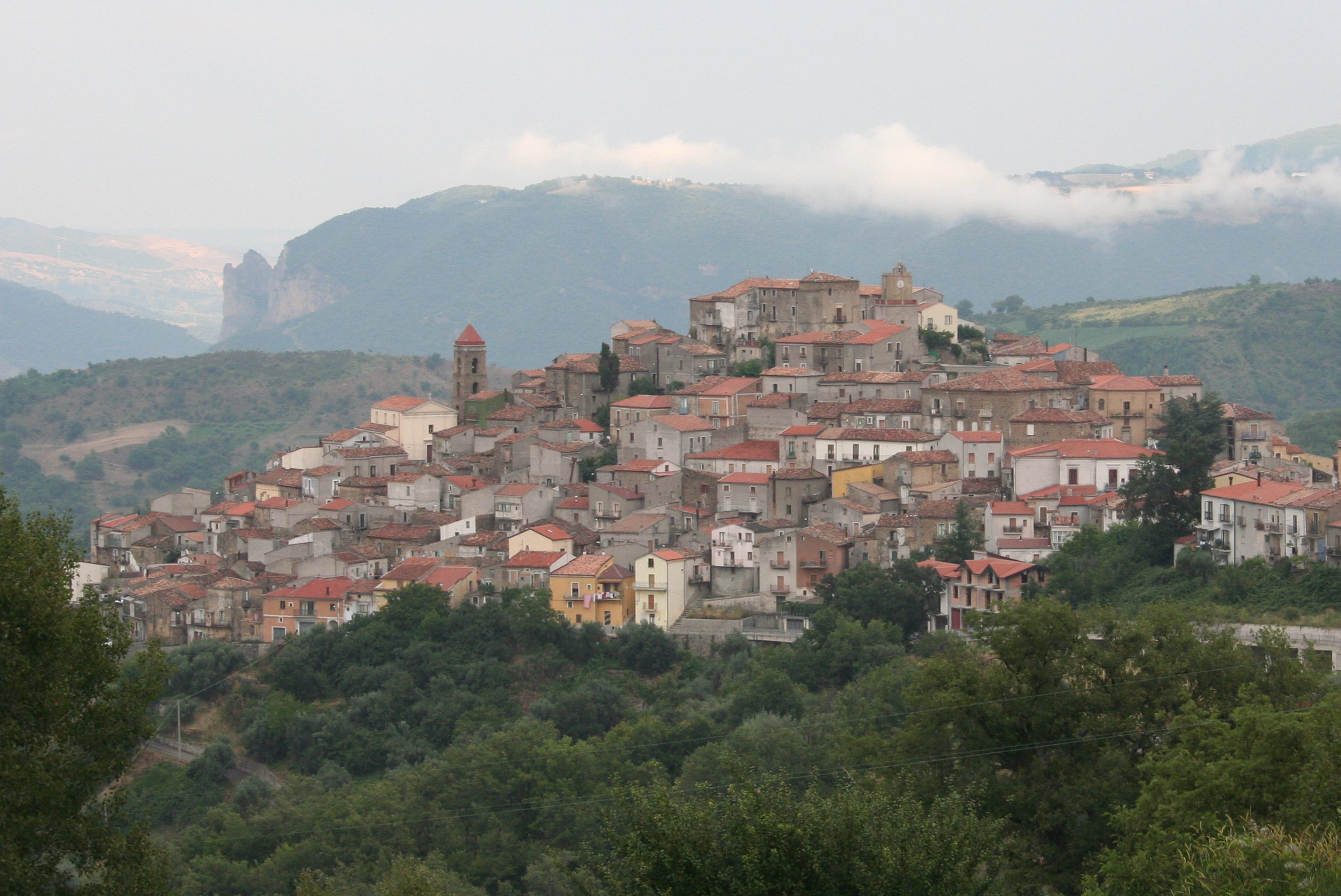
- View of San Martino d'Agri

- Location within Italy Location within Basilicata
- Coordinates: 40°14′N 16°3′E
- Country: Italy
- Region: Basilicata
- Province: Potenza (PZ)
- Frazioni: San Pietro

Government
  - Mayor: Mario Antonio Imperatrice

Area
  - Total: 50 km^{2} (19 sq mi)
- Elevation: 666 m (2,185 ft)

Population (2007)
  - Total: 889
  - Density: 18/km^{2} (46/sq mi)
- Demonym: Sanmartinesi
- Time zone: UTC+1 (CET)
  - Summer (DST): UTC+2 (CEST)
- Postal code: 85030
- Dialing code: 0973
- ISTAT code: 076077
- Website: Official website

San Martino d'Agri is a hill town and comune in the province of Potenza, in the Southern Italian region of Basilicata. It is a town of less than 800 people most of the year, but in August the population swells to around 2,000 when Sammartinesi return for the Festa della Madonna della Rupe, some coming from as far as North America, South America and Australia. San Martino d'Agri is on the peak of a hill at 666 meters above sea level. At one point in the town's history, there was a major mudslide (frana) that wiped out most of the town; however, it recovered. Atop the hill stands a medieval castle, which was first owned by the barone. However, after the barone was overthrown, there was an earthquake that destroyed much of the town. The castle was later renovated and divided up into sections for different families' housing. In the late mid-1900s, a section was abandoned and wasn't renovated until 2003. That part, as well as another is currently owned and still being renovated.
