= Montemurro =

- Comune
- Comune di Montemurro
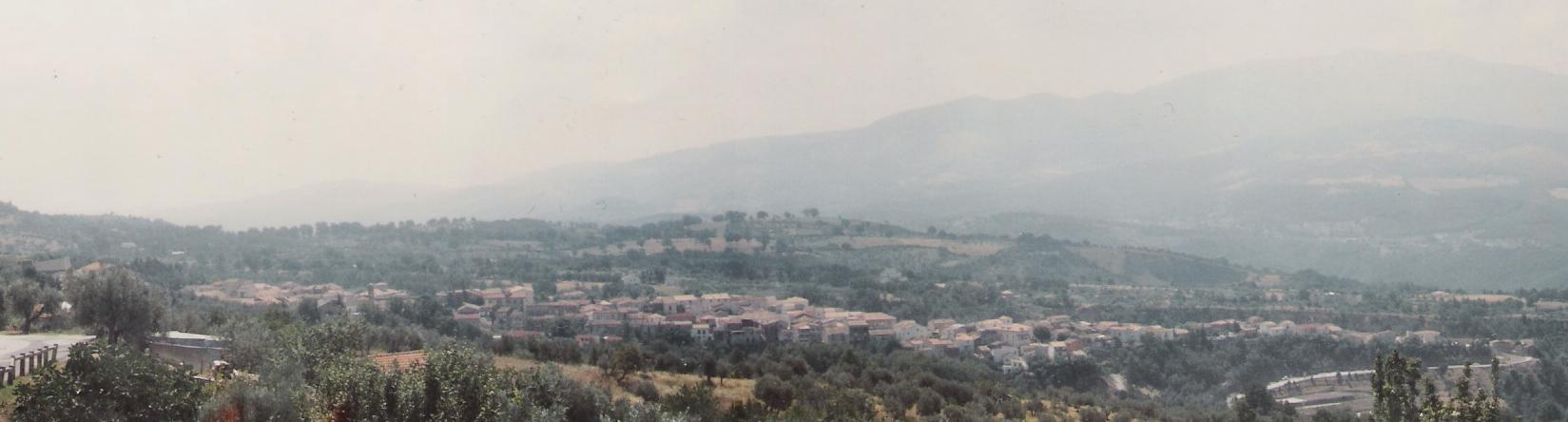
- View of Montemurro

- Coat of arms

- Location within Italy Location within Basilicata
- Coordinates: 40°18′N 15°59′E
- Country: Italy
- Region: Basilicata
- Province: Potenza (PZ)
- Frazioni: Le Piane

Area
  - Total: 56.54 km^{2} (21.83 sq mi)
- Elevation: 723 m (2,372 ft)

Population (30 March 2008)
  - Total: 1,428
  - Density: 25.26/km^{2} (65.41/sq mi)
- Demonym: Montemurresi (Local dialect: munt'murris')
- Time zone: UTC+1 (CET)
  - Summer (DST): UTC+2 (CEST)
- Postal code: 85053
- Dialing code: 0971
- ISTAT code: 076052
- Patron saint: St. George and St. Maurice
- Saint day: 23 April (St. George) and 16–18 August (St. Roch)
- Website: Official website

Montemurro is a town and comune in the province of Potenza, in the Southern Italian region of Basilicata.
