= Castelsaraceno =

- Comune
- Comune di Castelsaraceno
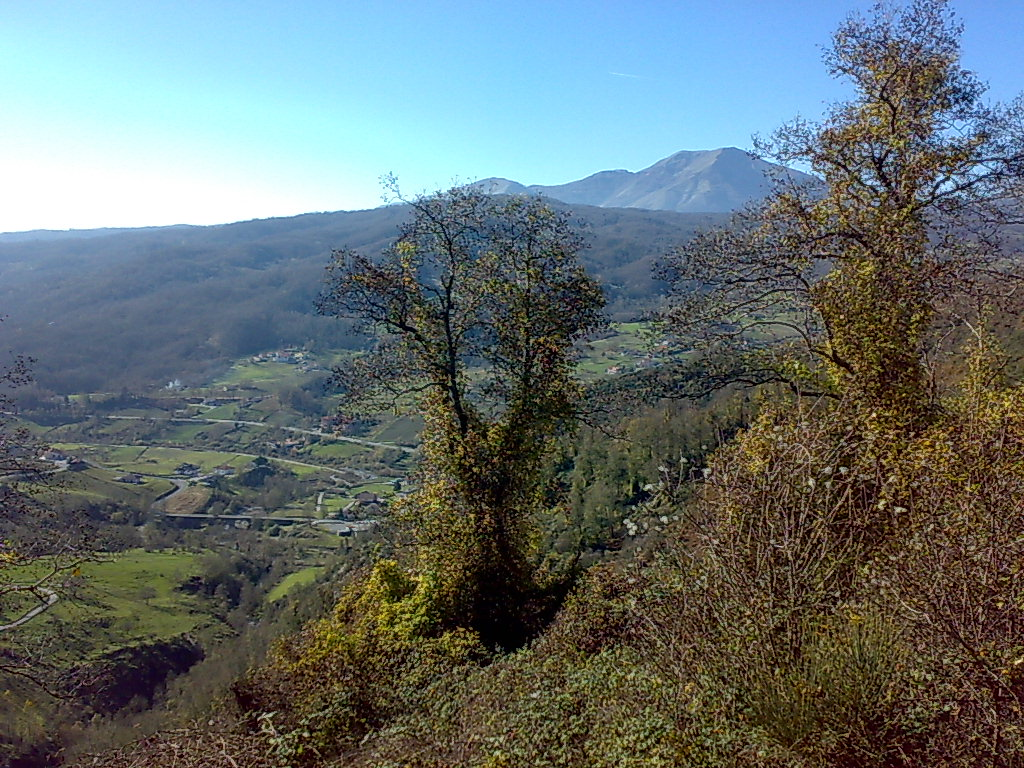
- A view in its rural territory

- Coat of arms

- Location of Castelsaraceno in Italy Castelsaraceno (Basilicata)
- Coordinates: 40°10′N 15°59′E
- Country: Italy
- Region: Basilicata
- Province: Potenza (PZ)
- Frazioni: Bruscati, Frusci, Miraldo, Pié d'Alpi

Government
  - Mayor: Rocco Rosano

Area
  - Total: 74.78 km^{2} (28.87 sq mi)
- Elevation: 960 m (3,150 ft)

Population (2007)
  - Total: 1,584
  - Density: 21.18/km^{2} (54.86/sq mi)
- Demonym: Castellani
- Time zone: UTC+1 (CET)
  - Summer (DST): UTC+2 (CEST)
- Postal code: 85031
- Dialing code: 0973
- ISTAT code: 076025
- Patron saint: St. Anthony of Padua
- Saint day: 13 June
- Website: Official website

Castelsaraceno (Lucano: Castìeddë) is a town and comune in the province of Potenza, in the Southern Italian region of Basilicata.

Nearby the commune is one of the longest footbridges, with length of 586m - Ponte tibetano di Castelsaraceno.
