= Province of Potenza =

Province of Italy

Province of Potenza Provincia di Potenza (Italian) Provìgnë dë Pùtenzë (Neapolitan)
- Province
- Provincial seat in Potenza

- Flag Seal

- Location of the province of Potenza in Italy
- Coordinates: 40°38′19″N 15°48′8″E
- Country: Italy
- Region: Basilicata
- Capital(s): Potenza
- Municipalities: 100

Government
  - President: Christian Giordano

Area
  - Total: 6,594.44 km^{2} (2,546.13 sq mi)

Population (2026)
  - Total: 337,527
  - Density: 51.1836/km^{2} (132.565/sq mi)

GDP
  - Total: €8.585 billion (2015)
  - Per capita: €22,942 (2015)
- Time zone: UTC+1 (CET)
  - Summer (DST): UTC+2 (CEST)
- Postal code: 85010-85018, 85020-85040, 85042-85044, 85046-85059
- Telephone prefix: 0971, 0972, 0973, 0975, 0976
- ISO 3166 code: IT-PZ
- Vehicle registration: PZ
- ISTAT code: 076
- Website: Official website

The province of Potenza (Italian: provincia di Potenza; Potentino: provìgnë dë Pùtenzë) is a province in the region of Basilicata in southern Italy. Its capital is the city of Potenza.

It has a population of 337,527 in an area of 6,594 square kilometres (2,546 mi^{2}) across its 100 municipalities.

== History ==
In 272 BC, the province was conquered by the Romans. The new rulers named the region Lucania. In the 11th century, the area became part of the Duchy of Apulia, which was at the time ruled by the Normans. From the 13th century, it was part of the Kingdom of Naples, though Potenza was ruled by local vassals. In 1861, the province was unified with the rest of Italy in the newly formed Kingdom of Italy.

The region has suffered from numerous earthquakes in historic times, and is still a seismically active area.

== Geography ==
The province is characterized by various natural landscapes, ranging from the mountain lakes of Monticchio, the Lucan forest, the Monte Sirino massif, the large National Park of Pollino (shared by Calabria) and the Tyrrhenian coast of Maratea. The largest city is Potenza, followed by Melfi.

== Government ==
=== Municipalities ===
The province has 100 municipalities:

- Abriola
- Acerenza
- Albano di Lucania
- Anzi
- Armento
- Atella
- Avigliano
- Balvano
- Banzi
- Baragiano
- Barile
- Bella
- Brienza
- Brindisi Montagna
- Calvello
- Calvera
- Campomaggiore
- Cancellara
- Carbone
- Castelgrande
- Castelluccio Inferiore
- Castelluccio Superiore
- Castelmezzano
- Castelsaraceno
- Castronuovo di Sant'Andrea
- Cersosimo
- Chiaromonte
- Corleto Perticara
- Episcopia
- Fardella
- Filiano
- Forenza
- Francavilla in Sinni
- Gallicchio
- Genzano di Lucania
- Ginestra
- Grumento Nova
- Guardia Perticara
- Lagonegro
- Latronico
- Laurenzana
- Lauria
- Lavello
- Maratea
- Marsico Nuovo
- Marsicovetere
- Maschito
- Melfi
- Missanello
- Moliterno
- Montemilone
- Montemurro
- Muro Lucano
- Nemoli
- Noepoli
- Oppido Lucano
- Palazzo San Gervasio
- Paterno
- Pescopagano
- Picerno
- Pietragalla
- Pietrapertosa
- Pignola
- Potenza
- Rapolla
- Rapone
- Rionero in Vulture
- Ripacandida
- Rivello
- Roccanova
- Rotonda
- Ruoti
- Ruvo del Monte
- San Chirico Nuovo
- San Chirico Raparo
- San Costantino Albanese
- San Fele
- San Martino d'Agri
- San Paolo Albanese
- San Severino Lucano
- Sant'Angelo Le Fratte
- Sant'Arcangelo
- Sarconi
- Sasso di Castalda
- Satriano di Lucania
- Savoia di Lucania
- Senise
- Spinoso
- Teana
- Terranova di Pollino
- Tito
- Tolve
- Tramutola
- Trecchina
- Trivigno
- Vaglio Basilicata
- Venosa
- Vietri di Potenza
- Viggianello
- Viggiano

== Demographics ==
As of 2026, the population is 337,527, of which 49.5% are male, and 50.5% are female. Minors make up 13.1% of the population, and seniors make up 26.9%.

Historical population

Year	Pop.	±%
1861	395,344	—
1871	407,689	+3.1%
1881	411,266	+0.9%
1901	361,980	−12.0%
1911	355,859	−1.7%
1921	361,495	+1.6%
1931	373,672	+3.4%
1936	393,950	+5.4%

Year	Pop.	±%
1951	445,188	+13.0%
1961	444,166	−0.2%
1971	408,435	−8.0%
1981	406,616	−0.4%
1991	401,543	−1.2%
2001	393,529	−2.0%
2011	377,935	−4.0%
2021	349,616	−7.5%

Source: ISTAT

=== Immigration ===
As of 2025, immigrants make up 6.3% of the population. The 5 largest foreign countries of birth are Romania, Switzerland, Germany, Argentina, and Morocco.
