= 500s BC (decade) =

Decade

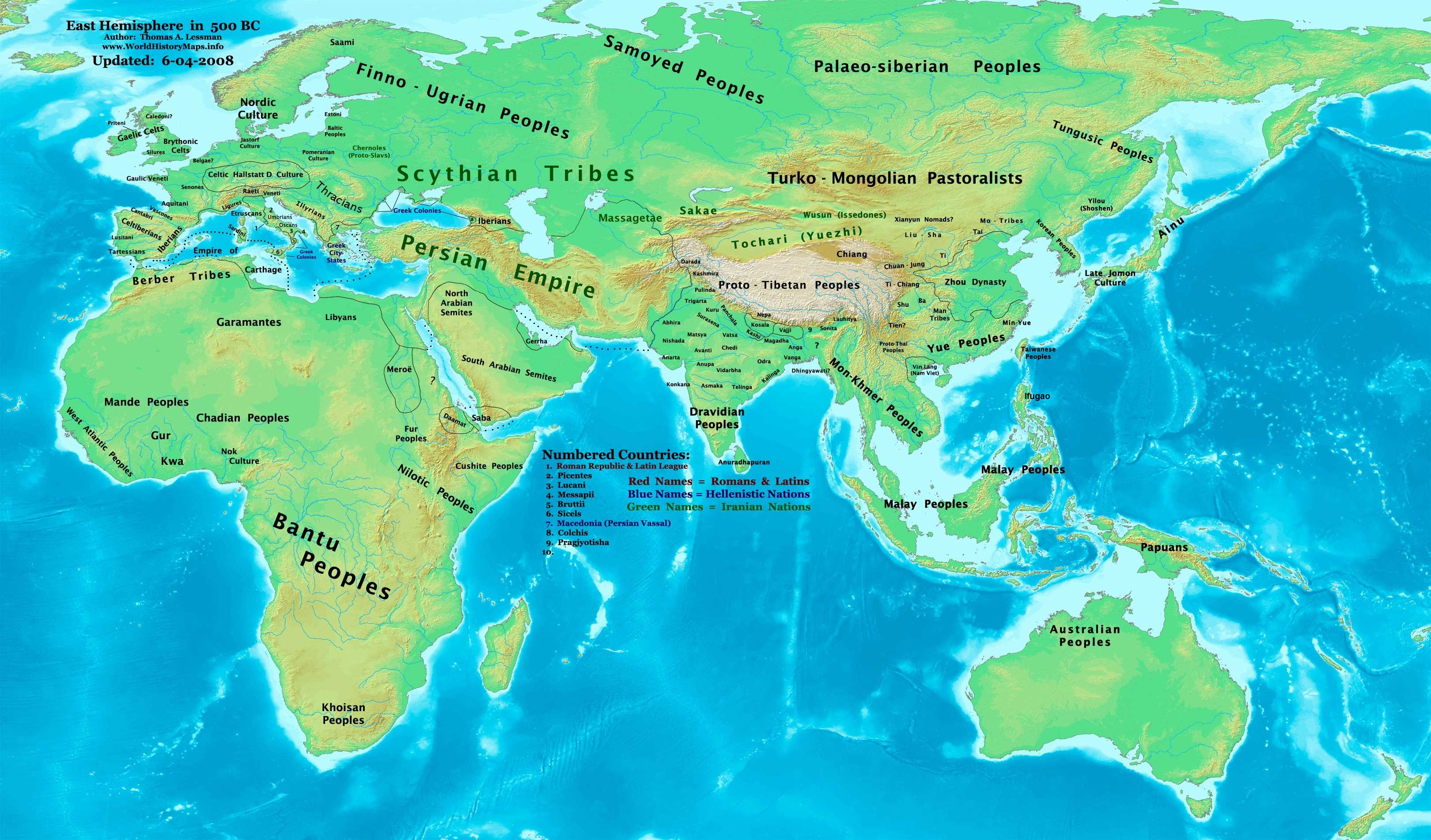
Map of the Eastern Hemisphere in 500 BC.

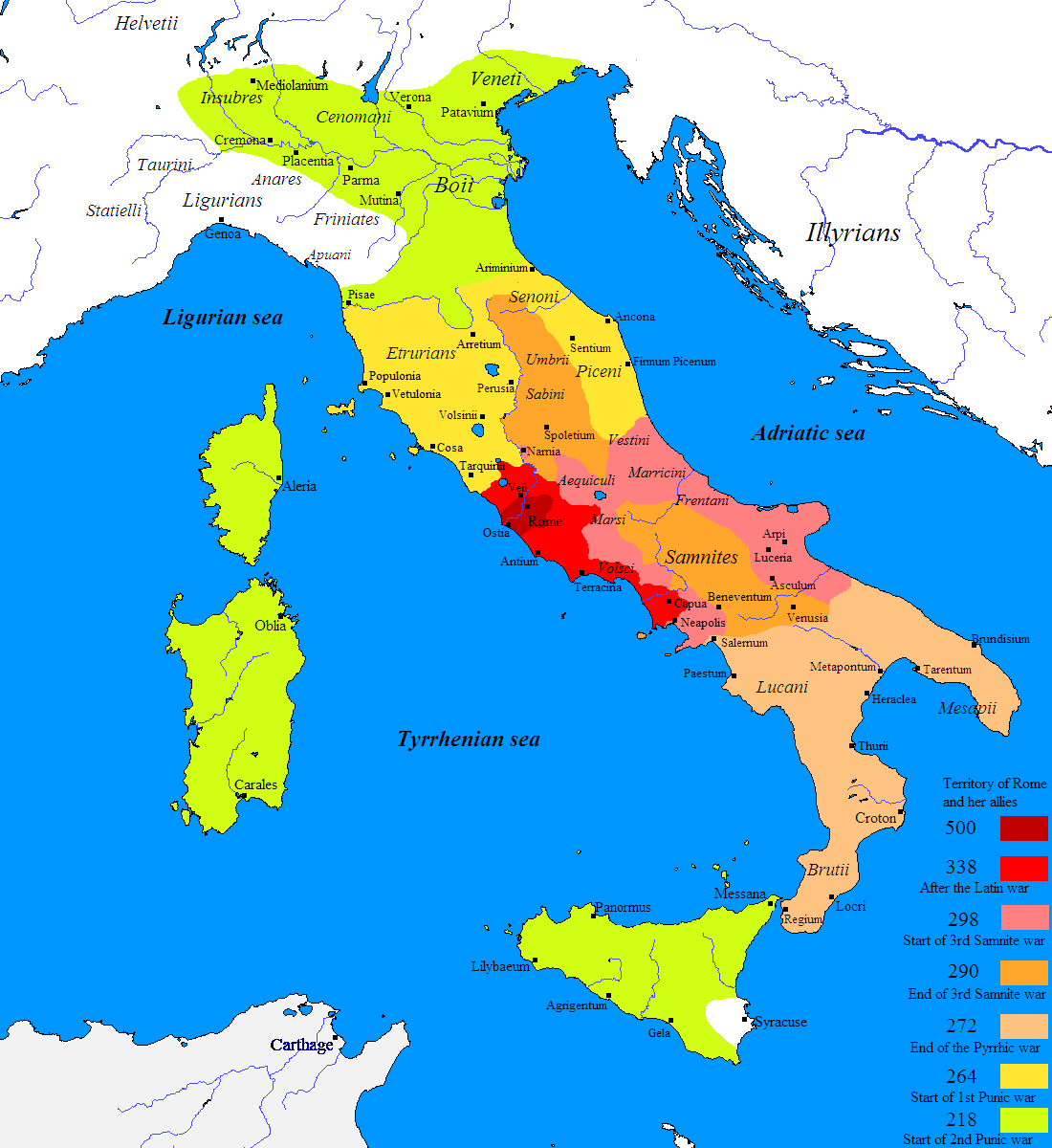
Roman expansion in Italy from 500 BC to 218 BC through the Latin War (light red), Samnite Wars (pink/orange), Pyrrhic War (beige), and First and Second Punic War (yellow and green). The Roman Republic in 500 BC is marked with dark red

== Events and trends ==
- 509 BC—Overthrow of the Roman monarchy, and start of the Republican period. First pair of consuls elected. Tarquinian conspiracy formed, but discovered and the conspirators executed. Forces of Veii and Tarquinii, led by the deposed king Lucius Tarquinius Superbus defeated in the Battle of Silva Arsia by the Roman army. Consul Publius Valerius Publicola celebrates the first republican triumph on 1 March.
- September 13, 509 BC—The Temple of Jupiter Optimus Maximus on Rome's Capitoline Hill is dedicated on the ides of September.
- 508 BC—War between Rome and Clusium
- 508 BC—War between Clusium and Aricia
- 508 BC—Office of Pontifex Maximus created in Rome.
- 508 BC—Cleisthenes reorganizes Athens. He creates the deme, a local unit to serve as the basis of his political system. Citizenship is tightly linked to the deme, for each deme keeps the roll of those within its jurisdiction, who are admitted to citizenship. He groups all the demes into ten tribes, which thus form the link between the demes and the central government. The central government includes an assembly of all citizens and a new council of five hundred members. This is a very early form of democracy.
- 508 BC—Isomachos of Kroton wins the stadion race at the 68th Olympic Games.
- 506 BC—Battle of Boju: during the Spring and Autumn period of Ancient China, the forces of the State of Wu under commander and strategist Sun Tzu defeat the forces of Chu, destroying the Chu capital of Ying and forcing King Zhao of Chu to flee.
- 505 BC–504 BC—War between Rome and the Sabines.
- 504 BC—Isomachos wins the stadion race for a second time at the 69th Olympic Games.
- 503 BC-502 BC—The Latin towns of Pometia and Cora, with the assistance of the Aurunci, unsuccessfully revolt against Rome.
- December 4, 502 BC—Solar eclipse darkens Egypt (computed by modern astronomers; no clear historical record of observation exists)
- 502 BC—Naxos rebels against Persian domination, sparking the Ionian Revolt.
- 501 BC—Naxos is attacked by the Persian Empire.
- 501 BC—In response to threats by the Sabines, Rome creates the office of dictator.
- 501 BC—Confucius is appointed governor of Chung-tu.
- 501 BC—Gadir (present-day Cádiz) is captured by Carthage. (approximate date)
- 500 BC—Bantu-speaking people migrate into south-west Uganda from the west. (approximate date)
- 500 BC—World population reaches 100,000,000—the population is 85,000,000 in the Eastern Hemisphere and 15,000,000 in the Western Hemisphere, primarily Mesoamerica (Mexico, Central America, Colombia, Peru, Venezuela).
- c. 500 BC—Vulca completes Apollo of Veii, from Portonaccio Temple. It is now kept at Museo Nazionale di Villa Giulia, Rome.
- c. 500 BC—Yayoi period starts in Ancient Japan.
- c. 500 BC—Oldest known Zapotec writing.
- 500 BC—The Zapotecs establish Monte Albán, the sacred city, and continue building pyramids. Founded toward the end of the Middle Formative period at around 500 BC, by the Terminal Formative (ca.100 BC-AD 200) Monte Albán had become the capital of a large-scale expansionist polity that dominated much of the Oaxacan highlands and interacted with other Mesoamerican regional states such as Teotihuacan to the north (Paddock 1983; Marcus 1983).
- The Gutaii tribe emerges around this time, in Middle and Southern Africa.

== Significant people ==
- c. 500 BC—Heraclitus, Greek philosopher
- Mahavir (Lord Mahavir), Last Tirthankar
- Siddharta Gautama (Lord Buddha), Founder of Buddhism
- c. 585–501 BC—Pythagoras, mathematician

== Deaths ==
- Lucretia, Roman noblewoman
- Lucius Junius Brutus, Roman consul (509 BC)
- Aruns Tarquinius, Roman prince (509 BC)
- Shen Yin Shu, general of Chu (506 BC)
- Titus Junius Brutus, Roman noble and monarchist conspirator
- Tiberius Junius Brutus, Roman noble and monarchist conspirator

== How the world looked ==
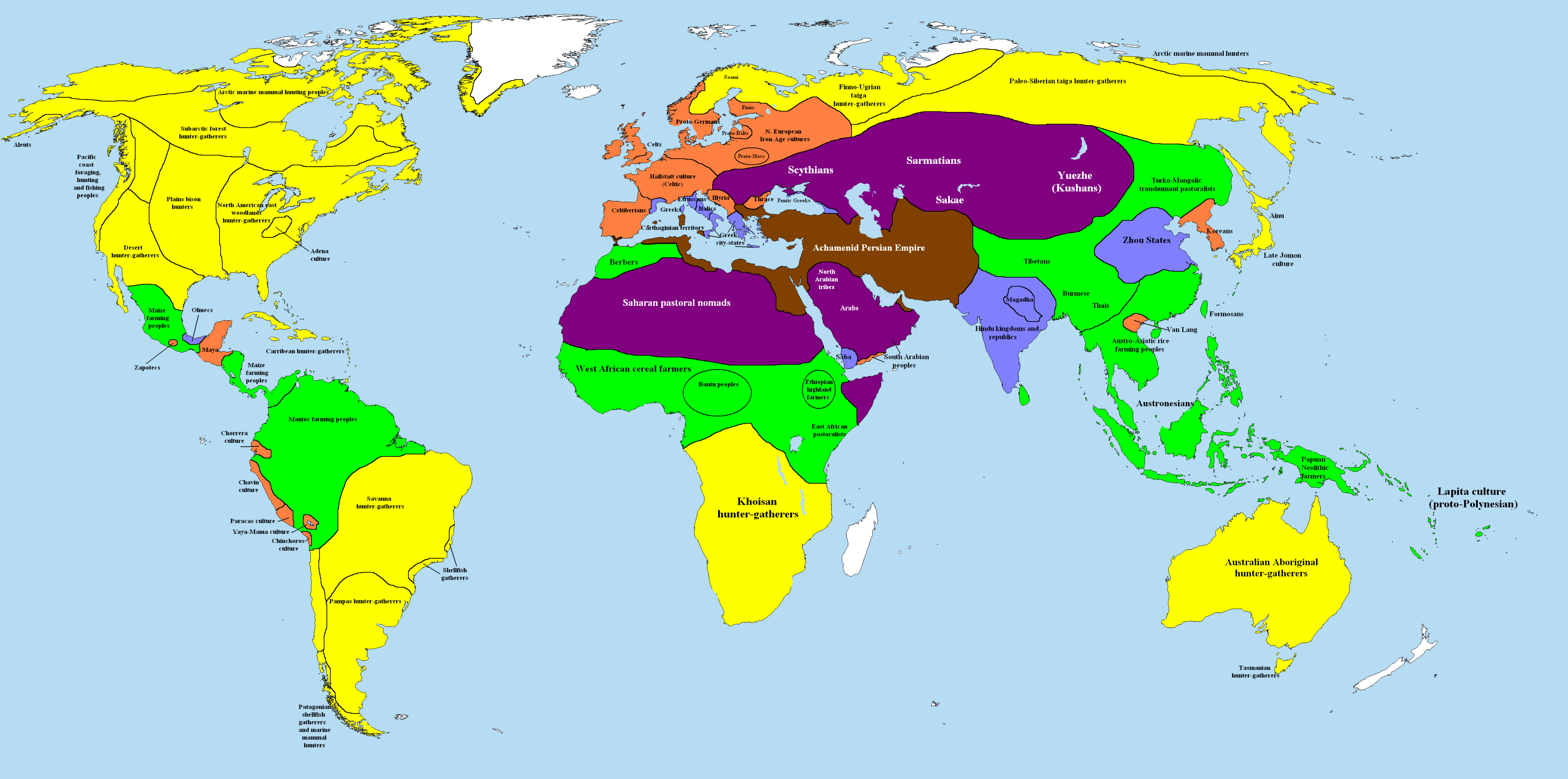
The world's cultural distribution at 500 BC
