= Liguori (surname) =

Liguori is a surname. Notable people with the surname include:

- Alphonsus Liguori (1696–1787), Roman Catholic Bishop, writer, Theologian, and founder of the Congregation of the Most Holy Redeemer
- Al Liguori (1885–1951), Italian born cinematographer
- Alphonse Liguori Chaupa (1959–2016), Roman Catholic bishop
- Alphonsus Liguori Penney (1924–2017), Canadian Roman Catholic priest who was Archbishop of St.John's from 1979 to 1991
- Ann Liguori, American sports radio and television personality
- Aurélien Lopez-Liguori (born 1993), French politician
- Ciro Liguori (born 1969), Italian rower
- Frédéric Liguori Béique (1845–1933), Canadian lawyer and politician
- Liborio Liguori (born 1950), retired Italian footballer
- Luigi Liguori (born 1998), Italian football player
- Peter Liguori (born 1960), American business executive
- PJ Liguori (born 1990), British video blogger and filmmaker
- Ralph Liguori (1926–2020), American racing driver from New York City
- Vincenzo De Liguori (born 1979), Italian footballer

== See also ==
- Liguori (disambiguation)
