= Cersosimo =

- Comune
- Comune di Cersosimo
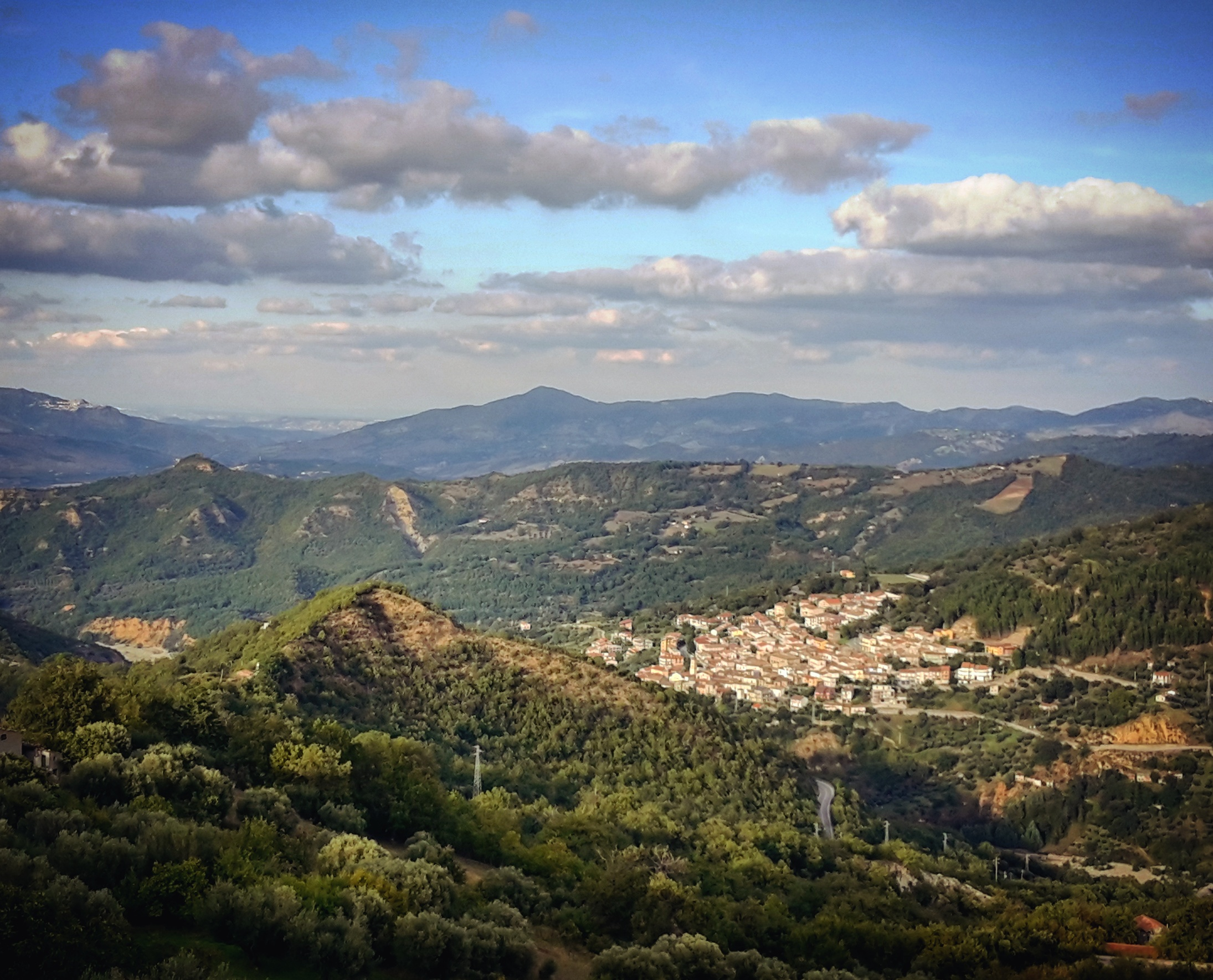
- Panoramic view of Cersosimo

- Location within Italy Location within Basilicata
- Coordinates: 40°3′N 16°21′E
- Country: Italy
- Region: Basilicata
- Province: Potenza (PZ)

Government
  - Mayor: Domenica Paglia (Cersosimo Bene Comune)

Area
  - Total: 24.75 km^{2} (9.56 sq mi)
- Elevation: 548 m (1,798 ft)
- Highest elevation: 1,179 m (3,868 ft)
- Lowest elevation: 322 m (1,056 ft)

Population (31 May 2026)
  - Total: 489
  - Density: 19.8/km^{2} (51.2/sq mi)
- Demonym: Cersosimesi
- Time zone: UTC+1 (CET)
  - Summer (DST): UTC+2 (CEST)
- Postal code: 85030
- Dialing code: 0973
- ISTAT code: 076027
- Patron saint: Our Lady of Constantinople
- Saint day: 16 May
- Website: Official website

Cersosimo is a comune in the province of Potenza, Basilicata, southern Italy. As of 2026, it has a population of 489. It lies within Pollino National Park, near the regional border with Calabria.

== Geography ==
Cersosimo lies at an elevation of 548 metres (1,798 ft) above sea level in the south-eastern part of the province of Potenza. The town stands on one of the eastern foothills of the Pollino massif, overlooking the middle valley of the Sarmento River. It sits at the foot of Monte Castello, 720 metres (2,362 ft) above sea level, which, together with Timpa Giovannicchio, forms a system of ridges sloping eastward. The municipality is crossed by the Lappio canal and the Fiumicello stream, which join before flowing into the Sarmento. It borders Noepoli, San Giorgio Lucano, and San Paolo Albanese in Basilicata, as well as Alessandria del Carretto, Castroregio, and Oriolo in the neighbouring region of Calabria.

Cersosimo is one of the Lucanian municipalities included in the Pollino National Park, a protected area established in 1988 and shared between Basilicata and Calabria. Located on the Lucanian slope of the park, within the Sarmento valley, its predominantly mountainous territory is wooded with Turkey oak and downy oak, with riparian vegetation growing along the riverbanks.

Under the Italian climatic classification system, Cersosimo is categorised in climate zone D, with 1,905 degree-days. It has a Mediterranean climate with continental influences due to its inland elevation, featuring warm to hot summers and cool, wet winters.

== History ==
=== Ancient period ===
In the 4th century BC, a fortified hilltop settlement attributed to the Lucanians arose on the summit of the Castello hill, 720 metres above sea level. The site occupied a strategic position along the inland routes of the Lucanian Apennines, allowing control over the pathways that crossed the Mount Carnara plateau (1,283 metres) towards Alessandria del Carretto and the Sybaris plain. This location facilitated contact and trade between the inland Italic communities and the Greek cities along the Ionian coast. Following the territorial reorganisation during the Roman era and changing socioeconomic conditions, the fortified site was gradually abandoned.

At the end of the 19th century, scholar Michele Lacava was the first to document the archaeological site in the journal Notizie degli scavi di antichità. Lacava recorded a circuit wall with a quadrangular plan, nearly 900 metres in perimeter, and hypothesised the presence of an acropolis on the summit. He also reported the discovery of structural remains, pottery fragments, and terracotta artefacts dating to the Hellenistic-Lucanian period.

Subsequent field surveys and archaeological investigations confirmed the site's historical significance, providing further insight into its settlement layout while leaving open several questions regarding its exact chronological development and the full extent of the structures.

=== Middle Ages ===
The origins of the modern settlement are closely tied to the expansion of Italo-Greek monasticism in the Pollino area and the Sarmento Valley between the late 10th and early 11th centuries. During this period, monks from Sicily and southern Calabria settled in the region. The name Cersosimo derives from the monastery of Santa Maria di Cersosimo, recorded in medieval documents as the monastery of Kyr Zosimos (from Byzantine Greek Kýr Zṓsimos, meaning "Abbot Zosimus"), likely founded by an abbot of that name. According to historian Giacomo Racioppi, the initial rural settlement gradually developed around this monastic complex. Several hypotheses have been proposed regarding the original location of the monastic building, including a hill east of the town in the immediate vicinity of the inhabited area.

The monastery is first documented in 1034 in the Syllabus Graecarum Membranarum, a 19th-century compilation of medieval Greek charters, although historiography places its foundation between the late 10th century and the first years of the 11th century. In 1088, the Norman lord Hugh of Chiaromonte granted the church and monastery of Kyr-Zosimos, along with its lands, vineyards, mountains, and other appurtenances, to the Benedictine Abbey of Santissima Trinità in Cava de' Tirreni. Consequently, the monastery came under the proprietary control and jurisdiction of the Cava abbey.

During the Swabian and Angevin periods, the settlement was integrated into the fiscal system of the Kingdom of Sicily. In the Angevin chancery registers of 1277, Cersosimo was recorded with 68 hearths (fuochi, representing family units), with a tax assessment set at 17 ounces, 4 tarì, and 4 grana. Over the following centuries, the territory fell under the influence of the principal feudal families of the area, notably the Chiaromonte and Sanseverino families.

=== Early modern period ===
In the 16th century, Cersosimo was included in the State of Noja (present-day Noepoli, which retained the name Noja until 1863). Following the definitive decline of the Sanseverino family, the fiefdom was acquired in 1530 by the Neapolitan nobleman Giacomo Pignatelli for 20,000 ducats; his son Fabrizio completed the redemption of the estate in 1559 with an additional payment of 8,000 ducats.

By a privilege granted on 2 June 1600, King Philip III of Spain elevated Fabrizio Pignatelli to the title of first Prince of Noja. The Principality comprised, alongside the capital, the casali of Cersosimo, San Costantino, San Giorgio, San Paolo, and Terranova—corresponding to the present-day municipalities of Noepoli, Cersosimo, San Costantino Albanese, San Giorgio Lucano, San Paolo Albanese, and Terranova di Pollino.

Under the lordship of the Pignatelli family, Cersosimo retained the status of a casale dependent on Noja from an administrative, fiscal, and jurisdictional standpoint. The local economy was based primarily on agriculture—mainly the cultivation of cereals, legumes, vines, and olive trees—as well as pastoralism, exploiting the timber and pasture resources of the Sarmento valley.

The Pignatelli family’s rule over the Principality of Noja lasted until 1806, when Joseph Bonaparte, upon becoming King of Naples, promulgated the laws suppressing feudalism (eversione della feudalità). These measures abolished baronial rights and ended the State of Noja as an administrative entity; consequently, Cersosimo attained municipal status within the Kingdom of Naples.

=== Contemporary history ===
Following Italian unification in 1861, Cersosimo was incorporated into the administrative system of the Kingdom of Italy, within the province of Basilicata.

The Pollino area and the Sarmento Valley were affected by post-unification brigandage. The wooded areas and rugged terrain provided refuge for armed bands operating between Basilicata and Calabria. Contemporary sources document brigandage in the municipal territory: on 26 March 1864, the Melidoro band was located and confronted in the territory of Cersosimo. Records relating to the suppression of brigandage also preserve a request by the then mayor to mobilise a company to ensure the security of the area.

During the 20th century, Cersosimo experienced a progressive population decline due to emigration. An initial wave of emigration to the Americas in the late 19th and early 20th centuries was followed, after World War II, by substantial migration to towns and cities in northern Italy and to northern Europe, contributing to the gradual depopulation of the town.

== Main sights ==
=== Religious architecture ===
- The Parish Church of the Assumption of the Blessed Virgin Mary (Chiesa parrocchiale dell'Assunzione della Beata Vergine Maria): the main place of worship in Cersosimo, dating back to the 15th and 16th centuries and subsequently restored, featuring a Latin cross floor plan divided into three naves with a roof supported by wooden trusses. The presbytery is elevated three steps above the nave floor at the triumphal arch. A square bell tower is located at the rear of the building, to the right side of the altar. The interior houses a 19th-century organ built by Michelangelo Colameo.
- Ruins of the Church of Costantinopoli (Chiesa di Costantinopoli): the village preserves the remains of a building whose original core dates back to the 15th century. The surviving masonry houses a Greek-Lucanian educational museum.
- Remains of the Largo Fiera Chapel (Cappella di Largo Fiera): located in Largo Fiera, they belonged to a chapel dating back to the early 19th century, which was demolished in the 1970s. The surviving masonry features stones of varying sizes, arranged in horizontal courses and bound with lime mortar.

=== Civil architecture and monuments ===
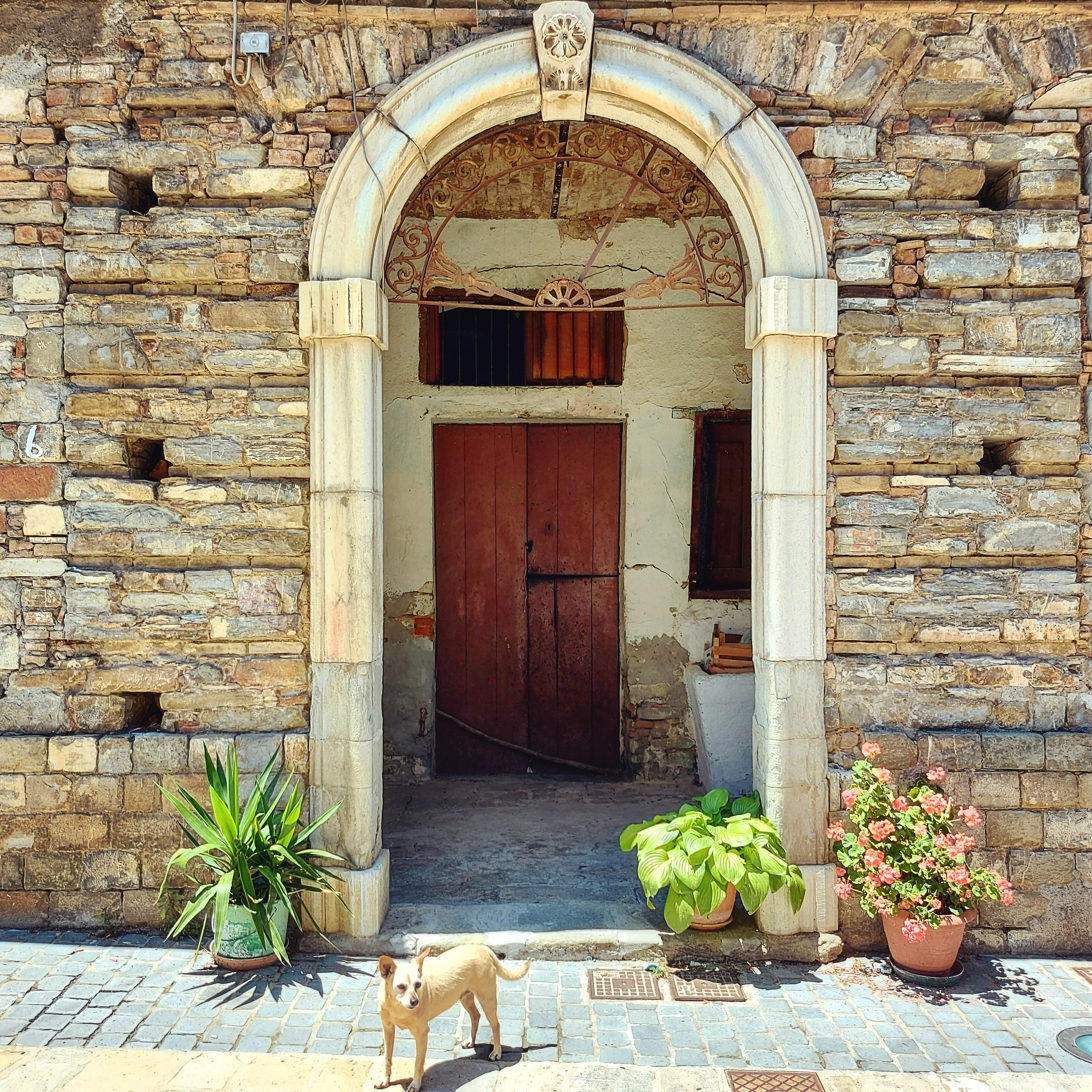
Palazzo Valicenti

- Palazzo Valicenti: located on Via Roma, it is the oldest noble palace in the village, traditionally dated to the 17th century. It preserves a sculpted stone portal, a wrought-iron gate, and historical window grilles.
- Stone portals: the historic centre preserves stone portals of ancient noble palaces, made between the 18th and 19th centuries by local stonemasons.

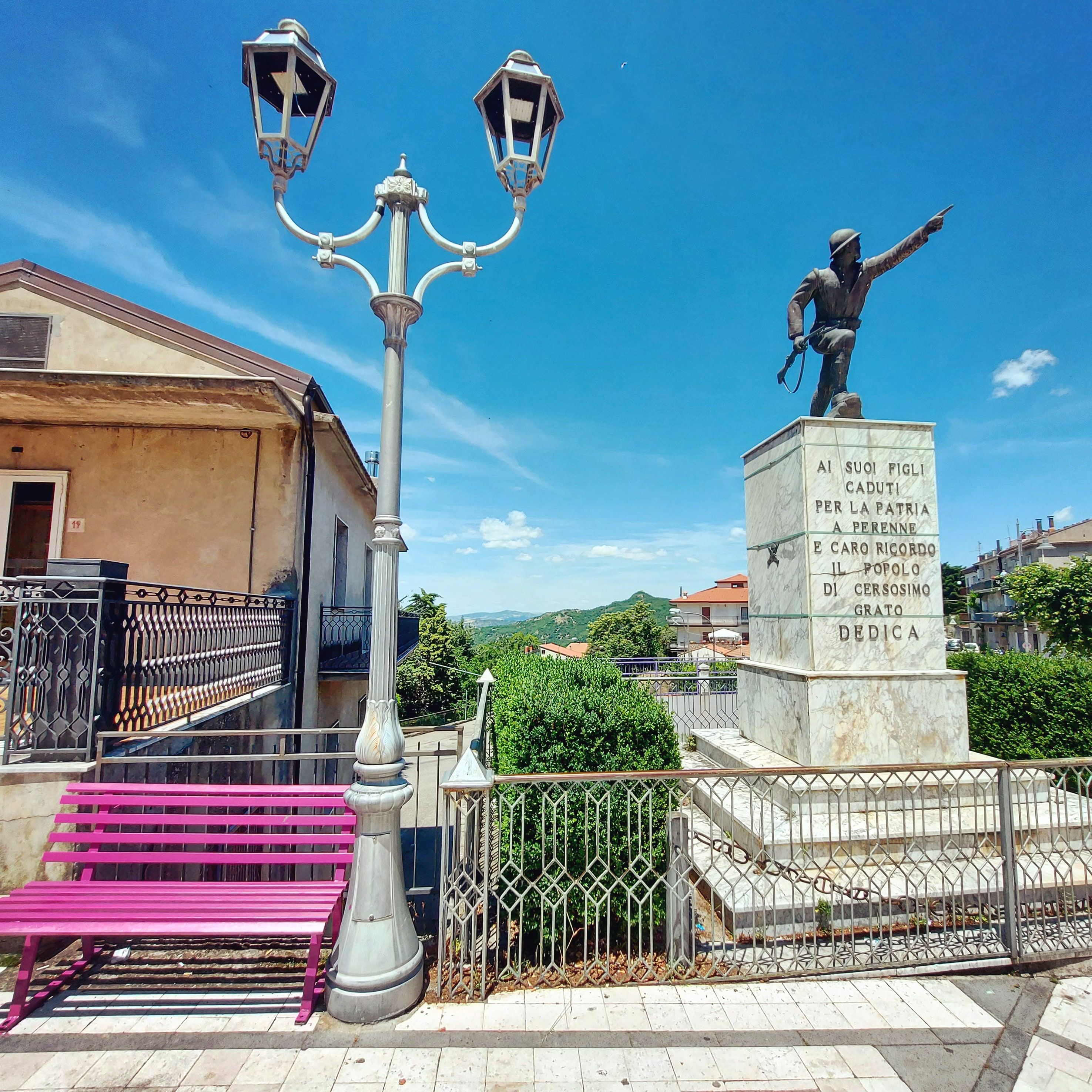
Cersosimo viewed from Piazza Unità, with the war memorial visible

- War memorial: dedicated to those who died in World War I.

=== Archaeological sites ===
- Monte Castello archaeological area: a fortified Lucanian settlement dating back to the 4th–3rd centuries BC, located on the hill overlooking the modern town and corresponding to the acropolis of an ancient settlement. From the Lucanian period, the area preserves a defensive wall built in opus quadratum, two major architectural complexes, and the southern entrance to the fortification. On the summit, rectangular rooms arranged in terraces—probably part of a public building—have been brought to light, along with ceramic materials, pithoi, iron wedges, and remains of carbonised grain. In the surrounding areas, remains of the Madarossa farm, dated to the 3rd century BC, and necropolises with alla cappuccina tombs were discovered. Among the notable finds is a coin bearing the ethnic name of the Lucans. Research also indicates site occupation extending into the medieval era up to the 12th century AD; the artefacts are preserved at the National Archaeological Museum of the Siritide in Policoro, while educational replicas are exhibited at the ArcheoParco di Cersosimo.

== Demographics ==
=== Foreign residents ===
As of 1 January 2025, foreign residents in the municipality numbered 6, accounting for 1.18% of the population.

=== Religion ===
The majority of the population is Roman Catholic, belonging to the Diocese of Tursi-Lagonegro and centred on the parish of the Assumption of the Blessed Virgin Mary (Assunzione della Beata Vergine Maria). The town is also home to a historic Protestant community, represented by the Baptist Evangelical Church (Chiesa Evangelica Battista), affiliated with the Christian Evangelical Baptist Union of Italy (Unione Cristiana Evangelica Battista d'Italia, UCEBI).

== Culture ==
=== Education ===
The municipality is home to a preschool and a primary school, both part of the "Nicola Sole" comprehensive institute based in Senise.

=== Libraries ===
The town is home to the Cersosimo Municipal Library, registered in the Italian Library Registry (Anagrafe delle biblioteche italiane) under the code IT-PZ0028. Its operation and services are governed by regulations approved by municipal council resolution no. 3 of 2021.

=== Museums ===
The Cersosimo Archaeological Park (ArcheoParco di Cersosimo) is an exhibition space and educational museum dedicated to Greek and Lucanian civilisation, housed in the remains of the former church of the Madonna di Costantinopoli. It exhibits copies of artefacts found in south-eastern Basilicata and is linked to the enhancement of the Greek-Lucanian settlement of Monte Castello, dating back to the 4th century BC. The educational exhibition route integrates multimedia supports and a mobile augmented reality application dedicated to visiting the acropolis.

=== Language ===
Alongside standard Italian, which is used in education, administration and most formal contexts, Cersosimo has traditionally had a local Romance vernacular. It belongs to the Lucanian dialect group, the varieties of Italo-Romance traditionally spoken in Basilicata, historically known as Lucania.

Cersosimo lies in the southern part of the province of Potenza, within the conservative linguistic area identified by Heinrich Lausberg as the Mittelzone and commonly referred to as the Lausberg area. This area extends across the Lucanian–Calabrian Apennines and is noted for several archaic linguistic features. In common with neighbouring communities in the Pollino area, the local speech shows affinities with northern Calabrian varieties, reflecting the municipality’s position near the regional border.

The Cersosimo vernacular has been documented by fieldwork for the Atlante Linguistico della Basilicata (A.L.Ba.), a regional dialect atlas covering the municipalities of Basilicata. Among the features recorded in the municipality is the retention of distinct second-person singular and plural verb endings, a conservative morphological trait found in several southern Lucanian dialects. Like many local varieties in Basilicata, it is primarily a spoken form and has no official status; its use has generally been strongest in informal domestic and community settings.

=== Cuisine ===
The gastronomic tradition of Cersosimo is tied to the peasant and pastoral culture of the Val Sarmento, within the Pollino National Park area and southern Lucania. It is characterised by the use of local products, including pork and mutton, cheeses and vegetables.

First courses include homemade pasta, rascatelli and firzuli, traditionally prepared also with breadcrumbs or with garlic, oil and red peppers. Documented second courses include carne alla pastorale, roasted or grilled kid goat, pork rind with beans or savoy cabbage, pepper stew with sausage, and peperoni cruschi.

Cured meat production includes sausages, soppressata, ham and pork rind in aspic. Cheeses and dairy products include pecorino, ricotta, cacioricotta and caciocavallo. Baked products include homemade bread and flatbreads.

Spumino di Cersosimo is a sweet recognised as a traditional agri-food product (PAT) by the Italian Ministry of Agricultural, Food and Forestry Policies. Among the preparations associated with festivities are Christmas crispelle and Carnival pettole.

=== Events ===
- Feast of Santa Maria di Costantinopoli: held on 16 May, it is the main patronal festival, in the context of the area’s Byzantine heritage.
- Feast of Saint Vincent Ferrer: celebrated on 11 August, it is a major summer event that gathers the local community and returning emigrants.

== Transport ==
The main road serving Cersosimo is State Road 481 (Strada statale 481 della Valle del Ferro, SS 481). It begins at a junction with the former State Road 92 (Strada statale 92 dell’Appennino meridionale, SS 92) near Noepoli, crosses the municipal territory of Cersosimo, and directly serves the town. After crossing into Calabria, it continues toward Oriolo and Amendolara, joining State Road 106 Jonica near Amendolara Scalo. The SS 481 is therefore the municipality's principal road link with the rest of Basilicata and Calabria.

Through the local road network of the Sarmento Valley, the area is connected to State Road 742 (Strada statale 742 Sarmentana-Sinnica, SS 742), a link road connecting the valley-floor road network to State Road 653 (SS 653 della Valle del Sinni) and, to the north, to the former SS 92 near Noepoli.

State Road 653, a fast-flowing arterial road running alongside the Sinni River, provides the area's higher-ranking connection: it links the A2 Autostrada del Mediterraneo at the Lauria interchange with State Road 106 Jonica near Policoro, giving access to the motorway network, the Ionian coast, and the main centres of southern Basilicata.

Interurban public bus transport is managed by the COTRAB regional consortium and operated by SITA Sud. Regular bus routes connect Cersosimo to neighbouring municipalities on the Terranova di Pollino–Senise line, with Senise serving as a local transit hub for connections to Potenza and coastal destinations.

Interregional bus connections to the neighbouring province of Cosenza in Calabria are provided by InterSaj, linking Cersosimo to Oriolo and to the Trebisacce railway station.
