= 500 BC =

500 BC in various calendars
- Gregorian calendar: 500 BC; D BC
- Ab urbe condita: 254
- Ancient Egypt era: XXVII dynasty, 26
- Pharaoh: Darius I of Persia, 22
- Ancient Greek Olympiad (summer): 70th Olympiad (victor)¹
- Assyrian calendar: 4251
- Balinese saka calendar: N/A
- Bengali calendar: −1093 – −1092
- Berber calendar: 451
- Buddhist calendar: 45
- Burmese calendar: −1137
- Byzantine calendar: 5009–5010
- Chinese calendar: 庚子年 (Metal Rat); 2198 or 1991 — to — 辛丑年 (Metal Ox); 2199 or 1992
- Coptic calendar: −783 – −782
- Discordian calendar: 667
- Ethiopian calendar: −507 – −506
- Hebrew calendar: 3261–3262
- Hindu calendars
- Vikram Samvat: −443 – −442
- Shaka Samvat: N/A
- Kali Yuga: 2601–2602
- Holocene calendar: 9501
- Iranian calendar: 1121 BP – 1120 BP
- Islamic calendar: 1155 BH – 1154 BH
- Javanese calendar: N/A
- Julian calendar: N/A
- Korean calendar: 1834
- Minguo calendar: 2411 before ROC 民前2411年
- Nanakshahi calendar: −1967
- Thai solar calendar: 43–44
- Tibetan calendar: ལྕགས་ཕོ་བྱི་བ་ལོ་ (male Iron-Rat) −373 or −754 or −1526 — to — ལྕགས་མོ་གླང་ལོ་ (female Iron-Ox) −372 or −753 or −1525

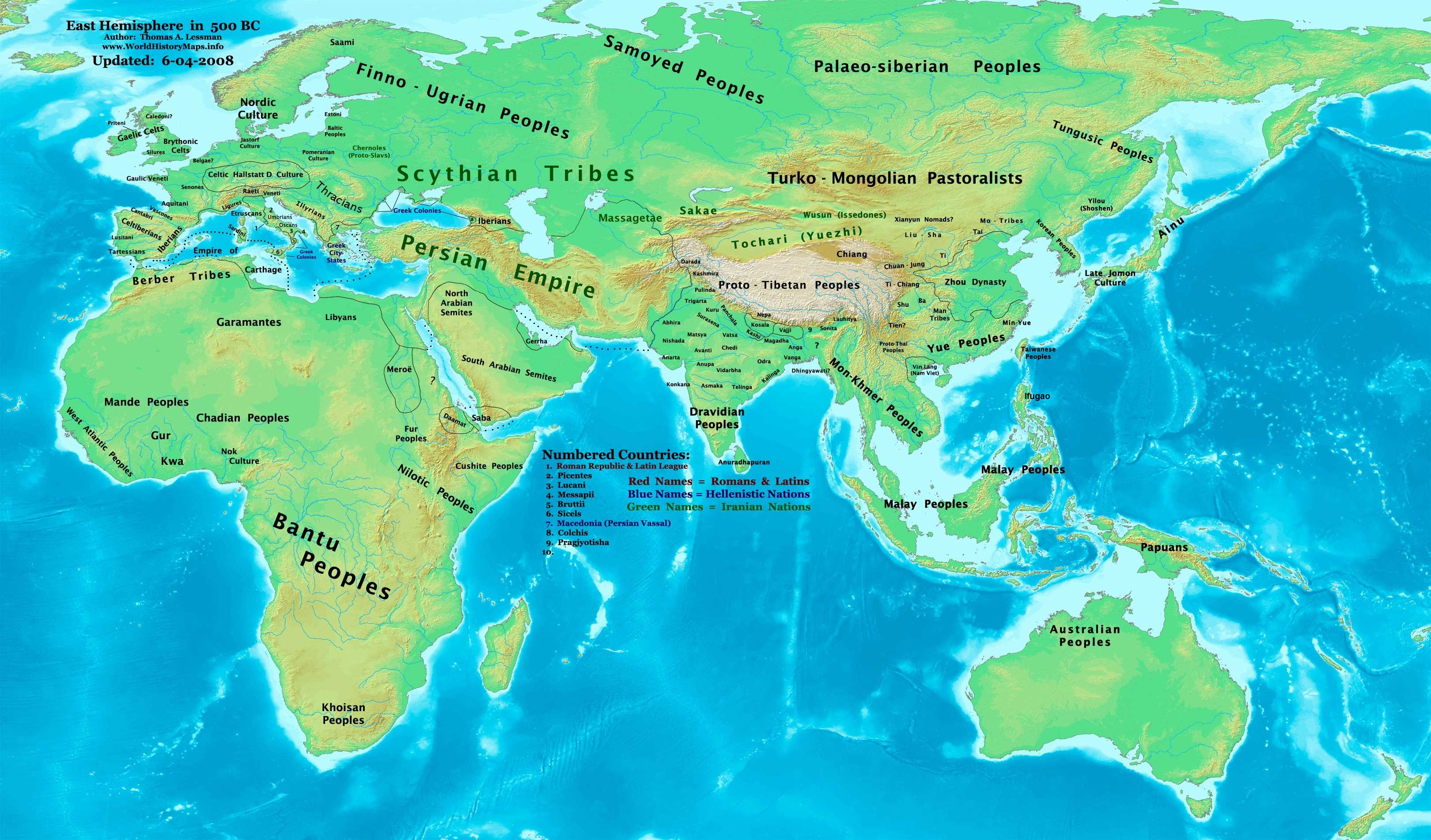
Map of the Eastern Hemisphere in 500 BCE.

The year 500 BC was a year of the pre-Julian Roman calendar. In the Roman Republic it was known as the Year of the Consulship of Camerinus and Longus (or, less frequently, year 254 Ab urbe condita). when the Anno Domini calendar era became the prevalent method in Europe for naming years.

== Events ==
=== By place ===
==== Europe ====
- Vulca makes Apollo of Veii, from Portonaccio Temple, now kept at Museo Nazionale di Villa Giulia, Rome.
- The Nordic Bronze Age civilization ends and the Pre-Roman Iron Age begins in Scandinavia, according to the Oscar Montelius periodization system (approximate date).
- Refugees from Teos resettle Abdera.

==== Middle East ====
- Darius I of Persia proclaims that Aramaic will be the official language of the western half of his empire.

==== Africa ====
- Bantu-speaking people migrate into south-west Uganda from Central Africa. (approximate date)
- The Hutu tribe emerges around this time, in Middle and Southern Africa. (approximate date)
- Hanno the Navigator's naval exploration of the western coast of Africa could have reached as far south as Gabon.

==== Asia ====
- The first republic in Vaishali, Bihar, India, is founded.
- States in existence include the Kingdom of Pratipalapura (centred on modern Bhattiprolu, in Guntur district, Andhra Pradesh).
- According to the records of Shankara Mutts, a proponent of the Advaita Vedanta Sri Adi Shankaracharya was born in this century
- Early Pandyan Kingdom was ruled by the Pandyas during the second Sangam period.
- Yayoi period starts in Ancient Japan (approximate date).

==== Mesoamerica ====
- The oldest known Zapotec writing appears (approximate date).
- The Olmec established Monte Albán, the sacred city, and continued building pyramids. Founded toward the end of the Middle Formative period at around 500 BCE, by the Terminal Formative (ca.100 BCE–CE 200) Monte Albán soon became the capital of a large-scale expansionist polity that dominated much of the Oaxacan highlands and interacts with other Mesoamerican regional states, such as Teotihuacan to the north (Paddock 1983; Marcus 1983).

=== By topic ===
==== Demographics ====
- The world population reaches 100,000,000—85,000,000 in the Eastern Hemisphere and 15,000,000 in the Western Hemisphere, primarily Mesoamerica and northern South America (Mexico, Central America, Colombia, Peru, Venezuela).

==== Arts and culture ====
- The She-wolf, with late 15th century or early 16th century additions (twins), is made. It is now kept at the Museo Capitolino in Rome (approximate date).

==== Inventions, discoveries, introductions ====
- Mesoamerican calendars are developed by the Olmec civilisation

== Births ==
- Anaxagoras, Pre-Socratic Greek philosopher (approximate date) (d. 428 BCE)
