= Gjitonia =

Italian form of consolidated social cooperation

The gjitonia is a form of consolidated social cooperation and today little present in the whole historical Arbëreshë region.

It differs from the typical Italian "rione" for its urban architecture and social contribution.

== Etymology ==
The word gjitonìa is a complex word that contains social values of parental extraction of the ancient extended family Arbëreshë; literally from Albanian gjitonìa, gjit / ngjit or 'neighborhood' or 'the neighbor', in detail the medieval Albanian word, it is used by arvaniti, or those Albanian populations established securely in present-day Greece, while it is less widespread, or in other cases disappeared, in Albania (or 'place of the five senses', gjitonë is "literally the opposite of the indigenous neighborhood") [without source]. The origins of gjitonia in the countries of southern Italy are linked to three fundamental elements of a material type: the fence that delimits the space shared by the family, the state, or the house, meeting place and material refuge and the botanical garden, the place of pharmacy. A journey to the places of the historical region.

Gjitonië comes from the union of the words gjindë tonë ('people of the same linguistic tonality') (or in another version it would derive from gjithë tonë 'all ours'), and is made up of two words: Gji indicating 'the people' and tonië meaning 'people who are able to make the tones of the five senses vibrate in their lived environments and confirm their belonging through the idiomatic metric'.

== Architectural-urban aspect ==
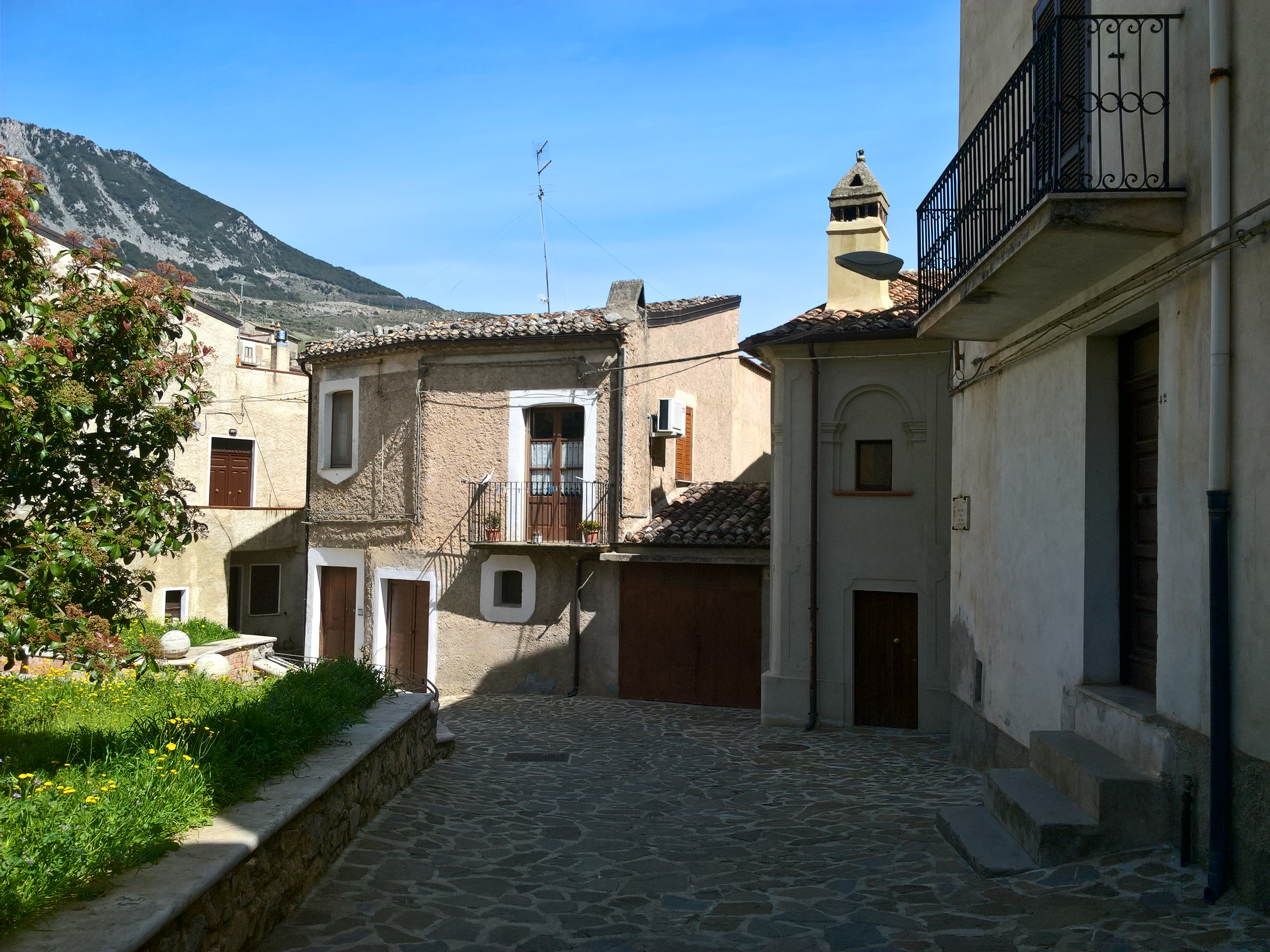
Uno scorcio di Civita, in Calabria

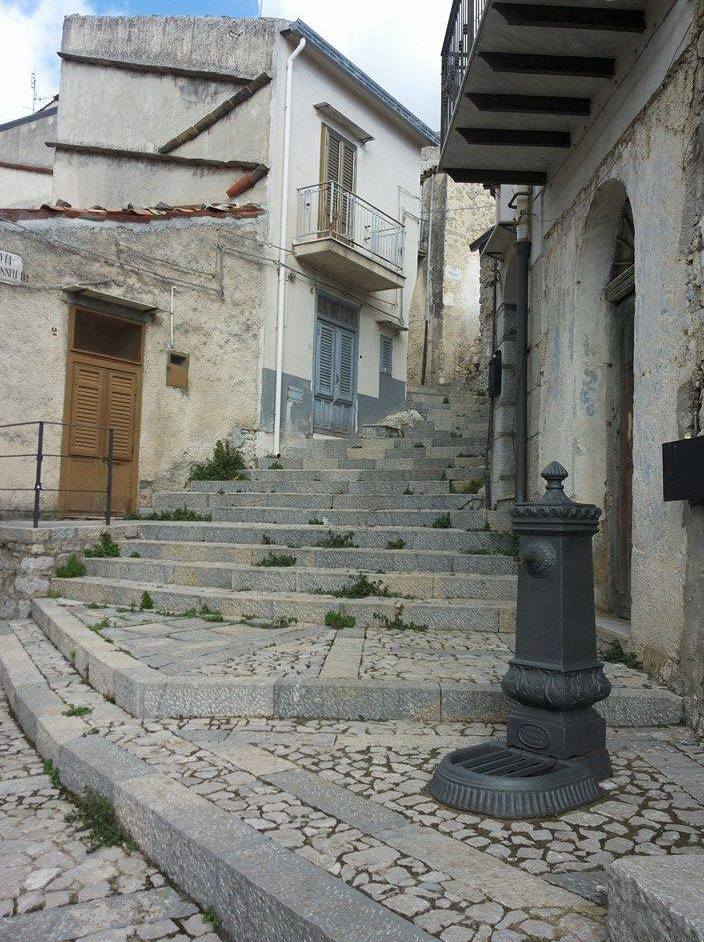
Një gjitonì (un vicinato) a Piana degli Albanesi, in Sicilia

Unlike the districts, the "gjitonie" are small agglomerations of houses often attached to each other (often understood as the smallest portion of the urban fabric) (however, as it represents a historically complex social phenomenon and as it represents a Mediterranean model, this definition does not find all enthusiasts and scholars unanimous) [without source]. The peculiarity is in the constitution of small houses that are usually built in a semicircle, flanking a "mother" house called "stately home" and all overlook a small square or open space. The gjitonia unlike the neighborhood that unites people in the sense of built, represents a social model that crosses what could be found in the indigenous neighborhood. The social structure is foreign to the typical architecture of Italian centers. The various "gjitonie" are connected to each other by small and narrow alleys, so much so that it is difficult to access them by car and in recent times this has penalized the historic centers favoring large residential complexes.

The "gjitonie" represents for the Arbereshe, Arberi or Arbanon the place of the root of the original extended family stock, it originated in the aftermath of the growth of the group that did not exceed but twenty elements, reached this name it expired and was repeated each time the generated groups reached the partition number. For this the phenomenon continually generated the search for the original stock and in order to become part of it, it was necessary to provide a series of elements of historical memory that could guarantee the originality of the dynasty. For this reason the gjitonia is the indefinite place within which the sounds and the proximity of a scattered identity are perceived and which meets to share moments and difficulties that life has in store for us

In the case of Lungro, the "gjitonie" and the urban center were the focus of a historical-urbanistic study.

== Social aspect ==
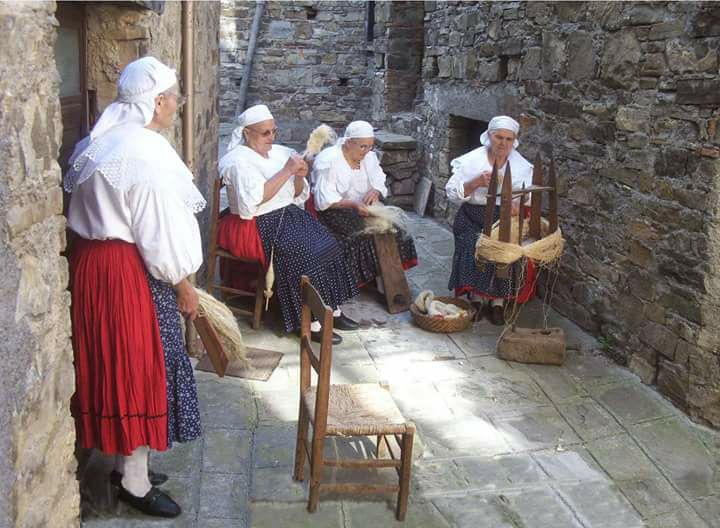
Donne di San Paolo Albanese, Basilicata, lavorando la lana all'aperto nella gjitonia.

The social aspect of "gjitonia" mainly refers to an ancient and historical experience where at the basis of human relationships coexisted values of hospitality and solidarity between the families of the neighborhood and where the aggregation was lived without difference of social classes . Mainly for the Italian-Albanian communities the "gjitonia" is a world where relationships were so strong as to create real family relationships, so much so that the phrase in Arbëresh is typical. Gjitoni gjirì ("vinato parentato").

Perhaps handed down by the Albanians of origin, the gjitonia is close to the values of kanùn ("Family, Individual and Hospitality") albeit contaminated and altered by customs over the years and local customs. The gjitonia has therefore become a place of socialization and contagion of knowledge and anecdotes or where one was preparing to learn a "profession" as a beginner, but it is also still a place where sacred and profane are intertwined, or, where religious songs alternate with fairy tales and popular songs.

Typically the " gjitonie " are also the place where votive bonfires for the saints are lit or where stops for religious processions are set up; these events are treated with the participation of the whole neighborhood as a unit.

The use of the "half-door", the sharing of basic necessities, the participation of the whole gjitonia in mourning and joys are some of the most visible social aspects of this phenomenon that has been diminishing over the years with depopulation of the communities Arbëreshë. In Lungro, for example, to make the meaning of " gjitonia " more marked, the neighborhood used to (and in some cases still today) get together for a mate (an Argentinian drink imported from Lungresi emigrants).

== Modern times ==
In recent years, for various causes such as depopulation and demographic decline in the first place, instability hydrogeological, unappealing houses, architectural barriers, historic centers not accessible by cars and other reasons, this phenomenon has is slowly fading; this "light" is kept by the elderly who continue with their daily rites to keep alive the traditional gjitonia arbëreshe.

In the village of San Basile (CS) since 2010 the " A house in San Basile " initiative has been active by the municipal administration, or the sale of houses in the historic center at reasonable prices to encourage repopulation, the tourist vocation of the place and "stop" the loss of " gjitonie ".

== See also ==
- Rione

== Bibliography ==
- Mattanò Vincenzo Maria, 2012, Il centro antico di Lungro. Un raro documento di rigore tipologico e di sofisticata strategia insediativa, Il Coscile.
- Rennis Giovan Battista, 2000, La tradizione popolare della comunità arbëreshe di Lungro, Il Coscile.
