= San Costantino Albanese =

- Comune
- Comune di San Costantino Albanese; Bashkia Shën Kostandinit i Arbëreshëvet
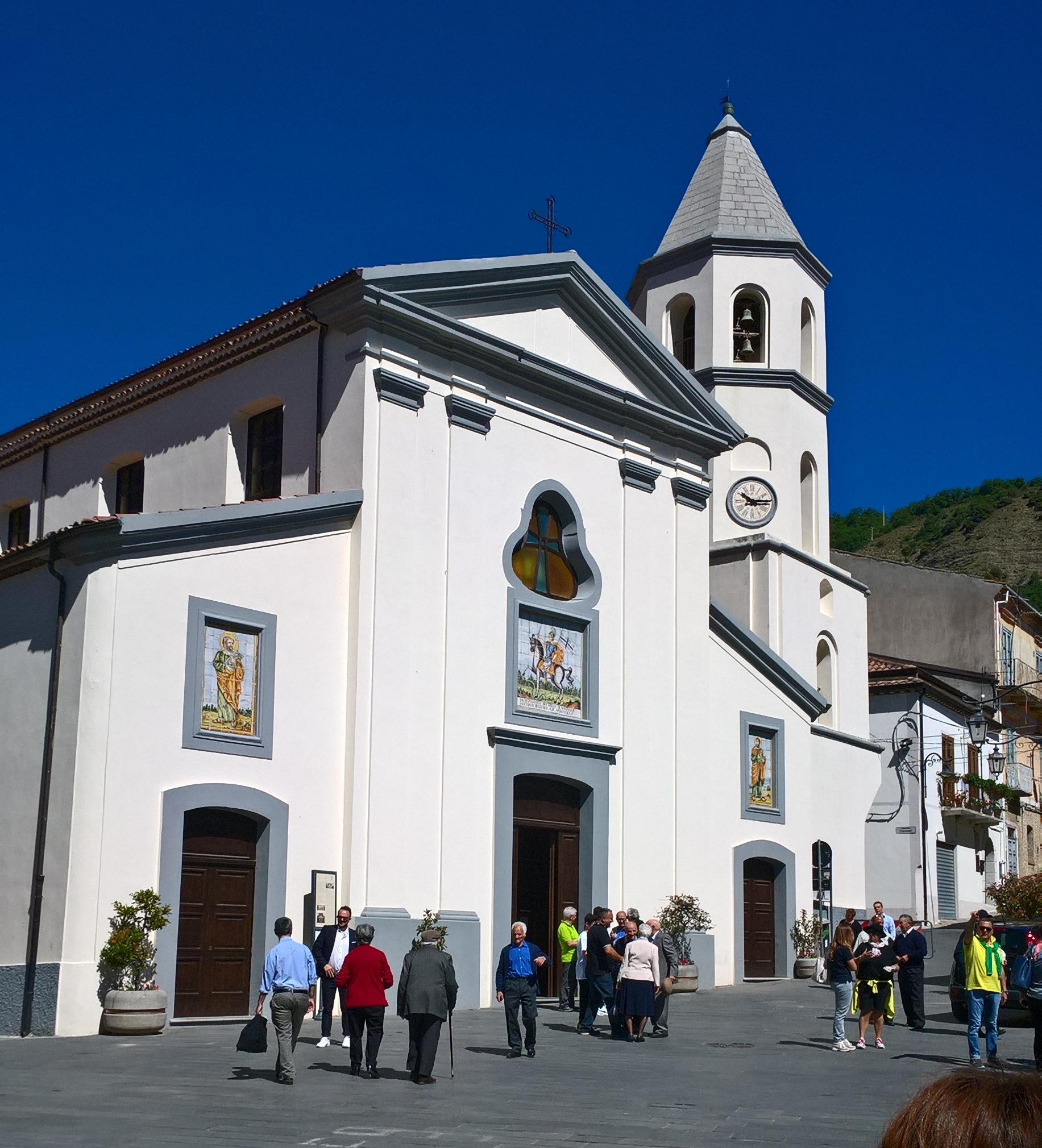
- Church of San Costantino il Grande, San Costantino Albanese

- Location within Italy Location within Basilicata
- Coordinates: 40°2′N 16°18′E
- Country: Italy
- Region: Basilicata
- Province: Potenza (PZ)
- Frazioni: Conserva, Farneta, Martorino, Venticalia

Government
  - Mayor: Renato Iannibelli

Area
  - Total: 37 km^{2} (14 sq mi)
- Elevation: 650 m (2,130 ft)

Population (31 March 2015)
  - Total: 738
  - Density: 20/km^{2} (52/sq mi)
- Demonym: Sancostantinesi
- Time zone: UTC+1 (CET)
  - Summer (DST): UTC+2 (CEST)
- Postal code: 85030
- Dialing code: 0973
- ISTAT code: 076075
- Patron saint: St. Constantine the Great
- Saint day: 21 May

San Costantino Albanese (Arbëreshë Albanian: Shën Kostandinit i Arbëreshëvet) is an Arbëreshë town and comune in the province of Potenza, in the Southern Italian region of Basilicata.

== Geography ==
San Costantino Albanese sits on a hilltop overlooking the Sarmento Valley and is located across the valley from San Paolo Albanese. The Sarmento River is a dry rock-strewn riverbed during the summer but can be a torrent during the winter rains. The two towns are 3 kilometres (2 mi) apart but the path through the river valley by road is about 8 kilometres (5 mi).

The village is bordered by the towns of Alessandria del Carretto, Cersosimo, Noepoli, San Paolo Albanese and Terranova di Pollino.

It is also adjacent to Pollino National Park.

== History ==
San Costantino Albanese was founded in approximately 1534 by ethnic Albanians refugees or Arbëreshë, from Corone, Morea in Greece which was occupied by the Ottoman Turks. Surnames such as Scutari, reflect this connection with the Albanian heritage.

In the early 20th century, the town, like much of Southern Italy, saw a wave of emigration to the United States and South America. Immigrants initially clustered in the New York Metropolitan Area but later distributed throughout the USA.

== Frazioni ==
=== Venticalia ===
Venticalia is a village located approximately 3.9 kilometres (2.4 mi) from San Costantino.

Since the end of the 17th century, it has been the feudal rustic retreat of the Pace family of St. Constantine Albanese. In the seventeenth century. the Pace family built a small votive chapel dedicated to the cult of Saint Helena mother of the Emperor Constantine, of which today only a few remnants remain visible.

Today the village is the site of a compressed wood pellet factory.

=== Martorino ===
Martorino is one of the concessions granted by the Pignatelli feudal family in the late 17th century to the Pace family.

Local businesses include agriculture and agritourism.

== Notable people from San Costantino Albanese ==
- Michele Scutari (1762–1830), archpriest, writer and Albanian patriot
- Liborio Liguori (born 1950), football player.
