= Apollo of Veii =

Late 6th century BC painted terracotta Etruscan statue of Apollo

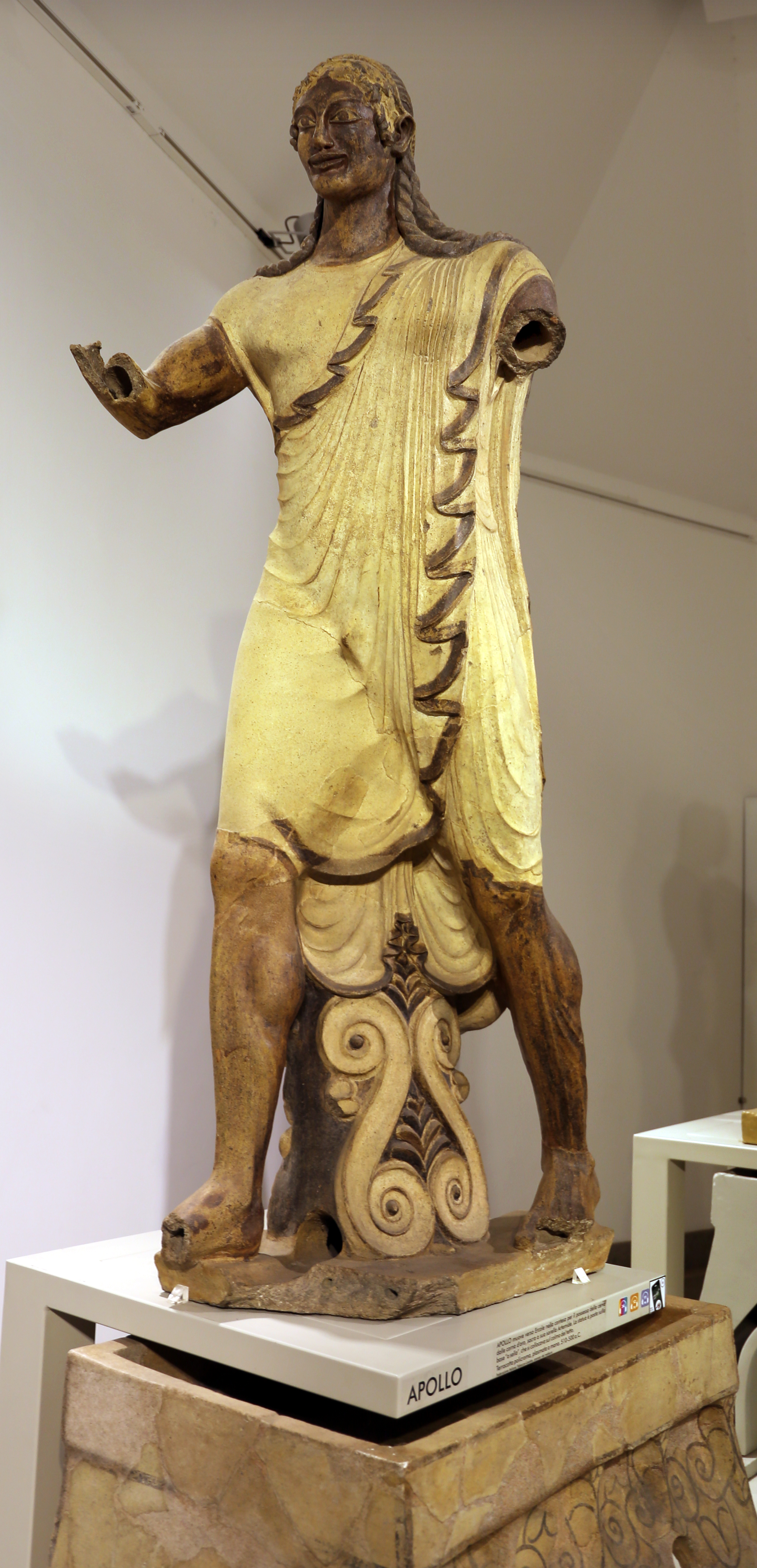
- Artist: Vulca
- Year: c. 510-500 BCE
- Type: Terracotta
- Dimensions: 180 cm (71 in)
- Location: National Etruscan Museum, Rome

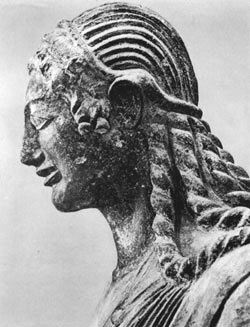
Another view

The Apollo of Veii is a life-size painted terracotta Etruscan statue of Aplu (Apollo), designed to be placed at the highest part of a temple. The statue was discovered in the Portonaccio sanctuary of ancient Veii, Latium, in what is now central Italy, and dates from c. 510-500 BCE. It was created in the so-called "international" Ionic or late-archaic Etruscan style.

The statue was discovered in 1916, and is now on display in the National Etruscan Museum in Rome.

== Creator ==
The statue was probably made by Vulca, an Etruscan artist who was also responsible for the Temple of Jupiter Optimus Maximus, according to Pliny. He is the only Etruscan artist known by name.

== Excavation & Restoration ==
Although excavations had occurred at Veii as early as the mid-1600s, work on the sanctuary itself began in 1914. It was sponsored by the Museo Villa Giulia and the Soprintendenza dell'Etruria Meridionale (Superintendency of Southern Etruria), and led by archaeologists Antonio Maria Colini, Ettore Gabrici, Guilio Giglioli, and Enrico Stefani. The Apollo was found on May 19th, 1916, in a trench dug out from the hill the sanctuary sits on.

The statue was not displayed in the National Etruscan Museum until 1919, coinciding with the discovery's first publication in the archaeology periodical Notizie degli scavi di antichità ("News of Archaeological Excavations"), with a report by Giglioli titled "Statue fittili di età arcaica" ("Archaic-period terracotta statues"). In 1920, Giglioli would publish another report, "Veio, la città morta" ("Veii, the dead city") in the art magazine Emporium.

In 2004, the National Etruscan Museum, sponsored by The Italian Tobacconists Federation for Arts and Culture (FIT), set out to reanalyze the statue with more modern scientific equipment. Specifically, they were interested in learning more about the artistic technique and the type of materials used. The work was done at the Villa Guilia, behind glass through which museum-goers could view the progress of the restoration. They were able to confirm that the statue had been fired as a single piece and the sandy composition of the terracotta made the statue "sensitive to thermodynamic fluctuations". After six months, the statue was put on display again.

== Mythological depiction ==
This terracotta statue was part of a scene of Apollo and Heracles contending over the Ceryneian Hind, placed 12 metres above the ground on beams on the acroterion of the Portonaccio Sanctuary of Minerva.

Together with other statues, it decorated the roof beams of the Portonaccio temple, a sanctuary dedicated to Minerva. Placed on high plinths, this series of statues was acroterial. They stood some twelve metres above the ground level, and even though they were created separately, they narrated events from Greek mythology that were at least in part tied to the god Apollo.

This statue, together with the statue of Heracles, formed a group representing one of the labours of the hero before his apotheosis made him one of the divinities of Olympus. The myth narrates the contention between the god and the hero for the possession of the doe with the golden horns. There was probably also a statue of Mercury united to this group, of which only the head and a part of the body remain. Heracles, with the doe tied around, is outstretched towards the right, leaning forwards to attack with his bludgeon and with his torso in a violent curve.

== Appearance ==
The statue is made of 1.25 inch thick terracotta and polished all-over with yellow clay. Like other male statues of the Archaic period, its skin is painted reddish-brown. It stands 1.8 meters tall, and is dressed in a chiton with dark trim and a short cloak, advancing with the right arm outstretched and bent. Its left arm is angled toward the ground and may have held a bow.

The statues found at the Portonaccio sanctuary are created in the Ionic style that characterizes the Etruscan artistic culture of the late 6th century BCE. Its expression, an example of the "Archaic smile" that was popular at the time in both Greece and Etruria, has been interpreted as anything from serene, to aggressive, to downright cruel.

A striking aspect of the statue is its elaborate hairstyle, characterized by long, flowing tresses styled in an intricate arrangement of spiraling curls and secured by a ribbon. This hairstyle exemplifies the Etruscan fashion of the time, which favored lengthy, voluminous hair for both men and women, a trend that remained popular throughout Etruria in the late sixth century BCE.

== Reception ==
In 1920, photos of the Apollo were first released to the Italian public by the director of the Museo Villa Giulia. At that time, the popular belief was that Etruscan art was merely a primitive and less-polished derivative of the Greeks. The unveiling of the Apollo played a key role in the reevaluation of that idea, and of the Etruscans as a society.

The statue's artistic style, especially its pose and expression, sparked conversation among Etruscologists and enthusiasts of the time. Author Aldous Huxley interpreted the statue's smile in his short story After the Fireworks as being emblematic of a certain stability and sanity uprooted by the Great War. To him, the Apollo seemed to be laughing at the "divine absurdity" of the world. Author and historian Carleton Beals characterizes the Apollo as menacing and powerful due to the forward motion of its pose in the poem "The Apollo of Veii" for Broom: An International Magazine of the Arts in 1923.

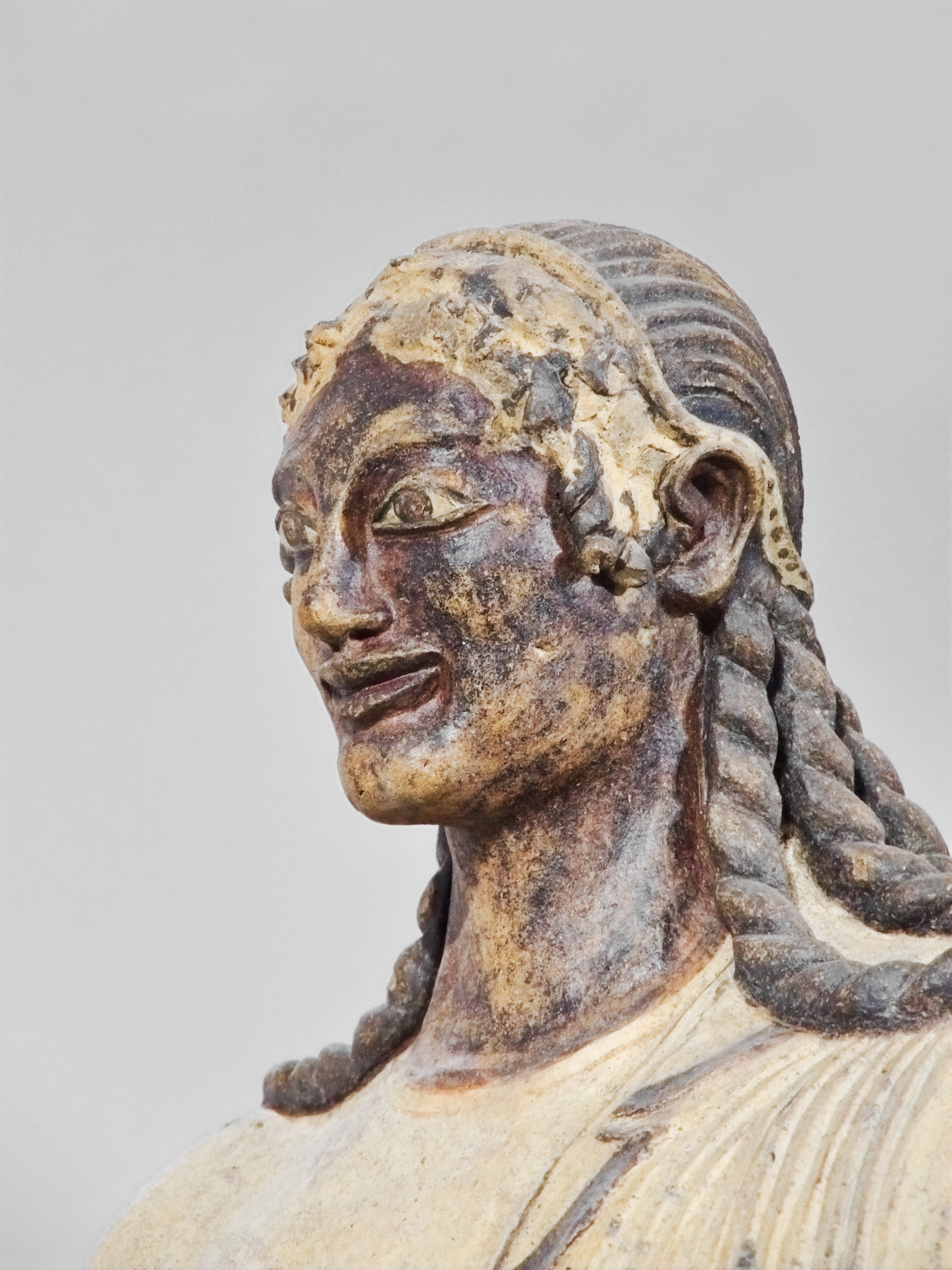

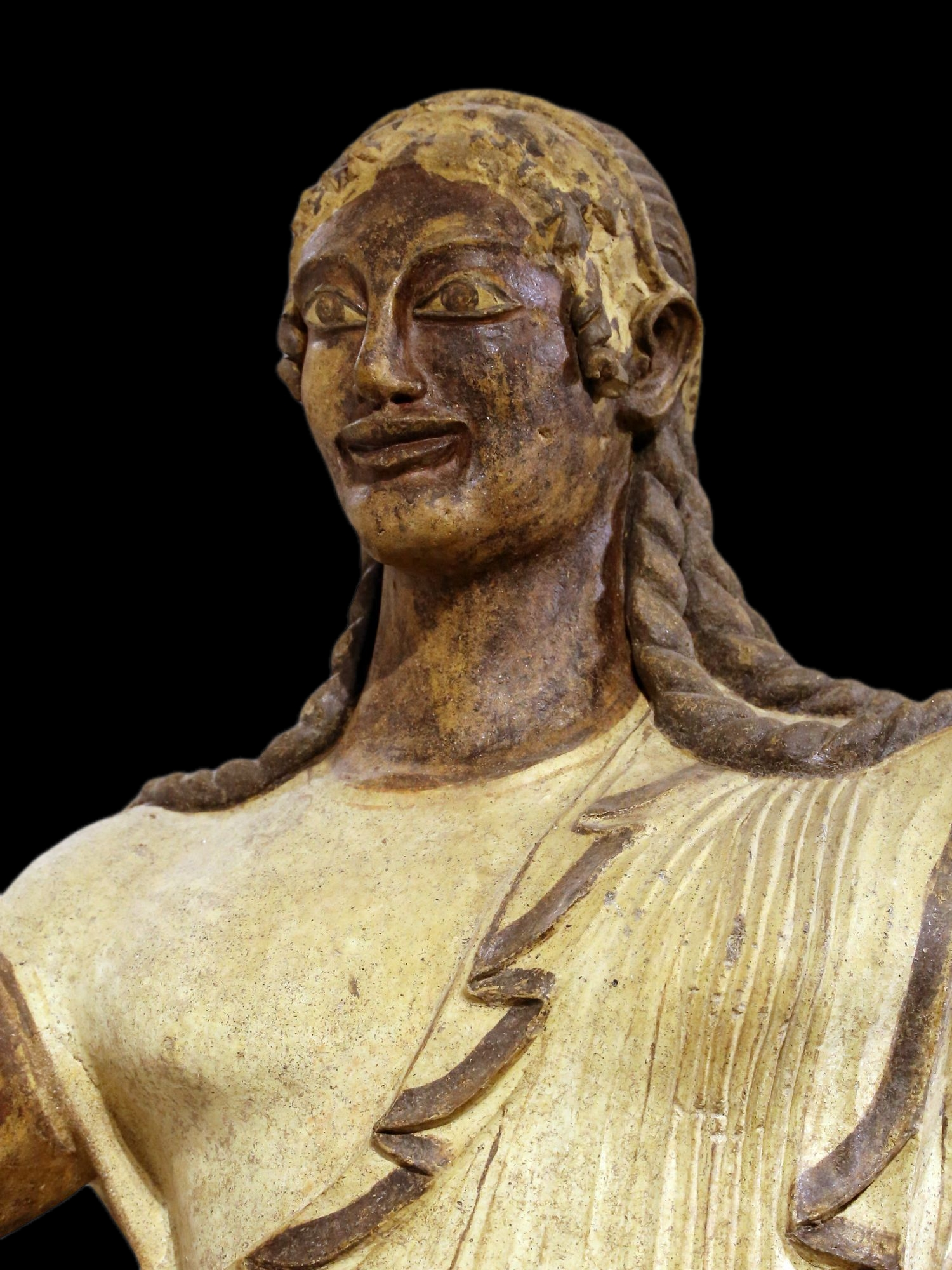

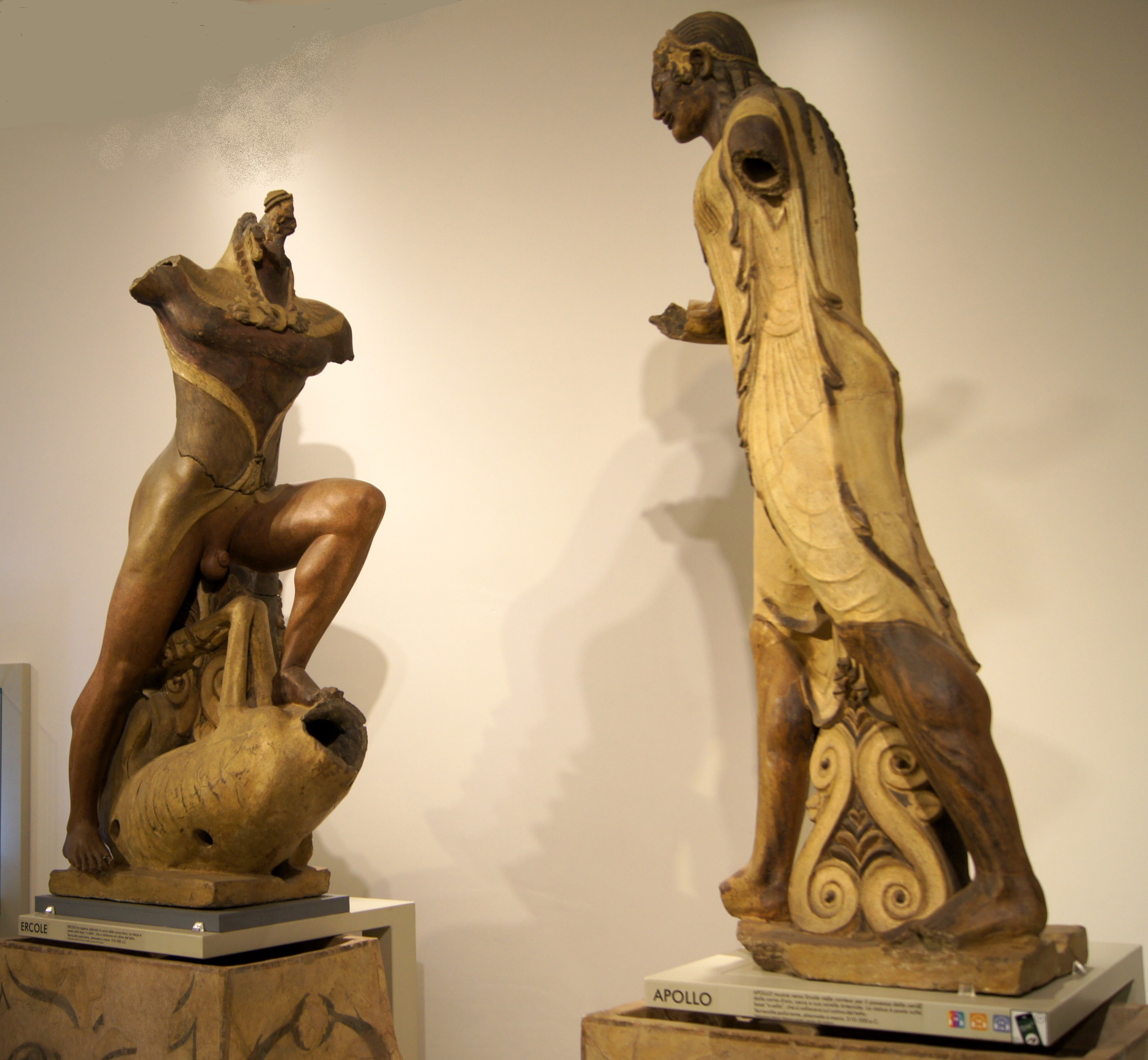

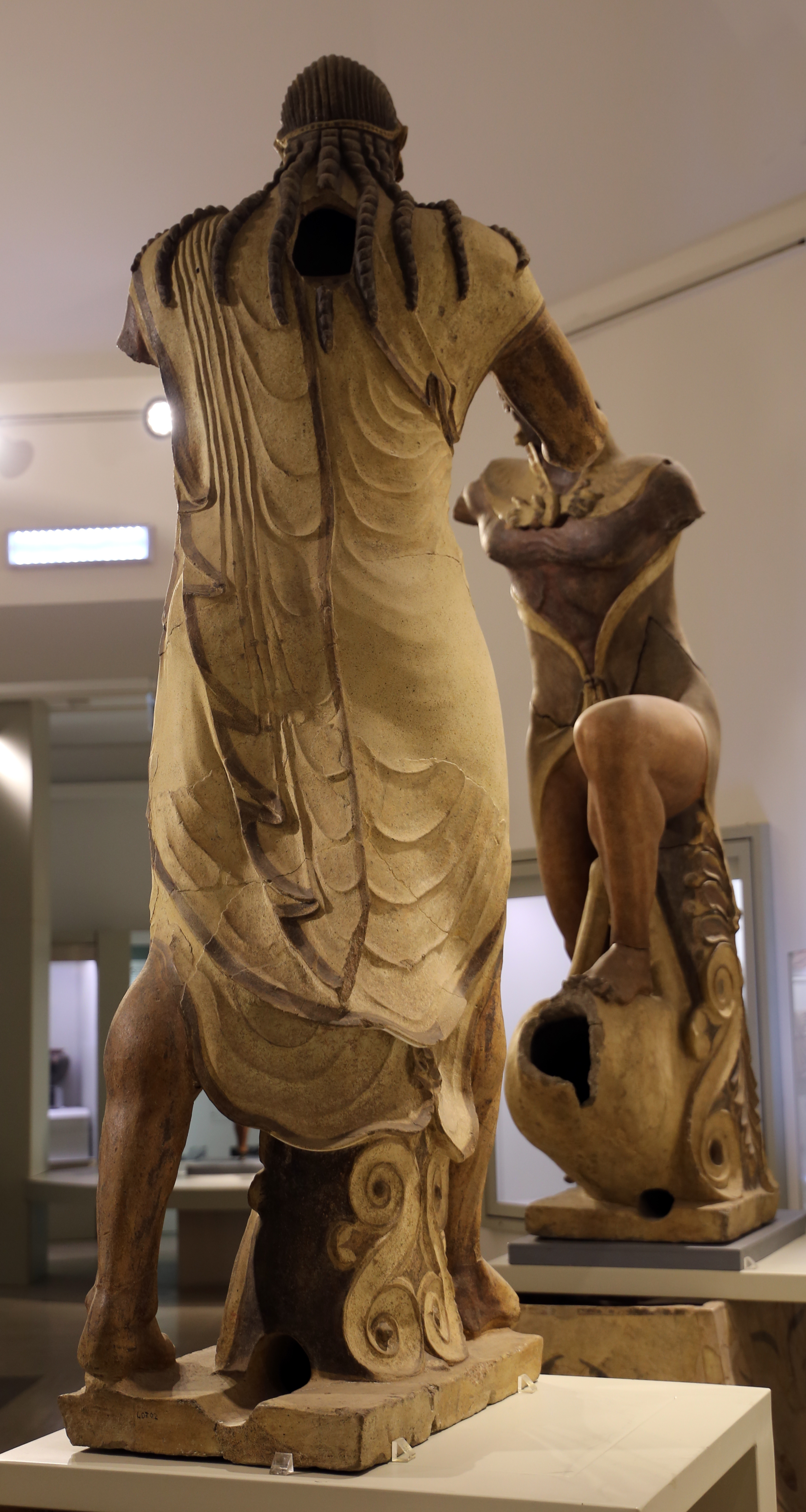

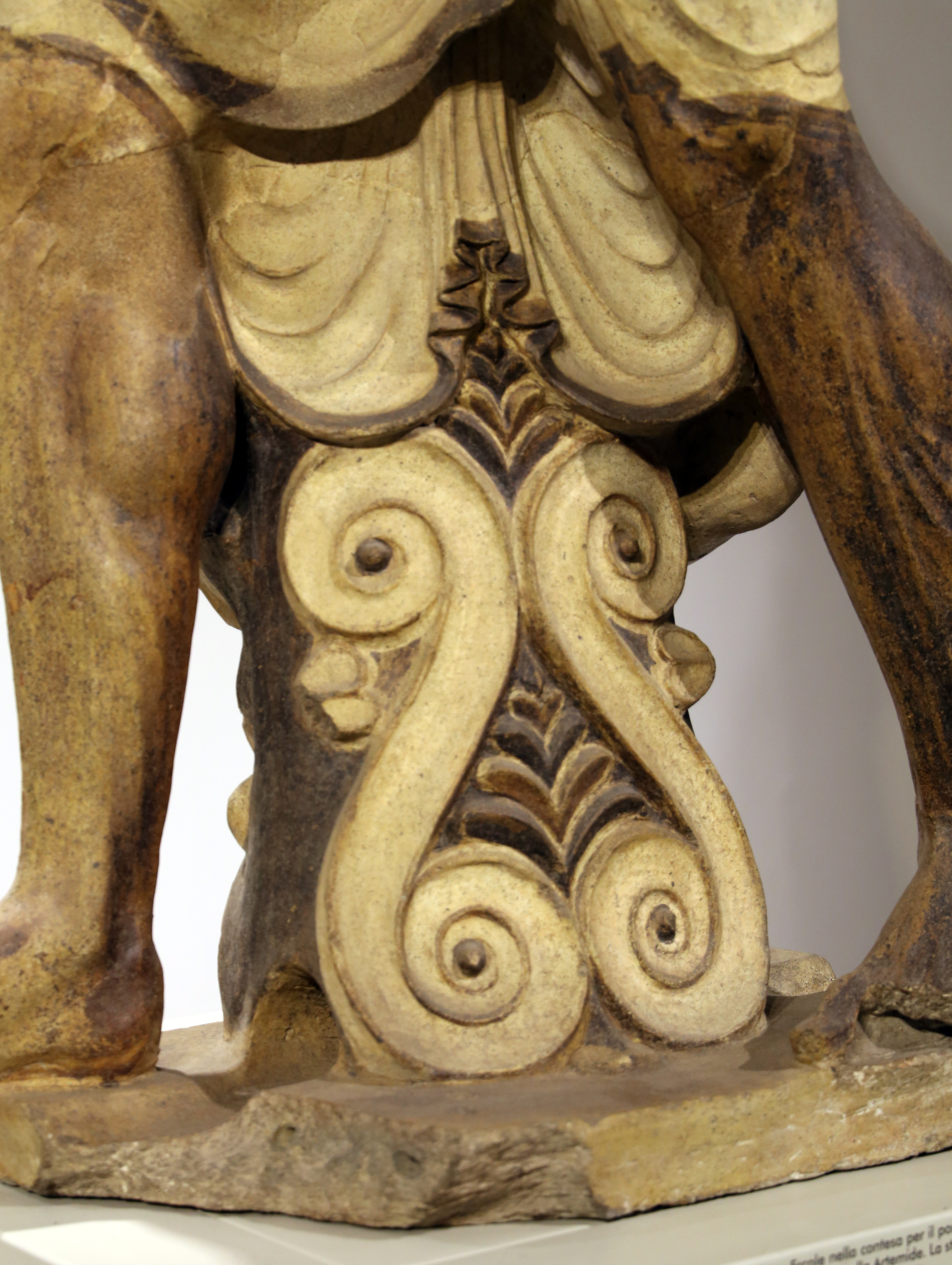

== See also ==
- Antefix
- Etruscan civilization
- Ornament (architecture)
- List of classical architecture terms

== Sources ==
- Spivey, Nigel (1997). Etruscan Art. London: Thames and Hudson.
