= Liguori =

Liguori may refer to:

== Places ==
- Liguori, Missouri, unincorporated community in Jefferson County, Missouri, United States
- Saint-Liguori, Quebec, parish municipality located on the Rouge River in the Regional County Municipality of Montcalm in Quebec
- Church of St. Alphonsus Liguori, Rome, church located on the Via Merulana on the Esquiline Hill of Rome, Italy

== People ==
- Liguori (surname), Italian surname

Given name

- Liguori Lacombe (1855–1957), Member of Parliament in the House of Commons of Canada
