= San Paolo Albanese =

San Paolo Albanese Shën Pali Arbëreshëve
- Comune
- Comune di San Paolo Albanese
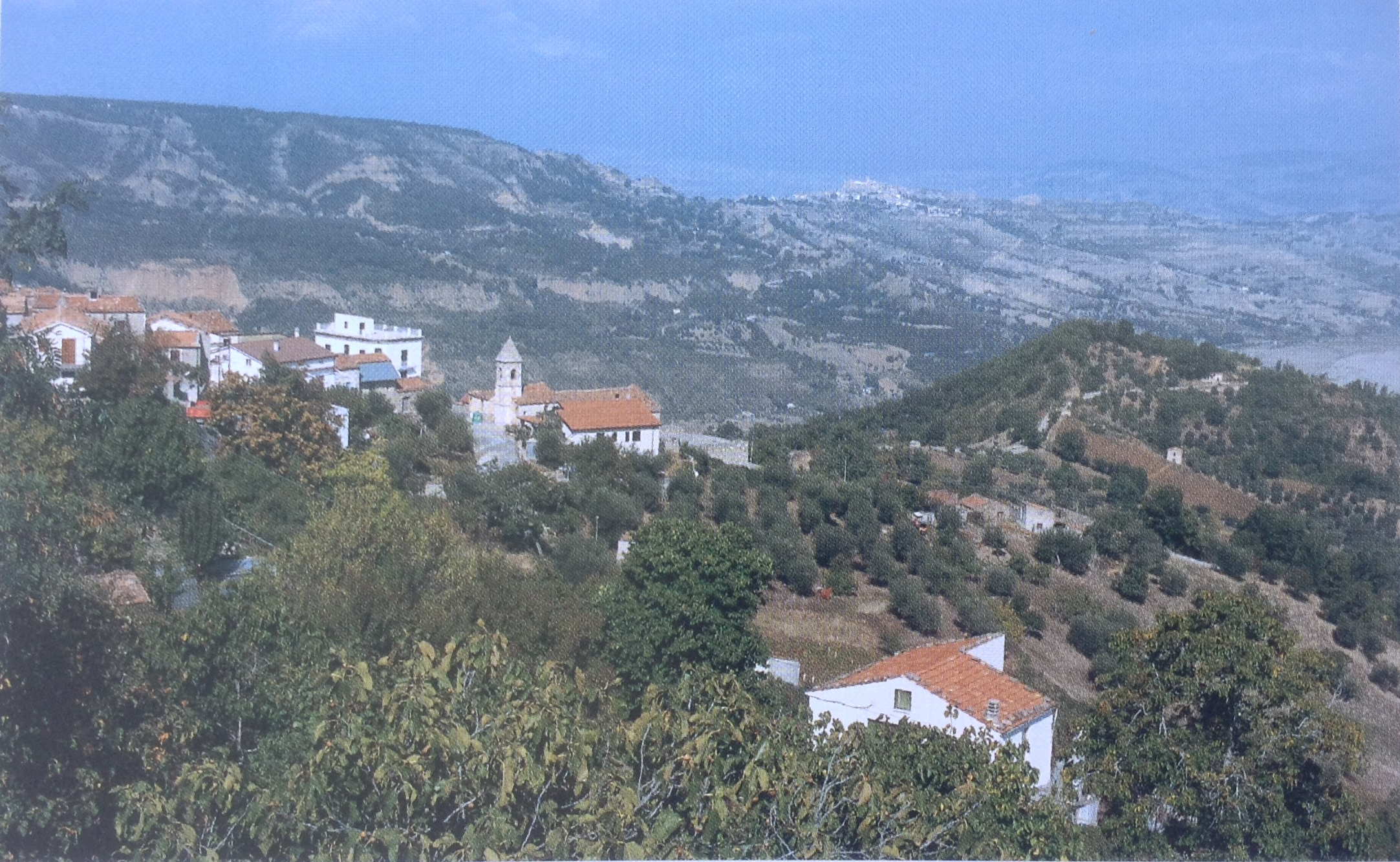
- View over San Paolo Albanese

- Location within Italy Location within Basilicata
- Coordinates: 40°2′N 16°20′E
- Country: Italy
- Region: Basilicata
- Province: Potenza (PZ)

Government
  - Mayor: Mosè Antonio Troiano

Area
  - Total: 30.22 km^{2} (11.67 sq mi)
- Elevation: 800 m (2,600 ft)

Population (2026)
  - Total: 197
  - Density: 6.52/km^{2} (16.9/sq mi)
- Demonym: Sanpaolesi
- Time zone: UTC+1 (CET)
  - Summer (DST): UTC+2 (CEST)
- Postal code: 85030
- Dialing code: 0973
- ISTAT code: 076020
- Website: Official website

San Paolo Albanese (Arbëreshë Albanian: Shën Pali Arbëresheve) is an Arbëreshë village and comune (municipality) in the province of Potenza in the region of Basilicata in southern Italy. With a population of 197, it is the least-populous municipality of Basilicata.

== History ==
San Paolo Albanese was founded in approximately 1534 by ethnic Albanians refugees or Arbëreshë, from Corone, Morea in Greece which was occupied by the Ottoman Turks.

In the early 1900s, the town and much of Southern Italy saw a wave of emigration to the United States and South America. Immigrants initially clustered in the New York Metropolitan Area but can be found distributed throughout the US.

The population dropped during the late 19th, and late 20th century from 1,430 in 1861, 968 in 1911, 911 in 1961, to 306 in 2011.

From 1936 to 1962, the village was called Casalnuovo Lucano.

With the opening of Albania in the last 20th century, Albanians again started coming to Italy. Politicians in the two countries have been working to build relationships between the communities.

== Geography ==
At an elevation of 843 metres (2,766 ft) and situated on the slope of Mt. Carnara 1,284 metres (4,213 ft) above sea level, San Paolo Albanese is the smallest municipality in Basilicata with an area of 29.9 square kilometres (11.5 mi^{2}).

It borders the municipalities of Alessandria del Carretto (in the province of Cosenza in Calabria), Cersosimo, Noepoli, San Costantino Albanese, and Terranova di Pollino.

It is also adjacent to Pollino National Park.

== Demographics ==
As of 2026, the population is 197, of which 45.7% are male, and 54.3% are female. Minors make up 6.6% of the population, and seniors make up 44.2%.

Historical population

Year	Pop.	±%
1861	1,430	—
1871	1,320	−7.7%
1881	1,088	−17.6%
1901	836	−23.2%
1911	968	+15.8%
1921	843	−12.9%
1931	880	+4.4%
1936	877	−0.3%

Year	Pop.	±%
1951	914	+4.2%
1961	911	−0.3%
1971	715	−21.5%
1981	624	−12.7%
1991	529	−15.2%
2001	416	−21.4%
2011	306	−26.4%
2021	220	−28.1%

Source: ISTAT

San Paolo is smaller than the neighboring Arbëresh village San Costantino Albanese, and is the least populated commune in the province.

The village saw a steady number of births and deaths through the 19th century, with a slight reduction in the death rate. The single largest year for deaths was 1835 when 120 people died. This was the first year of a Cholera epidemic on the Italian Peninsula which lasted three years.

=== Immigration ===
As of 2025, of the known countries of birth of 211 residents, the most numerous are: Italy (198 – 93.8%), Romania (4 – 1.9%), Albania (3 – 1.4%), Philippines (2 – 0.9%), Nigeria (2 – 0.9%).

== Culture ==
The Albanian language continued to be used as the primary language even after the establishment to the Foundation of Italy in 1870. During the 19th century, the dynamism of the Graeco-Albanian schools of Calabria and Sicily served to generate intense cultural development among the Albanian communities of southern Italy. Numerous Albanian intellectuals, for example, played an active part in the cultural renaissance of the southern regions of Italy and in the political movement of the Italian Risorgimento. The second half of the 19th century saw the creation of newspapers and magazines in Albanian.

The late 1950s marked the start of a certain cultural revival of Albanian, thanks to the founding of the Associazione Italiana per i Rapporti Culturali Italo-Albanesi, which published the journal Rassegna di Studi Albanesi from 1961 to 1963. Other cultural activities for the promotion of Albanian were the magazines Zgjimi, which disappeared in the late 60s, and Shêjzat, which was published from 1957 and 1974, the creation in 1969 of the Unione delle Comunità Italo-Albanesi and the founding of the Lega Italiana di Difesa della Minoranza Albanese in Cosenza in 1981, the celebration of the Settimane della Cultura Albanese in 1977, 1978, 1979 and 1981 and of the Prima Settimana della Cultura del Cossovo in Italia in 1980.

Today, however, Albanian in Italy has all the characteristics of the subordinate language in a diglossia situation. There is no organized Albanian cultural movement - apart from the AIADI (Associazione degli Insegnanti Albanesi d'Italia) - covering all of the areas inhabited by Albanian communities; cultural and linguistic initiatives always result from individual ideas which are subsequently supported by particular defenders of the language and certain local public authorities, ideas such as the literacy classes and courses in Albanian culture organized in some villages in 1987 by Education Office No 19 for Castrovillari with assistance from the EC.
