= Michele Scutari =

Italian–Arbëresh archpriest, poet, and patriot (1762–1830)

- Born: 7 October 1762; San Costantino Albanese, Basilicata, Kingdom of Naples
- Died: 11 August 1830 (aged 67); San Costantino Albanese, Kingdom of Naples
- Occupations: Archpriest, writer
- Known for: Albanian cultural nationalism, poetry, Albanian National Awakening

Michele Scutari (7 October 1762 – 11 August 1830) was an Arbëresh archpriest, writer and patriot.

== Life ==
Michele Scutari was born on 7 October 1762. His family was part of the Arbëresh community of San Costantino Albanese, in the Basilicata region. His paternal side's ultimate origin was from Shkodër (Scutari), while his maternal side's ultimate origin was from Himarë. He was an archpriest. The Arbëresh were the first to get involved in Albanian cultural nationalism in the early 19th century as part of the Albanian National Awakening. In this context, Scutari wrote about the differences between Albanian and Greek languages and nations, and argued that a Latin script was the most suitable for writing in the Albanian language. He also wrote poetry based on Arbëresh folk traditions. He died on 11 August 1830.
