= Vincenzo De Liguori =

Italian professional footballer

Personal information
- Date of birth: 5 October 1979 (age 47)
- Place of birth: Naples, Italy
- Height: 1.68 m (5 ft 6 in)
- Position: Midfielder

Youth career
- Juve Stabia

Senior career*
Years	Team	Apps	(Gls)
1997–2000	Juve Stabia	77	(2)
2000–2001	Ancona	0	(0)
2000–2001	→ Viterbese (loan)	26	(0)
2001–2004	Taranto	86	(3)
2004–2005	Benevento	32	(1)
2005–2008	Taranto	76	(4)
2008–2010	Benevento	63	(2)
2010–2013	Nocerina	81	(4)
2012	→ Barletta (loan)	9	(0)
2013–2014	Savoia	27	(3)
2014	Paganese	12	(1)
2015	Casertana	3	(0)
2015–2016	Nocera	24	(3)
Total		513	(22)
- * Club domestic league appearances and goals

Vincenzo De Liguori (born 5 October 1979) is an Italian former professional footballer who plays as a midfielder.

== Biography ==
=== Juve Stabia ===
Born in Naples, Campania, De Liguori made his professional debut in round 32 of 1996–97 Serie C1 for Campania team Juve Stabia.

=== Ancona ===
In August 2000 De Liguori was signed by Serie B club Ancona. In October he returned to Serie C1 for Viterbese.

=== Taranto ===
He was signed by Taranto Calcio in temporary deal in 2001. The contract was turned to co-ownership deal circa 2002. In June 2003 Taranto acquired De Liguori outright from Ancona. He also spent a season with Campania team FC Sporting Benevento in 2004–05 Serie C1, after Taranto relegated to Serie C2 in 2004 due to bankruptcy. De Liguori returned to Taranto (now as Taranto Sport) in 2005 as free agent, after the bankruptcy of Benevento. De Liguori won promotion playoffs with Taranto in 2006, brought the club back to Serie C1. In January 2008 De Liguori was signed by the Campania club again, now run as Benevento Calcio S.p.A.

=== Benevento ===
De Liguori spent 2 1/2 years in Benevento. The club was the losing side of promotion playoffs successively in 2008–09 and 2009–10 Lega Pro Prima Divisione. In 2010, he was signed by Nocerina, yet another Campania team. The team won promotion to Serie B in 2011 as the champion of group B of 2010–11 Lega Pro Prima Divisione. Nocerina relegated back to L.P. Prime Division in 2012. De Liguori also returned to that division in January 2012, for Barletta in temporary deal. De Liguori played his last game for Nocerina in 2013 promotion playoffs.

== Honours ==
- Supercoppa di Lega di Prima Divisione: 2011 (Nocerina)
- Lega Pro Prima Divisione: 2011 (Nocerina)
- Lega Pro Seconda Divisione: 2008 (Benevento)
