= Liborio Liguori =

Italian footballer

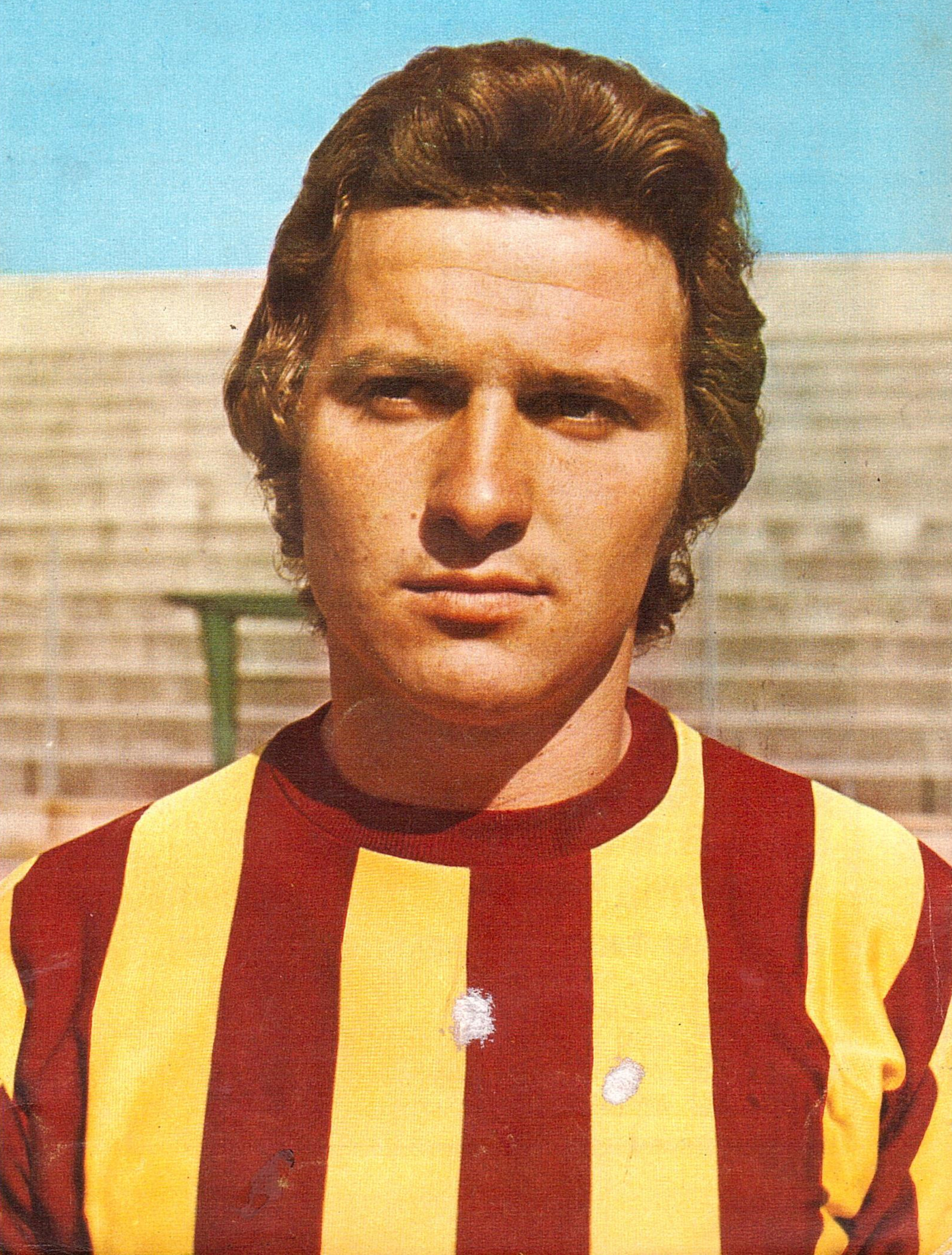
- Liguori with Roma in 1971

Personal information
- Date of birth: 24 February 1950 (age 76)
- Place of birth: San Costantino Albanese, Italy
- Height: 1.74 m (5 ft 8 1/2 in)
- Position: Defender

Senior career*
Years	Team	Apps	(Gls)
1969–1975	Roma	56	(4)
1970–1971	→ Reggina (loan)	1	(0)
1975–1976	Bari	9	(1)
1976–1977	Viterbese	8	(0)
- * Club domestic league appearances and goals

Liborio Liguori (born 24 February 1950 in San Costantino Albanese) is an Italian former professional footballer who played as a defender. He played 6 seasons (56 games, 4 goals) in Serie A for Roma.
