= Enrico Stefani =

Italian architect and archaeologist

Enrico Stefani (born 1869; died 1955) was an Italian architect and archaeologist working in Greece, Crete and Italy during the early twentieth century.

Stefani excavated in the Piazza d'Armi at Veii in 1917 and in 1919. In 1935, at Veii, Stefani directed the excavation of a tumulus-type tomb known as the Monte Tondo di Vaccareccia.

== Bibliography ==
- "Scoperte archeologiche nell’agro capenate", in "Bullettino di Paletnologia Italiana" XXXVIII, 1912, pp. 147–158
- "Veio, tempio detto dell’Apollo : esplorazione e sistemazione del santuario", in Atti della Accademia nazionale dei Lincei. Notizie degli scavi di antichità, 8.ser., 7 (1953), pp. 29–112.
- "Capena, scoperte archeologiche nell’agro capenate. Ricerche archeologiche nella contrada Le Saliere", in "Monumenti Antichi dei Lincei" XLIV, 1958, coll. 2–204.
