= Ettore Gabrici =

Italian archaeologist and numismatist

Ettore Gabrici (Naples, 23 November 1868 – Palermo, 28 January 1962) was an Italian archaeologist and numismatist.

== Biography ==
He attended the University of Naples, taking the courses of Giulio De Petra and graduated in 1889. For a few years thereafter he worked as an adjunct professor in grammar schools and in 1893 he was invited by De Petra to produce the catalogue of the coins in the Santangelo collection. From 1898 he had a position collaborating with the Naples National Archaeological Museum.

There Gabrici focussed in particular on numismatic research, publishing articles in the Rivista italiana di numismatica and attending the international numismatic congress which was held in Paris in 1900, where he gave a paper with the title "Le rôle de la numismatique dans le mouvement scientifique contemporain" (The role of numismatics in contemporary scholarship).

In 1901 he obtained the professorship of ancient history, though he continued to work with the archaeological superintendencies and with the Naples Museum until 1902.

From 1903 he worked at the National Archaeological Museum in Florence, returning to Naples in 1905. In 1907 he achieved the position of inspector. In 1910 he failed to become the director of the Naples National Archaeological Museum and in 1914 he took on duties to the Museo di Villa Giulia in Rome. The same year he successfully gained the position of director of the Palermo Archaeological Museum along with a teaching position at the university.

From this point he focussed his attention on the archaeological investigation of Sicily, particularly Selinunte, where he conducted excavations from 1915.

In 1926 he was nominated archaeological superintendent, continuing to work at Palermo. The next year he gained the chair of archaeology and art history at the University of Palermo, which he held until his retirement in 1939.

Even in retirement he continued his research, publishing works through the 1950s. From 1956 he was a fellow of the Accademia dei Lincei.

== Publications ==
- Topografia e numismatica dell'antica Himera (e di Terme), Napoli, 1894.
- "Pietrabbondante : ripostiglio di monete di bronzo antiche, della Campania, proveniento dal territorio di Bovianum Vetus" Notizie degli Scavi 1900.
- "Le rôle de la numismatique dans le mouvement scientifique contemporain", in Congrès international de numismatique…, Paris 1900, pp. 35–50.
- Ricerche di storia antica, 1902-4.
- "Monete inedite o rare del Museo nazionale di Napoli" in Corolla numismatica, London 1906, pp. 98–103
- "Bolsena: scavi e trovamenti fortuiti", in Notizie degli scavi, 1906, pp. 59–93
- "Bolsena. Scavi nel sacellum della dea Nortia sul Pozzarello", in Monumenti antichi dei Lincei, XVI [1906], coll. 169-240
- "Necropoli di età ellenistica a Teano dei Sidicini", Monumenti antichi dei Lincei, XX [1910], coll. 5-152)
- "Cuma", Monumenti antichi dei Lincei, XXII [1914], coll. 449-872
- "Selinunte: temenos di Demeter Malophoros alla Gaggera. Relazione preliminare degli scavi eseguiti nel 1915", in Notizie degli scavi, 1920, pp. 67–91
- La monetazione del bronzo nella Sicilia antica, Palermo, 1927.
- "Per la storia dell'architettura dorica in Sicilia", Monumenti antichi dei Lincei, XXXV [1933-35], coll. 139-250.
- "Riflessioni sul travaglio dell'arte figurativa contemporanea", Atti della Acc. di scienze lettere e arti di Palermo, s. 4, VII [1945-46], pp. 5–17
- "Contributo archeologico alla topografia di Napoli e della Campania", Monumenti antichi dei Lincei, XLI (1951), coll. 553-674
- Tecnica e cronologia delle monete greche Roma, 1951.
- "Studi archeologici selinuntini", Monumenti antichi dei Lincei, XLIII [1956], coll. 206-391.
- Problemi di numismatica greca della Sicilia e Magna Grecia, Napoli, 1959.
- (with Ezio Levi) Lo Steri di Palermo e le sue pitture, L'Epos, Palermo 2003.

== Bibliography ==
- Barbanera, Marcello (1998). "Ettore Gabrici". Dizionario Biografico degli Italiani, Volume 51: Gabbiani–Gamba (in Italian). Rome: Istituto dell'Enciclopedia Italiana. ISBN 978-8-81200032-6.
