= Notizie degli scavi di antichità =

- Discipline: Archaeology
- Language: English

Publication details
- History: 1876–present
- Publisher: Accademia dei Lincei

Standard abbreviations
- ISO 4: Not. Scavi Antich.

Notizie degli scavi di antichità is an Italian periodical dedicated to archaeology. It was founded in 1876 by archeologist and politician Felice Barnabei and is published by the Accademia dei Lincei.

Until 1885, the Notizie were not yet published as a separate journal, but as part of the Memorie della Classe di Scienze morali, storiche e filologiche of the Atti della Reale Accademia dei Lincei. However, offprints of the Notizie were also distributed in those years, but with a different pagination than the main publication in the Memorie. A concordance of the different paginations exists.
