= Vulca =

Etruscan sculptor

Vulca of Veii was an Etruscan artist from the town of Veii. The only Etruscan artist mentioned by ancient writers, he worked for the last of the Roman kings, Tarquinius Superbus (supposed to have died in 495 BC). He is responsible for creating a terracotta statue of Jupiter and a four-horse chariot for the Temple of Jupiter Optimus Maximus on the Capitoline Hill, as well as a terracotta statue of Hercules, known as the Hercules Fictilis ("clay Hercules") from its composition. Some have postulated that he also constructred the Apollo of Veii. His statue of Jupiter was reputedly painted with cinnabar and victorious Roman generals would paint their faces red in imitation during their triumphal marches through Rome. Pliny the Elder wrote that his works were "the finest images of deities of that era...more admired than gold."
