= Portonaccio =

Archeological site in Veii, Italy

Coordinates: 42°01′16″N 12°23′27″E

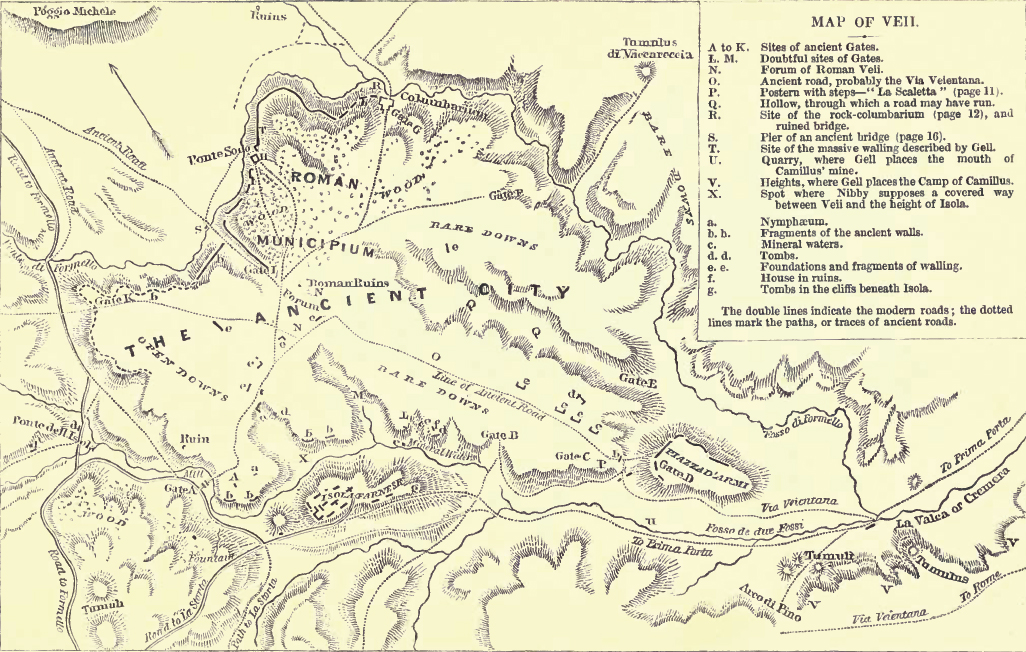
- Map of Veii

- Location within Lazio
- Type: Sanctuary
- Periods: Archaic period
- Cultures: Etruscan
- Location: Isola Farnese, Italy
- Region: Lazio

History
- Abandoned: late second century B.C.

Site notes
- Excavation dates: yes
- Archaeologists: Giovanni Colonna
- Condition: ruined
- Public access: yes
- Website: Il santuario di Portonaccio (in Italian)

The sanctuary of Minerva at Portonaccio is an archaeological site on the western side of the plateau on which the ancient Etruscan city of Veii, north of Rome, Italy, was located. The site takes its name from the locality within the village of Isola Farnese, part of Municipio XX, city of Rome.

It is important for the elaborate polychrome terracotta decoration that was found here with a quantity and quality unparalleled in Etruscan art, much of which can be seen in the National Etruscan Museum, in the Villa Giulia, Rome.

== The site ==
The sanctuary complex was built in the 7th century BC in a cutting on the side of the hill over which the city wall of Veii towered. One of the richest sources of Etruscan artifacts (pottery and other objects inscribed in Etruscan and terra cotta statuary and other decorative elements), it contained two main structures, one a sanctuary dedicated to the goddess Menerva (Etruscan spelling) and the other a temple that had statues of Turms, Hercle, Apollo (the Apollo of Veii) and Leto on the roof, which has come to be regarded as a temple of Apollo. Next to the temple of Apollo was a rectangular pool and a well provided water. The site has been left wooded, as it was in ancient times, when surrounded by a sacred grove and a wall.

The roof of the temple of Apollo has been restored on one side.

The site was excavated in modern times by Massimo Pallottino in the 1940s and published decades later by the first and second generation of his students.

=== Sanctuary of Minerva ===
The Portonaccio Sanctuary of Minerva was the first Tuscan–type, i.e., Etruscan, temple erected in Etruria (about 510 BCE). The reconstruction proposed for it in 1993 by Giovanni Colonna together with Germano Foglia, presents a square 60 feet (18 m) construction on a low podium (about 1.8 metres, considering the 29 cm foundation) and divided into a pronaos with two columns making up the facade between entrances, 24 feet (7.3 m) deep and a group in the back made up of three 30 feet (9.1 m) deep adjacent cells. The 21-foot (6.4 m) columns were made of stuccoed tuff as were the walls, which inside the pronaos were decorated with various paintings on clay panels. The roof was in wood covered with polychrome terracotta. The terracotta was placed through a refined system of syllabic abbreviations and they were integrated with bronze inserts and a generous profusion of plastic inserts, mostly modelled by hand, among which a splendid series of grand antefixes (joint coverings) with the heads of Gorgons, maenads and satyrs.

=== Temple of Apollo ===
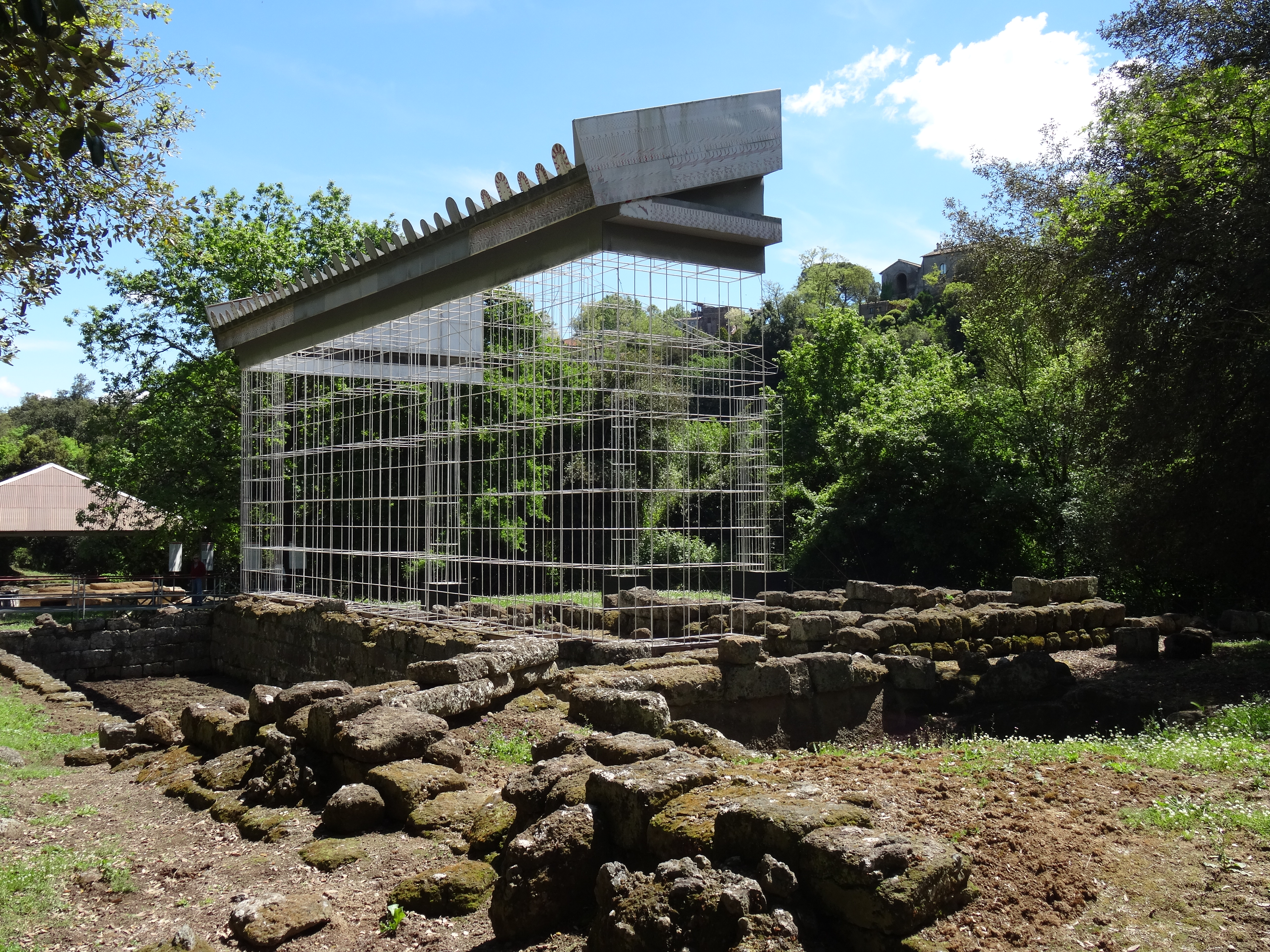
Temple of Apollo

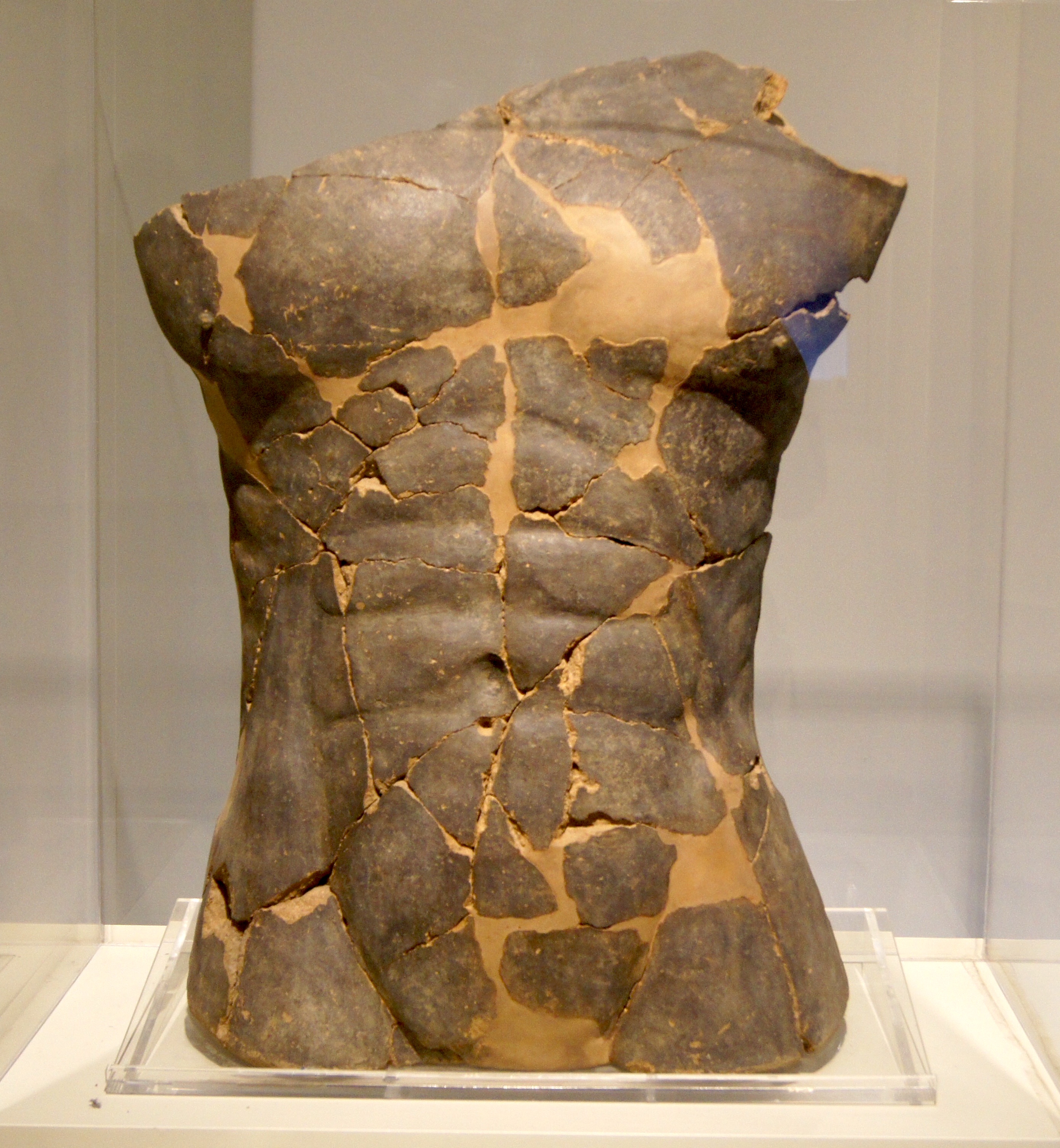
Huge male torso from the Temple of Apollo, probably Hercules, 550 BC

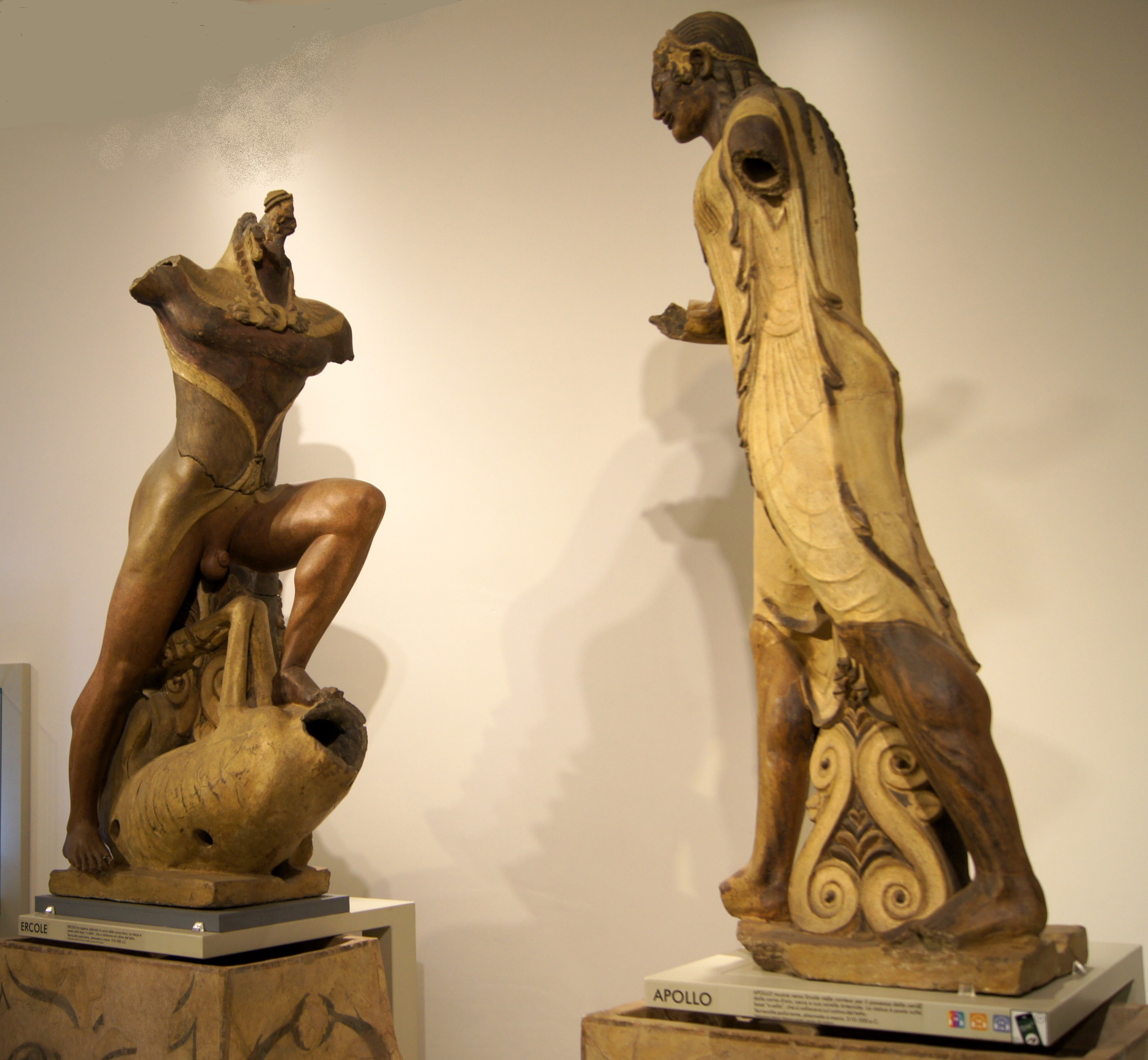
Terracotta statues of Hercules and Apollo from the temple of Apollo

This sanctuary, among the most ancient and venerated on all of Etruria, was outside of the city and on a road leading to the Tyrrhenian coast and the Veii salt flats. Its most ancient nucleus was tied to the cult of the goddess Minerva and a small temple, a square altar, a portico and stairs from the road were built in about 530-530 BC in her honour. The three-cell temple with the polychrome terracotta decorations was erected in about 510 BC in the western part of the sanctuary. Adjacent to the temple there was a great pool with a tunnel and a fence that enclosed the sacred woods. The temple was in honour of the god Apollo in his prophetic oracle aspect inspired after the Delphi model to which purification ceremonies were tied. Heracles, the hero-made-god, dear to tyrants and maybe also Jupiter — whose image we have to imagine on the central wall of the temple — were tied to Apollo.

By the middle of the 5th century BC, all work on the temple was complete and it began a slow decline while the structures sacred to Minerva were renovated on the eastern sector of the sanctuary. The starting up again of the cult worshipping Minerva, which continued also after the conquering of Veii by Rome (396 BC) is documented by a splendid series of votive statues of classic and late-classic style boys, such as the famous head, “Malavolta” as to indicate the important role of the goddess in the rituals of the passage from adolescence to adulthood that signalled the fundamental phases of the life of the members of the aristocratic families of Veii. In the 2nd century BC, the tuff mine that destroyed the central area of the sanctuary was opened causing damage to the temple and the sliding down of material downhill. The recovery of the fragments of the sanctuary determined the start up of excavations in 1914, which continued after the discovery of the famous statue of Apollo in 1916.

== Gallery ==
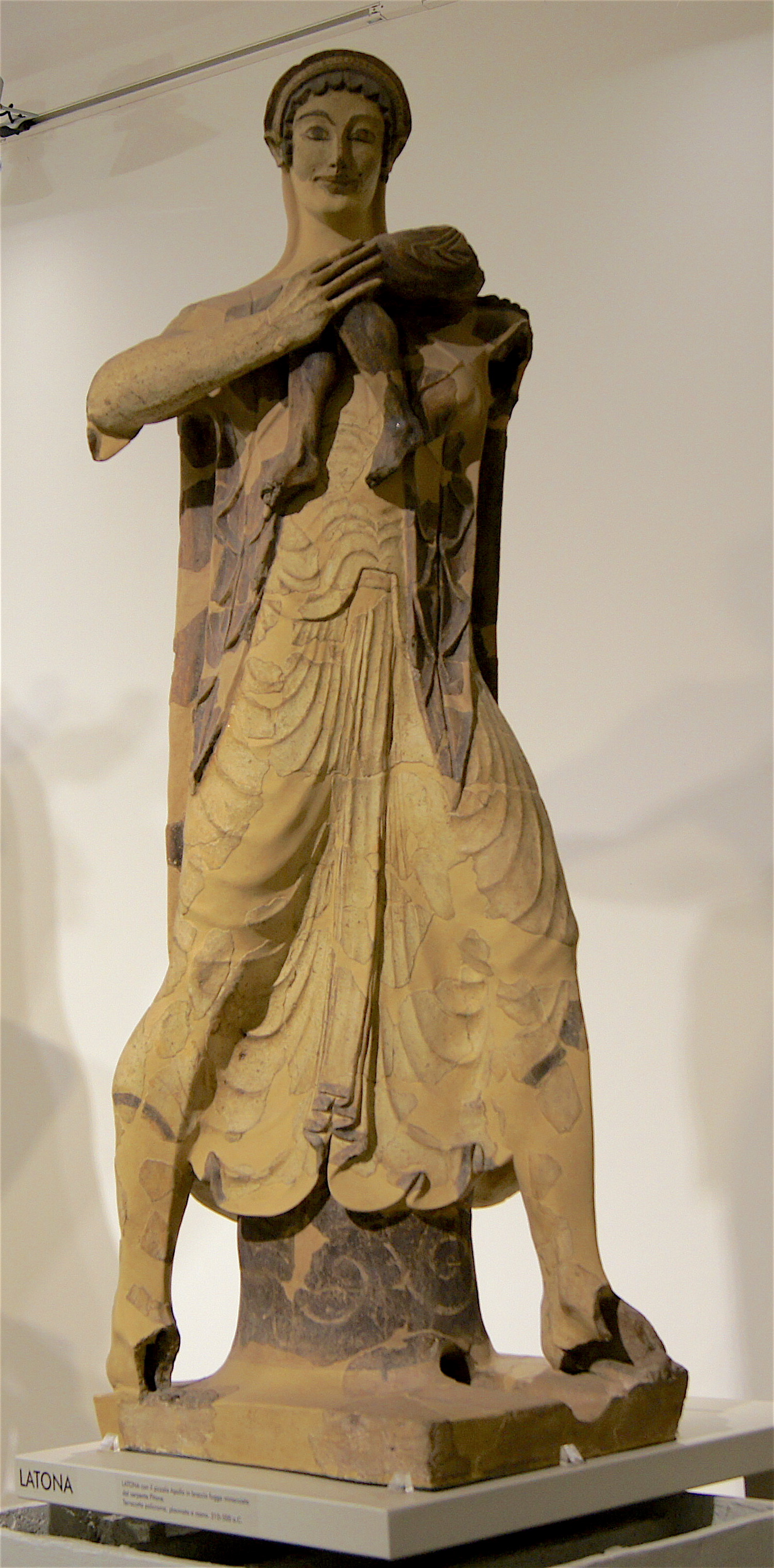
Goddess Leto (Latona) from the Temple of Apollo, Veii (Villa Giulia)

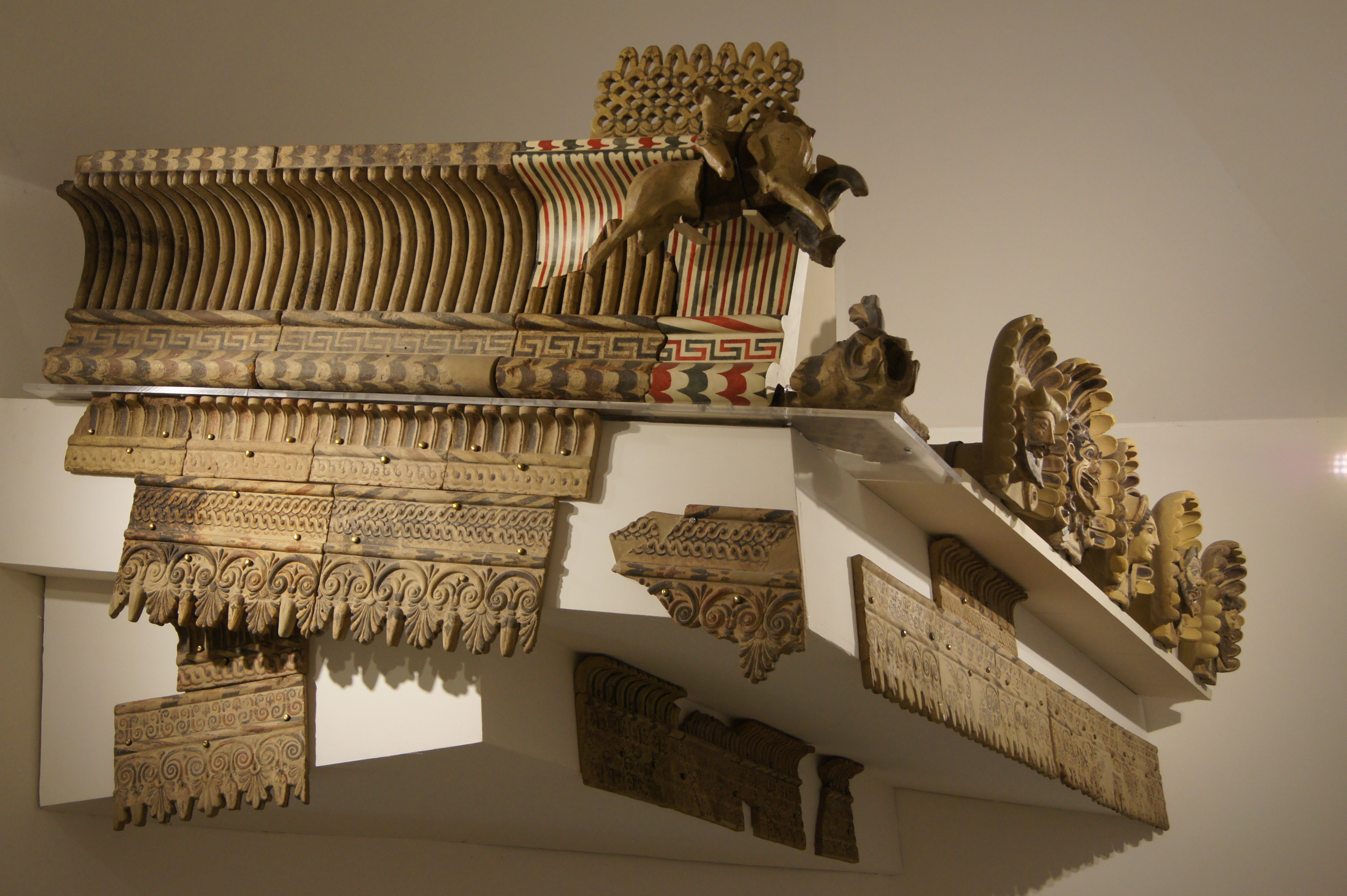
Terracotta architrave of the temple of Apollo, Veii (Villa Giulia)
