= Alessandria del Carretto =

- Comune
- Comune di Alessandria del Carretto
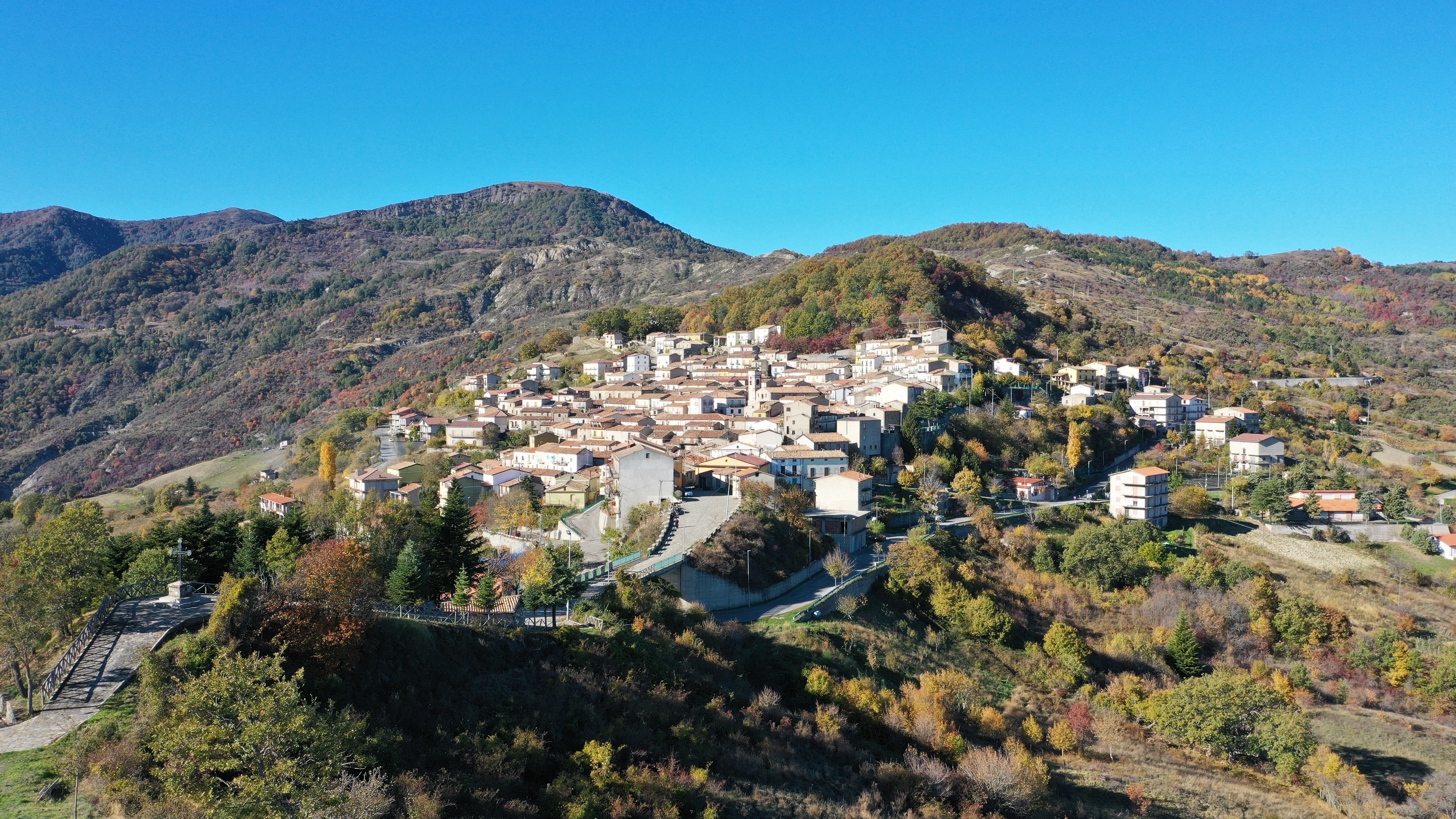
- Alessandria del Carretto panoramic town view

- Coat of arms

- Location of Alessandria del Carretto in Italy Alessandria del Carretto (Calabria)
- Coordinates: 39°58′N 16°23′E
- Country: Italy
- Region: Calabria
- Province: Province of Cosenza (CS)

Government
  - Mayor: Domenico Vuodo

Area
  - Total: 41.12 km^{2} (15.88 sq mi)
- Elevation: 1,005 m (3,297 ft)

Population (30 April 2017)
  - Total: 435
  - Density: 10.6/km^{2} (27.4/sq mi)
- Demonym: Alessandrini
- Time zone: UTC+1 (CET)
  - Summer (DST): UTC+2 (CEST)
- Postal code: 87070
- Dialing code: 0981
- Website: Official website

Alessandria del Carretto is a town and comune in the province of Cosenza in the Calabria region of Italy. Its territory is included in the Pollino National Park.

The documentary movie I Dimenticati by Vittorio de Seta was partly filmed in Alessandria del Carretto.

The movie Le quattro volte was also filmed in the town.
