= Villa d'Agri =

- Frazione
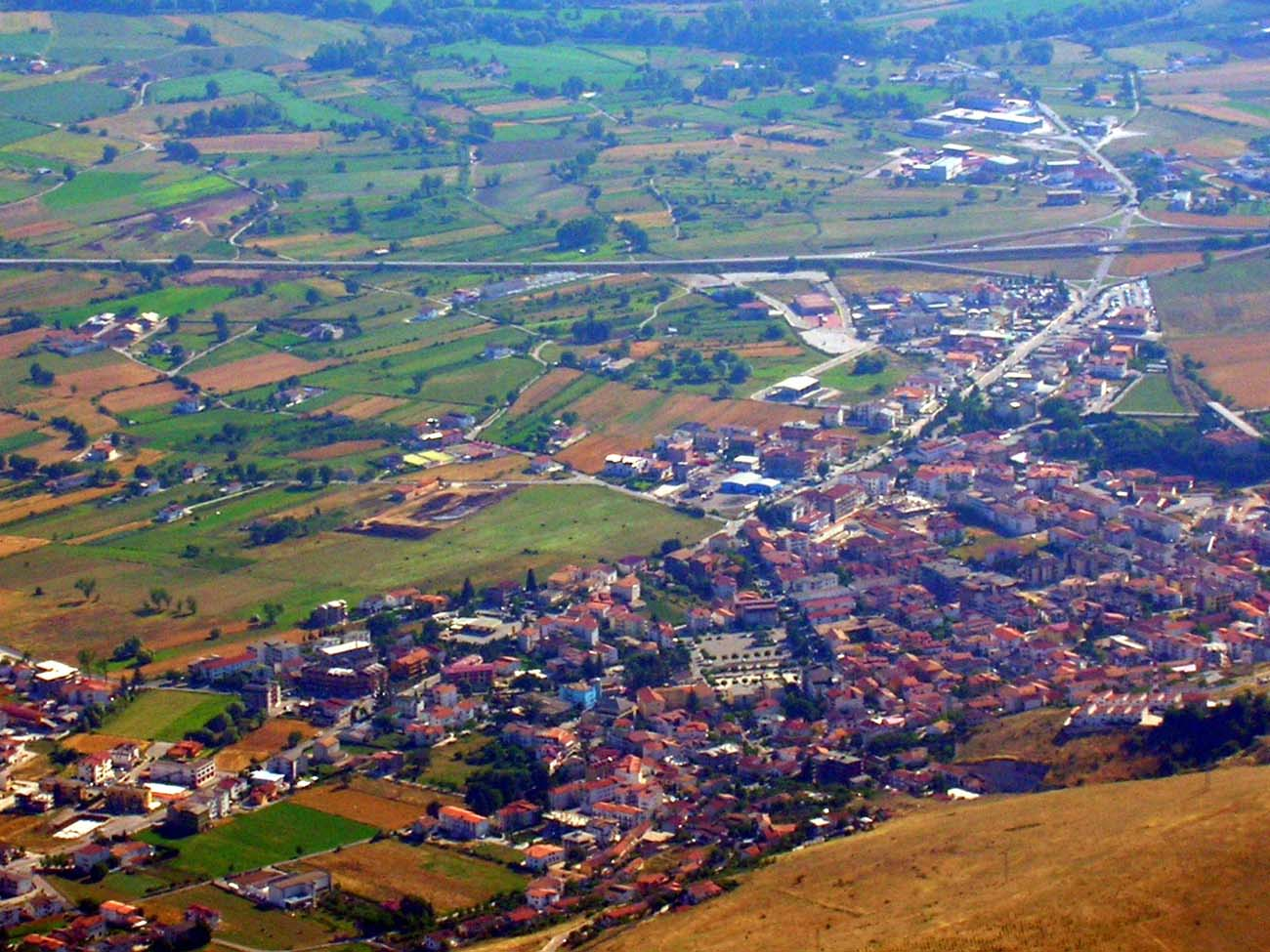
- Aerial view of Villa d'Agri

- Location of Villa d'Agri in Italy
- Coordinates: 40°21′15.34″N 15°49′39.72″E
- Country: Italy
- Region: Basilicata
- Province: Potenza
- Comune: Marsicovetere
- Elevation: 610 m (2,000 ft)

Population (2023)
  - Total: 3,595
- Demonym: villagresi
- Time zone: UTC+1 (CET)
  - Summer (DST): UTC+2 (CEST)
- Postal code: 85050
- Dialing code: 0975
- Website: Official website

Villa d'Agri is a village and civil parish (frazione) of the municipality (comune) of Marsicovetere in the province of Potenza, Basilicata, southern Italy. It has a population of 3,595, more than half of the entire municipality.

== History ==
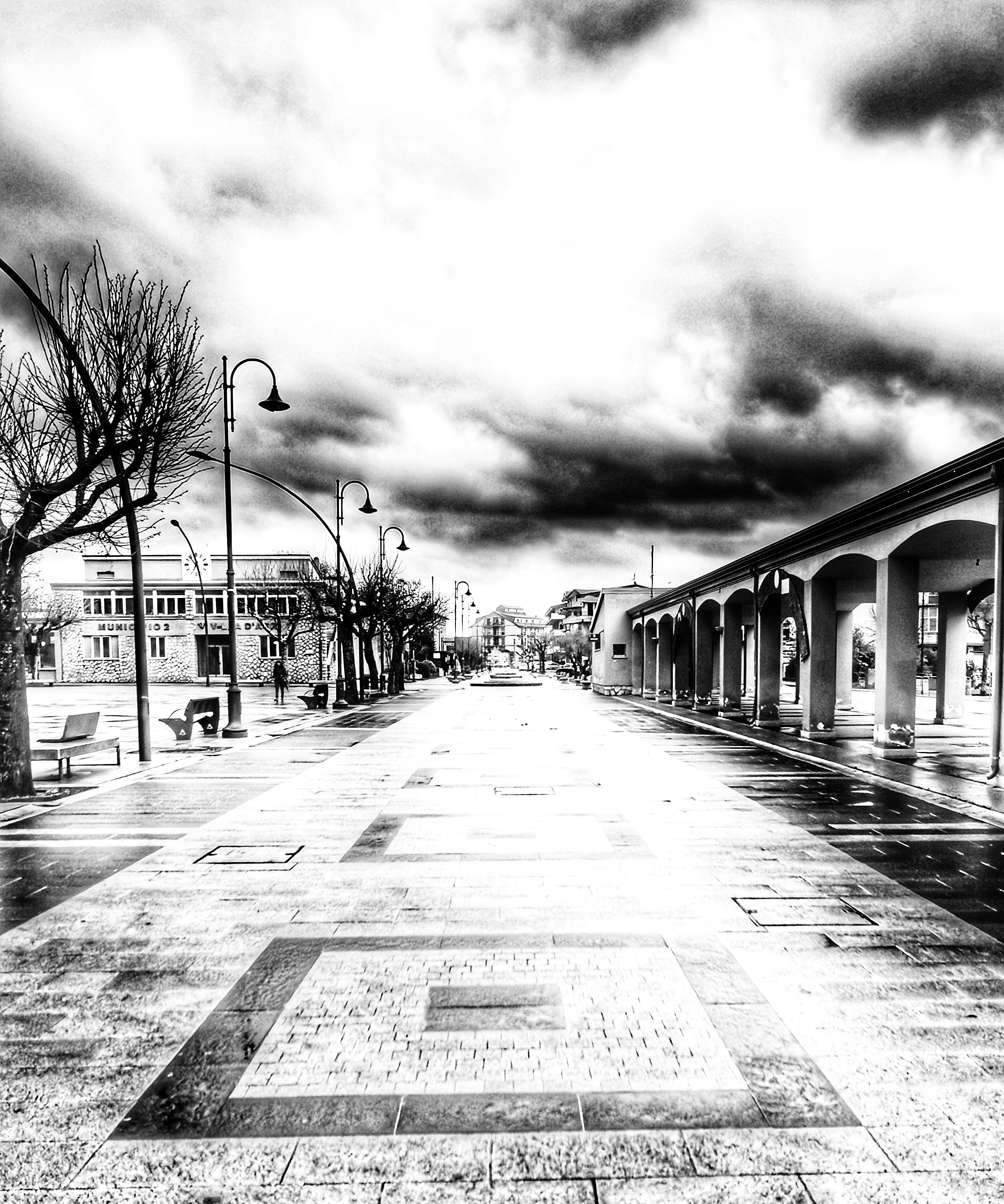
Porticos of Villa d'Agri

The modern village was founded on the site of the original and little frazione of Pedali, and changed its name during the 1950s, with a municipal resolution of January 18, 1995, followed by a Decree of the President of the Republic dated January 13, 1957. The beginning of development, both urban and demographic, coincided with the establishment of the Consorzio di Bonifica dell'Alto Agri, thanks to which new vehicular roads were built, the construction of rural aqueducts was increased, and the Agri River was regulated.

== Geography ==
Villa d'Agri lies on a plain, in the middle of the Agri Valley (Val d'Agri) and next to the eponymous river; 14 km east of the border between Basilicata and Campania, and 12 km north of Pietra del Pertusillo Lake. It is located downstream from Marsicovetere, from which it is approximately 1.5 km away. The other closest towns are Viggiano, Tramutola, Grumento Nova and Paterno. The main road is the "Strada Statale 598 di Fondo Valle d'Agri", an expressway with the exit "Villa d'Agri" located southwest of the centre.

== Main sights ==
To the north of the town centre stands, on the hillside, the Monastery of Santa Maria dell'Aspro, now in ruins, of early medieval origin. Other notable structures are the downtown's porticoes and the "San Pio da Pietrelcina" hospital, built in 1979.

== See also ==
- Lago di Pietra del Pertusillo
