= Basilicata Coast to Coast =

- Theatrical poster
- Directed by: Rocco Papaleo
- Written by: Rocco Papaleo, Valter Lupo
- Produced by: Isabella Cocuzza, Arturo Paglia, Mark Lombardo, Elisabetta Olmi
- Starring: Rocco Papaleo; Alessandro Gassmann; Paolo Briguglia; Max Gazzè; Giovanna Mezzogiorno
- Cinematography: Fabio Olmi
- Edited by: Christian Lombardi
- Music by: Rita Marcotulli
- Distributed by: Eagle Pictures
- Release date: 9 April 2010
- Running time: 105 minutes
- Country: Italy
- Language: Italian
- Box office: €3.4 million

Basilicata Coast to Coast is a 2010 Italian musical comedy film directed by Rocco Papaleo.

== Plot ==
Nicola Palmieri is a high school math teacher and music enthusiast. He leads a local band from Maratea whose other members include guitarist Salvatore Chiarelli, a medical student struggling to graduate; double bassist Franco Cardillo, a carpenter who has been mute since the death of the woman he loved; and percussionist Rocco Santamaria, Salvatore's cousin and a fading TV personality. The quartet signs up for the "Theatre-Song Festival" in Scanzano, naming themselves "Le Pale Eoliche" (The Wind Turbines). Nicola plans to cross Basilicata from the Tyrrhenian to the Ionian coast, suggesting they leave 10 days earlier to go on foot. They are followed by a local TV journalist named Tropea Limongi, reluctantly assigned to document their journey, though she eventually becomes fascinated by their experience. During their long trek, the group walks along little-known backroads, relying on a small wagon pulled by a white horse to transport supplies, instruments, and two tents. They also rehearse the songs they are going to perform at the festival, giving impromptu concerts in the small villages they pass through. Marked by highs and lows, the journey proves to be therapeutic, helping the four band members find the purpose in life they seemed to have lost.

== Cast ==
- Rocco Papaleo - Nicola Palmieri
- Alessandro Gassman - Rocco Santamaria
- Paolo Briguglia - Salvatore Chiarelli
- Max Gazzè - Franco Cardillo
- Michela Andreozzi - Lucia
- Giovanna Mezzogiorno - Tropea Limongi
- Claudia Potenza - Maria Teresa
- Gaetano Amato - Vincenzo Limongi
- Antonio Gerardi - Carmine
- Augusto Fornari - Rocco's press agent
- Antonio Andrisani - Priest
- Giovanni Andriuoli - Tropea's cameraman

== Production ==
The film was entirely shot in the Basilicata region. Principal locations include Maratea, Lauria, Tramutola, Aliano, Scanzano Jonico, Craco and Lago di Pietra del Pertusillo. It marked Papaleo's debut as a film director and the first acting experience for musician Max Gazzè.

== Reception ==
=== Box office ===
The film grossed €3.4 million.

=== Critical response ===
The film received mostly favorable reviews. The simple yet engaging plot, the setting, and the music were particularly appreciated by critics. Alberto Crespi of l'Unità called the film "well-acted, well-shot, and full of magnificent music," as well as "poignant, wandering, and emotional". Gianluca Ammone of Cinematografo noted a "lightness of spirit that wins you over, without overdoing it, trying to charm, or taking shortcuts". Maurizio Porro of Corriere della Sera described it as a "vital, likeable film, albeit somewhat wordy and didactic, but full of a genuine desire for cinema and storytelling". On a more critical note, Massimo Bertarelli of Il Giornale dismissed the film's plot and execution as "thin", complaining that "150 kilometers on foot is exhausting even for the viewer".

=== Accolades ===
| Award | Category | Recipient | Result | Year | Ref |
|---|---|---|---|---|---|
| Ciak d'oro | Best Soundtrack | Rocco Papaleo, Max Gazzè, Rita Marcotulli | Won | 2010 | |
| Globo d'oro | Best First Feature | Rocco Papaleo | Won | 2010 | |
| Globo d'oro | Best Comedy | Rocco Papaleo | Nominated | 2010 | |
| Nastro d'argento | Best New Director | Rocco Papaleo | Won | 2010 | |
| Nastro d'argento | Best Score | Rita Marcotulli | Won | 2010 | |
| David di Donatello | Best Directorial Debut | Rocco Papaleo | Won | 2011 | |
| David di Donatello | Best Score | Rita Marcotulli | Won | 2011 | |
| David di Donatello | Best Original Song | "Mentre dormi" by Max Gazzè | Won | 2011 | |
| David di Donatello | Best Film | Rocco Papaleo | Nominated | 2011 | |
| David di Donatello | Best Supporting Actress | Claudia Potenza | Nominated | 2011 | |
| David di Donatello | Best Sound | Francesco Liotard | Nominated | 2011 | |
| David di Donatello | Best Producer | Isabella Cocuzza, Arturo Paglia, Mark Lombardo, Elisabetta Olmi | Nominated | 2011 | |
| David di Donatello | Best Screenplay | Rocco Papaleo, Valter Lupo | Nominated | 2011 | |

== Remake ==
A South Korean remake, Blue Busking, was released in 2016.
