= Appennino Lucano - Val d'Agri - Lagonegrese National Park =

National park in Italy

Appennino Lucano Val d'Agri Lagonegrese National Park
- IUCN category II (national park)
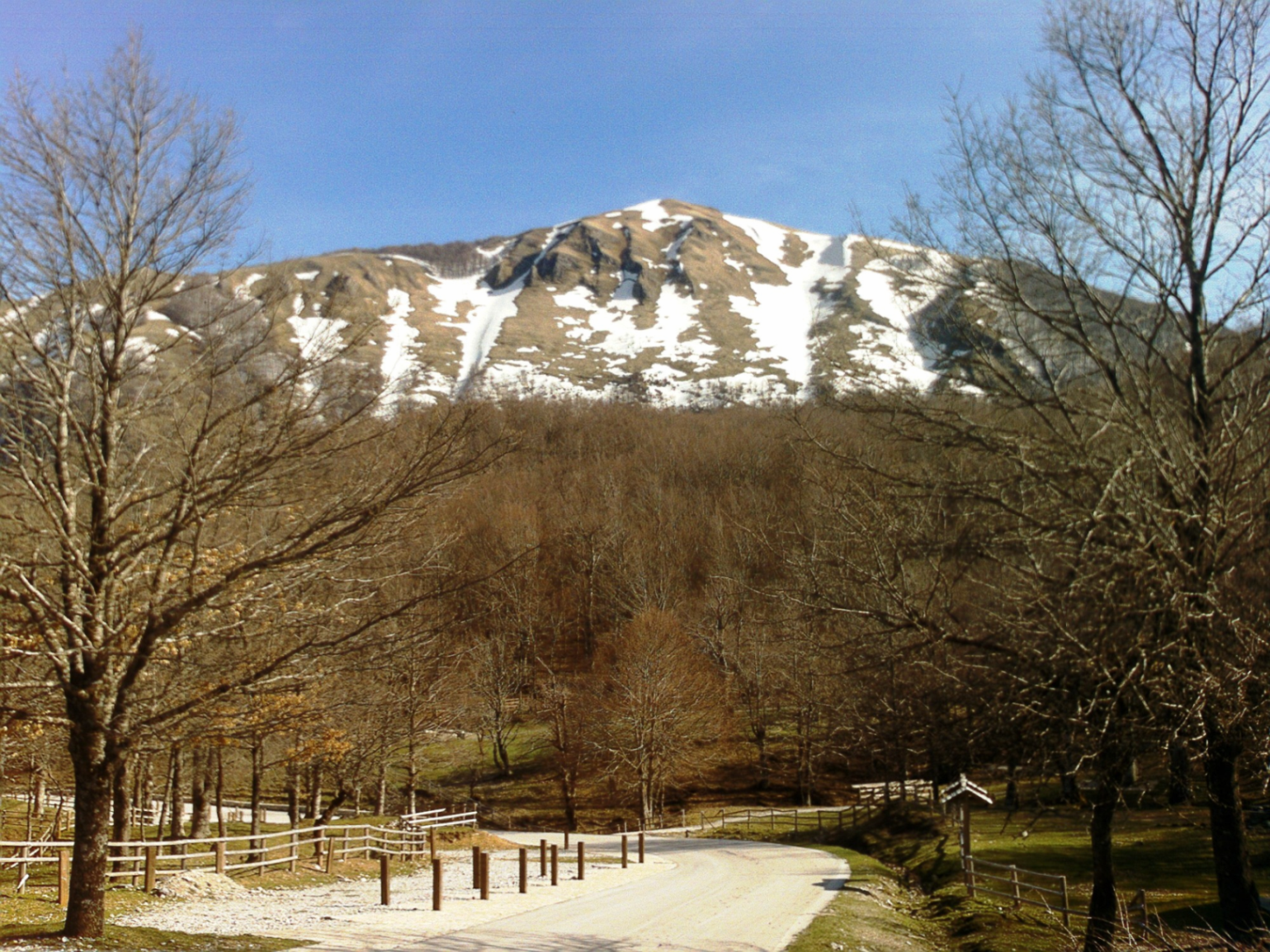
- A view of Monte Volturino.

- Location within Italy
- Location: Basilicata
- Nearest city: Marsico Nuovo
- Coordinates: 40°26′N 15°47′E
- Area: 689.96 km^{2} (266.40 sq mi)
- Established: December 8, 2007
- Governing body: Ente Parco Nazionale dell'Appennino Lucano-Val d'Agri-Lagonegrese
- Website: www.parcoappenninolucano.it

The Appennino Lucano - Val d'Agri - Lagonegrese National Park (Italian: Parco Nazionale dell'Appennino Lucano - Val d'Agri - Lagonegrese) is an Italian national park located in the province of Potenza of Basilicata region.

It was established in 2007 and its extension is close to 70,000 hectares.

Fauna include Italian wolf, wild boar and Eurasian otter along the Agri River.
