= Marsico =

Marsico may refer to two Italian municipalities:

- Marsico Nuovo, in the Province of Potenza (Basilicata)
- Marsicovetere, in the Province of Potenza (Basilicata)

== See also ==
- Marsica, geographical region of Abruzzo (Italy)
