= Giuseppe Truda =

Italian-Australian violinist & composer (1869–1904)

Giuseppe Antonio Truda
- Born: 5 July 1869; Viggiano, Kingdom of Italy
- Died: 6 January 1904 (aged 34)
- Occupations: Composer, violinist, conductor

Giuseppe Antonio Truda (5 July 1869 – January 1904) was an Italian-born Australian composer.

He trained as a musician since childhood, and he started his professional career in London at the age of 15. At the age of 16, he was selected by an Australian impresario to join an Italian Opera company touring Australia. He returned to Australia in 1888 for professional reasons, and continued working there until 1891. Following a few years of absence, he returned to Brisbane in 1894. In 1897, he staged the first of his own annual concerts at the Centennial Hall. The Commonwealth of Australia was formed on 1 January 1901, and Truda quickly applied for citizenship. He was listed in the Australian Electoral Roll in 1901.

== Biography ==
=== Early life and education (1869–1888) ===
Truda was born on 5 July 1869 in Viggiano. His parents were Antonio Truda and Anna Maria Solari, who were married in 1866. He had two brothers. His father and younger brother died in 1874.

From the 19th century or before, it was common in Viggiano for children to learn the violin, harp or the flute at a young age. They would grow up to travel the world as musicians to earn their living. Those who showed talent went on to study at the Conservatorio di Musica San Pietro e Majella in Naples or their other campus the Conservatorio di Salerno. Truda was one such student and at the age of nine went on to study at the Salerno. Later he would also study at the Naples conservatory.

An interview with Truda reported in The Queenslander in 1896, Truda said that he was playing first violin in the at the age of fourteen and a year later went on to London to earn a living. At the age of sixteen, he was selected by Australian impresario Martin Simonsen to join his Italian Opera company touring Australia.

=== Career (1888–1902) ===
In July 1888, he married Amalia Scolastica Assunta Pricolo from Tramutola, a neighboring village to Viggiano. Amalia's aunt, Isabella had also married a Truda, Pasquale, and together they had nine boys, eight of which had migrated to Australia and New Zealand and formed Truda Bros bands or ensembles both in Australia and New Zealand. In between engagements, as musicians, they earned their living teaching students of the harp, violin and flute.

Truda returned in Australia in September 1888 playing first violin with the opera companies of Martin Simonsen and Caron and Adson. He was also engaged for several personal engagements and other concert appearances. He must have received his first level of acclaim and popularity with Brisbane audiences during that time as a Grand Farewell Concert was held for him at the Centennial Hall on 6 July 1891.

On his return to Italy, he continued his studies at the Conservatorio di Musica San Pietro e Majella in Naples. His first son, Antonio was born in Viggiano in March 1893. Antonio would later follow his father's footsteps into the musical world as a talented violinist also. Truda gained his accreditation as a professor of music whilst at the Conservatorio and returned to Brisbane early in 1894 for the start of the school year. He immediately started advertising for pupils and other musical engagements.

The first of his compositions to be published was The Emilia Gavotte which was published by Messrs. Nicholson and Co. The piece, dedicated to Mrs D'Arcy Irvine, a well-known society figure of the time, received favourable reviews in The Week (16 November) and The Telegraph (14 November). No copies of this music have survived.

Truda performed at the Liedertafel Concerts as leader of the orchestra, Smoke Concerts and Promenade Concerts. Regular engagements to perform at private society functions cemented his popularity as a performer and teacher. The article "Men we Meet" was reprinted in newspapers across the country.

In 1897, he staged the first of his own annual concerts at the Centennial Hall. From the very beginning these concerts were anticipated with great enthusiasm from the critics and audiences who were rarely disappointed by the actual performance. A cast of local and international performers such as Italian opera stars Signor and Signora Rebottaro and Miss Marie Narelle were amongst the guest performers.

1897 was also the year that the Queensland International Exhibition was held and this provided almost daily opportunities for Truda, and his troupe, to perform. He was one of the more popular performers at the exhibition and further solidified his position as a major influence locally and interstate. He was presented with a gold medal for his services to mark the end of the season of the Exhibition.

Truda's only composition that survived him was the May Queen Waltz. It was performed for the first time in over 100 years at a concert in Melbourne in 2013, titled Musical Migrants

Truda and Mr H. Benham formed the Brisbane Amateur Operatic Society in 1899 and invited Brisbane professional and amateur musicians to join them. The first performance was scheduled to be The Pirates of Penzance and according to the newspapers of the time it was a huge success. The following year the society performed Les cloches de Corneville. Truda was presented with a gold baton for his "arduous and enthusiastic" efforts towards the success of the company.

The Commonwealth of Australia was formed on 1 January 1901 and Truda, keen to show his loyalty to the country who had served him so well, quickly applied for citizenship. He was listed in the Australian Electoral Roll in 1901.

In 1901 members of the musical fraternity in Brisbane formed the Brisbane Orchestral Society with Truda as the founding conductor. That year he also performed as leader of the orchestra for the Civil Concert for the Duke and Duchess of Cornwall and York on their federation visit to Australia.

=== Late-life illness and legacy (1902–1904) ===
Truda was at the pinnacle of his career. His pupils were doing well in their Trinity College London examinations and he was receiving critical and popular acclaim for his performances. In October of that year, he started showing symptoms of being ill. By early 1902, his illness was showing no sign of improvement and his friend Dr W. S. Byrne, a physician and amateur musician suggested that he return to Europe to take treatment in Leipzig.

The family, which now included his wife Amalia and four children planned to return to Italy on 2 April 1903. A Grand Farewell Concert in his honour was held prior to his departure. It was at this concert that his son Antonio at eight years old made his appearance on the stage as a violin soloist.

The family had hoped to be in Europe for approximately a year during which time Giuseppe would take a cure in Leipzig and young Antonio would commence studies at the conservatorium in Naples where his father and cousins had studied before him. As it turned out, the Giuseppe was not well enough to return to Australia until late 1903.

Brisbane welcomed his return in December 1903 and he made his first appearance at St Mary's Church on 6 December. He took ill again and the news of his death was announced on 6 January 1904 in The Telegraph. A eulogy was published in The Queenslander on the 16 January. Both articles were copied in newspapers around the country.
