= Music of Basilicata =

The music of Basilicata is sparse at the moment. There is little theatrical or staged musical tradition, and the facilities have not yet fully recovered from the 1980 Irpinia earthquake. Yet, the area has some interesting things to offer musically.

== General comments ==
Basilicata gave the birth to Obadiah the Proselyte, a nobleman cited as the first composer who transcribed notations of synagogal chant, which are the oldest discovered to date.

The most famous classical composers from Basilicata are Carlo Gesualdo, considered one of the greatest madrigalists of the Renaissance era, and Egidio Duni, who gained international notoriety, mainly in France.

Basilicata's international musical heritage includes a large group of itinerant musicians who, beginning in the early 1860s, immigrated across the world, in Paris, New York, London and Ottawa. Many of these musicians continued performing and brought their folk traditions with them.

Famous itinerant musicians, mostly harpists, flautists and violinists, were originally from Viggiano, province of Potenza, who reached important positions in the worldwide music scene, especially in the United States. The most important musician of the era was probably Leonardo De Lorenzo, flautist of many international orchestras and music educator at the Eastman School of Music. Another prominent musician Carlo Curti, popularized the mandolin in American music and created one of Mexico's oldest orchestras, the Mexican Typical Orchestra, which is considered the "predecessor of the Mariachi bands."

Modern musicians from the region include pop singers Mango and Arisa and mezzo-soprano Anna Bonitatibus.

== Musical venues and activities ==
Matera is one of the most interesting sites in the world in terms of urban archaeology, the area is the site of the Sassi cave dwellings, a mountainside of dwellings originally dug out as caves. The city is in the midst of making the area more hospitable to tourists and injecting cultural and musical activity. The newer, modern city of Matera (away from the caves) hosts the Teatro Egidio Romualdo Duni, the site of regular concert season put on by the Matera Provincial Orchestra. The city also has the Duni music conservatory.

The Francesco Stabile theater is the main opera house in the Potenza area and was opened in 1881 with a presentation of Traviata. The theater was built to be a smaller replica of Naples' San Carlo opera house. It was damaged by the quake of 1980, but was rebuilt and reopened in 1990. It has a regular season of opera as well as classical music concerts. The city is also the site of the Gesualdo da Venosa music conservatory, which boast a modern 500-seat auditorium. The Stabile Association sponsors an annual summer music festival called Festainmusica.
