= Marsicovetere =

- Comune
- Comune di Marsicovetere
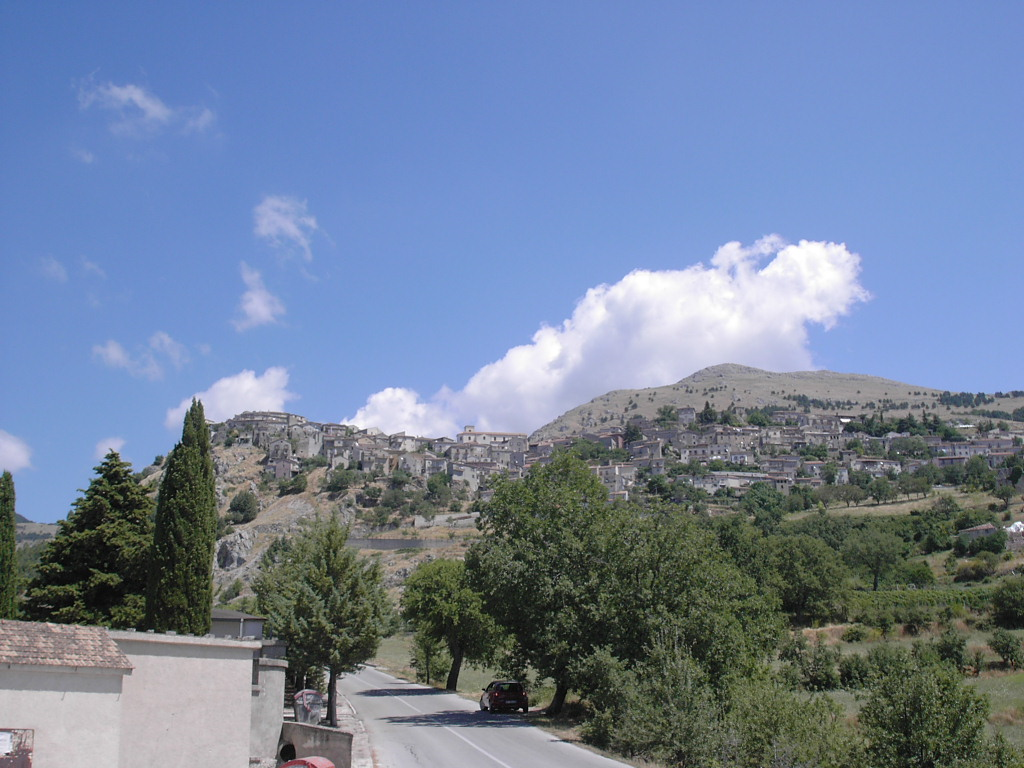
- View of Marsicovetere

- Location within Italy Location within Basilicata
- Coordinates: 40°22′N 15°50′E
- Country: Italy
- Region: Basilicata
- Province: Potenza (PZ)
- Frazioni: Barricelle, Villa d'Agri

Government
  - Mayor: Marco Zipparri

Area
  - Total: 37.82 km^{2} (14.60 sq mi)
- Elevation: 1,037 m (3,402 ft)

Population (30 September 2017)
  - Total: 5,543
  - Density: 146.6/km^{2} (379.6/sq mi)
- Demonym: Marsicoveteresi
- Time zone: UTC+1 (CET)
  - Summer (DST): UTC+2 (CEST)
- Postal code: 85050
- Dialing code: 0975
- ISTAT code: 076046
- Patron saint: St. Bernardino of Siena
- Saint day: May 20
- Website: Official website

Marsicovetere (Lucano: Marsëcuvètrë) is a town of and comune in the province of Potenza, in the Southern Italian region of Basilicata.

== Geography ==
It is bounded by the comuni of Calvello, Grumento Nova, Marsico Nuovo, Paterno, Tramutola and Viggiano.

Historically important is the historic center, the old Marsicovetere, although the most population resides today in Villa d'Agri, a hamlet (frazione) representing the new part of the town, at 600 metres (2,000 ft) of elevation. The other municipal hamlet is Barricelle.

== History ==
Marsicovetere was an ancient city of the Marsi in the Agri River valley, later conquered by the Romans. In the year 1000 it was seat of a county. In 1498 King Frederick IV of Naples donated it to the Caracciolo family, who held it until 1777 save a brief parenthesis under the Di Palmas. In 1860 it was annexed to the Kingdom of Italy.

== See also ==
- Villa d'Agri
