= Lago di Pietra del Pertusillo =

Lake in Basilicata, Italy

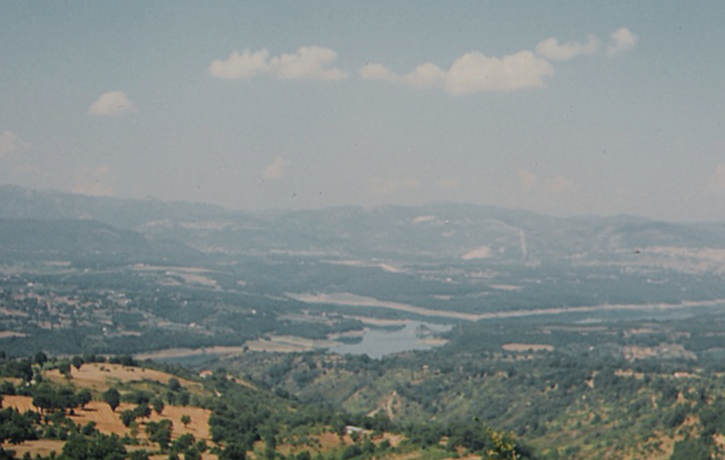

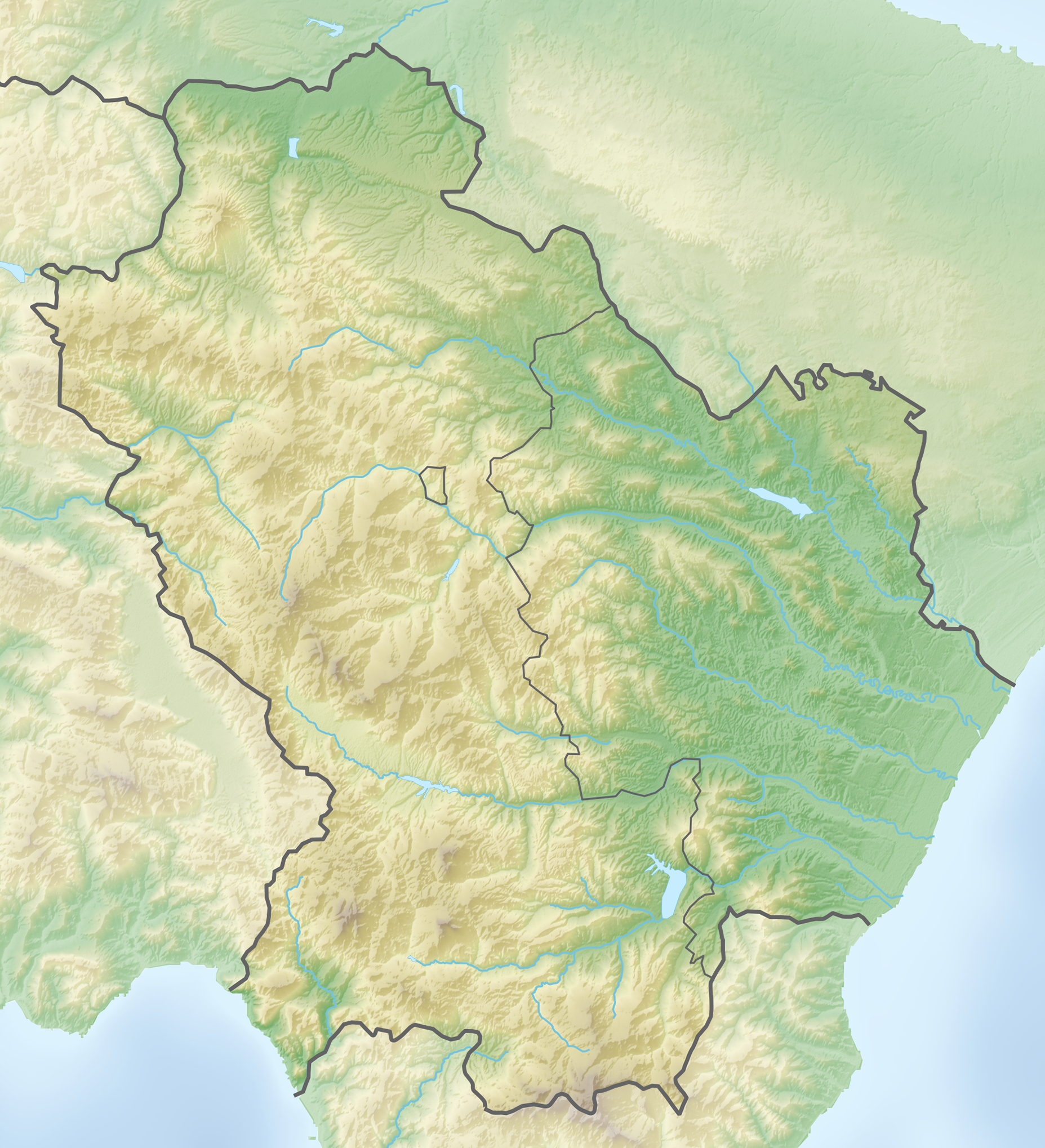
- Location within Basilicata
- Location: Province of Potenza, Basilicata
- Coordinates: 40°17′N 15°59′E
- Primary inflows: fiume Agri
- Primary outflows: Agri
- Basin countries: Italy
- Surface area: 7.5 km^{2} (2.9 sq mi)
- Surface elevation: 532 m (1,745 ft)

Lago di Pietra del Pertusillo is an artificial lake in the Province of Potenza, Basilicata, Italy. At an elevation of 532 m, its catchment basin area is 630 km^{2}, while the lake itself has an area of 7.5 km^{2}.

== Geography ==
Because of water table oscillations in the region and other local effects, it has been documented that the artificial lake has affected regional tectonics and has increased the magnitude of microearthquakes. The critically stressed Monti della Maddalena faults become triggered by small-to-moderate magnitude reservoir-induced seismicity.

The lake is part of the municipalities of Grumento Nova, Spinoso and Montemurlo. Other closest places are Viggiano and Villa d'Agri.

== Dam ==
The arch-gravity dam is 380 meters long and 95 meters high. Its construction has created a reservoir of 155 million cubic meters of water capable of supporting multiple uses of water resources, such as the exploitation of hydroelectric energy and the irrigation of over thirty-five thousand hectares of land between Basilicata and Apulia. It is one of the starting points of the Apulian aqueduct.

- Type: masonry arch-gravity
- Actual start of construction: 1957
- End of construction: 1962
- Total height: 95.00 m
- Maximum reservoir level: 532.00 (m above sea level)
- Maximum flood level: 531.00 (m above sea level)
- Total reservoir capacity: 155 million m³
