= Santa Maria di Constantinopoli, Marsico Nuovo =

Church building in Marsico Nuovo, Italy

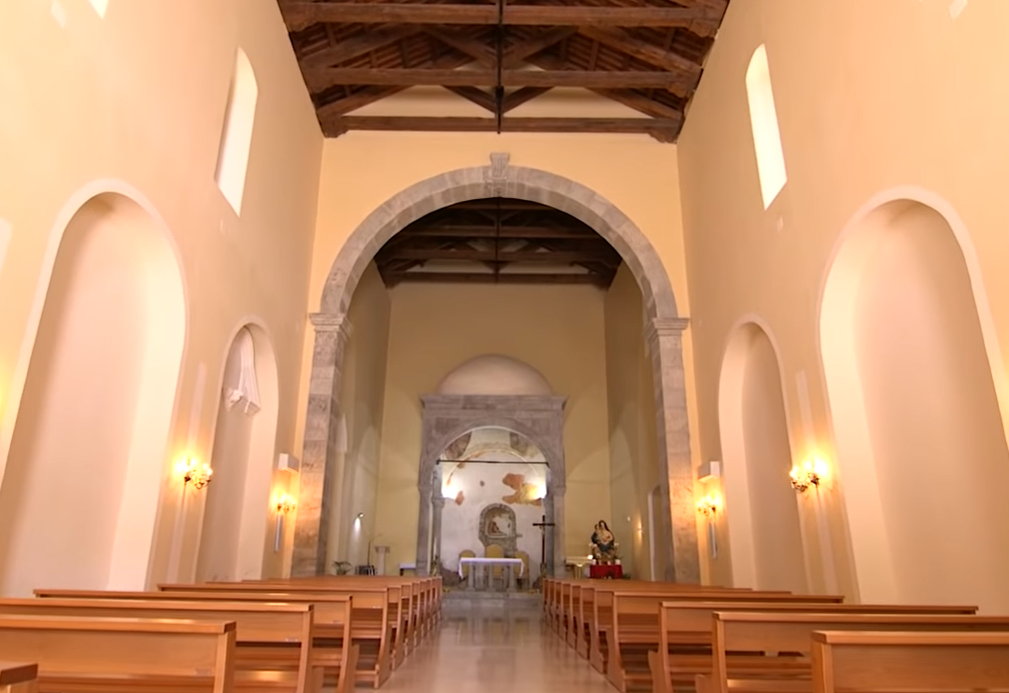

Santa Maria di Costantinopoli is a Roman Catholic church located on Via Santa Maria just outside the town of Marsico Nuovo, near the site of an old bridge over the river Agri, province of Potenza, region of Basilicata, Italy.

== History ==
The church was built in 1593 under the patronage of the Universitas Marsicense. The interior has an elaborate main altar, and a vault with 17th-18th century frescoes depicting the Coronation of the Virgin and Saints. The portal is sculpted in stone.
