= Doris Gwendoline Helliwell =

English-born concert pianist

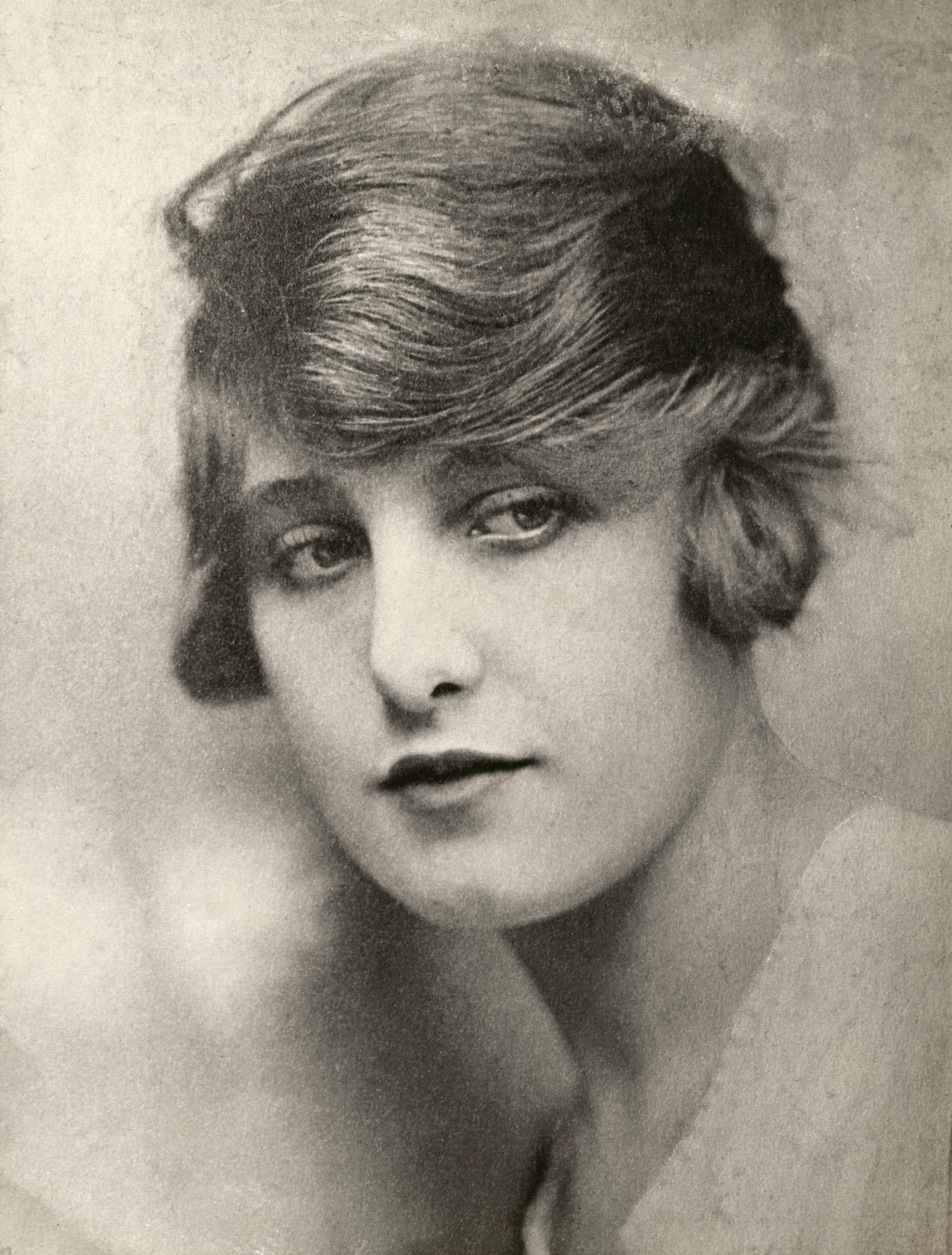
- Born: 16 December 1895; Ecclesall Bierlow, Sheffield, England
- Died: 10 September 1952 (aged 56); Johannesburg, South Africa
- Education: Associate in Music (Honours), Trinity College London
- Occupation: Concert Pianist
- Spouses: Francesco Ferramosca (m. 1916; died 1932) Michele Scuto (Scuto Mitchell) (m. 1932; died 1937) John Francois Burger (m. 1942–1984)
- Children: 2

Doris Gwendoline Helliwell (born 16 December 1895) was an English pianist and beauty pageant titleholder. She was a renowned concert pianist in early Johannesburg, South Africa and was awarded Honours in the Associate in Music examinations through Trinity College, London.

In 1916, Doris married prominent violinist Francesco Ferramosca (b. Francescantonio Ferramosca, 23 August 1893, Viggiano, Italy).

After Ferramosca died in 1932, she married Michele Scuto (name changed to Scuto Mitchell). After Mitchell died a few years later, she married the big-game hunter John Francois Burger. With Burger, she traveled extensively throughout Southern Africa, big-game hunting and gold prospecting. Accompanying them on their journeys was Doris' pet leopard, Spots. These expeditions are documented in various books written by Burger.

As Mrs. Doris Ferramosca she won the inaugural Southern African beauty competition, held by South African Pictorial ("The Union's National Weekly") in 1923, which was a precursor to the official Miss South Africa pageant.

== Early history ==
Doris was born in 1895 in Sheffield, England to Frederick Helliwell (b. 1870), master butcher in Rotherham and Matilda Earnshaw (b. 18 January 1869), school teacher in Treeton. She had one sister, Phyllis Ida Helliwell (b. 22 November 1900, West Riding, Yorkshire). The family emigrated to Johannesburg, Transvaal Colony in the early 1900s. Doris started studying piano under Barclay Donn, a teacher who specialized in grooming promising pianists for public appearances. She later became a student of the acclaimed piano teacher Sr. Lorenzo Danza.

== Musical career ==
Doris performed at a number of concert venues in Johannesburg from 1910 to 1915, and received considerable praise in the press for her interpretations of difficult and intricate piano pieces. She appeared in several printed programmes.

== Family ==
Doris married Francesco Ferramosca (m. 11 January 1916) and they had two boys, Joseph Frederick Lorenzo ("Genzie") Ferramosca (b. 17 May 1916; d. 3 January 2007) and Frank Eugene ("Chickles") Ferramosca (name changed to Mitchell) (b. 21 January 1921; d. 14 March 2003).

After the birth of their children she was persuaded by the Cape Town photographer H. Goldstone to enter into the national weekly journal, South African Pictorial's Beauty Competition. The competition opened on 16 June 1923 and concluded on 24 November 1923. From a large number of entries, Doris won the £20 First Prize. This competition was a precursor of the official Miss South Africa pageant.

Doris' third husband, John Francois Burger, was an avid big-game hunter. In the exploratory days of the early 1900s, despite modern controversy over the practice, game hunting was a substantial source of income for the family. John hunted and slaughtered over 1000 buffalo, by far the most prolific hunter of his time.

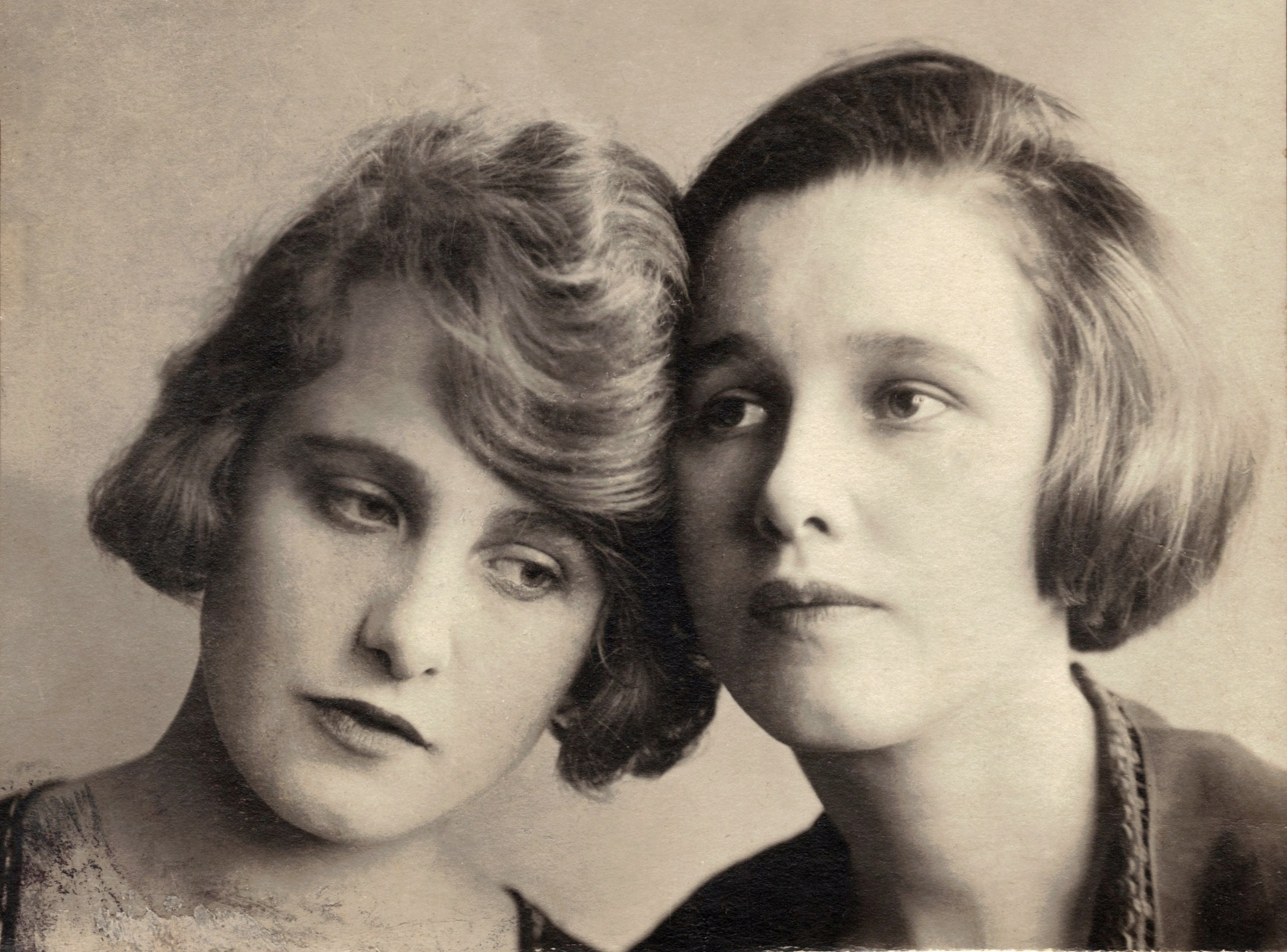
Doris and Phyllis Helliwell
