= Andrisani =

Andrisani is a surname. Notable people with the surname include:

- Antonio Andrisani (born 1966), Italian filmmaker and director
- Donato Andrisani, Italian dental surgeon and namesake of the minor planet Andrisani
