= Paterno, Basilicata =

Paterno
- Comune
- Comune di Paterno
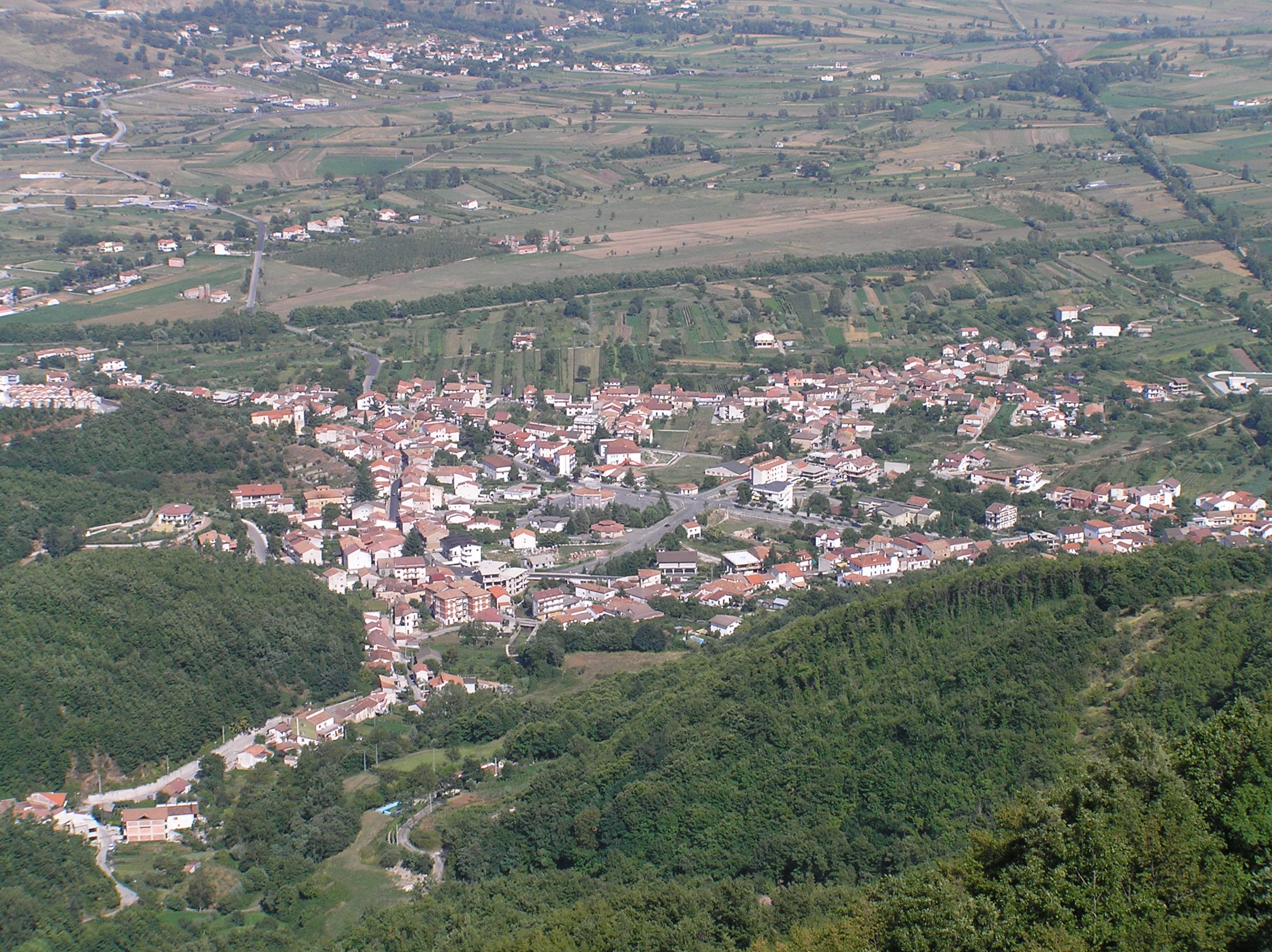
- View of Paterno, Basilicata

- Location within Italy Location within Basilicata
- Coordinates: 40°23′N 15°44′E
- Country: Italy
- Region: Basilicata
- Province: Potenza (PZ)
- Frazioni: Marsico Nuovo, Marsicovetere, Padula (SA), Tramutola

Area
  - Total: 39.25 km^{2} (15.15 sq mi)
- Elevation: 634 m (2,080 ft)

Population (30 March 2008)
  - Total: 3,546
  - Density: 90.34/km^{2} (234.0/sq mi)
- Demonym: Paternesi
- Time zone: UTC+1 (CET)
  - Summer (DST): UTC+2 (CEST)
- Postal code: 85050
- Dialing code: 0975
- ISTAT code: 076100
- Patron saint: San Giovanni Evangelista
- Saint day: 6 May
- Website: Official website

Paterno or Paterno Valdagri (Lucano: Patièrn) is a town and comune in the province of Potenza (Basilicata, southern Italy).
