= Grumentum =

Ancient Roman city in southern Italy

- Location within Italy
- 40°17′02″N 15°54′22″E
- Location: Grumento Nova, Province of Potenza, Basilicata, Italy
- Region: Lucania

History
- Built: 3rd century BC
- Abandoned: 4th century AD
- Event: Battle of Grumentum

Site notes
- Owner: Public
- Management: Soprintendenza per i Beni Archeologici della Basilicata
- Website: Grumentum Archaeological Area

Grumentum (Ancient Greek: Γρούμεντον) was an ancient Roman city in the centre of Lucania, in what is now the comune of Grumento Nova, c. 50 km (31 mi) south of Potenza by the direct road through Anxia, and 80 km (50 mi) by the Via Herculia, at the point of divergence of a road eastward to Heraclea.

The main public buildings of the city have been excavated and are in excellent condition.

== History ==
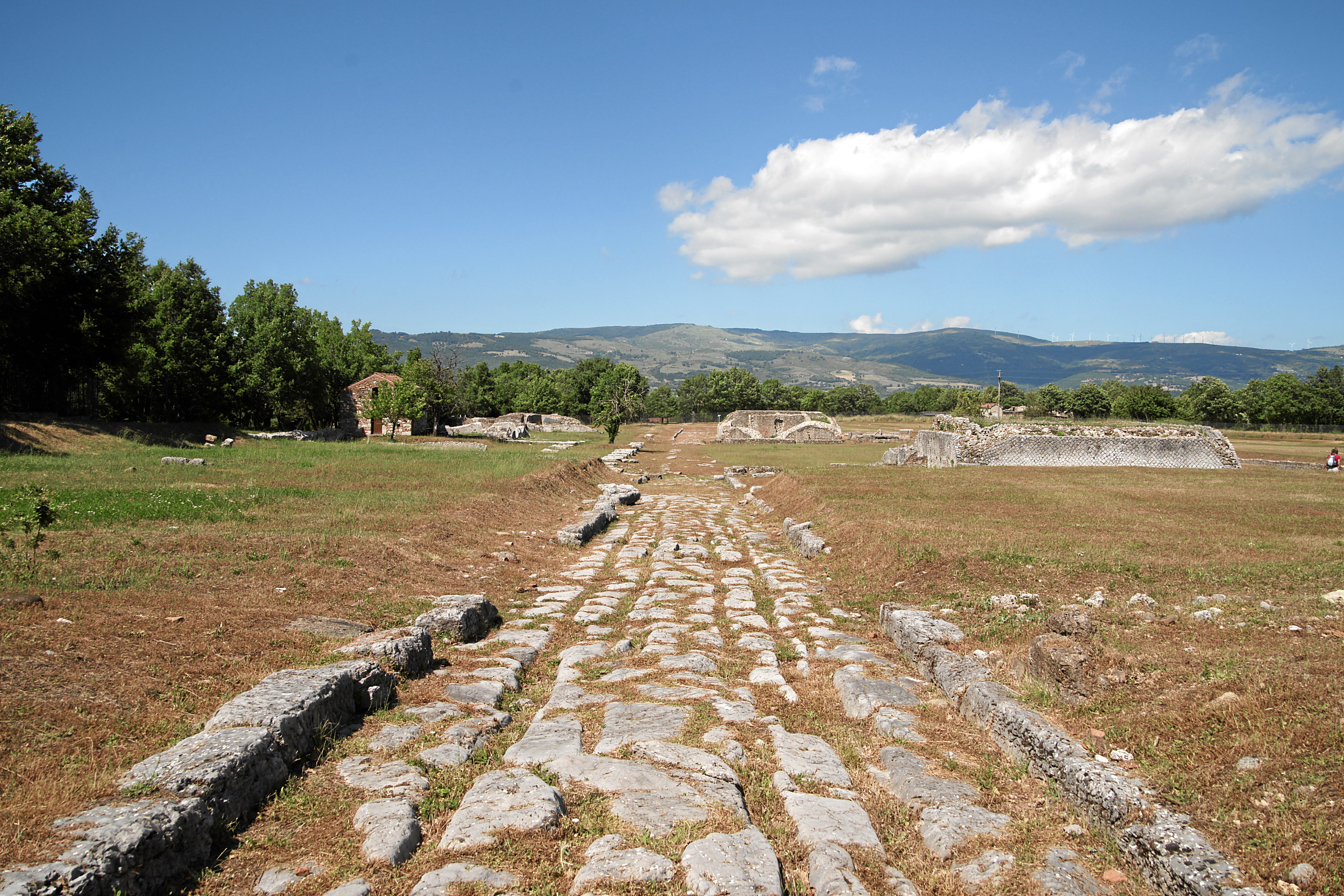
Decumanus

The first Lucanian settlements in the area date from the 6th century BC. The site was founded by the Romans in the 3rd century BC during the Samnite Wars as a fortified vanguard, as part of the creation of a series of fortified outposts in strategic positions: the city arose almost simultaneously with Venusia (291 BC) and Paestum (273 BC). The position was chosen to control important routes (one of which became the via Herculia in the late 200s AD) between Venusia and Heraclea and another road led to the Via Popilia on the Tyrrhenian side.

In 215 BC the Carthaginian general Hanno was defeated under its walls, but in 207 BC Hannibal made it his headquarters, where another battle took place.

In the Social War it was a strong fortress, and seems to have been held by both sides at different times but was sacked by Italic tribes. It became a colony, perhaps in the time of Sulla, at the latest under Augustus, and became important. Starting from the second half of the 1st century BC. the city was rebuilt with a series of public monuments in the Caesarian and Augustan eras.

St. Laverius was martyred here in 312 AD. In 370 AD Grumentum became a bishopric but soon afterwards it began to be abandoned. Due to the Saracen inroads (9th–10th centuries), in 954 a new town (Saponara or Saponaria, the modern Grumento Nova) was founded.

== The Site ==
The site is a ridge on the right bank of the Aciris (Agri) about 600 m (2,000 ft) above sea-level, c. 800 m (2,600 ft) below the modern Grumento Nova, which lies much higher at 772 m.

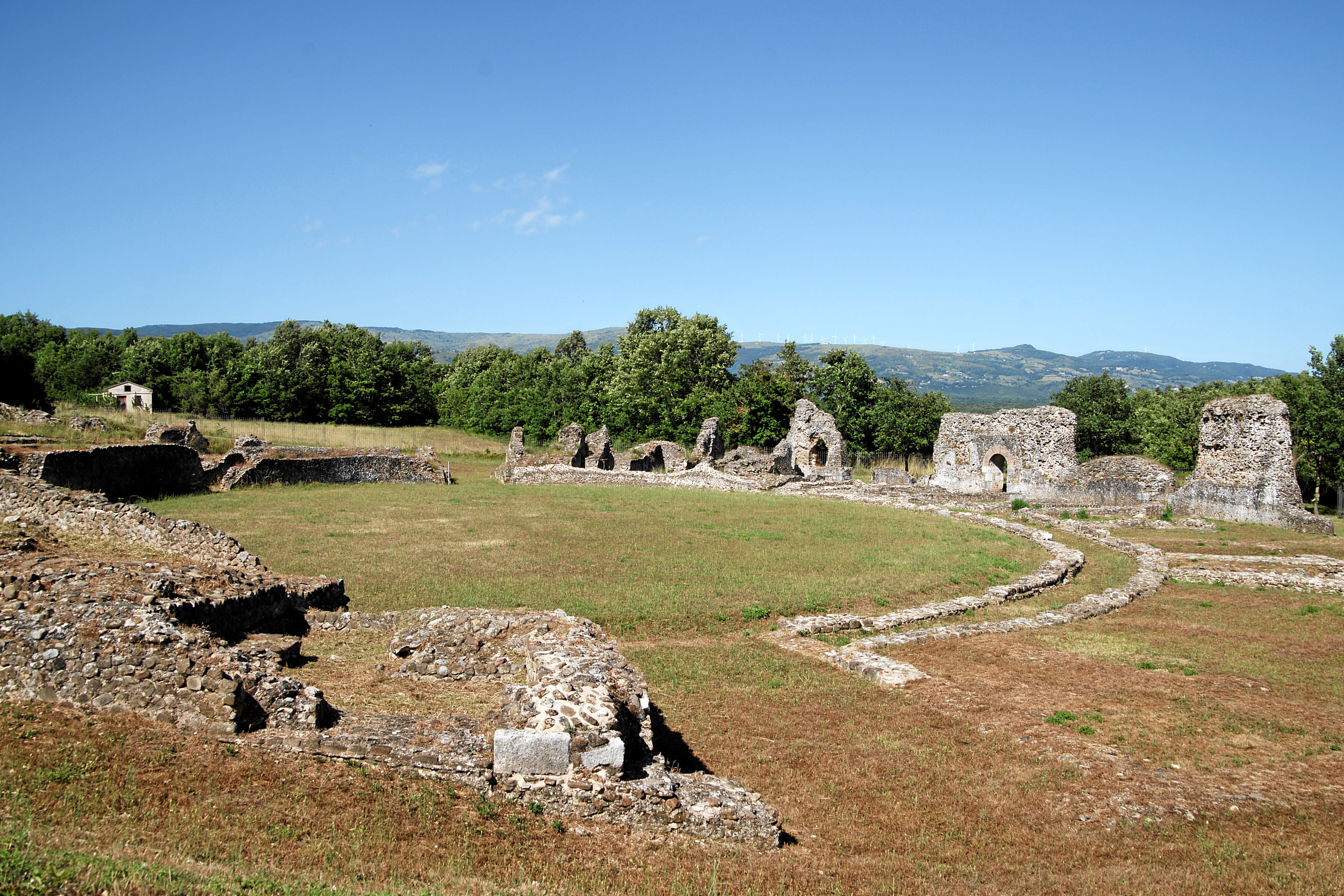
The amphitheatre

Its ruins include those of a large amphitheatre (arena 62.5 m x 60 m, 1st century BC), the only one in Lucania. There are also remains of a theatre. Inscriptions record the repair of its town walls and the construction of thermae (of which remains were found) in 57–51 BC, the construction in 43 BC, of a portico, remains of which may be seen along an ancient road, at right angles to the main road, which traversed Grumentum from south to north. A domus with 4th century mosaics is also present, as well as two small temples of imperial times. Outside the walls monumental tombs, a Palaeo-Christian basilica and an aqueduct have been found.

The aqueduct had its source about 5 km further south and entered the town on the southern side of the plateau. It was transported on arches and emptied into a Castellum Aquae of which some ruins remain.

Many of the finds can be seen in the Archaeological Museum of Grumento Nova.
