= Agri (river) =

River in Basilicata, Italy

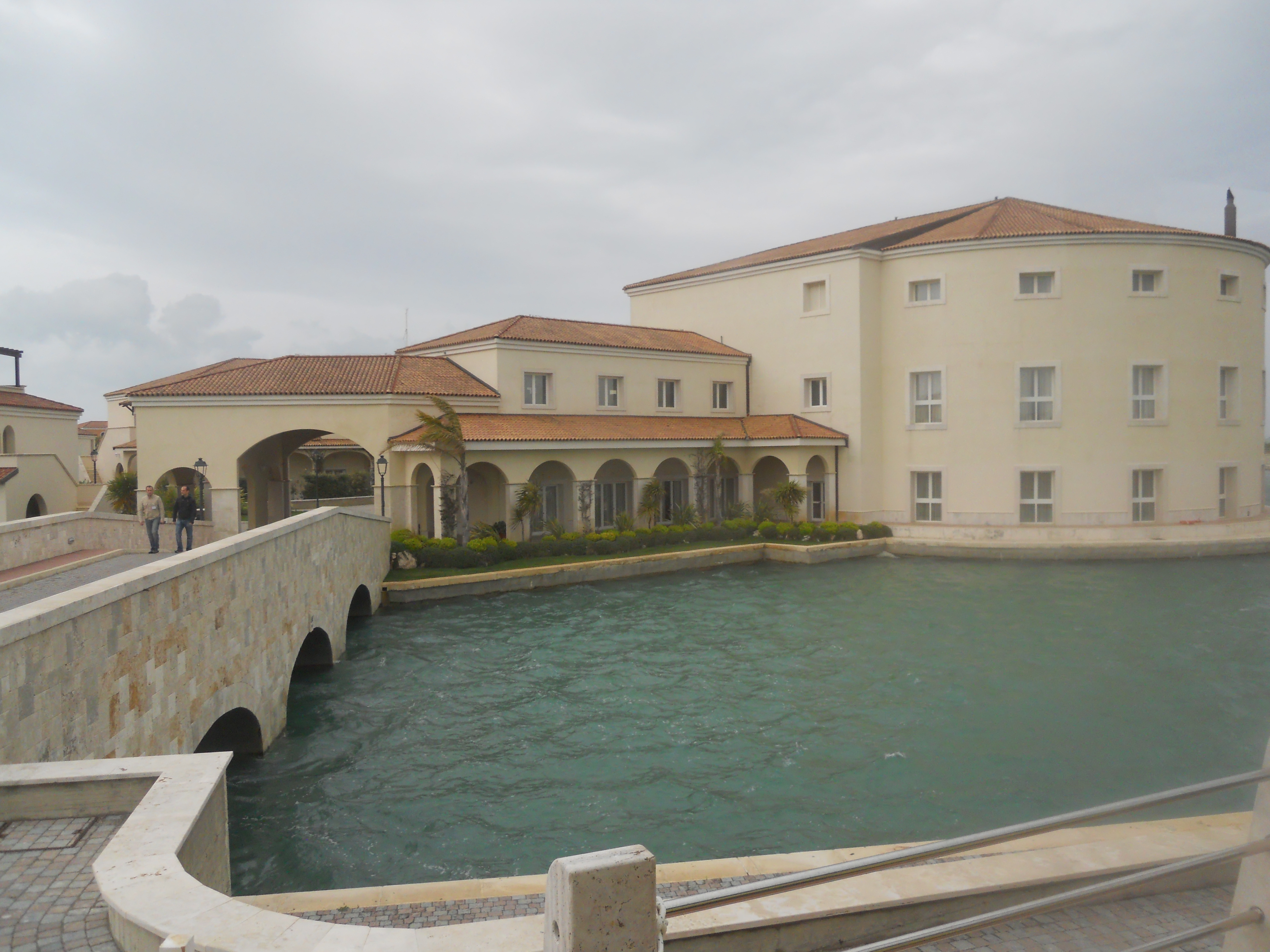

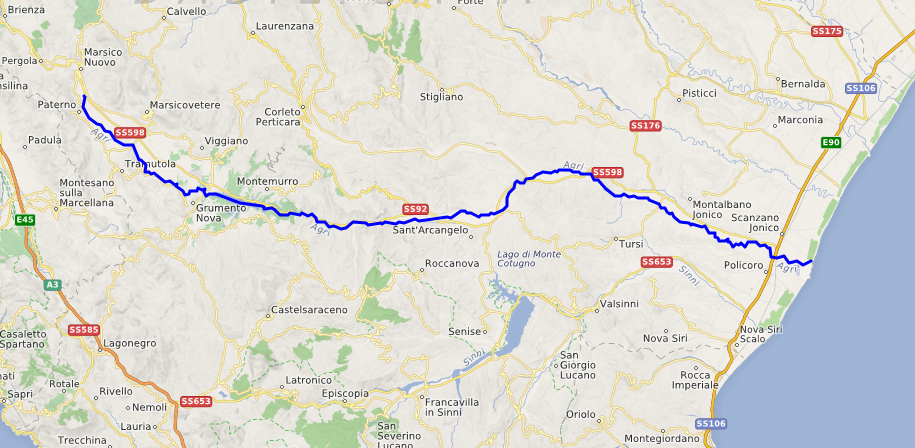
- Course of the Agri

Location
- Country: Italy

Physical characteristics
- Source
  - location: north of Monte Volturino
  - elevation: 1567 meters above sea level
- Mouth: Gulf of Taranto
  - location: near Policoro
  - coordinates: 40.2223°N 16.7411°E
- Length: 136 km (85 mi)
- Basin size: 1,770 km^{2} (680 mi^{2})
- Discharge
  - average: 20 m^{3}/s (710 cu ft/s)

The Agri is a river in the Basilicata region of southern Italy. In ancient times it was known as Aciris (Ancient Greek: Ἄκιρις, romanized: Akiris). The source of the river is in the Lucan Apennines north of Monte Volturino and west of Calvello in the province of Potenza. It is near the source of the Basento.

== Hydrography ==
The river flows south near Paterno before curving southeast, near Villa d'Agri. It flows near Tramutola, Viggiano, and Grumento Nova before entering a lake. After exiting the lake, the river flows eastward near Armento, Missanello, Aliano, and Sant'Arcangelo. A right tributary, the Racanello, enters the river in this area. The river forms the border between the province of Potenza and the province of Matera for part of this area of the river. It flows into a small lake before entering the province of Matera. The river flows for a short distance before entering Lago di Gannano. After exiting the lake, the river flows southeast near Tursi, Montalbano Jonico, and Scanzano Jonico before flowing into the Gulf of Taranto near Policoro.
