= Francesco Ferramosca =

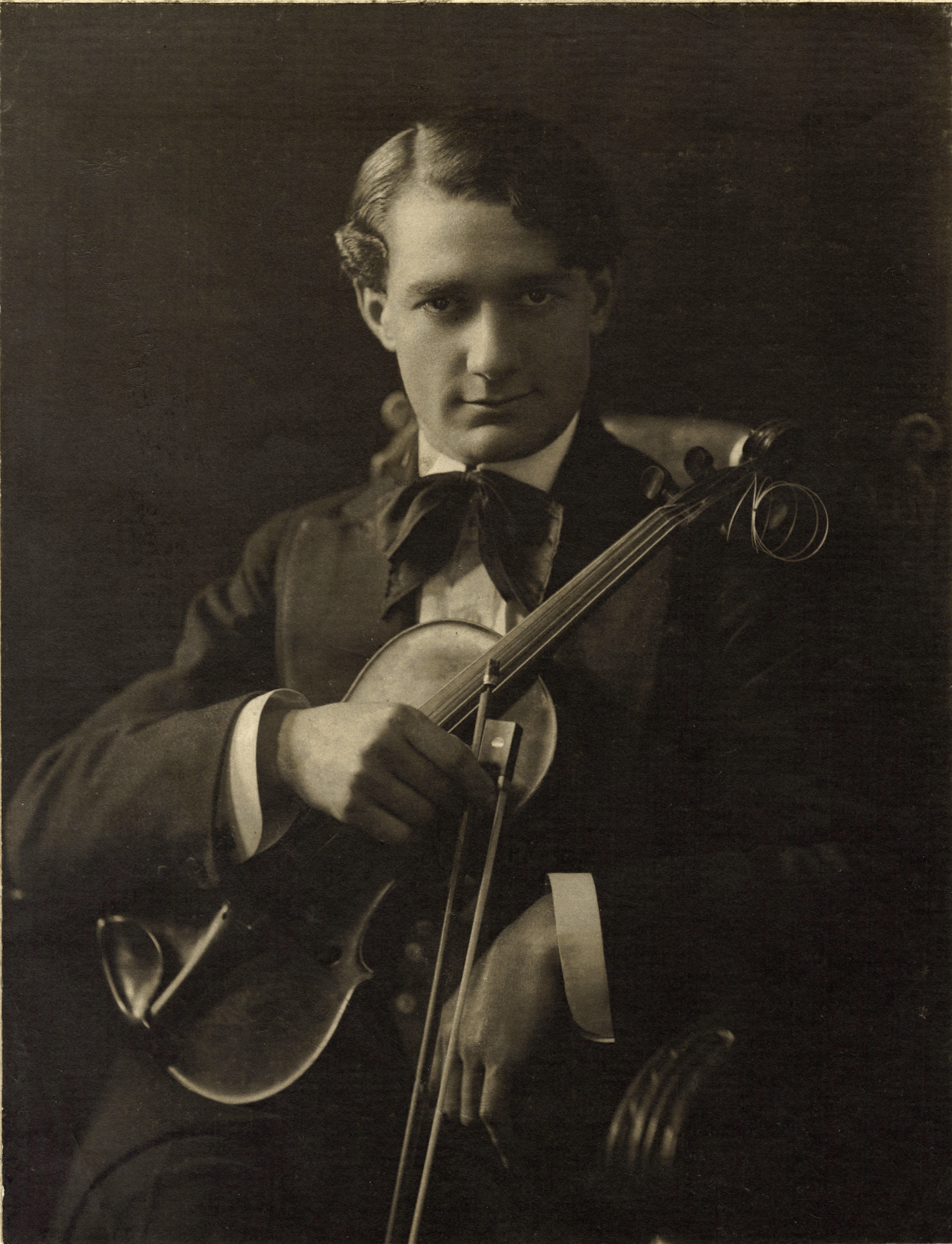
- Born: Francescantonio Ferramosca; August 23, 1893; Viggiano, Basilicata, Italy
- Died: May 29, 1932 (aged 38); Johannesburg, South Africa
- Occupations: Violin Virtuoso and Orchestral Leader
- Years active: 1907–1932
- Spouse: Doris Gwendoline Helliwell (m. 1916)
- Children: 2

Sr. Francesco Ferramosca (born August 23, 1893) was a professional violinist from Viggiano, Basilicata, Italy, who, in early Johannesburg, South Africa, rose to fame in the 1910s as one of the most talented violinists in the country. He adjudicated many competitions for promising musical students. As an acclaimed soloist and orchestral leader he performed in various locations in Southern Africa between 1907–1932 to audiences in large halls, tearooms and bars, social events and Eisteddfods.

== Early life ==
Francesco was the fifth child of Giuseppe Ferramosca (b. November 11, 1850) and Agnese Mariarosa Miraglia (b. January 19, 1858, m. June 8, 1879). Apart from two children that died young, he and his three remaining siblings were all talented musicians in Viggiano. He started learning the violin at age six and very soon showed promise. However, after some years he contracted tuberculosis and his health deteriorated. It was then that his father decided to bring him to South Africa, known for its dry climate and TB facilities. The family had contacts with a number of Italian musicians in Johannesburg, so Giuseppe brought Francesco and his brother Nicola to Johannesburg around 1907 to seek treatment for him. Amongst his contacts were Sr. Galeffe, a cellist, and Sr. Lorenzo Danza, a pianist. Francesco was left in their charge, and his father and brother returned to Viggiano.

== Career ==
Whilst receiving treatment, Francesco continued to study violin. In those days, Johannesburg resembled an overgrown mining camp with very few large buildings surrounded by ordinary houses. There was little work outside of the mines and almost nothing for a young musician. Francesco was reduced to playing in the streets for a few pennies, but that proved to be the start to his career. In 1908, a renowned overseas music trio consisting of the three Cherniavsky brothers, Leo (violin), Mischel (cello) and Jan (piano), were touring South Africa . They saw Francesco performing on Eloff Street, and were so impressed at his tone and virtuosity, they spent months giving him more training and polishing up his technique. This eventually led to Francesco joining a trio with Sr. Lorenzo Danza on piano and Reuben Goldberg on cello. The trio became very popular, and played in venues throughout The Reef, Pretoria, and in neighboring Lourenço Marques (now Maputo), Mozambique, as well as socialite weddings.

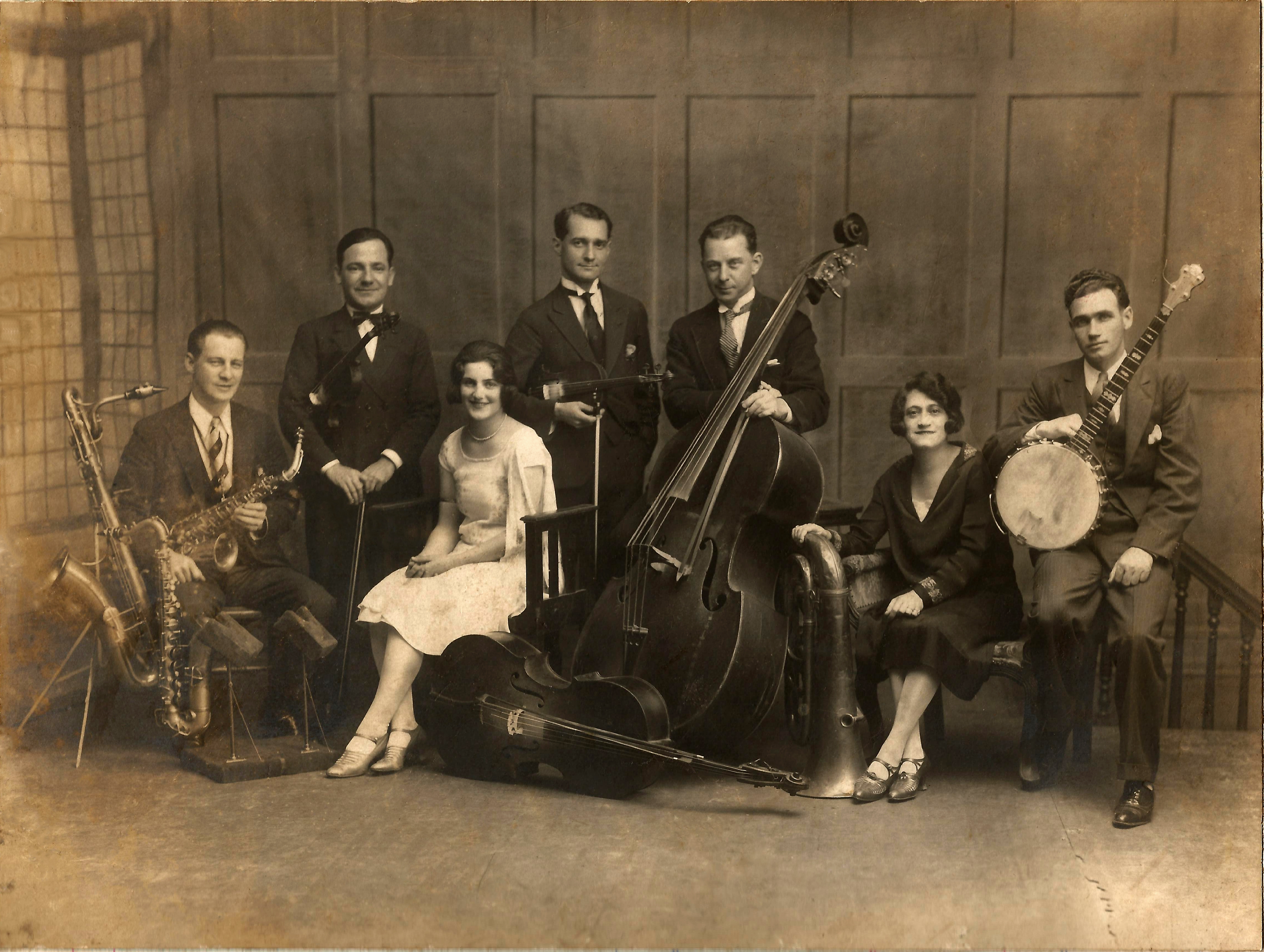
Orchestra Ferramosca at The Waldorf Cafe, Cape Town, 1925

During his concerts, he met Doris Gwendoline Helliwell, an accomplished concert pianist, who thereafter accompanied him on various occasions. Francesco married Doris (m. January 11, 1916) and they had two boys, Joseph Frederick Lorenzo ("Genzie") Ferramosca (b. May 17, 1916, d. January 3, 2007), and Frank Eugene ("Chickles") Ferramosca (surname changed to Mitchell) (b. January 21, 1921, d. March 14, 2003).

The trio played regularly at Johannesburg's Balcony Tea Room (later to become The Corner Lounge ) on the first floor of the Cuthberts building . In the following years, the trio expanded to an orchestra of seven ("Orchestra Ferramosca"), with Francesco as leader, and were regular performers at The Corner Lounge. The orchestra also played frequently at The Lounge, Madeleine's and Gloria. By 1920 Francesco was recognized as the finest violinist in the country. In June 1924, he left with his family for a short tour of Italy, and a benefit concert for him was arranged by an "influential committee", with a "highly attractive musical programme".

In 1925 he and his orchestra were offered a regular position at the Waldorf Cafe , Cape Town and decided to relocate with his family to Mouille Point. While in Cape Town, he performed with the Cape Town Symphony Orchestra on a number of occasions. After three years, he returned to Johannesburg in early 1928, where he performed with the Johannesburg Symphony Orchestra and played evenings at the O.K. tea room and finally at Rondi's. The orchestra was the first to broadcast from a tea room, having a regular half-hour slot on the local SABC radio station .

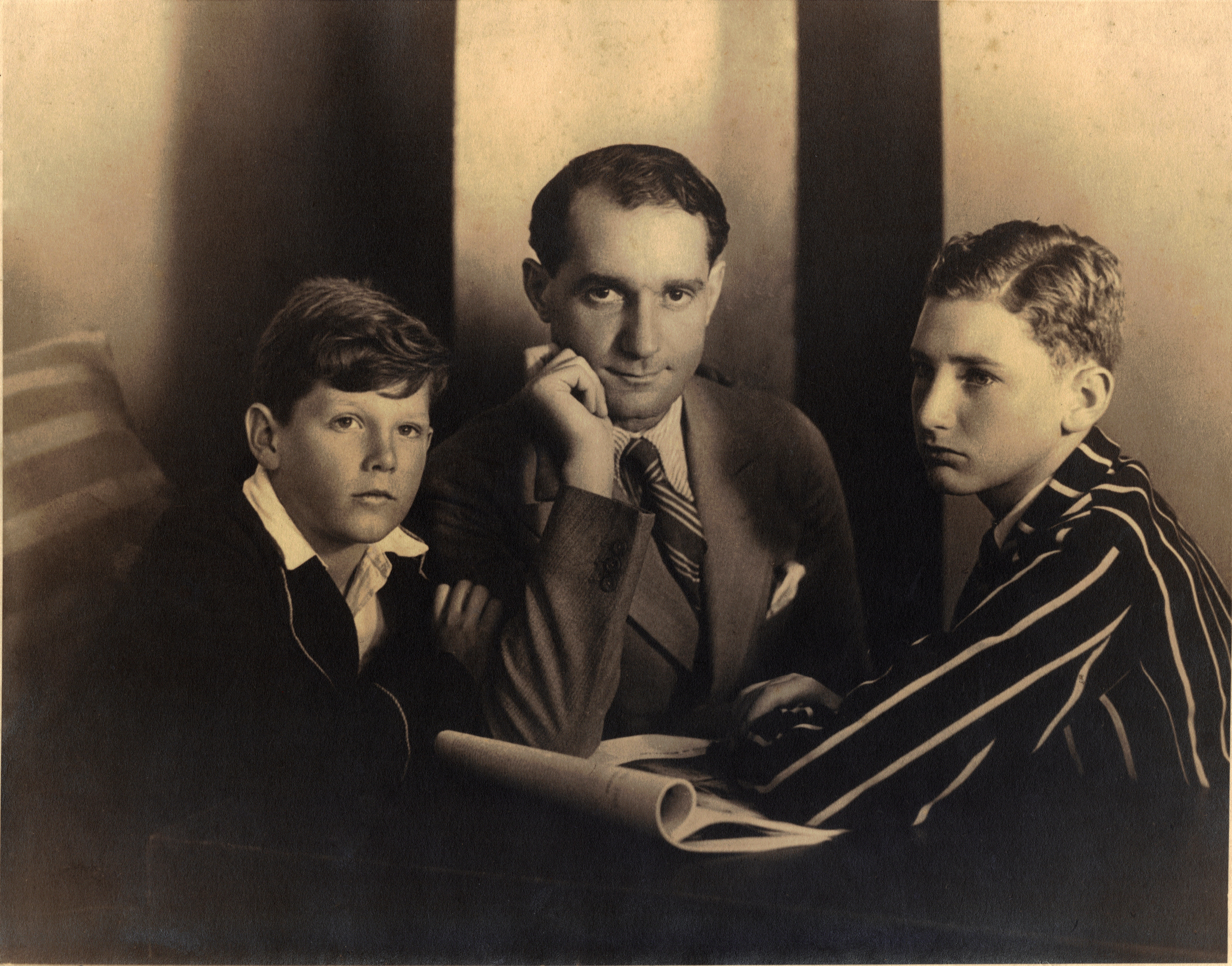
Francesco with his two sons, Frank and Lorenzo, Johannesburg, 1929

== Later life ==
The damp air and bad weather in Cape Town had a detrimental effect on Francesco's health, and his TB resurfaced. After returning to Johannesburg, his health deteriorated significantly and after some months he was admitted into isolation at the Nelspoort Sanitarium in the Karoo desert, renowned for its treatment of TB. He made good progress and came back to Johannesburg in October 1928 to resume his career. However, the odd hours and smoky atmosphere took its toll, and he spent another three months at Nelspoort. He returned to Johannesburg, but soon after succumbed to a throat affliction, and died in May 1932 at the Hillbrow General Hospital. He is buried at Westpark Cemetery, Johannesburg.

== Repertoire ==
Sampling of programmed performances:

Date	Piece	Composer
06/14/1917	Trio in Q in F Minor, Op. 73	Arensky
06/14/1917	Synphonie Studies, Op. 13	Schumann
06/14/1917	Sonata in C Minor, Op. 45	Grieg
06/14/1917	Trio in C Major, Op.	Martucci
09/06/1917	Trio in C Minor, Op. 66	Mendelssohn
09/06/1917	Introduction and Rondo Capriccioso (Violin Solo)	Saint-Saens
09/06/1917	Polonaise, F Sharp Minor, Op. 44	Chopin

Date	Piece	Composer
08/16/1917	Trio in D Minor, Op. 63	Schumann
08/16/1917	Concerto in A Minor for Violincello, Op. 33	Saint-Saens
08/16/1917	Trio in A Minor, Op. 64	Sinding
05/09/1918	Trio, Op. 90, 'Dumky'	Dvorak
05/09/1918	Andantino and Allegro	Michel Angelo Rossi
05/09/1918	Sonata in A Major	Domenico Scarlatti
05/09/1918	Chaconne, with Variations	Handel

Date	Piece	Composer
05/09/1918	Quintette in F Minor	César Franck
07/04/1918	Quartet for Violin, Viola and Cello in E Flat, Op. 16	Beethoven
07/04/1918	Sonata, G Minor	Tartini
07/04/1918	Trio Op. 50 in A Minor	Tchaikowsky
12/30/1920	First Movement	Mendelssohn
12/30/1920	Spanish Dances	Sarasate
12/30/1920	Ave Maria	Schubert-Wilhelmig

Concertos:
- Max Bruch
- Beethoven
- Brahms
- Mendelsohn
- Mozart
Violin Solos:
- Sarasate
- Brahms Hungarian Dances
- Kreisler (in particular Liebeslied, Liebesfreud, Schon Rosmarin)
