= The Week (Brisbane) =

Queensland, Australia newspaper (1876 - 1934)

Front page of first issue, 1 January 1876.

The Week was a newspaper published in Brisbane, Queensland, Australia. Its masthead described it as "A Journal of Commerce, Farming, Mining & General Information & Amusement".

== History ==
The newspaper was published from 1 January 1876 to 27 June 1934.

== Digitisation ==
The newspaper has been digitised as part of the Trove digitised newspaper collection.
