= Leonardo De Lorenzo =

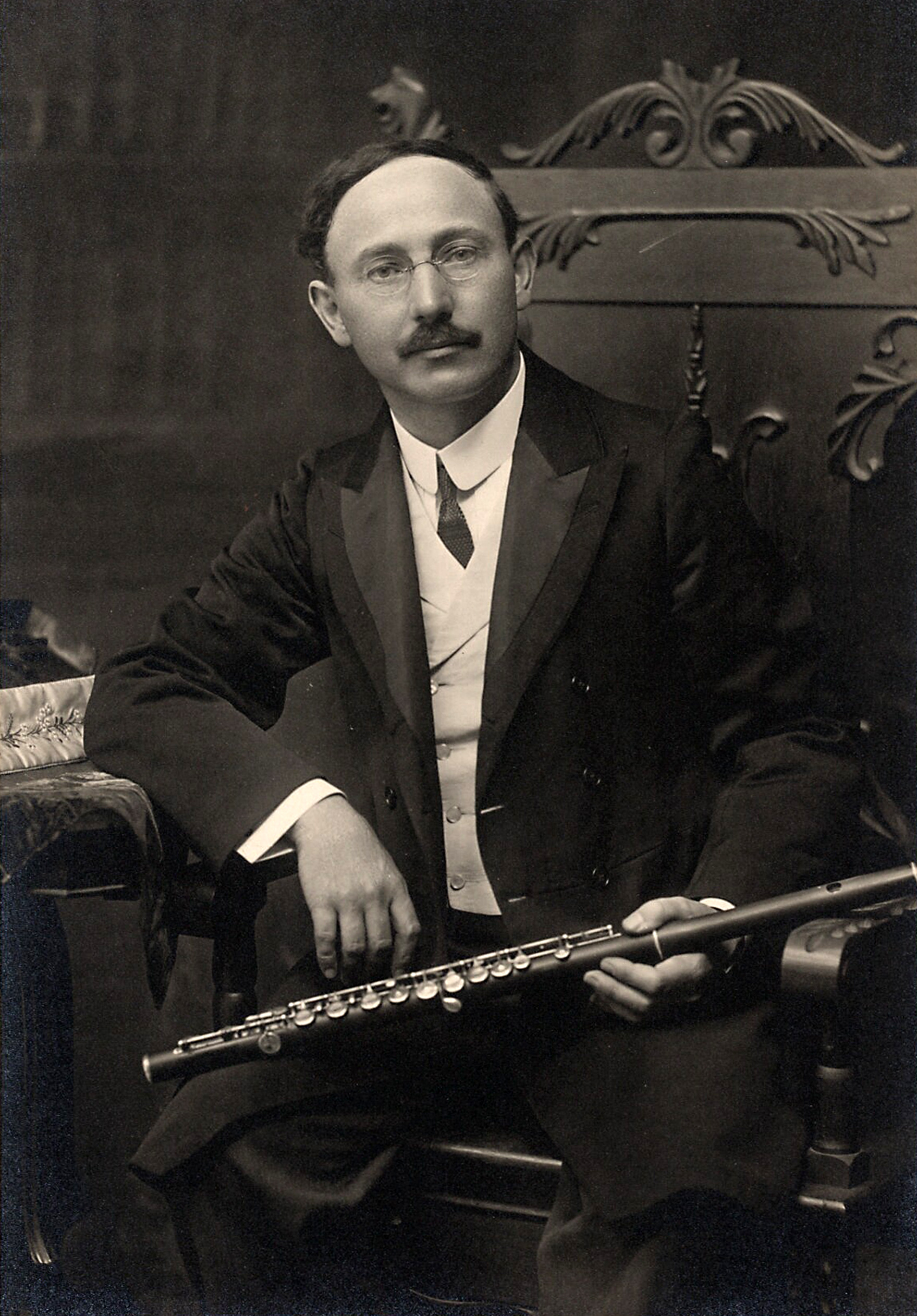
- Leonardo De Lorenzo in 1913

Background information
- Born: 29 August 1875; Viggiano, Basilicata
- Died: 29 July 1962 (aged 86) Santa Barbara, California
- Genre: Classical
- Occupations: Flutist, professor
- Instrument: Flute

Leonardo De Lorenzo (29 August 1875 – 29 July 1962) was an Italian virtuoso flautist and music educator. He served as the principal flautist at the New York Philharmonic under Gustav Mahler. Included among his pupils at the Eastman School of Music was the flautist Julius Baker.

== Biography ==
Born at Viggiano, in the province of Potenza, De Lorenzo started playing the flute at the age of 8 and went to Naples to attend the Music conservatory "San Pietro a Majella". At 16, he moved to the United States, working at a hotel in Cerulean, Kentucky, but in 1896 he returned to Italy for military service in Alessandria, becoming a member of a military band directed by Giovanni Moranzoni.

Subsequently, he began his own career and toured in Italy, Germany, England and South Africa. He joined an orchestra in Cape Town at 25. In 1907, he returned to Naples to complete his studies, then he went to America again, becoming the first flautist of the New York Philharmonic Orchestra, directed by Gustav Mahler, and played with the New York Symphony Orchestra, in substitution of Georges Barrère.

He was also a flautist of the orchestras of Minneapolis, Los Angeles and Rochester. In 1914, during his collaboration with the Minneapolis Symphony Orchestra, he met Maude Peterson, a pianist who frequently accompanied him and became his wife. In 1917, the Los Angeles Flute Club played a musical in his honour and De Lorenzo was appointed the first honorary member of the association.

From 1923 to 1935, he was a professor of flute at the Eastman School of Music, where one of his students was Julius Baker, considered one of the greatest American flautists of his generation. After his retirement, De Lorenzo focused on composition and writing of theoretical publications. Works such as Saltarello and Pizzica-pizzica are a homage to the characteristic sounds of the traditional music of his native town. In 1951, he released the book My complete story of the flute, a result of intensive research by De Lorenzo, which made him one of the most eminent flute pedagogues of the 20th century.

All of his research material was donated to the University of Southern California on 25 October 1953. In the same year, he received an honorary doctorate from the Washington International Academy of Rome and was godfather for the newly formed flute club in Milan. On 29 August 1955, the Los Angeles Flute Club organized a concert playing his compositions for his 80th birthday. De Lorenzo died in his home in Santa Barbara, California. The International Flute Competition "Leonardo De Lorenzo", held every two years in Viggiano from 1997 to 2013, was dedicated to him.

== Compositions ==
External audio
- You may hear De Lorenzo and harpist Salvatore de Stefano playing: Giovalita (Op. 15) and La Capricieuse in 1915; Here on DAHR

- Appassionato, for flute, op. 5
- Giovialità, for flute and piano, op. 15
- Serenata, for flute and piano, op. 16
- 2 Pieces for flute and piano, op.17
- 2 Pieces for flute and piano, op.18
- 2 Pieces for flute and piano, op.19
- 2 Pieces for flute and piano, op.20
- 2 Pieces for flute and piano, op.21
- 2 Pieces for flute and piano, op.22
- 2 Pieces for flute and piano, op.23
- Saltarello, for flute, op. 27
- Carnevale di Venezia, for flute
- Nove grandi studi
- I tre virtuosi, for three flutes, op. 31
- I seguaci di Pan, for four flutes, op. 32
- Non plus ultra, for flute, op. 34
- Pizzica-Pizzica, for flute, op. 37
- Suite mitologica, for flute, op. 38
- Idillio, for flute and piano, op. 67
- Improvviso, for flute and piano, op. 72
- Sinfonietta (Divertimento Flautistico), for five flutes, op. 75
- Trio Eccentrico, for flute, clarinet and bassoon, op. 76
- Trio Romantico, for flute, oboe and clarinet, op. 78
- I quattro virtuosi (Divertimento fantastico), for flute, oboe, clarinet and bassoon, op. 80
- Capriccio, for four flutes, op. 82

== Didactic works ==
- L'Indispensabile. A complete modern school for the flute (1912)
- My complete story of the flute (1951)

== Archived Works ==
- The University of Rochester's Sibley Music Library contains thirty scores by Leonardo De Lorenzo for viewing online.
- The International Music Score Library Project (IMSLP) contains several scores by Leonardo De Lorenzo which are available for viewing online.
