= Marsico Nuovo =

- Comune
- Comune di Marsico Nuovo
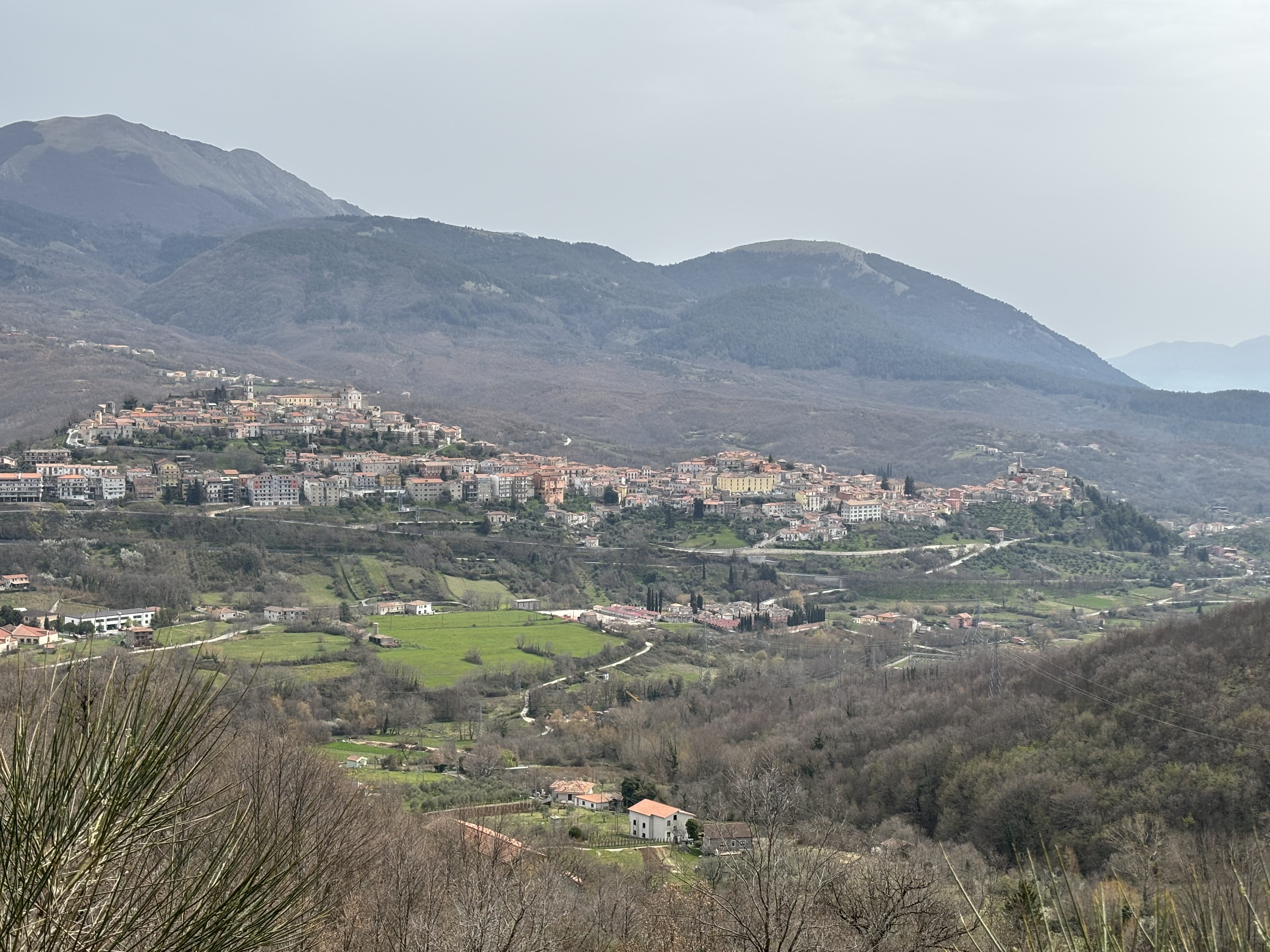
- View of Marsico Nuovo from Maddalena’s mountains

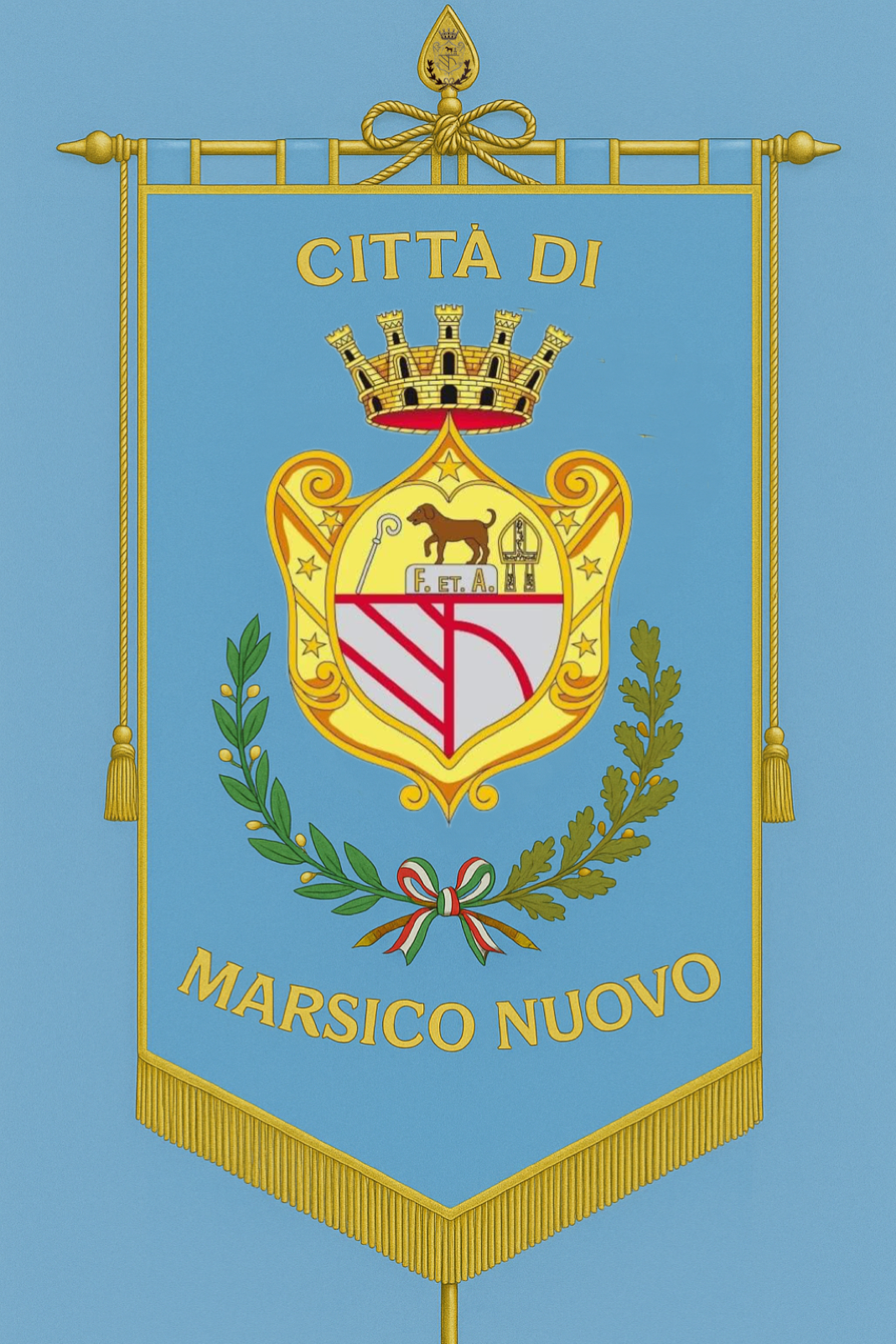
- Coat of arms

- Location within Italy Location within Basilicata
- Coordinates: 40°25′N 15°44′E
- Country: Italy
- Region: Basilicata
- Province: Potenza (PZ)
- Frazioni: Pergola, San Vito, Ginestole-Decolla, Calabritto-Cognone, Agri, Camporeale, Santa Maria, Cappuccini, Santino, Cerbaia, Sant’Elia, Galaino, Pagliarone

Government
  - Mayor: Massimo Macchia

Area
  - Total: 101 km^{2} (39 sq mi)
- Elevation: 865 m (2,838 ft)

Population (31 December 2017)
  - Total: 4,014
  - Density: 39.7/km^{2} (103/sq mi)
- Demonym: Marsicani
- Time zone: UTC+1 (CET)
  - Summer (DST): UTC+2 (CEST)
- Postal code: 85052
- Dialing code: 0975
- ISTAT code: 076045
- Patron saint: San Gianuario Bishop and Martyr
- Saint day: 26 August, 26 April

Marsico Nuovo (Lucano: Màrsëchë) is a town and comune of the province of Potenza in the Basilicata region of southern Italy.

It is an agricultural centre in the Agri river valley.

== Geography ==
Situated at 865 m above sea level, the town extends over three hills overlooking the Val d’Agri: Civita, the highest, hosting the historic center; Portello and Casale, lower hills with modern expansion. Surrounding it are the peaks of Mount Facito (1,360 m a.s.l.), Maruggio (1,576 m a.s.l.), Calvelluzzo (1,701 m a.s.l.), Malagrina (1,016 m a.s.l.), Tumolo (1,198 m a.s.l.), Volturino (1,835 m a.s.l.), Cognone (1,035 m a.s.l.), Ausineto (1,087 m a.s.l.), Lama (1,568 m a.s.l.), Cavallo (1,336 m a.s.l.), Cavalluccio (1,252 m a.s.l.), Fontanalunga (1,384 m a.s.l.), Schiavo (1,300 m a.s.l.), and Arioso (1,707 m a.s.l.).

Watercourses include the Agri River, and the area also features the Lake of Piana del Lago (1,290 m^{2}).

== History ==
Random archaeological discoveries have allowed scholars to confidently attribute human activity in the area to the pre-Roman period, and possibly identify a settlement on the upper part of the Civita hill, hypothetically linked to Abellinum Marsicum, mentioned by Pliny, and datable between the 5th and 4th centuries BCE. The settlement occupied a strategic position controlling the entrance to the Val d’Agri and the routes toward Salerno and Potenza.

The foundation is attributed to the Italic people known as the Marsi, who practiced the Ver Sacrum, or “Sacred Spring,” a ritual of Italic origin that involved founding new colonies due to demographic needs and agricultural or pastoral demands. It was also believed to avert famine. Migration was guided in a totemic-like manner, interpreting the path of a “guide animal” to determine the direction of travel. According to legend, the Marsi followed the Apennine ridge from central Italy: a consecrated dog, leaving its homeland, supposedly led a Marsian tribe into Lucania, founding the city later named Abellinum Marsicum by the Romans, whose municipal symbol today is a dog.

However, there is no archaeological evidence or significant written documentation to confirm this account as fact. Linguistic explanations suggest alternative origins for the name: the Byzantine term Martzikon (Μαρτζίκον) indicates a fortified settlement, a historically plausible interpretation. The Lombard marsik and Latin marsicum, both meaning “marshy place,” may also have influenced the name, as the Val d’Agri historically contained marshes caused by the spring and autumn floods of the Agri River. Marsico Nuovo and Marsicovetere are distinguished by the adjective, which might suggest a foundation in different periods—a hypothesis considered unlikely, as both settlements are pre-Roman. Some scholars argue that this distinction reflects territorial control shifts between Lombards and Byzantines, with Marsico Nuovo representing the northern settlement. Others dispute this, suggesting that the adjective “Nuovo” (New) may have arisen more recently, perhaps spontaneously, rather than indicating a reconstruction following a disaster or invasion.

The city of Abellinum Marsicum, cited by Pliny, was part of a federation of Lucanian city-states resisting Roman penetration into Lucania. After the founding of the Roman colony of Grumentum, the Lucanian center declined, recovering with the creation of the Via Herculea between the colonies of Venusia and Grumentum. Along this route, where a milestone has been found, a statio was established, referred to as Acidios, Aciris, or Agri.

With the arrival of the Lombards and their conflicts with Byzantines and Saracens, the city regained strategic importance, lying on the southern border of the Lombard principality of Salerno. Around 940, Prince Gisulfo I elevated the city to a county overseeing a large territory. It was fortified and experienced significant population growth, achieving the status of civitas.

In 1054, the episcopal seat of the Diocese of Grumentum was moved to Marsico. Under the Normans, it became the administrative center of a territory covering nearly the entire Vallo di Diano and lower Cilento. Robert Guiscard, as Prince of Salerno, granted it in fief to Rinaldo Malaconvenienza, son of Asclettino. In 1144, a member of the Hauteville family, Silvestro, son of the Count of Ragusa and first cousin to the King of Sicily, was made Count of Marsico. The Hautevilles were succeeded by the Guarna family, and in the 13th century, the county passed to the Sanseverino.

Most Counts of Marsico served as grand constables and royal advisors, influencing the kingdom's politics throughout the Angevin period, and under the Aragonese became Princes of Salerno. The last Count of Marsico and Prince of Salerno, Ferrante Sanseverino, clashed with the viceroy of Naples and was exiled in 1552, and his fiefs were put up for sale. The Universitas Marsicana raised the required sum to redeem the city, which was thus incorporated into the royal domain.

In 1638, however, as the viceroyal treasury was insolvent and the citizens unable to maintain administrative autonomy, the city was sold again, purchased by the Pignatelli family with the title of princes. In 1647, the city was affected by popular uprisings linked to Masaniello's revolution. Prince Francesco Pignatelli was forced to flee, while about ten courtiers were killed by the revolting crowd. The 1656 plague halved the population, and only in the 19th century did the city regain significant demographic weight, surpassing ten thousand inhabitants by mid-century.

In February 1799, Marsico also raised the symbolic “Tree of Liberty”: the feudal lords Diego and Vincenzo Pignatelli, along with Bishop Bernardo Maria Della Torre, supported revolutionary ideas. The city quickly joined the Parthenopean Republic, becoming a canton of the Bradano department administered by government commissioner Nicola Palomba, later suffering damage from Sanfedist bands from Calabria. By 1820, the city hosted a Carbonari “vendita” (the “School of Customs”) and participated in the Risorgimento struggles.

On May 1, 1816, an administrative reform in the Kingdom of Naples transferred Marsico from the Principato Citra, with Salerno as its capital, to the Potenza district, of which Marsico immediately became the district capital. This placed the municipality in the modern administrative region of Basilicata and the province of Potenza, ending a nearly thousand-year connection with Salerno (since its elevation to a county in 940).

The 1857 earthquake destroyed much of Marsico Nuovo and neighboring villages. A few years later, violent incidents involved local gang leaders Angelantonio Masini and Federico Aliano, nicknamed “Forgiarello,” from Paterno. In the 20th century, the city experienced economic decline due to migration waves following the two World Wars.

== Main sights ==
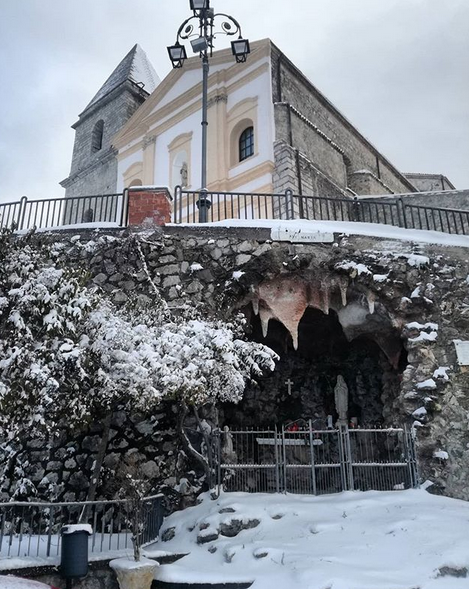
Saint George the Martyr Cathedral

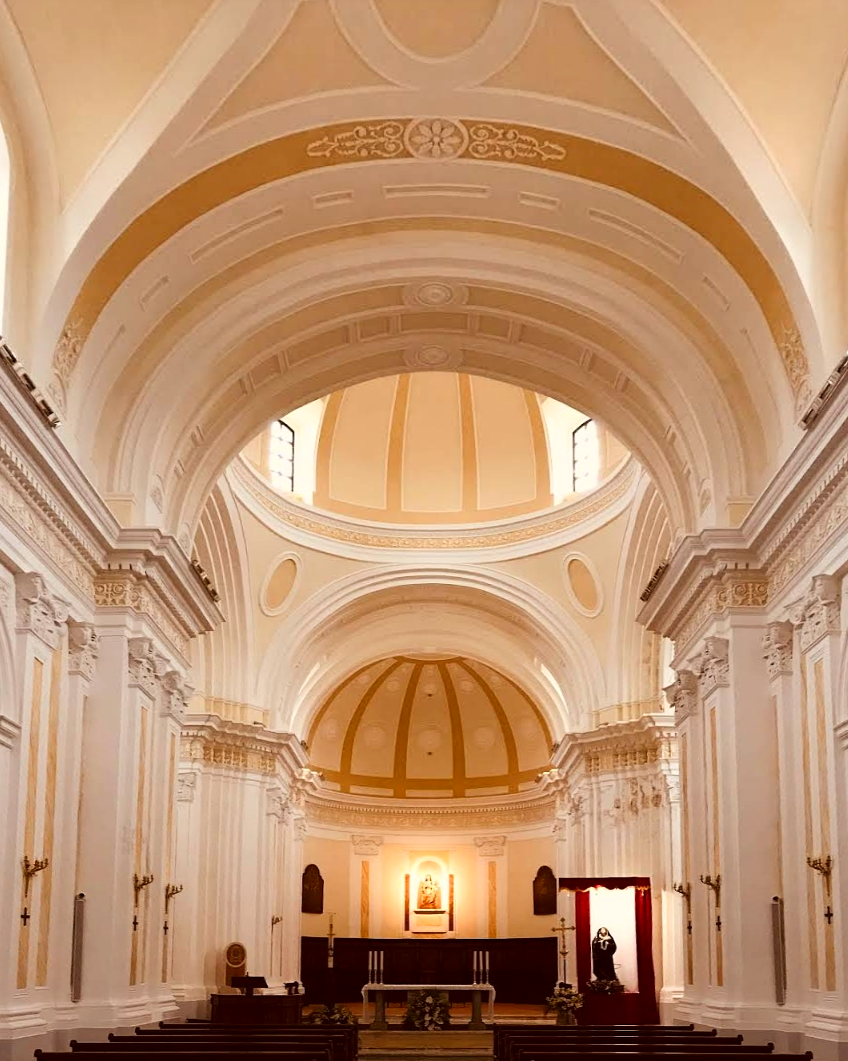
Saint George the Martyr Cathedral inside

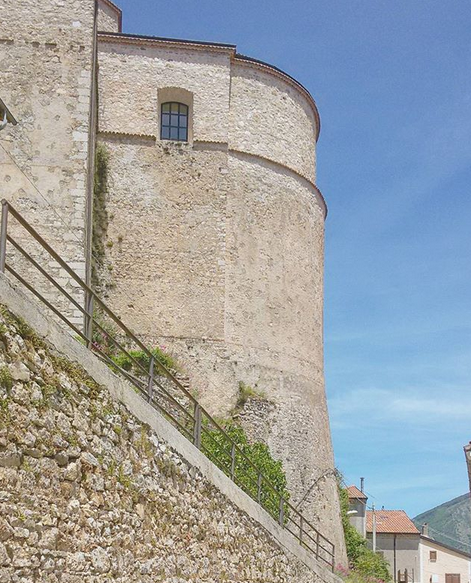
Saint George the Martyr Cathedral

Churches

The Co-Cathedral of Saint George the Martyr, originally dedicated in 1131, was constructed on Civita hill to replace the earlier Church of San Michele Arcangelo. The building consists of a single nave with side chapels, a dome, and a bell tower. It has sustained repeated earthquake damage and has been restored on multiple occasions, most recently after 1980. It preserves relics of Saint Gianuario, the town's patron saint, and artworks including a statue by Giacomo Colombo (1714).

The Church of San Michele Arcangelo, of Lombard origin, may have served as the cathedral until 1131. It is notable for its Gothic portal, attributed to Melchiorre da Montalbano (13th century) and now classified as a national monument. The interior contains frescoes, a baptismal font, and an 18th-century painting depicting the expulsion of angels.

The Church of San Gianuario, formerly the Abbey of Santo Stefano Protomartire, is located on Civita hill and was built over a pre-existing temple of Serapis. The relics of Saint Gianuario were transferred here in 853. The church houses works from the 17th and 18th centuries, including paintings by Giovanni De Gregorio, known as il Pietrafesa, and by Francesco Oliva (Peccheneda). It has undergone multiple reconstructions following earthquakes and structural collapses.

The Church of Santa Maria di Costantinopoli, also known as del Ponte, was established in 1593 along the Via Herculea near the Agri River. Built around a votive shrine, it contains frescoes, a stone altar with baldachin, and an icon of the Madonna associated with local devotional tradition.

Other religious buildings include:

- San Marco (1270), containing a baptismal font and a bronze Greek cross.
- San Rocco (18th century), which preserves artworks originating from a destroyed church.
- Santo Spirito, once annexed to the Pignatelli palace, containing a Neapolitan polyptych.
- Sant’Antonio Abate, in a state of disrepair.

Archaeological evidence of religious sites has been identified at the Annunziata Chapel, Santa Caterina (where a necropolis was uncovered), San Cristoforo (proto-Villanovan burials), Santa Maria della Stella, and San Giovanni (temple of Pan).

Monasteries and Convents

The former Monastery of San Tommaso, later adapted as Palazzo Manzoni on Casale hill, originated as a Benedictine convent and possibly served as a military outpost. According to tradition, it hosted visits from Thomas Aquinas. The building currently houses the offices of the Lucanian Apennine National Park.

The Capuchin Monastery, founded in 1560, was among the earliest in Basilicata; it is now disused and in a state of decay.

The Monastery of San Francesco, founded in 1330 on Civita hill over the ruins of a castle, was suppressed in the modern era. Its adjacent church has been adapted for use as a museum and oratory.

The Monastery of San Giacomo, founded in 1340 and suppressed in 1652, has been largely lost; only a small chapel dedicated to the Madonna delle Grazie remains.

Palaces and Fortifications

The Rocchetta Sanseverino was constructed on San Giovanni hill, replacing the earlier central castle destroyed in 1142. It served as a fortified residence of the Sanseverino family, who held the county of Marsico for several centuries.

The Palazzo Pignatelli, built in 1670, later served as the town hall and public library. Designed in Renaissance style, it features an internal courtyard and incorporates Roman cippi.

The Palazzo Barrese Li Prati (also known as Palazzo Boccia) was associated with both the Pignatelli and Sanseverino families. The structure integrates two towers and sections of the medieval walls. Despite damage from revolts and earthquakes, it has survived and is now municipal property.
