= Missanello =

- Comune
- Comune di Missanello
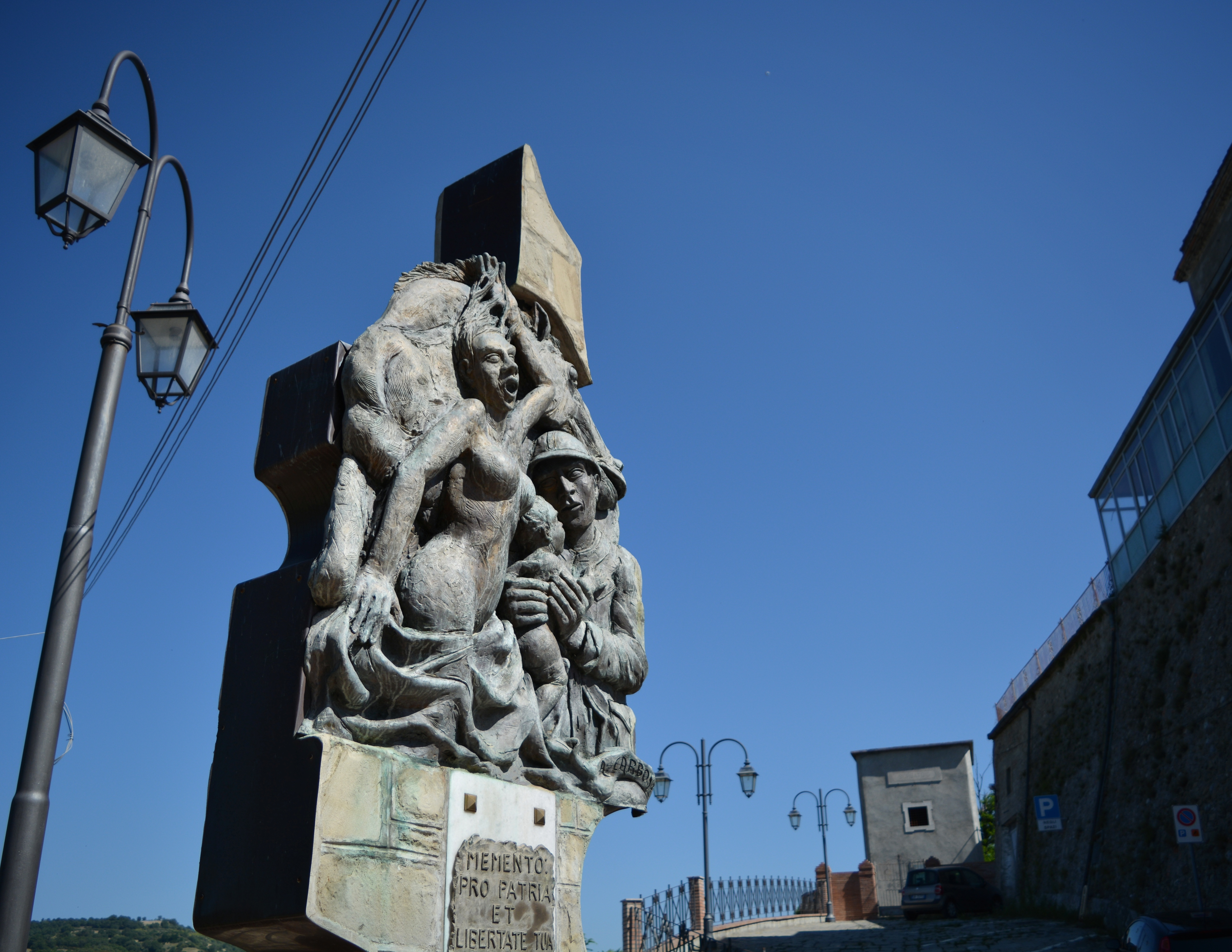
- View of Missanello

- Coat of arms

- Location of Missanello in Italy Missanello (Basilicata)
- Coordinates: 40°17′N 16°10′E
- Country: Italy
- Region: Basilicata
- Province: Potenza (PZ)

Government
  - Mayor: Filippo Sinisgalli

Area
  - Total: 22.34 km^{2} (8.63 sq mi)
- Elevation: 604 m (1,982 ft)

Population (31 December 2010)
  - Total: 572
  - Density: 25.6/km^{2} (66.3/sq mi)
- Demonym: Missanellesi
- Time zone: UTC+1 (CET)
  - Summer (DST): UTC+2 (CEST)
- Postal code: 85010
- Dialing code: 0971
- ISTAT code: 076049
- Patron saint: St. Nicholas
- Saint day: 6 December
- Website: Official website

Missanello (Lucano: Missanìdde) is a town and comune in the province of Potenza, in the Southern Italian region of Basilicata.
