= Antonio Andrisani =

Italian filmmaker and director

Antonio Andrisani (born 1966) is an Italian filmmaker and director.

Andrisani was born at Matera. Inspired by the works of Stanley Kubrick, he has created a number of significant cinematographic works, including La Ragazza nel Bar (The Girl in the Bar), La Sosta (The Stop), Il Garante (The Guarantee), 31, La Mosca (The Fly), Ecco perciò (Here therefore), Al proprio posto (To his own place), Il numero uno (The number one).

He wrote the screenplay for the latest Silvia Ferreri movie, still editing, Lo stallo (The stall), where he also plays the main role together with Rolando Ravello and Pierfrancesco "Titizzo" Natale.
