= Monte Volturino =

Mountain in Italy

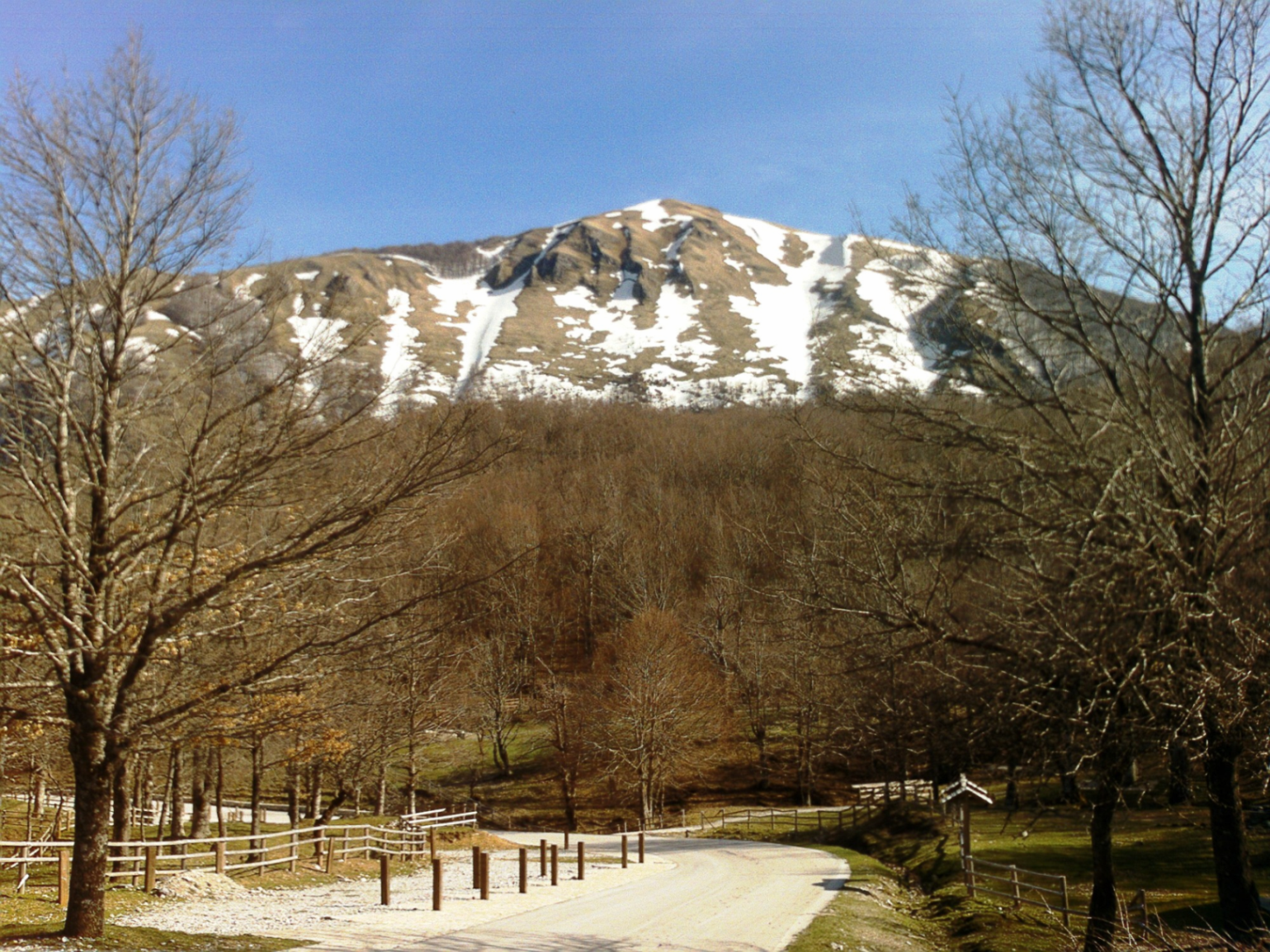

Highest point
- Elevation: 1,835 m (6,020 ft)
- Prominence: 912 m (2,992 ft)
- Coordinates: 40°24′45″N 15°48′35″E

Geography
- Location within Italy
- Location: Basilicata, Italy
- Parent range: Southern Apennines

Monte Volturino is a mountain of Basilicata, southern Italy.

== Flora and Fauna ==
Monte Volturino was designated as a Special Protection Area (SPA) by the European Union Birds Directive. The site features 89 Nature directives' species, including the Italian crested newt, four-lined snake, Italian sparrow, rock partridge, Eurasian hoopoe, and European bee-eater. Flora includes silver poplar, white willow, Turkey oak, and sweet chestnut.
