= Viggiano =

- Comune
- Comune di Viggiano
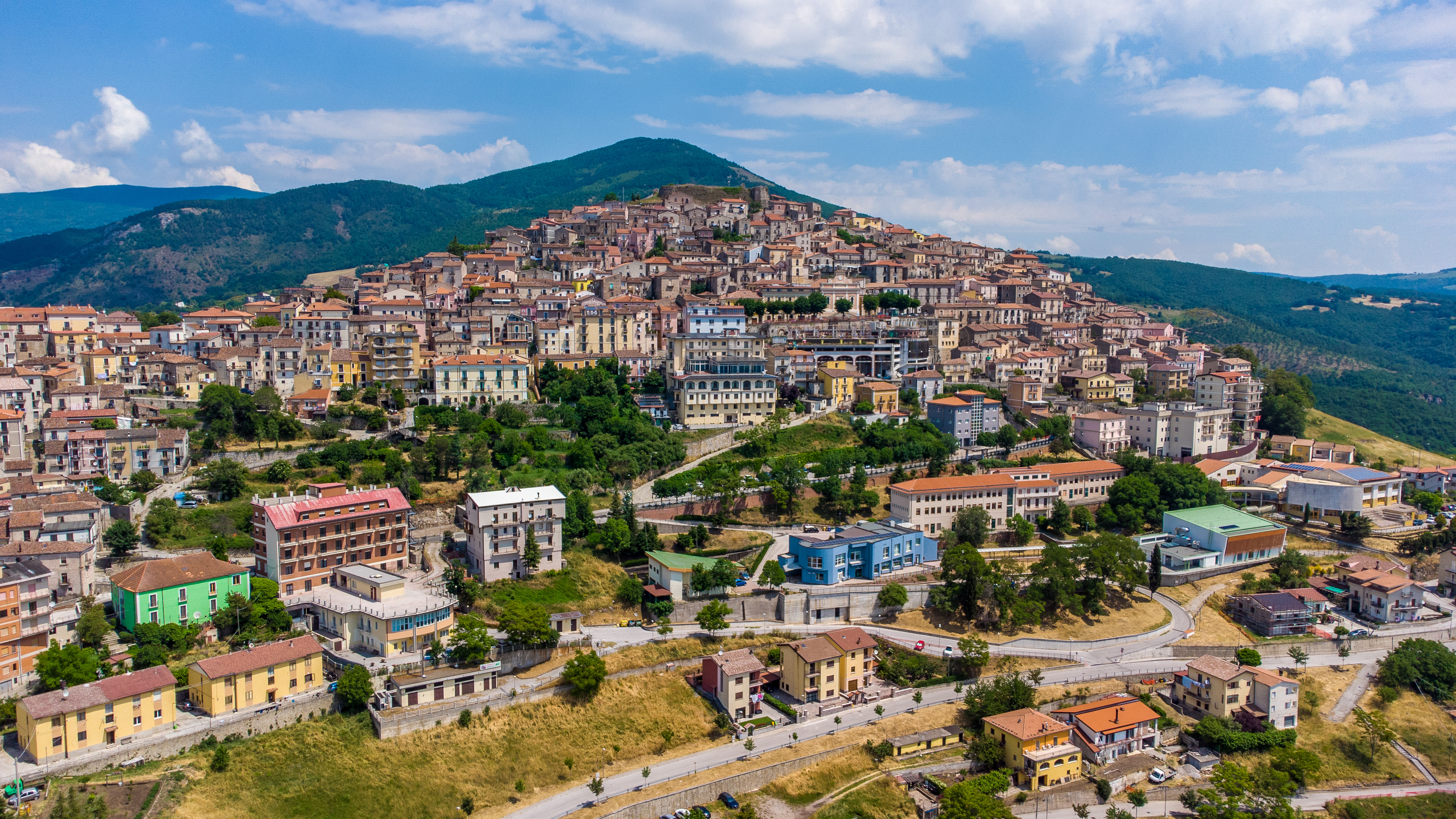
- View of Viggiano

- Coat of arms

- Location within Italy Location within Basilicata
- Coordinates: 40°20′N 15°54′E
- Country: Italy
- Region: Basilicata
- Province: Potenza (PZ)

Government
  - Mayor: Amedeo Cicala

Area
  - Total: 89.03 km^{2} (34.37 sq mi)
- Elevation: 975 m (3,199 ft)

Population (1996)
  - Total: 3,148
  - Density: 35.36/km^{2} (91.58/sq mi)
- Demonym: Viggianesi
- Time zone: UTC+1 (CET)
  - Summer (DST): UTC+2 (CEST)
- Postal code: 85059
- Dialing code: 0975
- ISTAT code: 076098
- Patron saint: Saint Peter
- Saint day: April 7
- Website: Official website

Viggiano is a comune in the province of Potenza, in the Southern Italian region of Basilicata. It is bounded by the comuni of Calvello, Corleto Perticara, Grumento Nova, Laurenzana, Marsicovetere, and Montemurro.

Viggiano is known for migrant street musicians who have brought their music to Italy and worldwide through the centuries, as well as renowned for the construction of harps. Many Viggianesi had the opportunity to play in many symphonic orchestras in Europe, United States and Australia. The street musicians from Viggiano are cited as an influence on Hector Malot's Sans Famille.

Today Viggiano is known to be home to Europe's largest onshore hydrocarbon field that makes Italy the third-largest oil producer of the continent, behind Norway and United Kingdom.

The comune hosted from 1997 to 2013 the International Flute Competition "Leonardo De Lorenzo", some the jury members over the years included Jean-Pierre Rampal, Julius Baker, Jindřich Feld, Susan Milan, Carol Wincenc, and Ransom Wilson.

== People linked to Viggiano ==
- Leonardo De Lorenzo - flautist and music educator
- Victor Salvi - harp maker
- Mark Bresciano - football player
- Billie Joe Armstrong - musician
- Francesco Ferramosca - violinist
- Giuseppe Truda - violinist, conductor, composer, teacher

== Demographics ==
Historical population

Year	Pop.	±%
1861	5,731	—
1871	6,188	+8.0%
1881	6,030	−2.6%
1901	4,351	−27.8%
1911	4,030	−7.4%
1921	3,777	−6.3%
1931	3,870	+2.5%
1936	4,046	+4.5%

Year	Pop.	±%
1951	4,152	+2.6%
1961	4,039	−2.7%
1971	3,179	−21.3%
1981	3,088	−2.9%
1991	3,161	+2.4%
2001	3,208	+1.5%
2011	3,122	−2.7%
