= Grumento Nova =

- Comune
- Comune di Grumento Nova
- View of Grumento Nova

- Location within Italy Location within Basilicata
- Coordinates: 40°17′N 15°53′E
- Country: Italy
- Region: Basilicata
- Province: Potenza (PZ)

Government
  - Mayor: Vincenzo Vertunni

Area
  - Total: 66.17 km^{2} (25.55 sq mi)
- Elevation: 771 m (2,530 ft)

Population (Dec. 2004)
  - Total: 1,837
  - Density: 27.76/km^{2} (71.90/sq mi)
- Demonym: Grumentini
- Time zone: UTC+1 (CET)
  - Summer (DST): UTC+2 (CEST)
- Postal code: 85050
- Dialing code: 0975
- ISTAT code: 076037
- Website: Official website

Grumento Nova is a town and comune in the province of Potenza, in the Southern Italian region of Basilicata. The ancient name of the town was Saponara.

In the locality Spineta are the remains of the Roman town of Grumentum.
