= Tramutola =

- Comune
- Comune di Tramutola
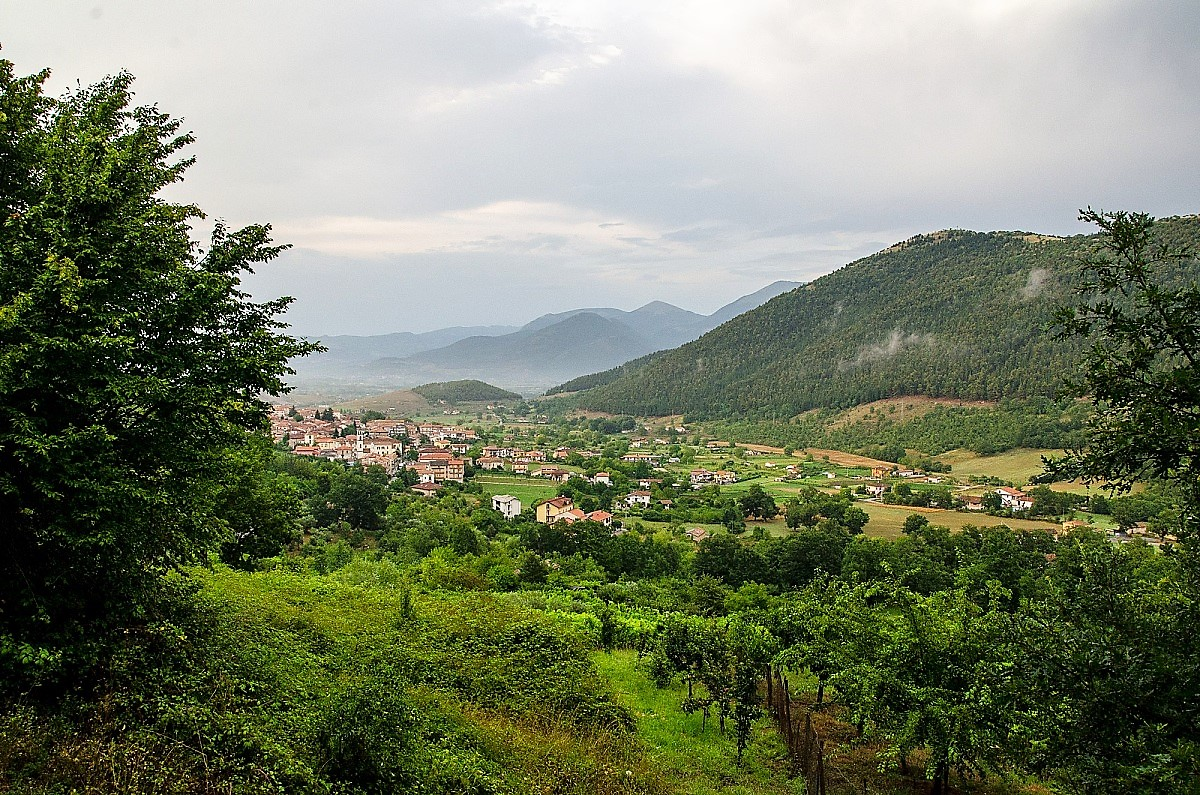

- Coat of arms

- Location within Italy Location within Basilicata
- Coordinates: 40°19′N 15°47′E
- Country: Italy
- Region: Basilicata
- Province: Potenza (PZ)

Government
  - Mayor: Luigi Marotta

Area
  - Total: 36.48 km^{2} (14.09 sq mi)
- Elevation: 650 m (2,130 ft)

Population (31 January 2013)
  - Total: 3,149
  - Density: 86.32/km^{2} (223.6/sq mi)
- Demonym: Tramutolesi
- Time zone: UTC+1 (CET)
  - Summer (DST): UTC+2 (CEST)
- Postal code: 85057
- Dialing code: 0975
- ISTAT code: 076091
- Website: Official website

Tramutola (Lucano: Tramùtele) is a village and comune in the province of Potenza, in the Southern Italian region of Basilicata (otherwise known as Lucania).
