= List of municipalities of Basilicata =

The following is a list of the municipalities (comuni) of the region of Basilicata in Italy.

There are 131 municipalities in Basilicata as of 2026:

- 100 in the Province of Potenza
- 31 in the Province of Matera

== List ==
Municipality	Province	Population (2026)	Area (km²)	Density
Abriola	Potenza	1,195	97.19	12.3
Accettura	Matera	1,575	90.37	17.4
Acerenza	Potenza	2,007	77.64	25.9
Albano di Lucania	Potenza	1,275	55.87	22.8
Aliano	Matera	804	98.41	8.2
Anzi	Potenza	1,445	77.10	18.7
Armento	Potenza	535	58.98	9.1
Atella	Potenza	3,574	88.48	40.4
Avigliano	Potenza	10,318	85.48	120.7
Balvano	Potenza	1,650	42.15	39.1
Banzi	Potenza	1,131	83.06	13.6
Baragiano	Potenza	2,477	29.60	83.7
Barile	Potenza	2,491	24.13	103.2
Bella	Potenza	4,530	99.71	45.4
Bernalda	Matera	11,922	126.19	94.5
Brienza	Potenza	3,844	82.94	46.3
Brindisi Montagna	Potenza	757	59.88	12.6
Calciano	Matera	616	49.69	12.4
Calvello	Potenza	1,709	106.40	16.1
Calvera	Potenza	347	16.01	21.7
Campomaggiore	Potenza	689	12.48	55.2
Cancellara	Potenza	1,088	42.50	25.6
Carbone	Potenza	475	48.53	9.8
Castelgrande	Potenza	783	34.90	22.4
Castelluccio Inferiore	Potenza	1,854	28.96	64.0
Castelluccio Superiore	Potenza	703	32.98	21.3
Castelmezzano	Potenza	684	33.91	20.2
Castelsaraceno	Potenza	1,112	74.78	14.9
Castronuovo di Sant'Andrea	Potenza	833	47.45	17.6
Cersosimo	Potenza	496	24.75	20.0
Chiaromonte	Potenza	1,685	70.02	24.1
Cirigliano	Matera	279	14.90	18.7
Colobraro	Matera	1,014	66.61	15.2
Corleto Perticara	Potenza	2,303	89.34	25.8
Craco	Matera	570	77.04	7.4
Episcopia	Potenza	1,188	28.64	41.5
Fardella	Potenza	568	29.08	19.5
Ferrandina	Matera	7,813	218.11	35.8
Filiano	Potenza	2,609	71.81	36.3
Forenza	Potenza	1,726	116.31	14.8
Francavilla in Sinni	Potenza	3,823	46.82	81.7
Gallicchio	Potenza	747	23.63	31.6
Garaguso	Matera	887	38.61	23.0
Genzano di Lucania	Potenza	5,036	208.93	24.1
Ginestra	Potenza	655	13.32	49.2
Gorgoglione	Matera	828	34.93	23.7
Grassano	Matera	4,530	41.63	108.8
Grottole	Matera	1,935	117.15	16.5
Grumento Nova	Potenza	1,514	66.65	22.7
Guardia Perticara	Potenza	502	53.68	9.4
Irsina	Matera	4,292	263.47	16.3
Lagonegro	Potenza	4,905	113.07	43.4
Latronico	Potenza	3,950	76.66	51.5
Laurenzana	Potenza	1,528	95.71	16.0
Lauria	Potenza	11,651	176.63	66.0
Lavello	Potenza	12,820	134.67	95.2
Maratea	Potenza	4,514	67.84	66.5
Marsico Nuovo	Potenza	3,680	100.97	36.4
Marsicovetere	Potenza	5,680	38.01	149.4
Maschito	Potenza	1,398	45.82	30.5
Matera	Matera	59,368	392.09	151.4
Melfi	Potenza	16,804	206.23	81.5
Miglionico	Matera	2,336	88.84	26.3
Missanello	Potenza	464	22.34	20.8
Moliterno	Potenza	3,487	98.55	35.4
Montalbano Jonico	Matera	6,461	136.00	47.5
Montemilone	Potenza	1,371	114.14	12.0
Montemurro	Potenza	1,021	56.87	18.0
Montescaglioso	Matera	9,197	175.79	52.3
Muro Lucano	Potenza	4,828	126.18	38.3
Nemoli	Potenza	1,367	19.49	70.1
Noepoli	Potenza	717	46.71	15.4
Nova Siri	Matera	6,848	52.75	129.8
Oliveto Lucano	Matera	328	31.19	10.5
Oppido Lucano	Potenza	3,468	54.88	63.2
Palazzo San Gervasio	Potenza	4,249	62.91	67.5
Paterno	Potenza	2,951	40.74	72.4
Pescopagano	Potenza	1,597	69.84	22.9
Picerno	Potenza	5,581	78.51	71.1
Pietragalla	Potenza	3,742	66.10	56.6
Pietrapertosa	Potenza	848	67.70	12.5
Pignola	Potenza	6,755	56.24	120.1
Pisticci	Matera	16,494	233.67	70.6
Policoro	Matera	17,727	67.66	262.0
Pomarico	Matera	3,657	129.67	28.2
Potenza	Potenza	63,403	175.43	361.4
Rapolla	Potenza	4,080	29.87	136.6
Rapone	Potenza	827	29.51	28.0
Rionero in Vulture	Potenza	12,325	53.52	230.3
Ripacandida	Potenza	1,528	33.49	45.6
Rivello	Potenza	2,417	69.58	34.7
Roccanova	Potenza	1,235	61.74	20.0
Rotonda	Potenza	3,100	42.92	72.2
Rotondella	Matera	2,309	76.72	30.1
Ruoti	Potenza	3,164	55.45	57.1
Ruvo del Monte	Potenza	935	32.62	28.7
Salandra	Matera	2,391	77.44	30.9
San Chirico Nuovo	Potenza	1,076	23.39	46.0
San Chirico Raparo	Potenza	865	84.07	10.3
San Costantino Albanese	Potenza	569	43.25	13.2
San Fele	Potenza	2,493	97.70	25.5
San Giorgio Lucano	Matera	986	39.26	25.1
San Martino d'Agri	Potenza	615	50.39	12.2
San Mauro Forte	Matera	1,168	87.06	13.4
San Paolo Albanese	Potenza	197	30.22	6.5
San Severino Lucano	Potenza	1,313	61.16	21.5
Sant'Angelo Le Fratte	Potenza	1,293	23.10	56.0
Sant'Arcangelo	Potenza	5,922	89.10	66.5
Sarconi	Potenza	1,421	30.69	46.3
Sasso di Castalda	Potenza	721	45.43	15.9
Satriano di Lucania	Potenza	2,245	32.90	68.2
Savoia di Lucania	Potenza	959	32.84	29.2
Scanzano Jonico	Matera	7,475	72.18	103.6
Senise	Potenza	6,360	97.31	65.4
Spinoso	Potenza	1,259	38.18	33.0
Stigliano	Matera	3,369	211.15	16.0
Teana	Potenza	499	19.30	25.9
Terranova di Pollino	Potenza	951	113.07	8.4
Tito	Potenza	7,002	71.27	98.2
Tolve	Potenza	2,843	128.69	22.1
Tramutola	Potenza	2,812	36.65	76.7
Trecchina	Potenza	2,054	38.19	53.8
Tricarico	Matera	4,629	178.16	26.0
Trivigno	Potenza	593	26.00	22.8
Tursi	Matera	4,659	159.93	29.1
Vaglio Basilicata	Potenza	1,754	43.36	40.5
Valsinni	Matera	1,287	32.22	39.9
Venosa	Potenza	10,560	170.39	62.0
Vietri di Potenza	Potenza	2,614	52.25	50.0
Viggianello	Potenza	2,577	120.83	21.3
Viggiano	Potenza	3,212	89.70	35.8

== See also ==
- List of municipalities of Italy
