= List of municipalities of the province of Matera =

The following is a list of the 31 municipalities (comuni) of the Province of Matera in the region of Basilicata in Italy.

== List ==
Municipality	Population (2026)	Area (km²)	Density
Accettura	1,575	90.37	17.4
Aliano	804	98.41	8.2
Bernalda	11,922	126.19	94.5
Calciano	616	49.69	12.4
Cirigliano	279	14.90	18.7
Colobraro	1,014	66.61	15.2
Craco	570	77.04	7.4
Ferrandina	7,813	218.11	35.8
Garaguso	887	38.61	23.0
Gorgoglione	828	34.93	23.7
Grassano	4,530	41.63	108.8
Grottole	1,935	117.15	16.5
Irsina	4,292	263.47	16.3
Matera	59,368	392.09	151.4
Miglionico	2,336	88.84	26.3
Montalbano Jonico	6,461	136.00	47.5
Montescaglioso	9,197	175.79	52.3
Nova Siri	6,848	52.75	129.8
Oliveto Lucano	328	31.19	10.5
Pisticci	16,494	233.67	70.6
Policoro	17,727	67.66	262.0
Pomarico	3,657	129.67	28.2
Rotondella	2,309	76.72	30.1
Salandra	2,391	77.44	30.9
San Giorgio Lucano	986	39.26	25.1
San Mauro Forte	1,168	87.06	13.4
Scanzano Jonico	7,475	72.18	103.6
Stigliano	3,369	211.15	16.0
Tricarico	4,629	178.16	26.0
Tursi	4,659	159.93	29.1
Valsinni	1,287	32.22	39.9

== See also ==
- List of municipalities of Basilicata
- List of municipalities of Italy
