= Cavone =

Location
- Country: Italy

Physical characteristics
- Mouth: Gulf of Taranto
  - coordinates: 40.2890°N 16.7774°E
- Length: 49 km (30 mi)
- Basin size: 675 km^{2} (261 sq mi)

The Cavone (in its upper course: Salandrella) is a river in the Basilicata region of southern Italy. It is 49 kilometres (30 mi) long, and has a drainage basin of 675 square kilometres (261 sq mi). Its source is west of Accettura in the province of Matera near the border with the province of Potenza. The river flows northeast near Oliveto Lucano and Garaguso before curving southeast. It flows near Salandra and San Mauro Forte before being joined by a right tributary. The river is joined by a left tributary north of Craco. It flows southeast near Pisticci and empties into the Gulf of Taranto.
