= Accettura =

- Comune
- Comune di Accettura
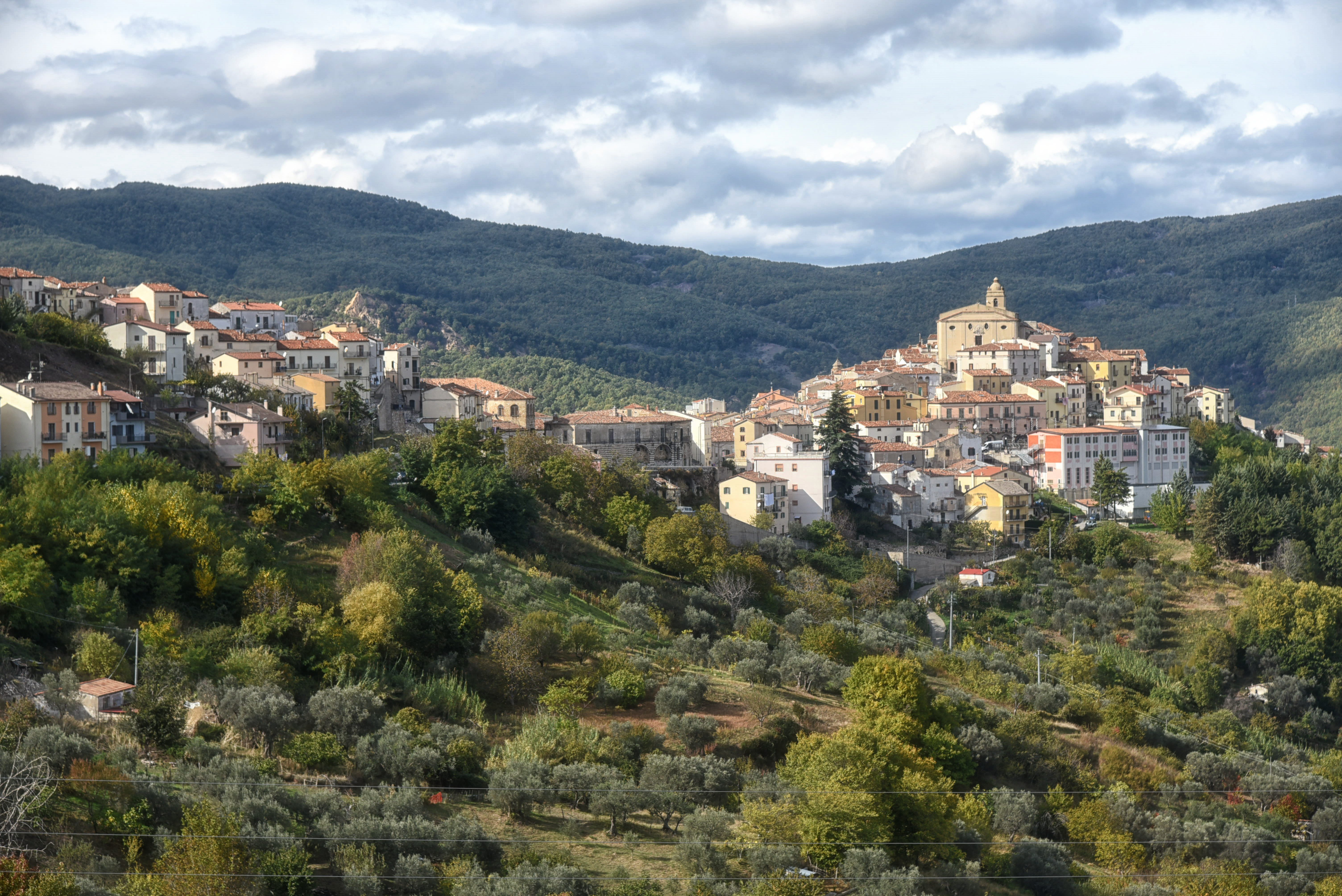
- View of Accettura

- Coat of arms

- Location of Accettura in Italy Accettura (Basilicata)
- Coordinates: 40°29′33″N 16°9′27″E
- Country: Italy
- Region: Basilicata
- Province: Matera (MT)

Government
  - Mayor: Alfonso Vespe (Per Accettura)

Area
  - Total: 90.37 km^{2} (34.89 sq mi)
- Elevation: 770 m (2,530 ft)

Population (31 December 2025)
  - Total: 1,575
  - Density: 17.43/km^{2} (45.14/sq mi)
- Demonym: Accetturesi
- Time zone: UTC+1 (CET)
  - Summer (DST): UTC+2 (CEST)
- Postal code: 75011
- Dialing code: 0835
- ISTAT code: 077001
- Website: Official website

Accettura is a town and comune in the province of Matera, in the Southern Italian region of Basilicata. It is bordered by the comuni of Calciano, Campomaggiore, Cirigliano, Oliveto Lucano, Pietrapertosa, San Mauro Forte and Stigliano.

== Geography ==
The territory is half covered by forests and pastures. Around the commune there are the Manche, Gallipoli, Montepiano, Vallefredda and Tempacortaglie mountains. Accettura is 770 metres (2,530 ft) above sea level and is bordered to the north with the comunes of Campomaggiore and Calciano, to the east with Oliveto Lucano and San Mauro Forte, to the south with Stigliano and Cirigliano, and to the west with Pietrapertosa (PZ).

== Etymology ==
The term, according to some, is derived from the theme of the word "acceptor", which in Latin is Accipiter. For others, it stems from the symbol of the country, to accept a small plot of land, etc.

== History ==
The first official mention of Accettura in documents was by Pope Nicholas II in 1060, who sent a document sent to the bishop of Tricarico, referring to it as "Achitorem".

Situated in the Appennino Lucano in the Gallipoli-Cognato Park, was founded in the 10th century after the local population had abandoned three neighbouring villages. Nowadays the population work mainly in agriculture, stock-breeding and tourism.

In the tenth century was a feudal territory of Montescaglioso. In 1272, the town was completely destroyed by fire. Shortly after, Charles I of Anjou ordered its reconstruction.

Throughout its history, Accettura was owned by several families: Bazzano, Della Marra, the Ponsiaco, the Carafa, and the Spinelli who held it until the late nineteenth century.

== Festival of Maggio di Accettura ==
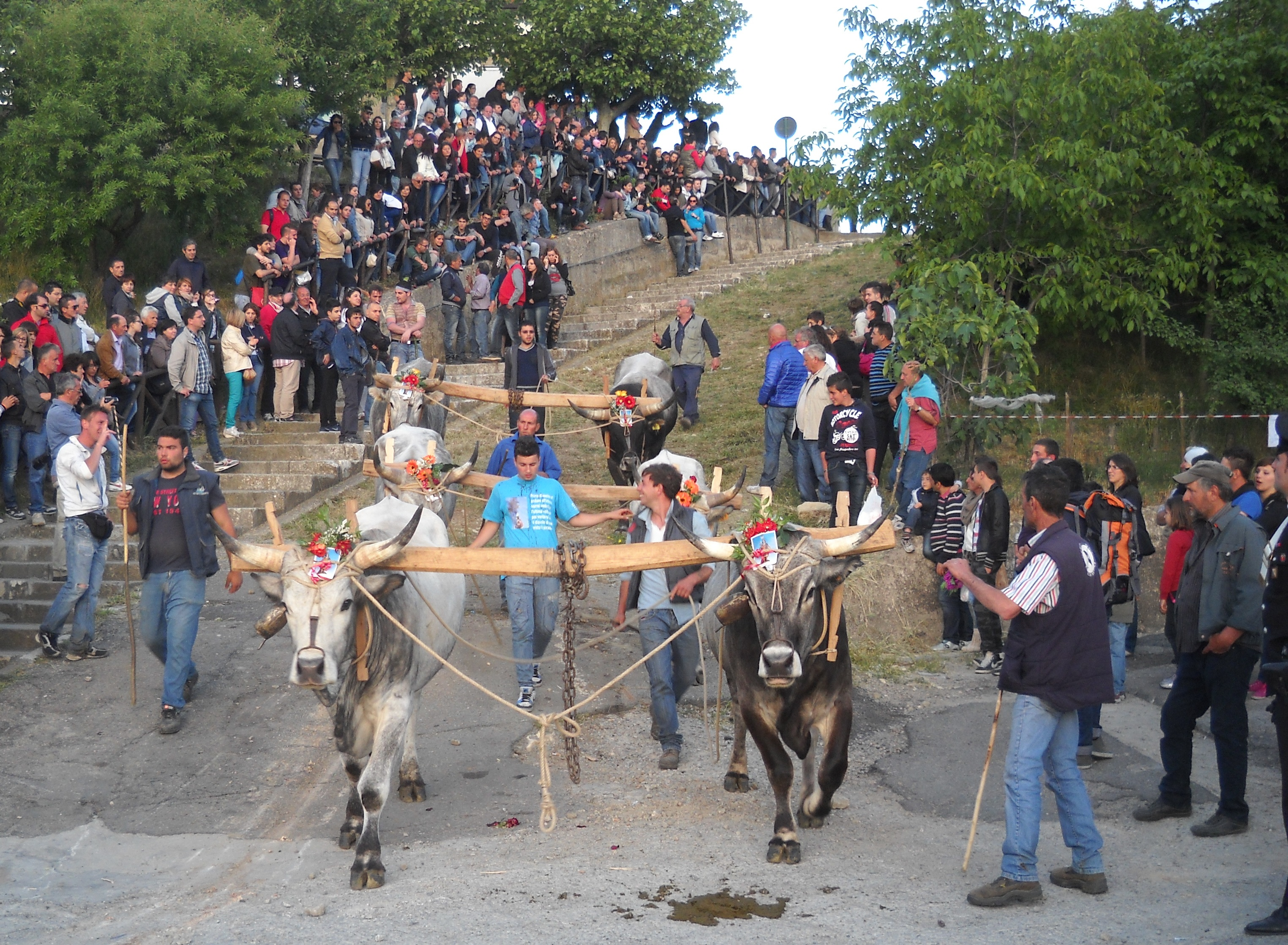
Maggio di Accettura, 2013

The St. Julian festival in Accettura, known locally as "Maggio di Accettura" or simply "Maggio", ("maypole"), is a local festival celebrated around Pentecost, attracting both the village population and visitors. It begins with extensive preparations and side events, including processions featuring statues of the patron saint, Saint Julian, and paintings of saints John and Paul.

The festival peaks as a large oak, stripped of branches, is raised in the village square, with a smaller wood attached. This event features traditional dances, performances, ceremonial offerings, and fireworks displays.

The festival blends agricultural pagan traditions with Catholic elements and may trace its origins back to Lombard migration to the area.

== Main sights ==
=== Religious buildings ===
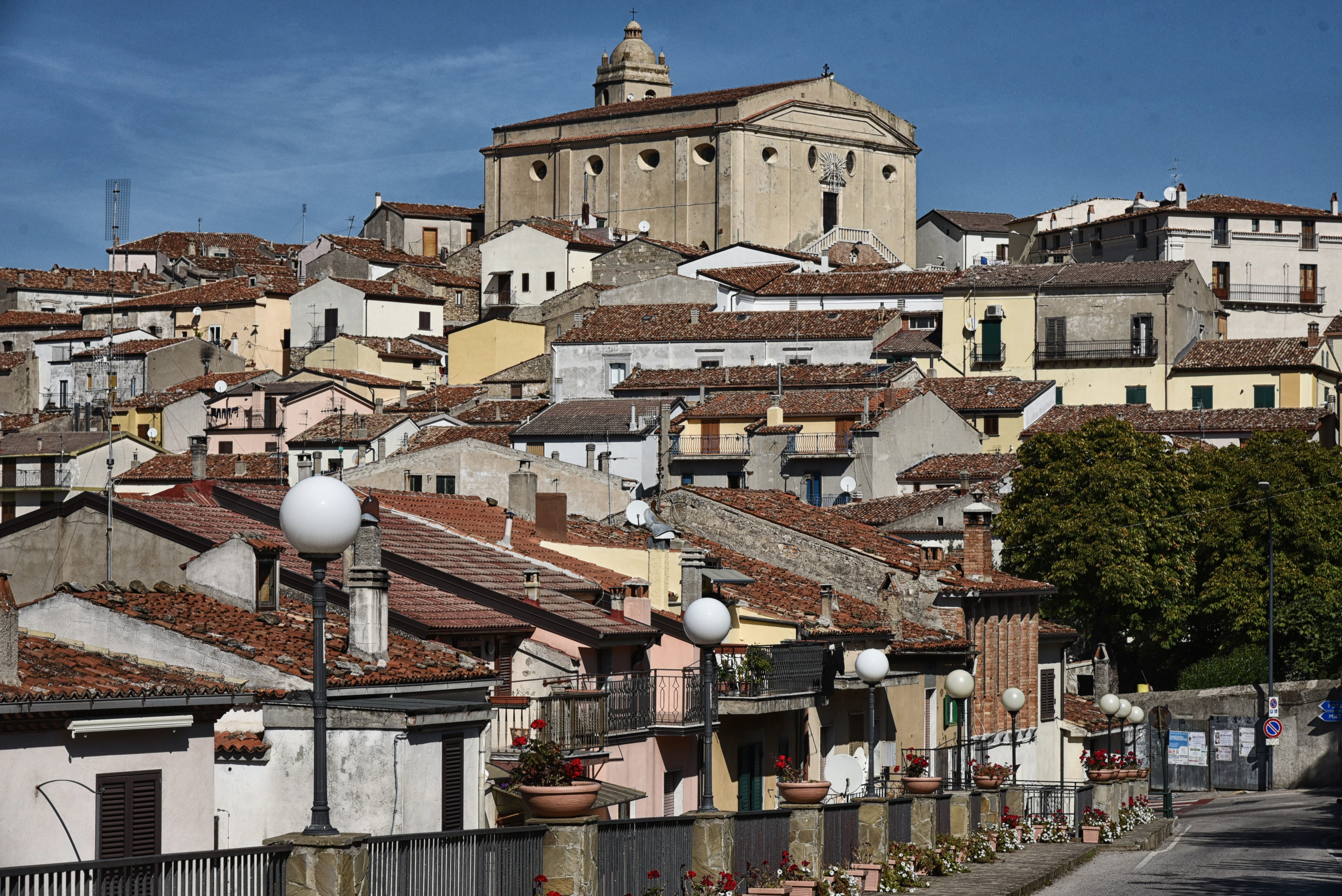
Accettura's historical center

- Church of the Annunciation - a church in the Baroque style, was rebuilt on an existing building. Inside, is a wooden statue of the Madonna with Jesus from about the sixteenth century and a painting of that period, depicting the same subject. Also of interest is the window of the church, dating from the fourteenth century.
- Cathedral Church of St. Nicola - Dated to before the fifteenth century, it has undergone numerous periods of renovation. Of particular interest is the bell cast in 1611 by Gaspare di Missanello, the wooden crucifix (15th century), the wooden statues of San Antonio (16th century), San Julian, Santa Filomena, San Pasquale (mid-eighteenth century) and a canvas of Mary Magdalene (late 18th century).
- Church of St. Antonio - Used to be a Franciscan friary. It has preserved paintings of the seventeenth century, probably of the Pietrafesa.
- Chapel of Saint Giovanni e Paolo, in Valdienna.
- Chapel of Santa Maria - Dating back to the eighteenth century in Ermoli.
- Church of St. Chiara de Gallipoli - It preserves paintings which date back to the sixteenth century.

=== Other buildings ===
- Palaces of the noble families Amodio, Spagna and Nota.
- Masseria Spagna and Masseria De Luca -fortified farms dated to the eighteenth century.

=== Natural attractions ===
Montepiano woods cover the territory of four communes in this region of Italy, Accettura, Cirigliano, Stigliano and Pietrapertosa. Inside were found numerous remains of fortifications, some of them as old as the third of fourth century BC.

- Gallipoli-Cognato Forest Reserve - a nature reserve which is located in the archaeological area of Monte Croccia, which has preserved remains of walls dating to the sixth and seventh centuries BC.
- Serra Rosa. There are ruins of a castle and other medieval buildings.

The Museo dei culti arborei is located in Accettura and houses an exhibition of paintings, collections of photographs and video of the May festival in Accettura held every year, and tools typical of farming and forestry in the area. The museum offers texts and information on the anthropological and social rituals and the ancient traditions associated with the "cult of beautiful trees" of this area.

== Economy ==
The economy is mainly based on livestock and cereal crops (affecting 73% of cultivated land).

The industrial sector is composed mainly of construction or manufacturing companies and is noted for its production of bricks and tiles, produced traditionally in an old furnace. There are also food companies and a service sector, which relies primarily on retail sales of furniture and food. The town has numerous restaurants and primitive tourism.

=== Notable people ===
- Sebastiano Paradiso, painter and sculptor
- Concetta Carestia Lanciaux
- Francesco Pesce, sculptor

== Sources ==
- Giuseppe Pennetti (1909), Notizie storiche di San Mauro Forte e degli altri paesi del Mandamento, Accettura-Garaguso-Oliveto (in Basilicata), Avellino: tipo-litografia E. Pergola
- F. Boenzi; N. Ciaranfi; P. Pieri (1968), Osservazioni geologiche nei dintorni di Accettura e di Oliveto Lucano (Tav. 200 NE, IV SE e IV NE), Pisa: Pacini Mariotti
- Giovanni Battista Bronzini (1979), Accettura: il contadino, l'albero, il santo, Galatina: Congedo Editore, ISBN 88-7786-173-8
