= Carnival of Satriano di Lucania =

Carnival of Satriano di Lucania Carnevale di Satriano di Lucania
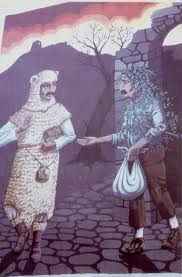
- Mural depicting the legend of the hermit begging the bear for alms
- Status: Active
- Genre: Carnival
- Frequency: Annually
- Location: Satriano di Lucania
- Country: Italy
- Inaugurated: unknown

The Carnival of Satriano (Italian: Carnevale di Satriano), held in Satriano di Lucania, Italy, every February, is one of the country's many carnivals. Held on the Friday, Saturday and Sunday before Fat Tuesday (a Mardi Gras festival), it has been conducted for centuries. The event is among the most important carnival traditions of the region and of Italy and it is unique in that participants wear costumes, or masks, of bears, hermits, or lent.

== History ==
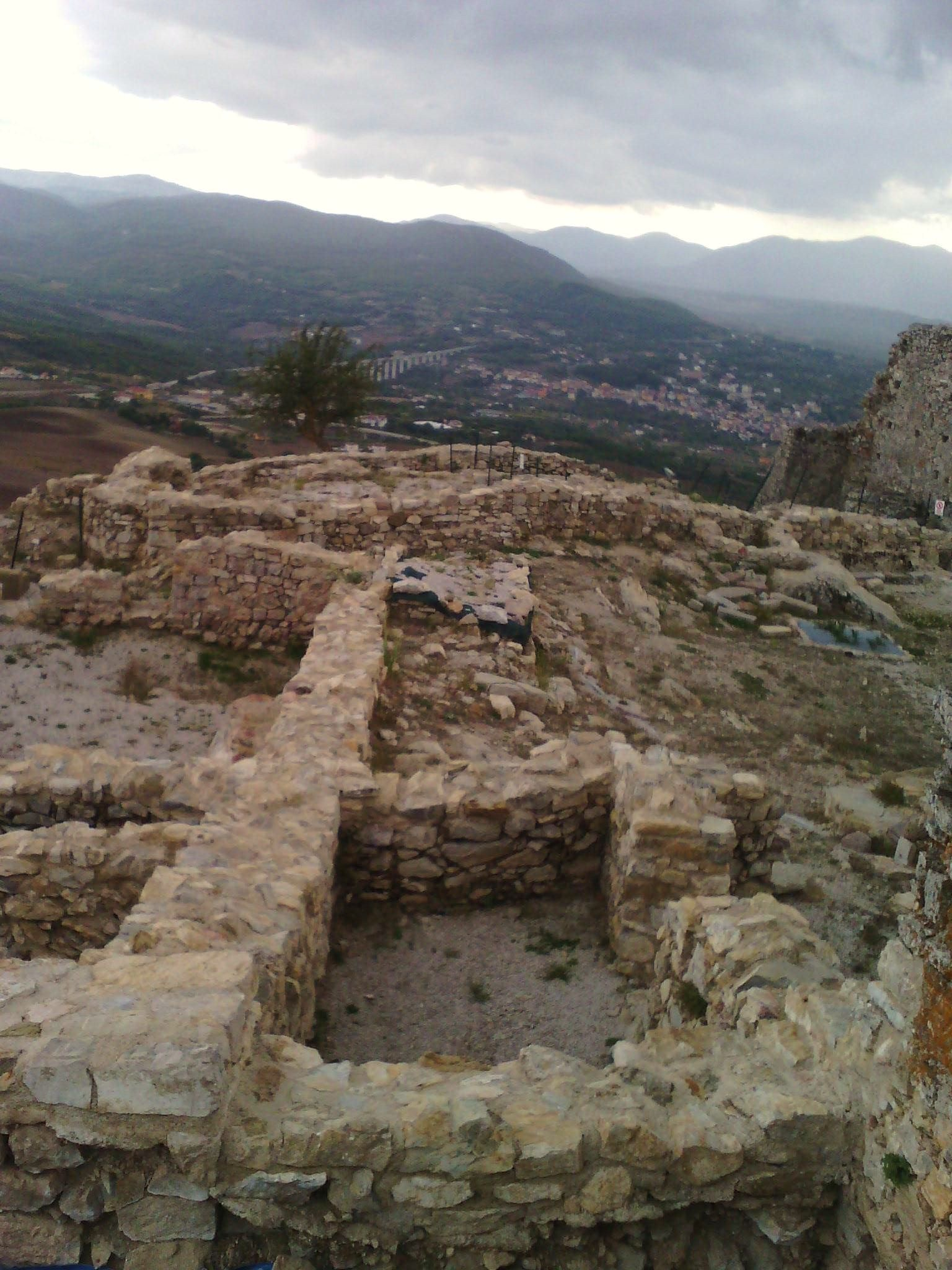
Ruins of Satrianum, after the town was ordered destroyed by Joanna II of Anjou-Durazzo

The carnival has been held for centuries, but its origins are largely unknown. One theory is that it comes from the historical destruction of the ancient town Satrianum by Queen Joanna II of Anjou-Durazzo after an aristocratic girl and protégée of the queen was raped in 1421 by young men wearing goat skins. Three symbols, or masks, represent the nature of the crime. Representing the young men dressed in animal skins are skin-cladden bears. Poverty following the destruction of the town is represented by the hermits and sadness is represented by the lent, the women dressed in black.

Another hypothesis promoted before World War II is that a Franciscan hermit lived in poverty in the woods by the town and came to the town in search of food.

The meaning of the symbolic figures have changed over time. Originally, the bear took revenge for people who have wrongly suffered and disguised himself in the skins of goats and sheep. The hermit, a tree-like man, chose to live in the forest of his homeland rather than migrate to another area. In the past, the hermit received food for visiting homes and silently giving an omen during the festival.

Carnival, little carnival, give me a bit of salami, and if you do not want to give me that, I hope that it soon rots.

— translation of a nursery rhyme

For a period of time, and by 2013, the festival or some of its customs were not observed. Now, the carnival focuses on ecological values.

== The carnival ==
The carnival is organized by the town of Satriano di Lucania in collaboration with Al Parco and the Lucano Apennine National Park. Private companies, associations, and volunteers coordinate efforts to conduct the carnival. It kicks off with a parade of costumed people from Basilicata towns Teana, Cirigliano, Aliano, Montescaglioso, San Mauro Forte, Tricarico, and Lavello on Friday night, and concludes at Abbamonte square, where there are food stands and folk music. In 2017, the parade was televised by Rai Uno's program La vita in diretta. An allegorical parade with people wearing bear, hermit and lent costumes, as well as a wedding procession in which the bride and groom exchange roles, is conducted on Saturday. In it, women dress as men, and men wear women's clothing. Floats are pulled by non-motorized vehicles.

Early Sunday, hermits walk through the streets and herald spring. Later in the day is the "forest walking" in which 131 hermits, representing each of the places in Basilicata, walk into the forest.

Focused on the ecological message of the carnival, trees have been planted to reduce CO_{2} caused by visitors who travel by motorized vehicles. During the carnival, reusable glasses are used, disposable tableware is banned, recycling is encouraged, seasonal foods are used, and promotional material is printed on Forest Stewardship Council paper.

== Masks ==
=== The bear (l'Urs) ===
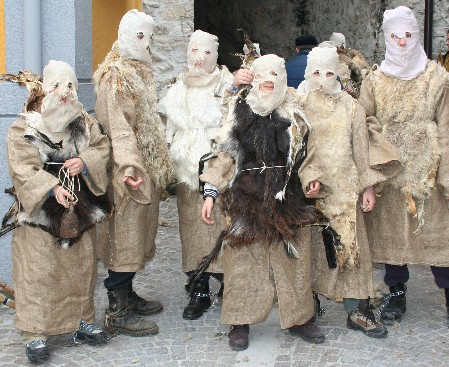
The bear

The bear is a symbol of prosperity, good fortune and success. It represents early citizens who emigrated to distant lands, made a fortune, and acquired symbols of wealth, like fine leathers. Traveling with the bear is a pastor dressed in the traditional clothes of the area and whose task is to keep pace with the bear and ensure that there are not "too many problems" endured by the people. Far from their native land, the bear is practically mute. A bag over his head, with holes for eyes and the mouth, hides the true identity of the person. Around his body are noise-making bells.

=== The hermit (lu Rumita) ===
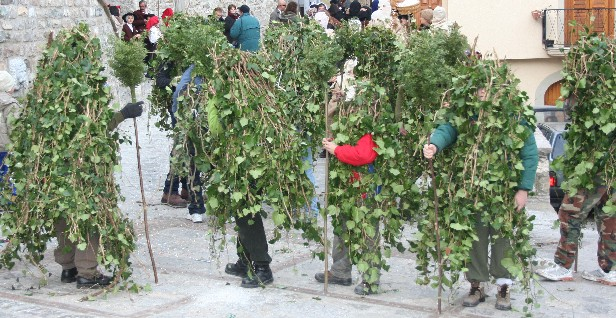
The hermit

Covered in ivy and holding a branch of holly, participants come out of the woods and stroll through the streets of the town, knocking on doors by rubbing branches with frùscio on the door. In return for their bringing hope for spring, they receive a few coins.

If you want good luck, reach into your pocket and do not worry, when you get the hermit touch, give something to him.

— translation of Rumita's nursery rhyme

The hermit is a symbol of poverty and scarcity, who although poor, has remained faithful to the earth or environment. Italian director Michelangelo Frammartino filmed a greenery-clad hermit for a cine-installation Alberi (Trees) that shows the interdependence between man and nature. It was exhibited in New York City at the Museum of Modern Art (MoMa) in 2013.

=== The lent (la Quaresima) ===
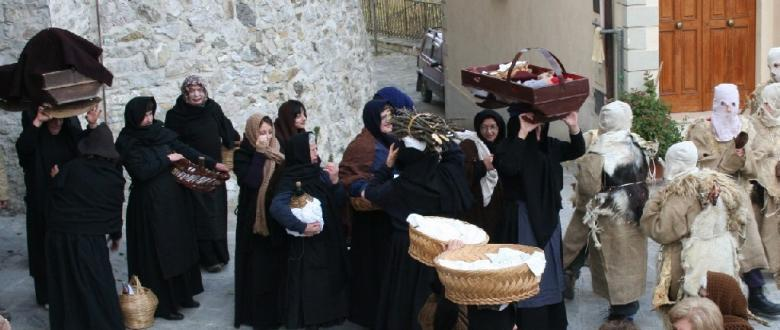
The lent, or the woman in mourning

The "Quaresima", depicted by men and women, represents an old woman dressed in black with a red face drawn from the mouth up to her cheeks. Covered by a black cloak and walking was a cradle on their head containing a child conceived during the Carnival by an unknown father, represents the difficulty that widowed women endured in the past. It proceeds along the streets of the country with slow and melancholy step, repeating shrill and loud words of deep despair.

Lent, cross-eyed from crying, goes door-to-door saying, "Oh my God! I lost my companion."

— translation of Quaresima's nursery rhyme
