= Pietrapertosa =

- Comune
- Comune di Pietrapertosa
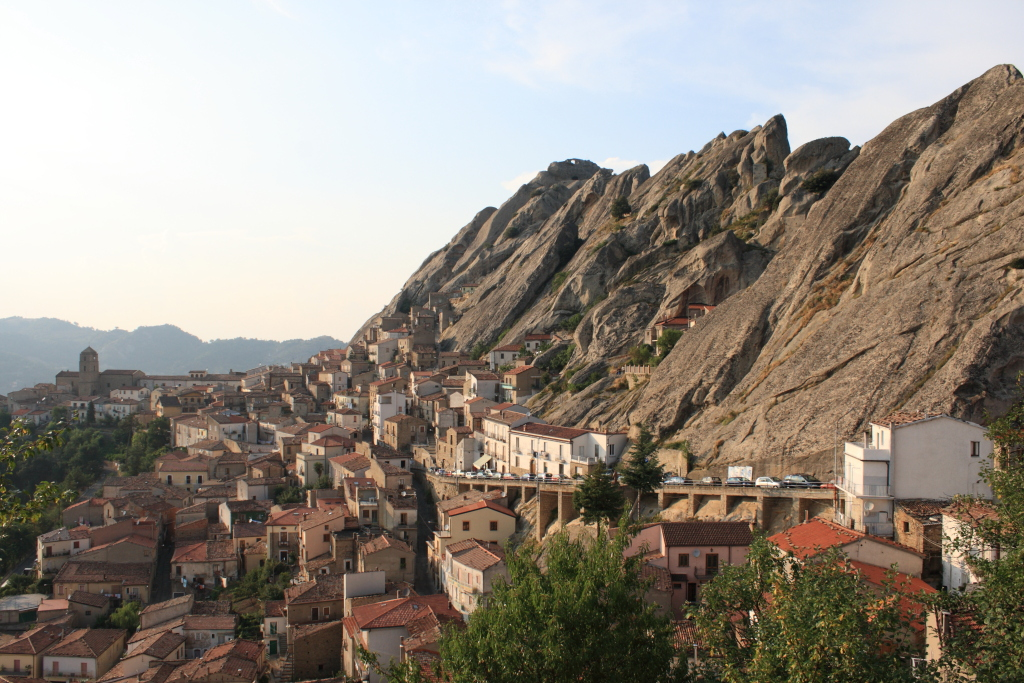
- View of Pietrapertosa

- Coat of arms

- Location within Italy Location within Basilicata
- Coordinates: 40°31′5.92″N 16°3′42.94″E
- Country: Italy
- Region: Basilicata
- Province: Potenza (PZ)

Government
  - Mayor: Antonio Pasquale Stasi

Area
  - Total: 67 km^{2} (26 sq mi)

Population (November 2014)
  - Total: 1,063
  - Density: 16/km^{2} (41/sq mi)
- Time zone: UTC+1 (CET)
  - Summer (DST): UTC+2 (CEST)
- Postal code: 85010
- Dialing code: 0971
- ISTAT code: 076061
- Website: Official website

Pietrapertosa is a town and comune in the province of Potenza, in the Southern Italian region of Basilicata. It is bounded by the comuni of Accettura, Albano di Lucania, Campomaggiore, Castelmezzano, Cirigliano, Corleto Perticara, Gorgoglione and Laurenzana. It is one of I borghi più belli d'Italia ("The most beautiful villages of Italy").

In 2019, CNN included Pietrapertosa among "20 of the most beautiful villages in Italy".

It was the lifelong home of Lucia Lauria Vigna, the oldest person in Italy for almost two and a half years.

Pietrapertosa is also home of one of the longest and highest zip lines in the world: Volo dell'Angelo (Angel Flight). This zip line goes mountain peak to mountain between the adjoining towns of Pietrapertosa and Castelmezzano.
