= 75011 =

75011 may refer to:

== Postal codes ==
- 11th arrondissement of Paris, France
- Accettura, Basilicate, Italy
- Carrollton, Texas, United States
- Šilalė, Tauragė, Lithuania

== Other ==
- 75011, a minor planet without naming citation

== See also ==
- For the year, see Timeline of the far future
