= Corleto =

Corleto may refer to:

== Localities ==
- Corleto Monforte, Italian municipality in the province of Salerno
- Corleto Perticara, Italian municipality in the province of Potenza

== People ==
- Ignacio Corleto, Argentine Rugby Union footballer
