= Pietro di Giampietro =

Italian painter (1709–1750)

Pietro di Giampietro (c. 1709 – c. 1750) was an Italian painter of the late Baroque period in the Basilicata region.

He was born in Brienza. His older brother, Leonardo, was also a painter. Pietro is known for his fresco decorations (1743–1744) at the church of San Francesco in San Martino d'Agri. The frescoes were probably inspired by painters from Naples. The frescoes depict saints and friars of the Franciscan Order, including James of the Marches, Saint Daniel, Francis of Assisi, Margaret of Cortona and Pope Gregory IX. Pietro also painted many of the frescoes at the church of San Donato in Ripacandida along with Nicola da Nova Siri.

His brother Leonardo painted a Deposition once found in the former convent dell'Annunziata in Brienza, as well as frescoes in the church of Santa Maria degli Angeli in that town. Pietro painted frescoes in the convent of dell'Annunziata (1740) in Brienza. Pietro also painted a Life of St Joseph and Christ (1750) for the chiesa di San Giuseppe in Brienza. In the parish church of Laurenzana, he painted a polyptych mural and decorated the ceiling with Evangelists and Doctors of the Church. In Cirigliano, in the Formica Chapel, he painted a Via Crucis. At another church in Laurenzana, there is a painting of the Our Lady of Sorrows which is attributed to di Giampietro or one of his students, based on its similarity to his painting of the Madonna del Carmine.
