= Garaguso =

Town and comune in Basilicata, Italy

- Comune
- Comune di Garaguso
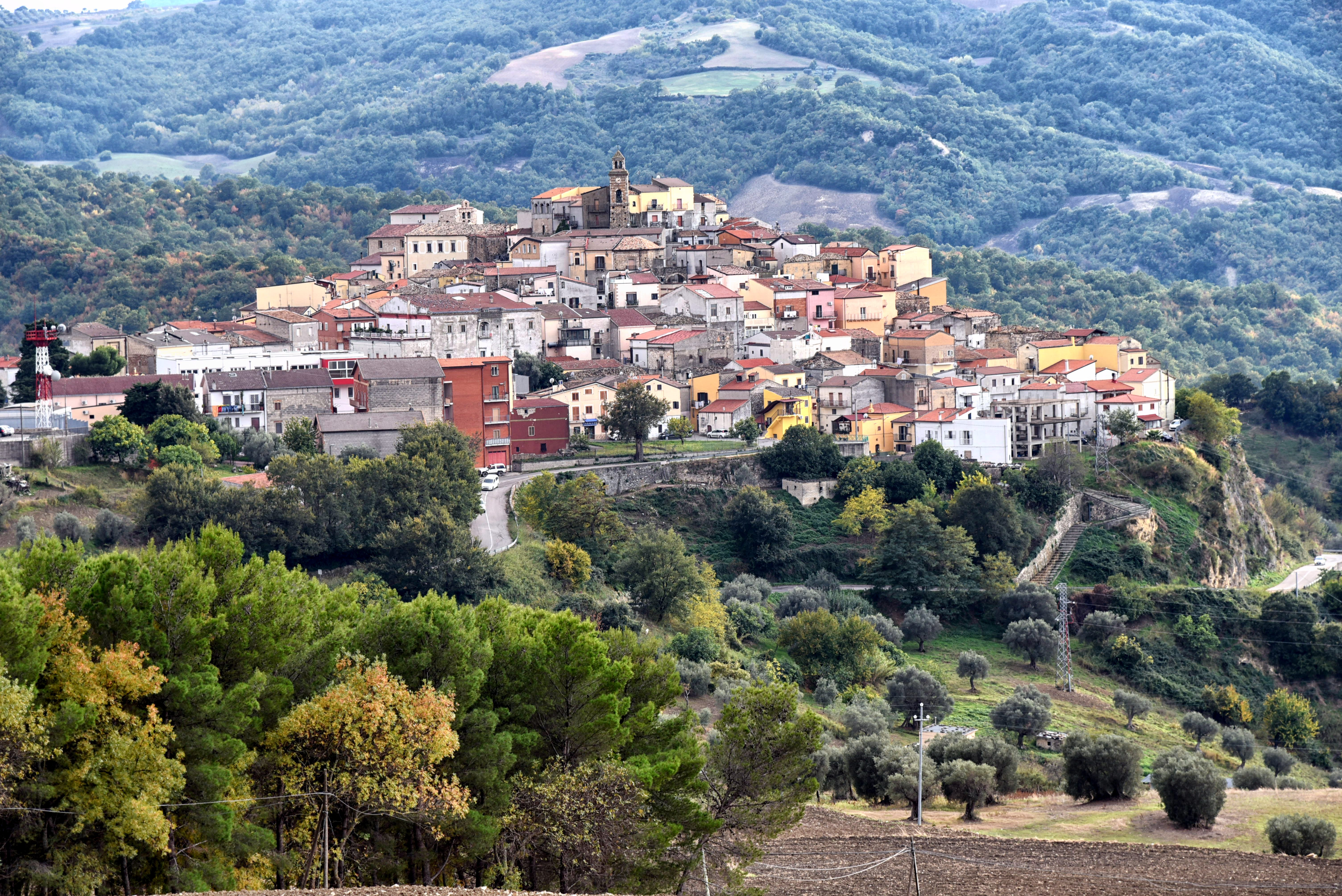
- View of Garaguso

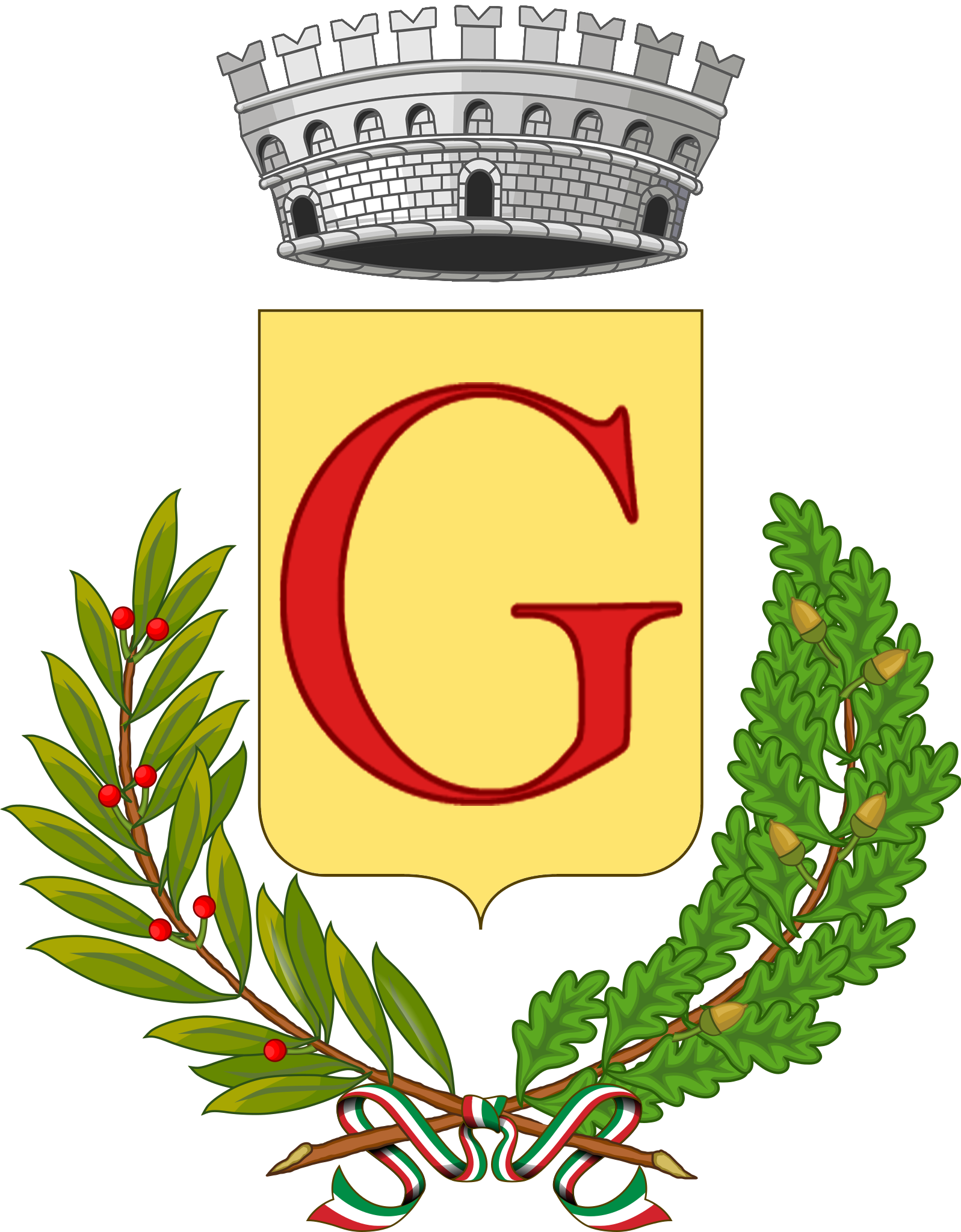
- Coat of arms

- Location of Garaguso in Italy Garaguso (Basilicata)
- Coordinates: 40°33′N 16°14′E
- Country: Italy
- Region: Basilicata
- Province: Matera (MT)
- Frazioni: Parata

Government
  - Mayor: Francesco Auletta

Area
  - Total: 38.62 km^{2} (14.91 sq mi)
- Elevation: 460 m (1,510 ft)

Population (2013)
  - Total: 1,108
  - Density: 28.69/km^{2} (74.31/sq mi)
- Demonym: Garagusani
- Time zone: UTC+1 (CET)
  - Summer (DST): UTC+2 (CEST)
- Postal code: 75010
- Dialing code: 0835
- ISTAT code: 077009
- Patron saint: Gaudentius of Rimini
- Saint day: 14 August
- Website: Official website

Garaguso is a town and comune in the province of Matera, in the Southern Italian region of Basilicata.

== Geography ==
Garaguso is an agricultural center in the upper valley of the Cavone River. The town is situated on a 460-metre (1,510 ft) hill and is bordered to the north by the town of Grassano, to the east by Salandra, to the south by San Mauro Forte, and west with Oliveto Lucano and Calciano.

== History ==
The results of archaeological investigations indicate that the area was inhabited since prehistoric times. The temple of Garaguso, Heroon is of note, revealing a strong Greek presence in the area.

In 1060, Garaguso was included in the jurisdiction of the Bishop of Tricarico. Important findings come from the territory are kept in the National Archaeological Museum of Basilicata, documenting an indigenous culture from the Iron Age to the fifth century BC. The museum contains marble dating from the first half of the fifth century BC: a model of the Heroon temple and a statue of a goddess sitting.

In the feudal period, Garaguso belonged to the Sanseverinos and in turn the Salandra family until 1813. The 1694 earthquake destroyed the original settlement further down the hill and was rebuilt by the Revettera di Salandra family in the XVIII century. A hunting lodge was built and is now called the Palace. The building is accessed by a path carved into the rock It has a central courtyard where there was also the family chapel that later enlarged to become the main church, dedicated to Saint Nicholas of Myra.

This parish church of Garguso dates to the eighteenth-century and has a clay sculpture of the fifteenth century depicting the Madonna della Puglia and a canvas painted in 1761 by Deodato da Tolve. In 1702, Cardinal Gaspare Carpegna donated a leg bone of Gaudentius of Rimini from Ostra to the parish priest, and in 1794, Fortunato Pinto, the bishop of Tricarico, donated an arm bone to the same parish. Gaudentius remains Garaguso's patron saint, though he is unusually celebrated on 14 August, rather than his death date on 14 October, so as not to interrupt the mid-October sowing season.
