= Maggio di Accettura =

Festival in Accettura, Italy

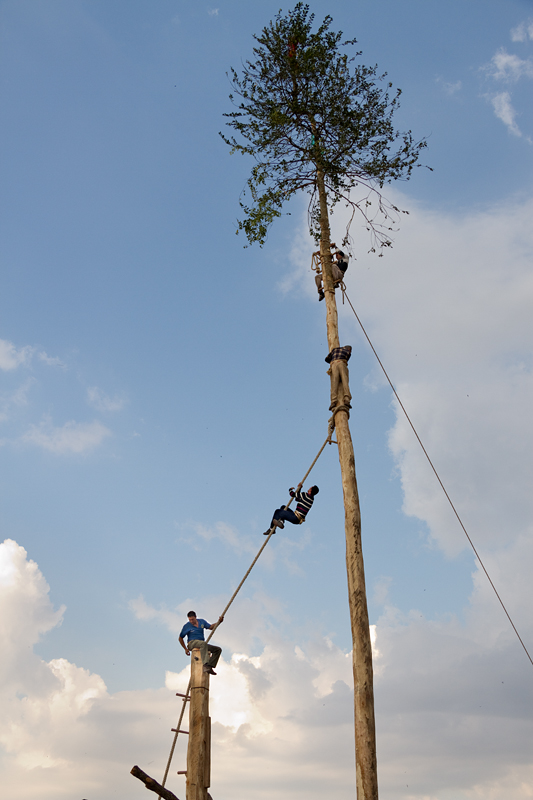
Raising the tree

Festival of St. Julian, also known under its Italian names Maggio di Accettura and Maggio di San Giuliano, or in short "Maggio", is an annual festival celebrated around Pentecost by the people of Accettura, a village in Basilicata, Italy.

The festival encompasses a ritual cycle marked by extensive preparations and various side events, such as processions featuring figures of the village's patron saint, St. Julian, as well as paintings of St. John and St. Paul. The festival reaches its peak with the raising of a large oak tree in the village square. This event garners widespread participation from the village populace and draws visitors from beyond its borders.

The festival, described as "one of the most important arboreal rites in Italy", combines agricultural pagan customs with Catholic elements, and may have Lombard origins.

== Terminology ==
The festival, occurring around Pentecost, is referred to as "Maggio", a term denoting "maypole", but also referring to the tree raised in the village. The Maggio is joined to a leafy holly known as the cima, top.

The term "marriage of trees", occasionally used to describe the union of the cima and the maggio, seems to originate from a primary school activity in 1961, and there is limited evidence of its association with the festival participants.

== Timeline ==
On Ascension Thursday, several oak trees, including the maggio and the posts for the winches, are cut down. These trees, sourced from the nearby Gallipoli Cognato Forest, are chosen under the supervision of forestry officials, loggers, and festival committee members.

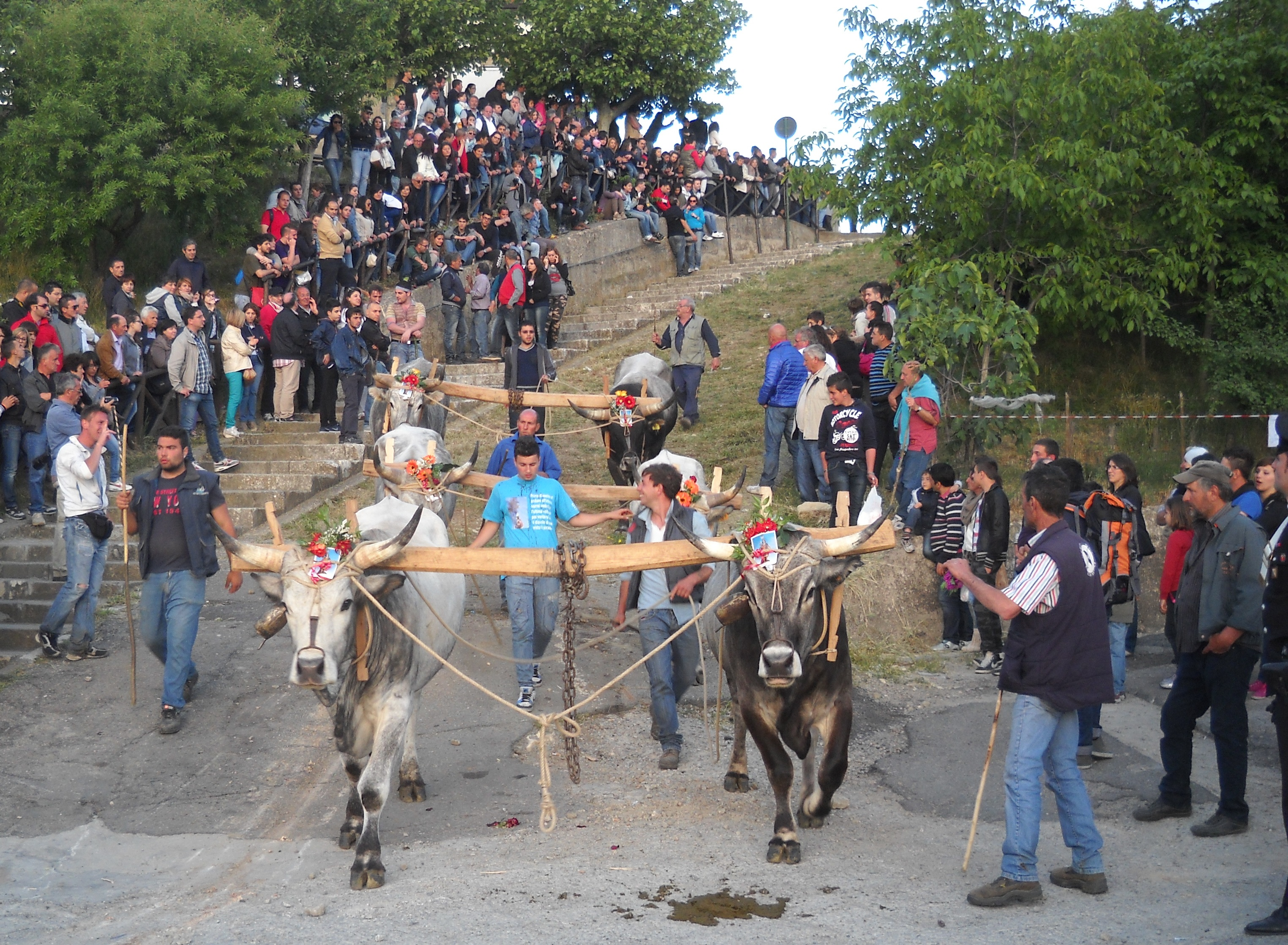
Maggio di Accettura, 2013

On Pentecost Saturday, the festival begins as oak trees, including the maggio itself and posts for the winches, are pulled by oxen toward the village.

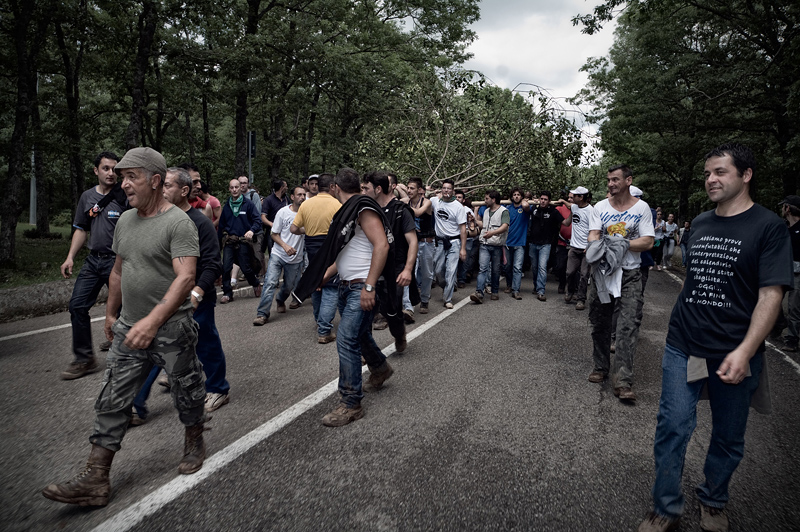
The cima transported to the village

The following day, Pentecost Sunday, a holly cima is felled in a forest at the opposite end of Accettura's territory, coinciding with a mass held by the parish priest for each group. The cima is transported to the village by young men who carry it on their shoulders for hours. As evening falls, the oak trees and the holly arrive in the village amid a festive atmosphere filled with food, wine, music, and singing.

Monday starts with a procession featuring the painting of St. John and St. Paul, while much of the day is devoted to preparing the square for the maggio's raising the next day. This task is no small feat, given the tree's weight, requiring the use of large winches. Monday evening sees a procession with a small statue of St. Julian.

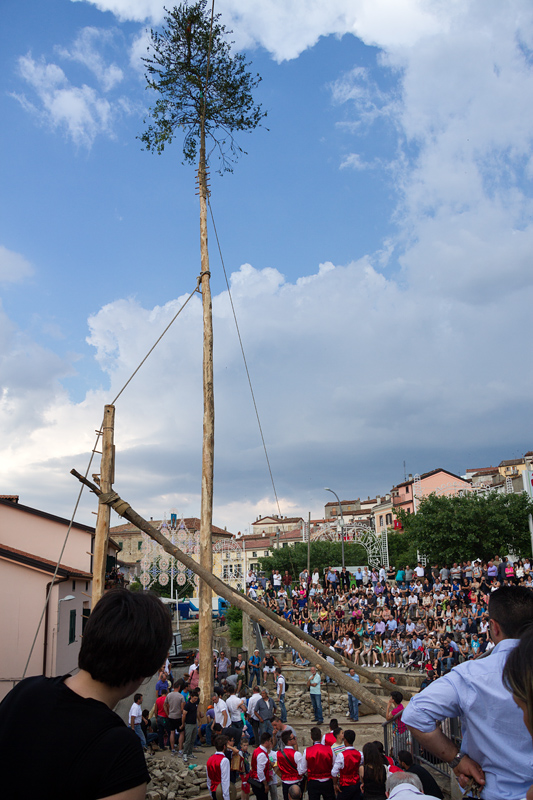
The joined cima and maggio are lifted into the air

This is followed by Tuesday morning, when the cima and the maggio are joined on the ground with the help of large wooden dowels. Metal tags, once bearing offerings like cheese, cured meat, and live animals, are attached to the branches. After a mass, a larger statue of St. Julian is paraded, halting in the main square where the maggio is raised, often exceeding 35 meters in height. Women participate by dancing while balancing votive candles on their heads, while in the evening, young men showcase acrobatic skills by climbing the tree. Previously, men would shoot at the tags with shotguns, adding to the festival's climax, which also features a concert and fireworks display.

The maggio remains in the square until Corpus Domini Sunday when it is publicly auctioned and dismantled, marking the conclusion of the festivities.

== Analysis ==
The festival is said to have pagan origins. Historical experts suggest that the earliest documented instance of the tradition can be traced back to the Lombards, a Germanic people that established themselves in the region during the 7th century.

During the late 18th century, the tradition underwent a transformation with the infusion of religious significance. This shift introduced the veneration of San Giuliano, the village's Catholic patron saint, whose statue is ceremonially paraded through the streets during the event.
