= Salandra =

- Comune
- Comune di Salandra
- Location within Italy Location within Basilicata
- Coordinates: 40°32′N 16°19′E
- Country: Italy
- Region: Basilicata
- Province: Matera (MT)

Government
  - Mayor: Gianfranco Tubito

Area
  - Total: 77.44 km^{2} (29.90 sq mi)
- Elevation: 598 m (1,962 ft)

Population (December 2008)
  - Total: 3,007
  - Density: 38.83/km^{2} (100.6/sq mi)
- Demonym: Salandresi
- Time zone: UTC+1 (CET)
  - Summer (DST): UTC+2 (CEST)
- Postal code: 75017
- Dialing code: 0835
- ISTAT code: 077024
- Patron saint: St. Roch
- Saint day: 16 August
- Website: Official website

Salandra (Lucano: Salândr; Greek: Salandhra) is a town and comune in the province of Matera, in the Southern Italian region of Basilicata.

== Geography ==
The town is located in northwestern Matera. Its downtown is centered on a hill (elev. 598 m) that dominates the valley of the river Salandrella, which is also the upper branch of the river Cavone. The slope facing the stream valley is covered in overhangs and distinctive clay gullies; the opposite slope, which faces the river Gruso, is covered in olive groves, orchards, and over 1000 hectares of oak woods.

To the north, Salandra borders the municipalities of Grottole (16 km away) and Grassano (25 km); to the east, it borders Ferrandina (18 km); to the southwest, San Mauro Forte (11 km); and to the west, Garaguso (13 km). The nearby hamlet of Montagnola contains Salandra's sports facilities, such as the multifunction building PalaSaponara and the municipal stadium.

== Etymology ==
There are two theories about the origin of the name Salandra. One hypothesis holds that it derives from the Ancient Greek thalassa andros ("men of the sea"), which would allude to colonists from Magna Graecia. The other suggests that the tortuous course of the Salandrella led people to identify it with the river god Achelous, who fought Hercules in the form of a coiled dragon; the Ancient Greek Acheloo andros, "men of Achelous," gradually became Achelandros and thence Salandra.

== History ==
The remains of an ancient village in Monte Sant'Angelo show that the area was inhabited by Oenotrians since at least the eighth century BC. The current city site dates back to the Norman era; Salandra is first officially mentioned in a 1060 papal bull. In 1119 Countess Emma of Sicily, wife of Count Rudolf of Montescaglioso and daughter of Roger I of Sicily, granted the fiefdom of Salandra to the Benedictine Abbey of St. Michael the Archangel in Montescaglioso. Later, in the Swabian League of Cities era, Salandra was owned by Baron Gilberto da Salandra, and in the Angevin era it passed to the Sangineto family. In 1381, the fief passed to the House of Sanseverino, counts of Tricarico. In 1485 Antonello Sanseverino, Prince of Salerno and head of the Conspiracy of the Barons, was deprived of all his fiefdoms by King Ferdinand I of Naples; the fief of Salandra was sold several times over in the following years. In 1544 Salandra was purchased by the Revertera family, who became dukes of Salandra in 1614 and remained its owners until 1805.

The Black Plague struck the town in 1656, after which the miracle-worker St. Roch was declared Salandra's patron saint. In 1799, the town participated actively in the Parthenopean Republican uprising. It was severely damaged by the 1857 Basilicata earthquake, which devastated the whole province.

In 1861, during the brigandage period, Salandra was attacked by brigands led by Carmine Crocco and José Borjes. The common people, who were hostile to their lords, let the brigands into the town despite the presence of the Sicilian national guard. Crocco attacked the town on 6 November 1861, when it was defended by the national guard, and wrote about the battle in his memoirs. Further details of the attack on the town are reported in Borjes' diary, where he attributes the successful conquest to his personal command.

=== Symbols ===
The municipal coat of arms has not yet been officially sanctioned. It consists of a blue background with two crossed sabers over three green peaks, the shield crowned in silver and subtended by oak and olive branches. The gonfalon is blue.

== Places of interest ==
Convento dei Padri Riformati / Convento di San Francesco: Currently the town hall, this convent began construction in 1573 at the behest of Francesco Revertera, lord of Salandra. Its construction was also funded by offerings from the general public. Initially dedicated to St. Anthony and then to St. Francis, the convent included a seminary, and served for a long time as the seat of the University of Theology. Father Serafino da Salandra was educated here; he later became governor of Basilicata and a poet.

Chiesa di Sant’Antonio (Church of St. Anthony): Annexed to the convent, this church is characterized by an elegant 18th-century portal decorated with Romanesque sculptures of two lions. It houses numerous works of art. These include a 1530 Polyptych of the Annunciation and a 1580 Polyptych of Antonio Stabile, both by Simone da Firenze, and a lunette depicting the Madonna and Child with Angels by Pier Antonio Ferro; a fine choral organ from 1570, one of the oldest functioning organs in Italy; a 17th-century altar; numerous paintings including Domenico Guarino's The Last Supper and numerous portraits; and statuary from the 16th and 17th centuries.

Chiesa Madre (Mother Church): Dedicated to the Holy Trinity, it was built in the 11th and 12th centuries, almost completely destroyed by the 1857 earthquake, and then rebuilt. It has a small bell tower with three bells.

Chiesa della Madonna del Monte (Church of the Madonna of the Mountain): This small church is located 7 km from town, on the road between the railway station and the Basentana highway. It stands on the site where legend has it that a shepherd, cutting down a tree, saw the image of the Madonna inside. The chapel was enlarged in the late 19th century, and the image of the Virgin Mary is kept in the altar niche. Her festival is celebrated here on the last Sunday in May.

Il Castello (the Castle): a 12th-century castle whose ruins mark the medieval center of town. The ruins include two visible arches and some remnant walls.

== Bibliography ==
- Raffaele Tosti (1982). Il mio paese: per una storia di Salandra. EDAD.
- Daniele Ragone (1983). Una perla della Basilicata - Salandra. Rome.
- Raffaele Miglionico (1990). Salandra dalla colonizzazione greca all'unità d'Italia.
- Raffaele Miglionico (2007). La Salandrella era un letto di ciottoli roventi. Rome: Il Filo.
