= Corleto Perticara =

- Comune
- Comune di Corleto Perticara
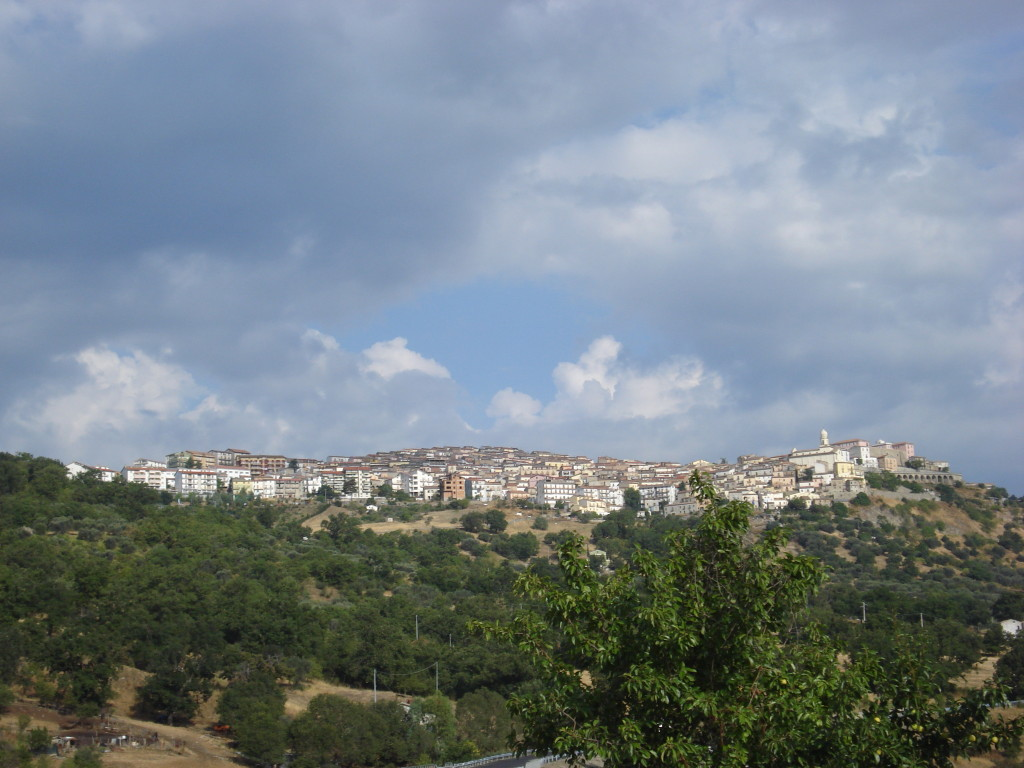
- View of Corleto Perticara

- Coat of arms

- Location of Corleto Perticara in Italy Corleto Perticara (Basilicata)
- Coordinates: 40°23′N 16°3′E
- Country: Italy
- Region: Basilicata
- Province: Potenza (PZ)

Government
  - Mayor: Mario Montano

Area
  - Total: 89.34 km^{2} (34.49 sq mi)
- Elevation: 749 m (2,457 ft)

Population (31 December 2021)
  - Total: 2,319
  - Density: 25.96/km^{2} (67.23/sq mi)
- Demonym: Corletani
- Time zone: UTC+1 (CET)
  - Summer (DST): UTC+2 (CEST)
- Postal code: 85012
- Dialing code: 0971
- ISTAT code: 076029
- Patron saint: St. Potitus Martyr
- Saint day: January 14
- Website: Official website

Corleto Perticara (Corletano: Curléte) is a town and comune in the province of Potenza, in the Southern Italian region of Basilicata. It is bounded by the comuni of Armento, Gorgoglione, Guardia Perticara, Laurenzana, Montemurro, Pietrapertosa, and Viggiano.

== Twin towns ==
- Poggibonsi, Italy

== Notable people ==
- Jack Bonadies, American football player
