= Giovanni Battista Bronzini =

Italian anthropologist and historian (1925–2002)

Giovanni Battista Bronzini (4 September 1925 in Matera – 17 March 2002 in Bari) was an Italian anthropologist and historian of Italian folk traditions.

He was a student at the University of Rome, where he learned from Paolo Toschi, a famous philologist and historian of folk traditions. He then became Professor Emeritus of Cultural Anthropology at the University of Bari and, from 1974, he became director of anthropological studies journal Lares, until his death in 2002.

A literary scholar, Bronzini explained magical and superstitious peasant culture of the 1930s and 1940s and the traditions of rural Italy. Through the works of writer Carlo Levi and poet Rocco Scotellaro, he studied and described the culture of his region and the surrounding area.

In 2012, the town of Accentura, in the Basilicata region, named the main square after him, in honor of his contributions and studies on the area and its traditions.

== Selected publications ==
- Tradizioni popolari in Lucania (Matera, Montemurro, 1953)
- Accettura: il contadino, l'albero, il santo (Galatina, Congedo, 1977)
- Mito e realtà della civiltà contadina lucana (Matera, Montemurro, 1977- Vincitore Premio “Basilicata”)
- Cultura popolare. Dialettica e contestualità (Bari, Dedalo, 1980), Cultura contadina e idea meridionalistica (Bari, Dedalo, 1982)
- Homo laborans. Cultura del territorio e musei demologici (Galatina, Congedo, 1985)
- I canti popolari di N. Tommaseo (Lecce, Milella, 1985)
- L'Universo contadino e l'immaginario poetico di Rocco Scotellaro (Bari, Dedalo, 1987)
- Intellettuali e poesia popolare nella Sicilia dell'Ottocento (Palermo, Sellerio, 1991)
- La letteratura popolare italiana dell'Otto-Novecento: profilo storico-geografico (Novara – Firenze, De Agostini – Le Monnier, 1994)
- Storia del culto della Madonna dell'Arco attraverso le fonti scritte e figurative dei secoli XVII-XVIII (Firenze, Olschki, 1998)
