= Oliveto Lucano =

- Comune
- Comune di Oliveto Lucano
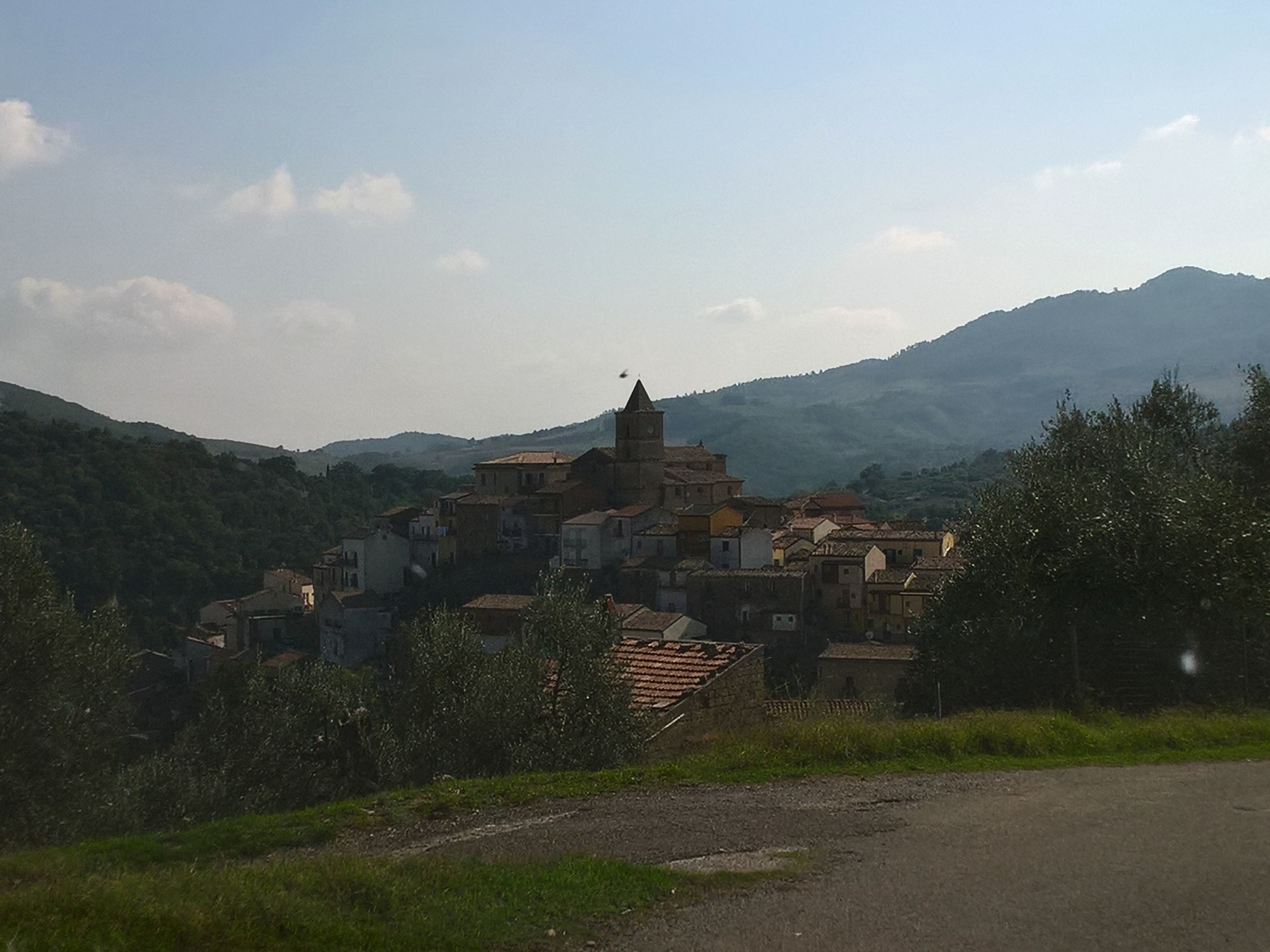
- View of Oliveto Lucano

- Coat of arms

- Location of Oliveto Lucano in Italy Oliveto Lucano (Basilicata)
- Coordinates: 40°32′N 16°11′E
- Country: Italy
- Region: Basilicata
- Province: Matera (MT)
- Frazioni: Accettura, Calciano, Garaguso, San Mauro Forte

Government
  - Mayor: Nicola Terranova

Area
  - Total: 31.19 km^{2} (12.04 sq mi)
- Elevation: 546 m (1,791 ft)

Population (December 2008)
  - Total: 530
  - Density: 17/km^{2} (44/sq mi)
- Demonym: Olivetesi
- Time zone: UTC+1 (CET)
  - Summer (DST): UTC+2 (CEST)
- Postal code: 75010
- Dialing code: 0835
- ISTAT code: 077019
- Patron saint: St. Cyprian
- Saint day: 12 August
- Website: Official website

Oliveto Lucano is a town and comune in the province of Matera, in the Southern Italian region of Basilicata. Its mayor is Nicola Terranova. This town is most known for the "Maggio Festival", which is dedicated to St. Cyprian and takes place on 10, 11 and 12 August.
