= Rotondella =

- Comune
- Comune di Rotondella
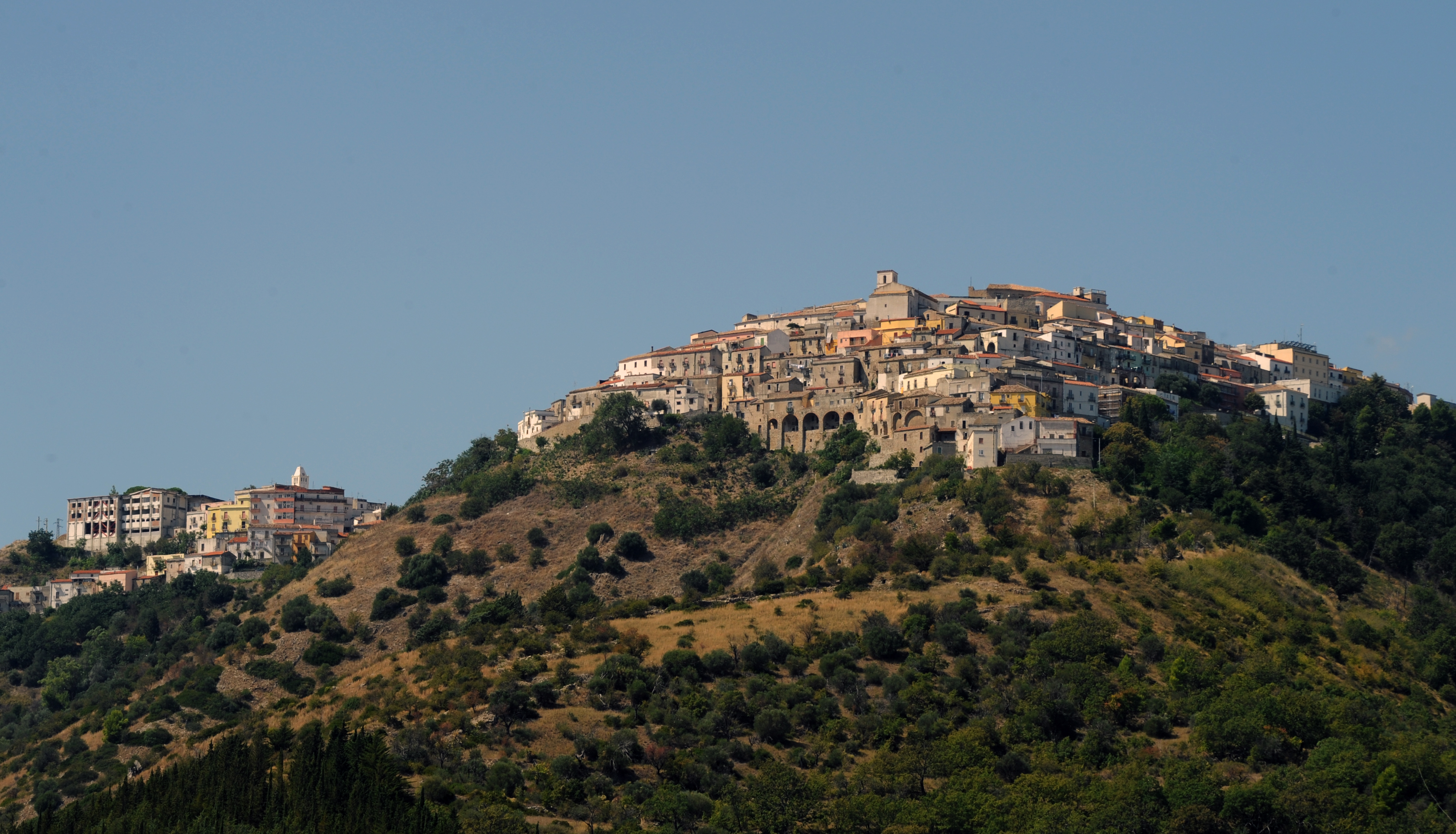
- View of Rotondella

- Coat of arms

- Location within Italy Location within Basilicata
- Coordinates: 40°10′N 16°31′E
- Country: Italy
- Region: Basilicata
- Province: Matera (MT)
- Frazioni: Mortella, Rotondella Due, Trisaia

Government
  - Mayor: Gianluca Palazzo

Area
  - Total: 76.72 km^{2} (29.62 sq mi)
- Highest elevation: 576 m (1,890 ft)
- Lowest elevation: 0 m (0 ft)

Population (May 31, 2025)
  - Total: 2,335
  - Density: 30.44/km^{2} (78.83/sq mi)
- Demonym(s): Rotondellesi (Italian), Rutunnare (vernacular)
- Time zone: UTC+1 (CET)
  - Summer (DST): UTC+2 (CEST)
- Postal code: 75026
- Dialing code: 0835
- ISTAT code: 077023
- Patron saint: Anthony of Padua
- Saint day: 13 June
- Website: Official website

Rotondella (Neapolitan language: 'a Retunne) is a town and comune in the province of Matera, in the Southern Italian region of Basilicata.

== Language ==
The local vernacular lies on the eastern tip of the Lausberg area, and as such it is an archaizing dialect of the Neapolitan language. It features a notable amount of inherited Ancient and Byzantine Greek words, like surigghia, "lizard", from *sauricola, a late diminutive of σαύρα (saúra); ghattuvigghia "bat", from a similarly-formed diminutive of νυκτερίς (nukterís), also influenced by ghatt "cat"; or zilona, "turtle", from χελώνη (chelóna), all with the same meaning.

== Cuisine ==
- U pastizz rutunnar: Prodotti agroalimentari tradizionali (protected traditional food), half moon-shaped pie filled with mincemeat.
- Frizzule c'a muddiche: pasta kneaded on a knitting needle (called frizzulo in the local vernacular) and served with meat sauce and fried, paprika-flavoured breadcrumbs.
- Sospiri di Rotondella: a local twist on an all-Southern glazed sponge cake with cream filling. Also produced in Pisticci, with a slightly different recipe (the Rotondellese one is kept secret by the local pastry chef).

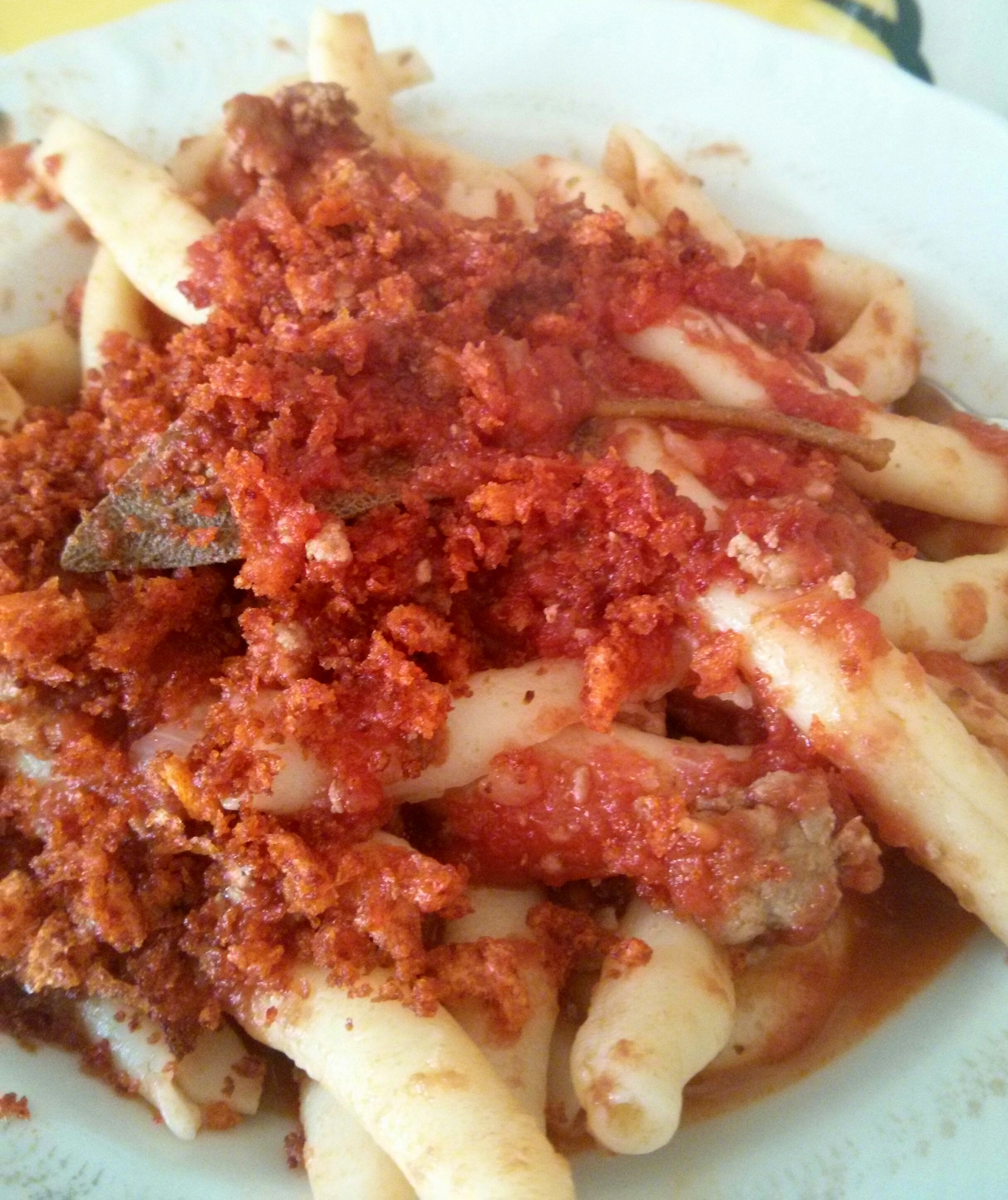
Frizzule c'a muddiche

== Twin towns ==
- Casalfiumanese, Italy
