= Nova Siri =

- Comune
- Comune di Nova Siri
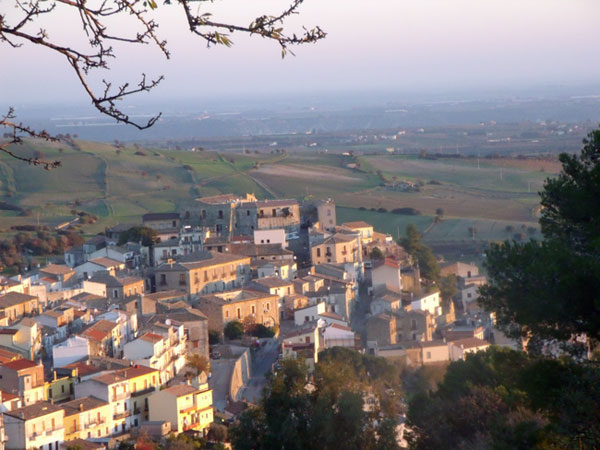
- View of Nova Siri

- Coat of arms

- Location within Italy Location within Basilicata
- Coordinates: 40°9′N 16°32′E
- Country: Italy
- Region: Basilicata
- Province: Matera (MT)
- Frazioni: San Basile, San Megale, Sant'Alessio, Cerrolongo, Piana delle vigne, Foresta

Government
  - Mayor: Antonio Mele (municipal list)

Area
  - Total: 52 km^{2} (20 sq mi)
- Elevation: 355 m (1,165 ft)

Population (December 2008)
  - Total: 6,698
  - Density: 130/km^{2} (330/sq mi)
- Demonym: Novasiresi
- Time zone: UTC+1 (CET)
  - Summer (DST): UTC+2 (CEST)
- Postal code: 75020
- Dialing code: 0835
- ISTAT code: 077018
- Patron saint: Saint Joseph in Nova Siri paese and St. Anthony of Padua in Nova Siri Scalo
- Saint day: 19 March (and 13 June no festival)
- Website: Official website

Nova Siri is a town and comune in the province of Matera, in the Southern Italian region of Basilicata. Nova Siri is close to the site of the ancient Ionian colony of Siris. Nova Siri is formed by two small towns: the old, historic Nova Siri Centre ('paese') and the coastal town developed from the 1970s - Nova Siri Station ('Scalo'). The centre is sited on a hill at 350 metres (1,150 ft) above sea level about 9 km (6 mi) from the sea.

The main church and the castle are of medieval origin. The Monte Pollino National Park is located nearby.

Nova Siri is a popular holiday and tourist destination, thanks to its sandy coast characterized by coastal dunes. Nova Siri is reached via the SS 106 National road and by train.

The population is around 6,800, with the majority being in the newer, seaside town of Nova Siri Scalo.

== History ==
The history of Nova Siri starts during the Byzantine rule of southern Italy, when it was used as a military fortress. The old name “Bollita” comes from porcini mushrooms and the current name was replaced on the council’s request to recall its origins as a Greek territory.

It remained almost deserted after World War I and few people were able to deal with the agricultural work required in the fields.

Nova Siri experienced a demographics growth in the 1970s. Some scenes from the movies Basilicata Coast to Coast by Rocco Papelo and Three Brothers by Francesco Rosi were filmed there.

== Economy ==
Economic resources include summer tourism, agriculture - especially soft fruit, wine production and local cuisine.

== Festivals ==
Events in the town include the Sagra d’ricchitell and the Notte dei briganti ("Night of the Bandits"). The latter is a historical reenactment that consists of a performance of scenes from the war between bandits and peasants and scenes from the daily life of the late 19th century.
