= Julian of Sora =

Saint (died c. 160)

Saint Julian of Sora

Martyr
- Born: Dalmatia
- Died: c. 160; Sora, Lazio, Italy
- Venerated in: Roman Catholic Church, Orthodox Church
- Canonized: Pre-congregation
- Feast: 27 January (Roman Catholic), 11 August (Orthodox)

Saint Julian of Sora was a martyr of Sora, Lazio, Italy. A Dalmatian by birth, he was tortured and subsequently beheaded by Roman soldiers in Sora on his way to Campania during the reign of Emperor Antoninus Pius. He is commemorated by the Roman Catholic Church on 27 January and by the Eastern Orthodox Church on 28 July (Old Style) or on 11 August (New Style). His feast day is 27 January.
