= San Giorgio Lucano =

- Comune
- Comune di San Giorgio Lucano
- Location within Italy Location within Basilicata
- Coordinates: 40°7′N 16°23′E
- Country: Italy
- Region: Basilicata
- Province: Matera (MT)
- Frazioni: Cersosimo (PZ), Nocara (CS), Noepoli (PZ), Oriolo (CS), Senise (PZ), Valsinni

Government
  - Mayor: Gennaro Labollita

Area
  - Total: 38 km^{2} (15 sq mi)
- Elevation: 416 m (1,365 ft)

Population (30 September 2012)
  - Total: 1,279
  - Density: 34/km^{2} (87/sq mi)
- Demonym: Sangiorgesi
- Time zone: UTC+1 (CET)
  - Summer (DST): UTC+2 (CEST)
- Postal code: 75027
- Dialing code: 0835
- ISTAT code: 077025
- Patron saint: St. Roch
- Saint day: 16 August
- Website: Official website

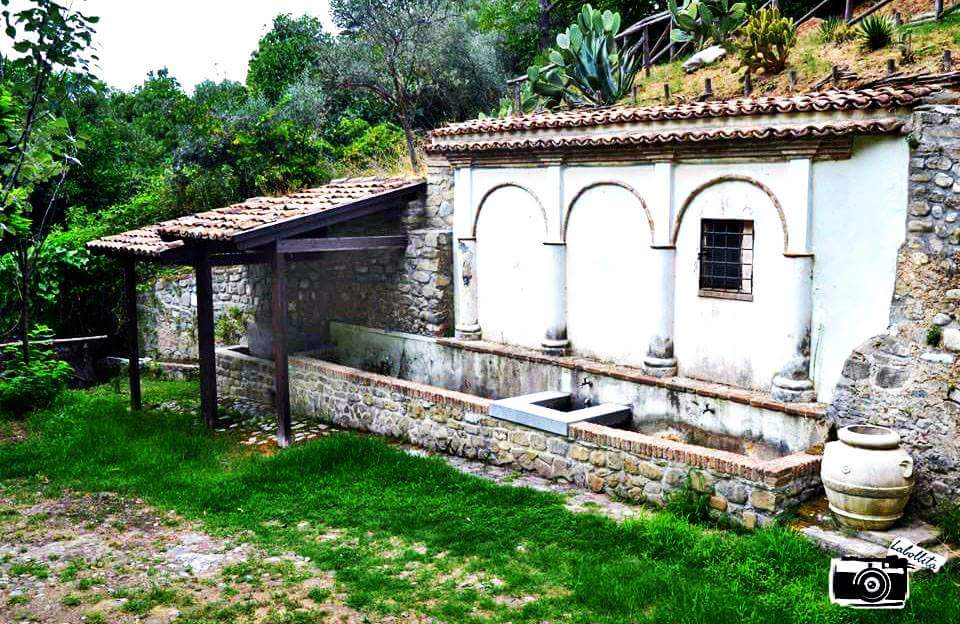
Fontana Vecchia - San Giorgio Lucano

San Giorgio Lucano is a town and comune in the province of Matera, in the Southern Italian region of Basilicata.
