= Miglionico =

- Comune
- Comune di Miglionico
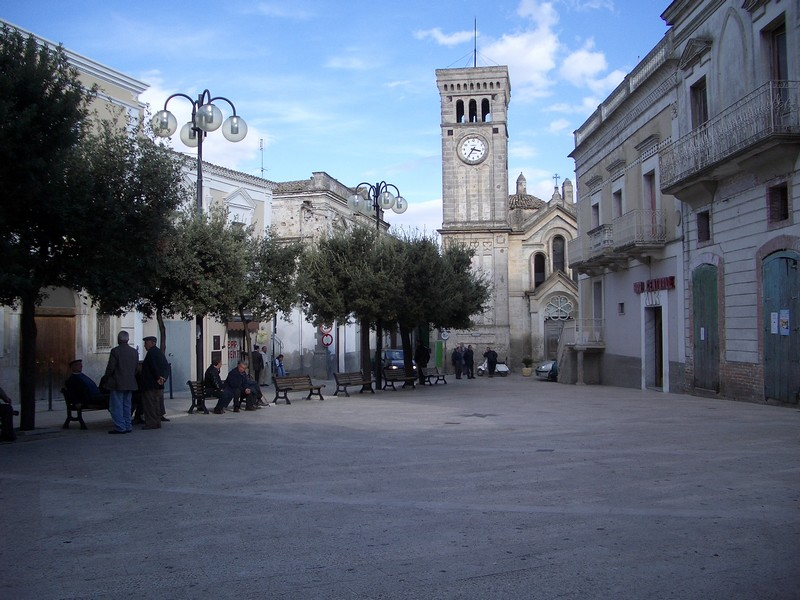
- View of Miglionico

- Location within Italy Location within Basilicata
- Coordinates: 40°34′N 16°30′E
- Country: Italy
- Region: Basilicata
- Province: Matera (MT)

Government
  - Mayor: Francesco Comanda

Area
  - Total: 88.84 km^{2} (34.30 sq mi)
- Elevation: 465 m (1,526 ft)

Population (2018-01-01)
  - Total: 2,461
  - Density: 27.70/km^{2} (71.75/sq mi)
- Demonym: Miglionichesi
- Time zone: UTC+1 (CET)
  - Summer (DST): UTC+2 (CEST)
- Postal code: 75010
- Dialing code: 0835
- ISTAT code: 077015
- Patron saint: St. Peter
- Saint day: June 29
- Website: Official website

Miglionico (Lucano: Megghiuòneche) is a town and comune in the province of Matera, in Basilicata, southern Italy. It is one of I Borghi più belli d'Italia ("The most beautiful villages of Italy").

== Main sights ==
- The massive Castello del Malconsiglio ("Castle of the Bad Council"), built in the 8th-9th century and enlarged in 1110 and in the 15th century.
- The Basilica of Santa Maria Maggiore.

== History ==
Despite the legend assigning its foundation to the famous Greek wrestler Milo of Croton (whence the name), Miglionico was most likely founded by the Oenotrians, a local Italic tribe. After the Greek colonization, it was held by the Lucani, followed by the Samnites until 458 BC, when it was conquered by the Romans.

In the Middle Ages the story of Miglionico was strongly connected to that of its large castle, which was held by the Hauteville Normans and then by the Sanseverino. After the latter where slaughtered by order of Frederick II (1245), Miglionico was assigned to his son Manfred. After the latter's fall, however, the Sanseverino were re-instated, holding the town until the abolition of feudalism.
