= Stigliano =

- Comune
- Comune di Stigliano
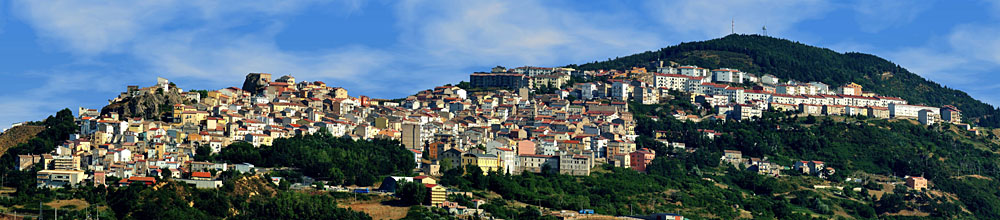

- Coat of arms

- Location within Italy Location within Basilicata
- Coordinates: 40°24′N 16°14′E
- Country: Italy
- Region: Basilicata
- Province: Matera (MT)
- Frazioni: Calvera, Caputo, Carpinello, Gannano, Santo Spirito, Serra di Croce

Government
  - Mayor: Francesco Micucci

Area
  - Total: 211.15 km^{2} (81.53 sq mi)
- Elevation: 909 m (2,982 ft)

Population (March 2008)
  - Total: 5,037
  - Density: 23.86/km^{2} (61.78/sq mi)
- Demonym: Stiglianesi
- Time zone: UTC+1 (CET)
  - Summer (DST): UTC+2 (CEST)
- Postal code: 75018
- Dialing code: 0835
- ISTAT code: 077027
- Patron saint: St. Anthony of Padua
- Saint day: 13 June
- Website: Official website

Stigliano (Lucano: Stëgghiànë, Latin: Stilianum) is a town and comune in the province of Matera, in the Basilicata region of southern Italy.

The name is likely of Byzantine origin, stemming from "Stylianos", a Greek name with a Latin ending.

== History ==
The town was founded by the Lucani, and later was conquered by the Greek colony of Metaponto. During the classical imperial era of the Roman Empire, the town was owned by the Hostilii family. After the Western Roman Empire fall, it fell under the Lombards. It was part of the medieval Principality of Salerno. In 1070, it was given to the bishops of Tricarico.

In 1274 King Charles I of Anjou gave it as a fief to Giacomo di Bosciniano. The powerful Neapolitan family of the Carafa acquired it in 1289. In 1556 the whole fief passed under the Spanish Dukes the Medina, who made it the capital of the Basilicata province. In 1806, after the abolition of feudalism, Stigliano went under the direct administration of the Kingdom of Naples and later the Kingdom of the Two Sicilies and, in 1861, became part of the newly unified Kingdom of Italy.

During the Fascist era, dissidents were often sent to internal exile to Stigliano.

== Main sights ==
- Convent of St. Anthony. It has a 17th-century Baroque façade with a large bell tower with an Arabic-style dome. The interior is home to 17th-century paintings and of a precious wooden crucifix.
- Mother Church, dedicated to Santa Maria Assunta. It has numerous works of art, including a 16th-century polyptych attributed to Simone da Firenze, with a statue of the Madonna with paintings of Saints, Angels and Father God. The structure has a notable wooden vault with cupolas in the two aisles. Also, peculiar are the 19th century carved wooden choir, the frescoed crypt and a statue of the Vergine Assunta donated to the church in 1522.
- The castle and remains of the walls.

== Twin towns ==
- Gigean, France
- Cardano al Campo, Italy

== Sources ==
- Pennetti, Giuseppe (1899). Stigliano: nuove notizie storiche ed archeologiche con documenti inediti. Naples: M. D'Auria.
