= Province of Matera =

Province of Italy

Coordinates: 40°40′N 16°36′E

Province of Matera Provincia di Matera (Italian) Provìngë dë Matàërë (Materano)
- Province
- Flag Coat of arms

- Location of the province of Matera in Italy
- Country: Italy
- Region: Basilicata
- Capital(s): Matera
- Municipalities: 31

Government
  - President: Francesco Mancini

Area
  - Total: 3,478.89 km^{2} (1,343.21 sq mi)

Population (2026)
  - Total: 187,754
  - Density: 53.9695/km^{2} (139.780/sq mi)

GDP
  - Total: €3.417 billion (2015)
  - Per capita: €17,004 (2015)
- Time zone: UTC+1 (CET)
  - Summer (DST): UTC+2 (CEST)
- Postal code: 75100
- Telephone prefix: 0835
- Vehicle registration: MT
- ISTAT code: 077

The province of Matera (Italian: provincia di Matera; Materano: provìngë dë Matàërë) is a province in the region of Basilicata in southern Italy. Its capital is the city of Matera. It has a population of 187,754 in an area of 3,447 square kilometres (1,331 mi^{2}) across its 31 municipalities. It is bordered by the province of Potenza in the west and south, the region of Calabria also to the south, the region of Apulia to the east and north, and by the Ionian Sea to the southeast.

The province is known for its history of cave dwellings known as sassi.

== History ==
The history of settlement in the region dates back to the Palaeolithic Period and the first instance of organised settlement was in 251 BCE, when Roman Republic consul Lucius Caecilius Metellus founded the town as Matera. Matera was sacked multiple times; initially by the Franks, then by Roman Emperor Louis II of Italy, and then by invading Muslims during the 10th century. Following this, the town was owned by the Capetian House of Anjou and the Crown of Aragon and was sold multiple times to successive wealthy families.

Giovanni Carlo Tramontano, Count of Matera was briefly leader of the city but was despised by the residents, who saw him as tyrannical and rebelled against him, murdering Tramontano on 29 December 1514. The city Matera was announced to be the capital of ancient district Lucania (Basilicata) in 1663; this status was removed from the city in 1806 and 1860. Under the Fascist rule of Italy, the title of Matera serving as the capital of Basilicata was restored in 1927.

== Municipalities ==
The province has 31 municipalities:

- Accettura
- Aliano
- Bernalda
- Calciano
- Cirigliano
- Colobraro
- Craco
- Ferrandina
- Garaguso
- Gorgoglione
- Grassano
- Grottole
- Irsina
- Matera
- Miglionico
- Montalbano Jonico
- Montescaglioso
- Nova Siri
- Oliveto Lucano
- Pisticci
- Policoro
- Pomarico
- Rotondella
- Salandra
- San Giorgio Lucano
- San Mauro Forte
- Scanzano Jonico
- Stigliano
- Tricarico
- Tursi
- Valsinni

== Demographics ==
As of 2026, the population is 187,754, of which 49.7% are male, and 50.3% are female. Minors make up 13.9% of the population, and seniors make up 25.9%.

Historical population

Year	Pop.	±%
1861	113,726	—
1871	116,344	+2.3%
1881	127,992	+10.0%
1901	129,578	+1.2%
1911	130,052	+0.4%
1921	130,637	+0.4%
1931	140,040	+7.2%
1936	149,312	+6.6%

Year	Pop.	±%
1951	182,398	+22.2%
1961	200,131	+9.7%
1971	194,629	−2.7%
1981	203,570	+4.6%
1991	208,985	+2.7%
2001	204,239	−2.3%
2011	200,101	−2.0%
2021	191,552	−4.3%

Source: ISTAT

=== Immigration ===
As of 2025, immigrants make up 8.5% of the total population. The 5 largest foreign countries of birth are Romania, Albania, Germany, Morocco, and Bangladesh.
