= Campomaggiore =

- Comune
- Comune di Campomaggiore
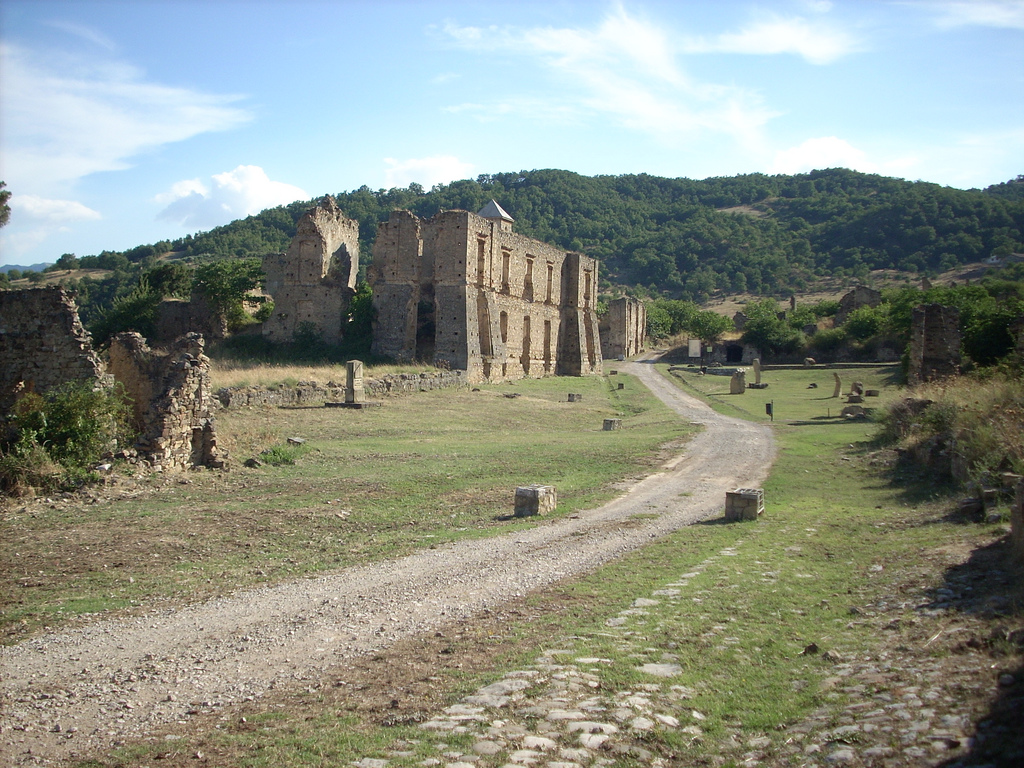
- View of Campomaggiore

- Coat of arms

- Location of Campomaggiore in Italy Campomaggiore (Basilicata)
- Coordinates: 40°34′N 16°4′E
- Country: Italy
- Region: Basilicata
- Province: Potenza (PZ)

Government
  - Mayor: Nicola Blasi

Area
  - Total: 12.48 km^{2} (4.82 sq mi)
- Elevation: 795 m (2,608 ft)

Population (30 April 2017)
  - Total: 794
  - Density: 63.6/km^{2} (165/sq mi)
- Demonym: Campomaggioresi
- Time zone: UTC+1 (CET)
  - Summer (DST): UTC+2 (CEST)
- Postal code: 85010
- Dialing code: 0971
- ISTAT code: 076017
- Patron saint: Holy Virgil of the Carmel Mountain
- Saint day: 16 July
- Website: Official website

Campomaggiore is a town and comune in the province of Potenza, Basilicata, southern Italy. It includes a modern settlement which has replaced the original town Campomaggiore Vecchio, destroyed by an avalanche in 1885 and now a ghost town.

== Twin towns ==
- Cesano Maderno, Italy
