= San Mauro Forte =

- Comune
- Comune di San Mauro Forte
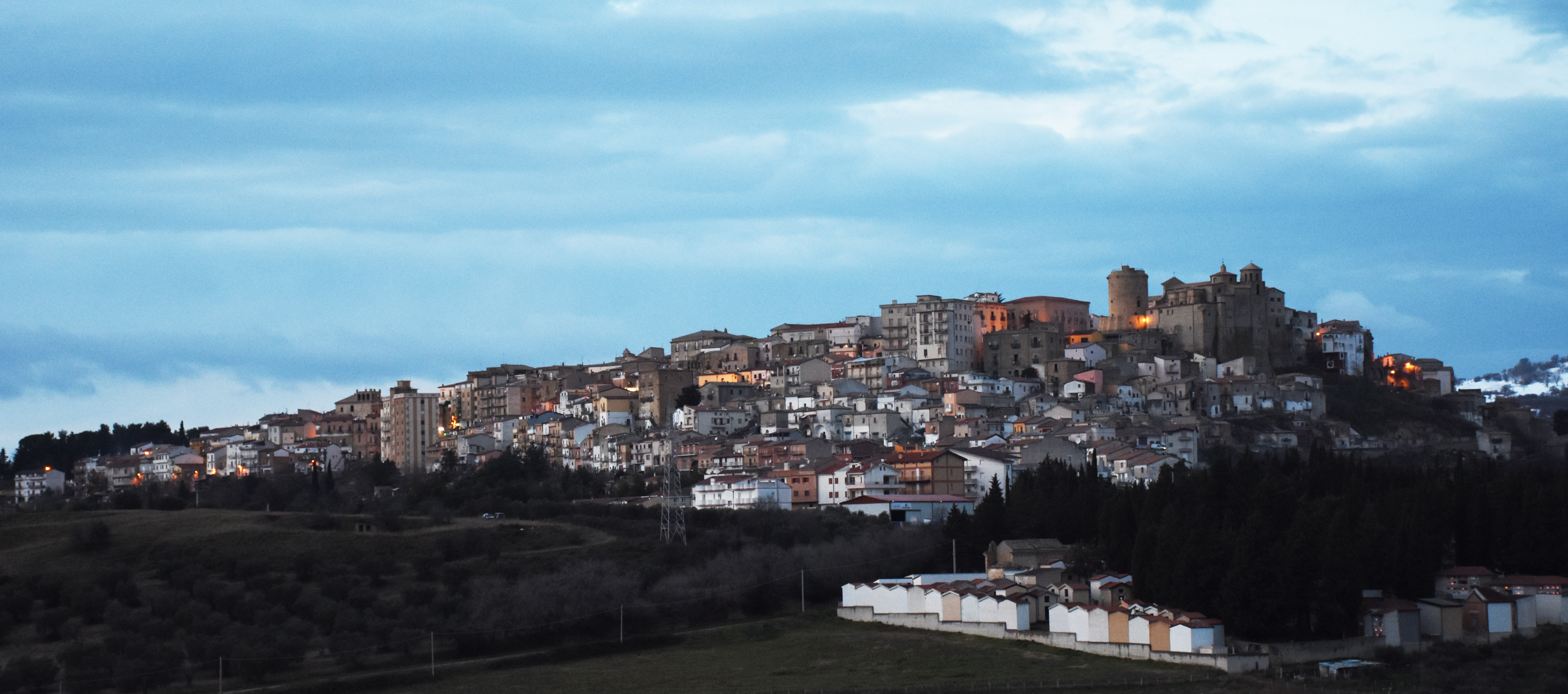
- View of San Mauro Forte

- Coat of arms

- Location within Italy Location within Basilicata
- Coordinates: 40°29′N 16°15′E
- Country: Italy
- Region: Basilicata
- Province: Matera (MT)

Government
  - Mayor: Nicola Savino

Area
  - Total: 86.89 km^{2} (33.55 sq mi)
- Elevation: 540 m (1,770 ft)

Population (December 2008)
  - Total: 1,803
  - Density: 20.75/km^{2} (53.74/sq mi)
- Demonym: Sanmauresi
- Time zone: UTC+1 (CET)
  - Summer (DST): UTC+2 (CEST)
- Postal code: 75010
- Dialing code: 0835
- ISTAT code: 077026
- Patron saint: San Mauro abate
- Saint day: 15 January
- Website: Official website

San Mauro Forte is a town and comune in the province of Matera, in the Southern Italian region of Basilicata.

== History ==
The area was established in the sixth century.

It was probably part of Magna Graecia.

== Geography ==
The town is on a hill, 540 metres (1,770 ft) above sea level, in the west central part of the province. To the north are the communes of Salandra (14 km/9 miles), Oliveto Lucano (15 km/9 miles) and Garaguso (17 km/11 miles). To the east is Ferrandina (31 km/20 miles) with Craco (25 km/15 miles) and Stigliano (31 km/20 miles) to the south. Accettura is (14 km/9 miles) to the south. The provincial capital, Matera, is 70 km/44 miles away, while the administrative capital of the adjacent province, Potenza, is 66 km/41 miles away.

San Mauro Forte is included in the administrative grouping of Upland Communes of the Matera Hills.

== Main sights ==
- Torre Normanna, "Norman Tower"
- The sixteenth-century Church of Santa Maria Assunta, in which are preserved valuable paintings from the eighteenth century;
- The Church of the Annunciation, built in the sixteenth century by Franciscan monks, with an adjoining convent;
- The Church of St. Mary of the Angels (also known as Chapel of the Rosary or Saint Lucia), of ancient origins;
- The eighteenth-century Church of St. Vincent, with a majolica tiled floor and an eighteenth-century organ;
- The noble palaces, such as Palazzo Arciaerie (today seat of the Town Hall) and Palazzo Lauria, famous for its Baroque-style portal.

== Religious festivals ==
- The Feast of Saint Maurus, 15 January
- Campanacci, the "Festival of the Cowbell", 16 January
- St Anthony the Abbot, 17 January
- The Feast of Saint Roch, 3 September

== Gallery ==
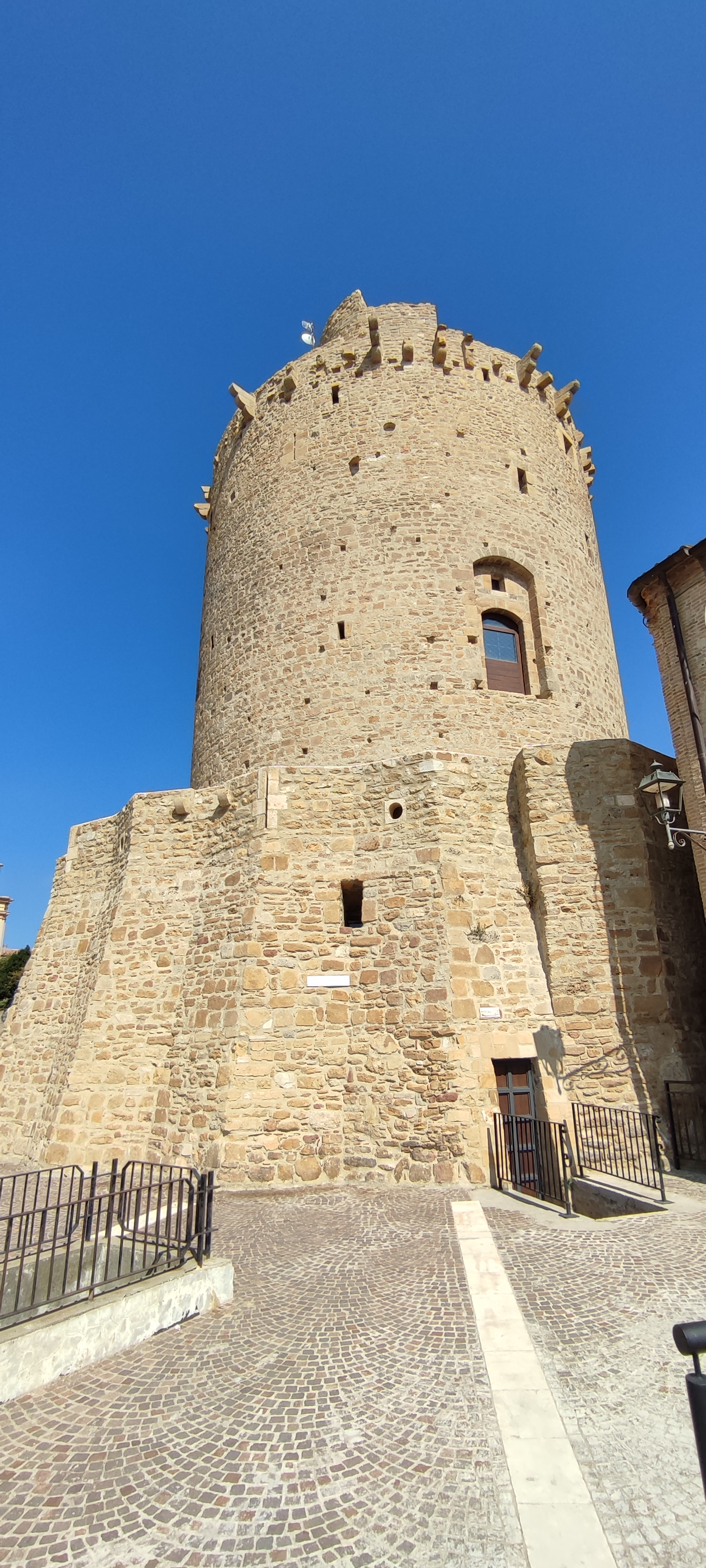
Torre Normanna "Norman Tower"

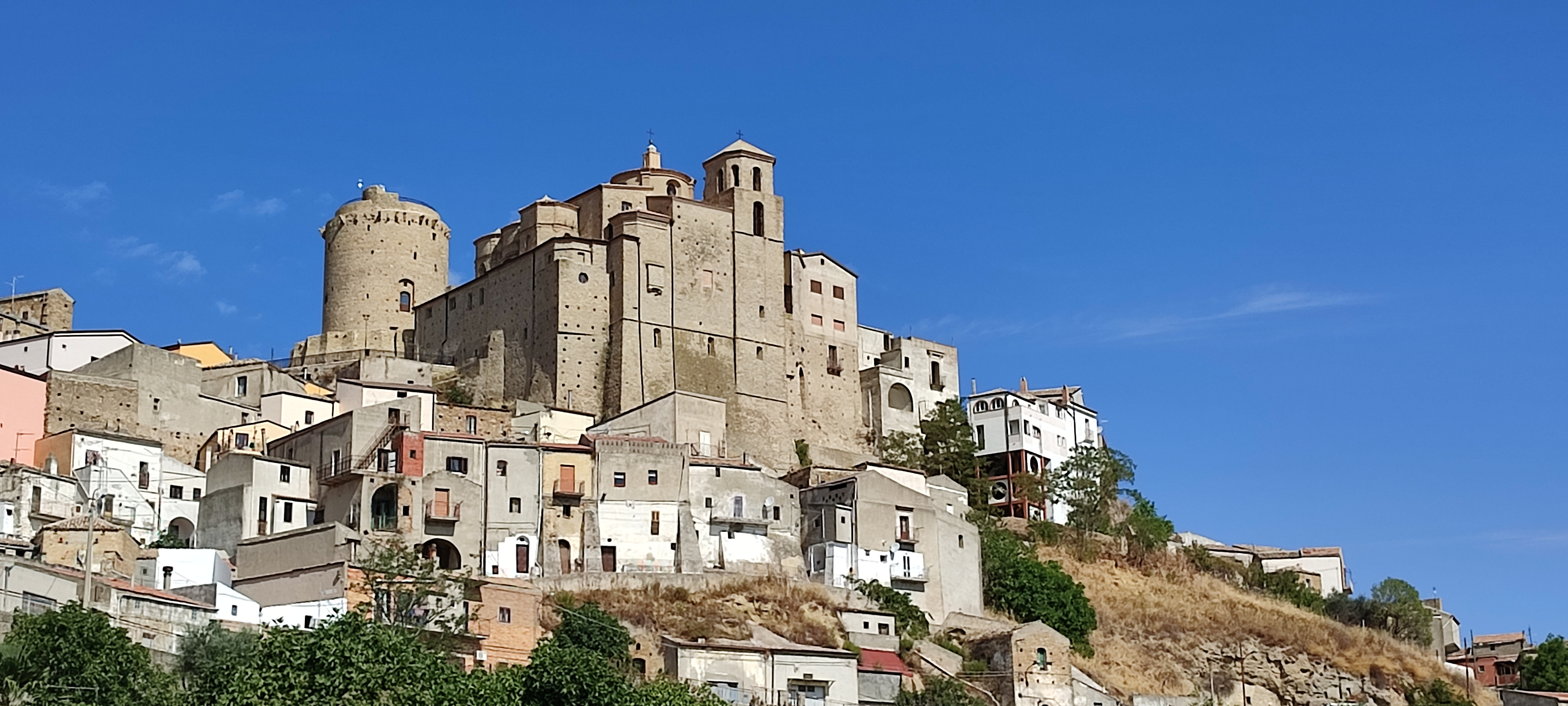
View of the village

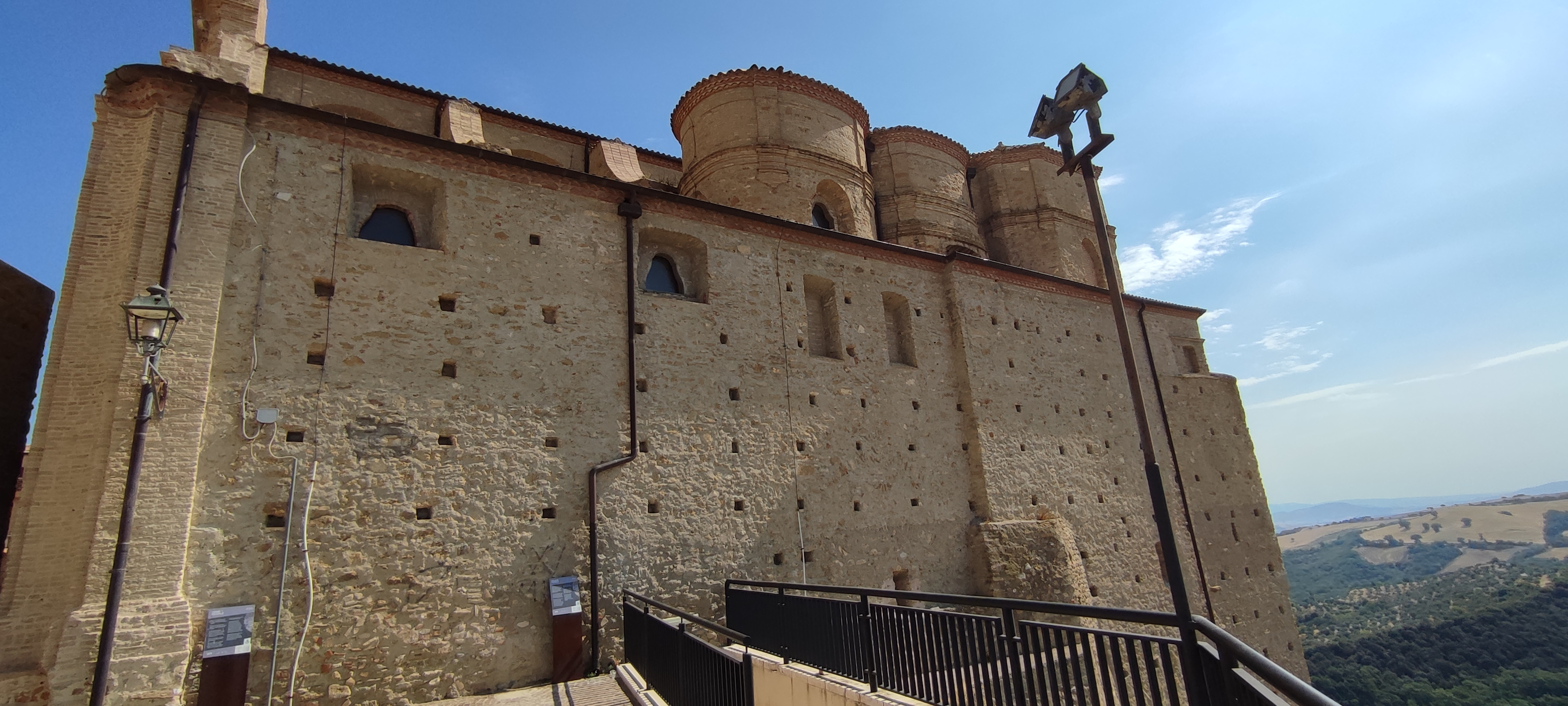
La Chiesa madre (Main church)

== Demographic ==
Population census

== See also ==
- Carnival of Satriano di Lucania
