= Cirigliano =

- Comune
- Comune di Cirigliano
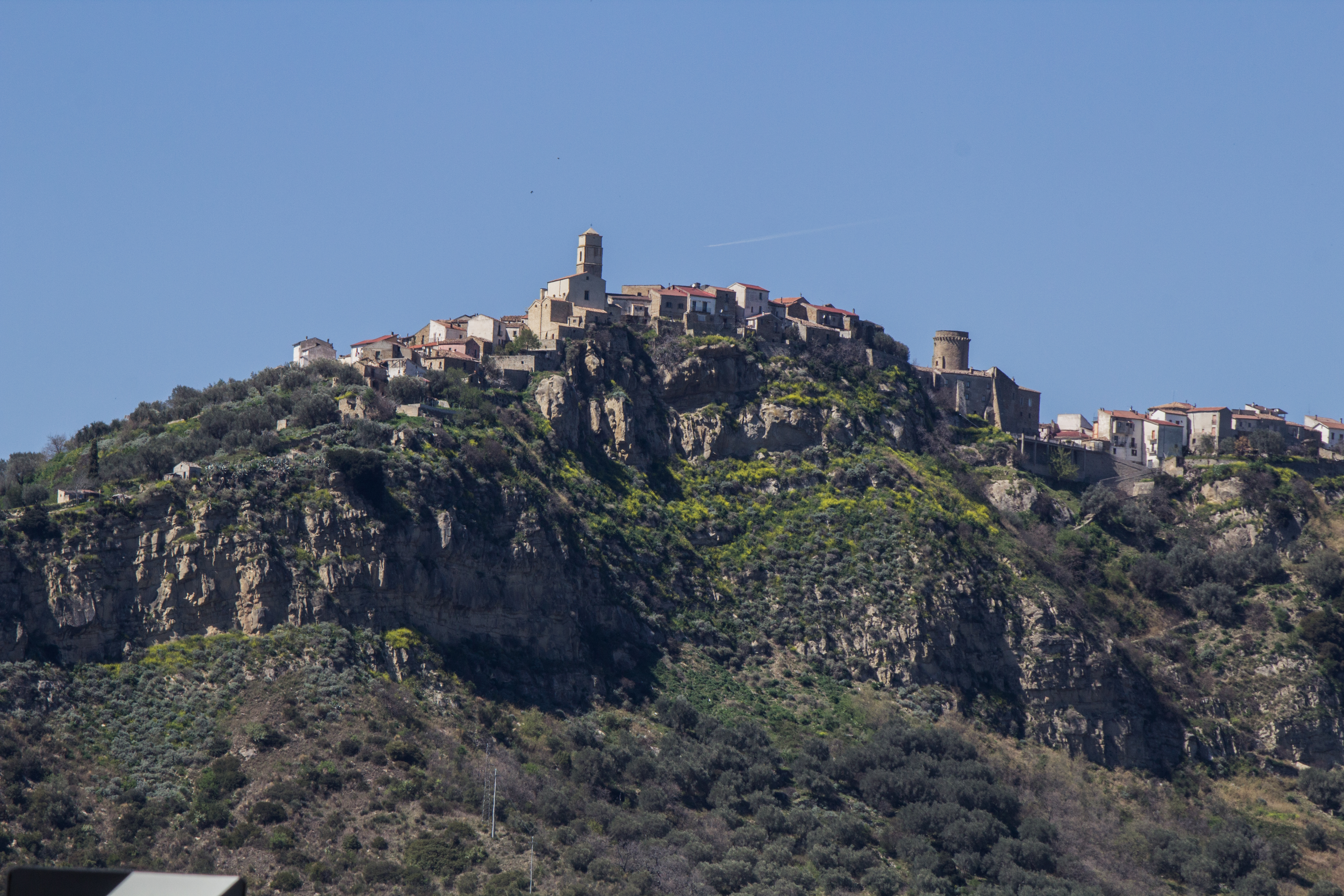
- View of Cirigliano

- Location within Italy Location within Basilicata
- Coordinates: 40°24′N 16°10′E
- Country: Italy
- Region: Basilicata
- Province: Matera (MT)

Area
  - Total: 14.9 km^{2} (5.8 sq mi)
- Elevation: 656 m (2,152 ft)

Population (2018-01-01)
  - Total: 451
  - Density: 30.3/km^{2} (78.4/sq mi)
- Demonym: Ciriglianesi
- Time zone: UTC+1 (CET)
  - Summer (DST): UTC+2 (CEST)
- Postal code: 75010
- Dialing code: 0835
- ISTAT code: 077005
- Patron saint: San Giacomo
- Saint day: 25 July

Cirigliano (Italian pronunciation: [tʃiriʎˈʎaːno]; Lucano: Cëregliànë) is a town and comune in the province of Matera, in the Southern Italian region of Basilicata.

Cirigliano is an ancient town whose origin is uncertain. It is surrounded by walls and towers. Cirigliano is a typical medieval village which still has a castle tower with an oval base and a chapel within its walls. It has a 17th-century “Pieta” in a decorated wood temple.

== History ==
The earliest written evidence of the existence of the town dates back to 1060, from a document of the Diocese of Tricarico. Its etymology derives from Caerellius because it was built on the property of Cerellio, a presumed Roman centurion who was granted these lands for his merits on the battlefield. It is said that Cirigliano was a mandatory stop for those traveling from Heraclea to Potenza or Tricarico. The designated places for stopping were the bakery of Cirigliano and the tavern of Acinello.

The town is surrounded by towers and walls, confirming that it is a medieval village. In the center of the town stands the imposing ancient feudal castle with its suggestive oval tower and the adjoining chapel of the Addolorata, in which, among other things, a Pietà from the 17th century is preserved, set in a decorated wooden shrine.

The castle, owned by the Coppola family (purchased by them for 13,000 ducats from the Iannellis family in 1595), was acquired in the post-medieval era (1750) by the barons Formica, who still retain ownership to this day.

On November 12, 1861, formations led by Carmine Crocco and José Borjes moved towards Cirigliano to disarm the militiamen of the local national guard. Welcomed warmly, they stopped for a couple of hours before moving towards Gorgoglione, which they reached in the early afternoon.

== Cuisine ==
Typical dishes of Cirigliano include "letratte," a type of homemade pasta, and "rafanata," a frittata made with horseradish.
