= Calciano =

- Comune
- Comune di Calciano
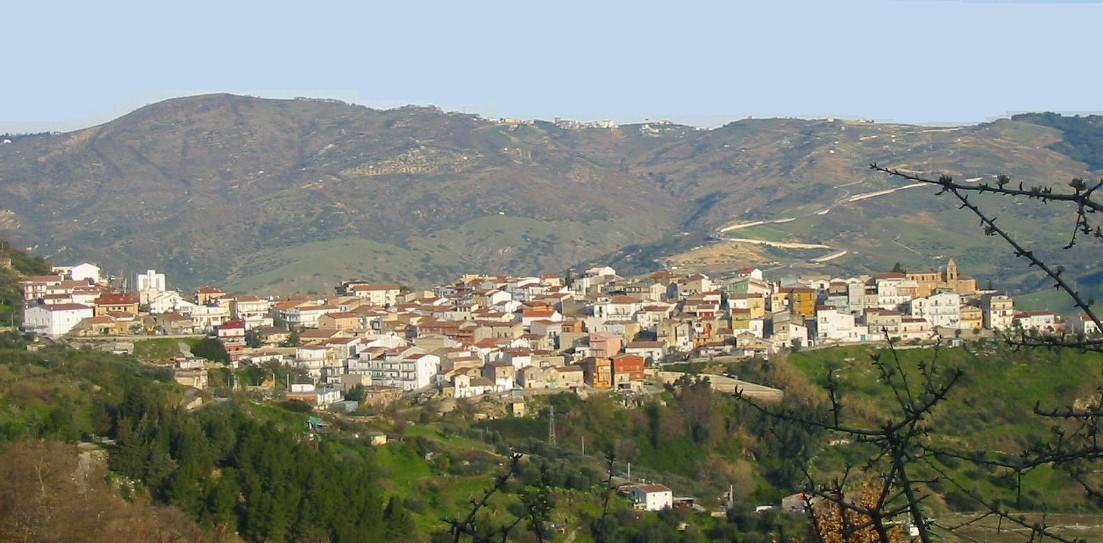
- View of Calciano

- Location within Italy Location within Basilicata
- Coordinates: 40°35′N 16°12′E
- Country: Italy
- Region: Basilicata
- Province: Matera (MT)
- Frazioni: Parata

Government
  - Mayor: Giuseppe Arturo De Filippo

Area
  - Total: 49.69 km^{2} (19.19 sq mi)
- Elevation: 420 m (1,380 ft)

Population (30 April 2017)
  - Total: 748
  - Density: 15.1/km^{2} (39.0/sq mi)
- Demonym: Calcianesi
- Time zone: UTC+1 (CET)
  - Summer (DST): UTC+2 (CEST)
- Postal code: 75010
- Dialing code: 0835
- ISTAT code: 077004
- Website: Official website

Calciano (Neapolitan: Caucesciàne) is a town and comune in the province of Matera, in the Southern Italian region of Basilicata.

== Gallery ==
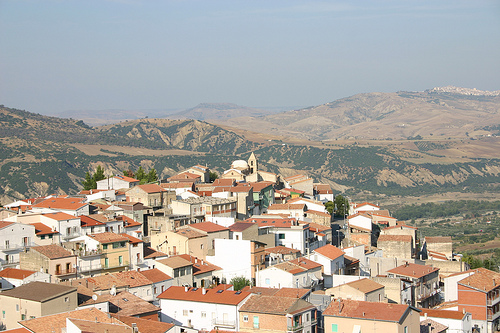
View of Calciano

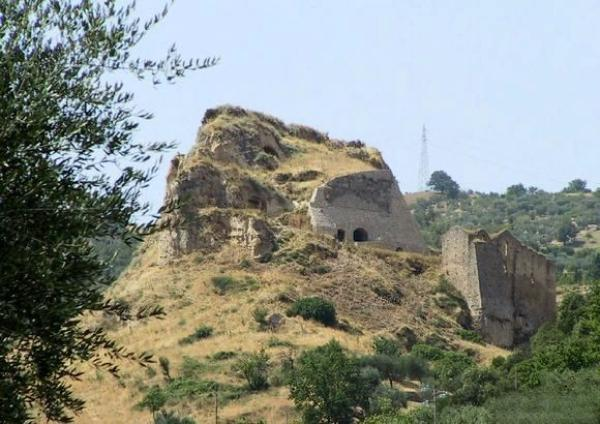
Ruins of the Byzantine Castle

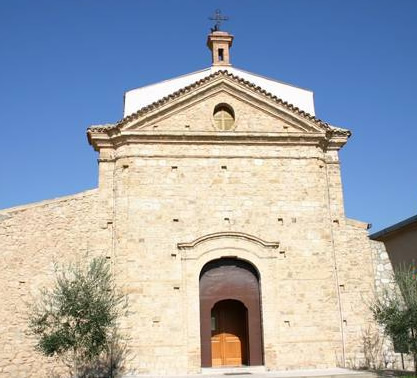
The main church dedicated to Saint John the Baptist
