= Gorgoglione =

- Comune
- Comune di Gorgoglione
- Coat of arms

- Location within Italy Location within Basilicata
- Coordinates: 40°24′N 16°9′E
- Country: Italy
- Region: Basilicata
- Province: Matera (MT)

Government
  - Mayor: Carmine Nigro

Area
  - Total: 34.93 km^{2} (13.49 sq mi)
- Elevation: 800 m (2,600 ft)

Population (31 December 2010)
  - Total: 1,064
  - Density: 30.46/km^{2} (78.89/sq mi)
- Demonym: Gorgoglionesi
- Time zone: UTC+1 (CET)
  - Summer (DST): UTC+2 (CEST)
- Postal code: 75010
- Dialing code: 0835
- ISTAT code: 077010
- Patron saint: St. Antony of Padua
- Saint day: 13 June
- Website: Official website

Gorgoglione (Lucano: Gruùglionë) is a town and comune in the province of Matera, in the Southern Italian region of Basilicata.
