= Tricarico =

Tricarico Trëcàrëchë (Neapolitan)
- Comune
- Comune di Tricarico
- Norman tower and Monastery of Santa Chiara

- Coat of arms

- Location within Italy Location within Basilicata
- Coordinates: 40°37′N 16°9′E
- Country: Italy
- Region: Basilicata
- Province: Matera (MT)
- Frazioni: Calle

Government
  - Mayor: Vincenzo Carbone

Area
  - Total: 178.16 km^{2} (68.79 sq mi)
- Elevation: 698 m (2,290 ft)

Population (March 2009)
  - Total: 5,920
  - Density: 33.2/km^{2} (86.1/sq mi)
- Demonym: Tricaricési
- Time zone: UTC+1 (CET)
  - Summer (DST): UTC+2 (CEST)
- Postal code: 75019
- Dialing code: 0835
- ISTAT code: 077028
- Patron saint: St. Potitus
- Saint day: 14 January
- Website: Official website

Tricarico (Lucano: Trëcàrëchë IPA: [trəˈkæːrəkə]; Greek: Τριακρικόν, romanized: Triakrikon) is a town and comune in the province of Matera, Basilicata, southern Italy.

It is home to one of the best preserved medieval historical centres in Lucania.

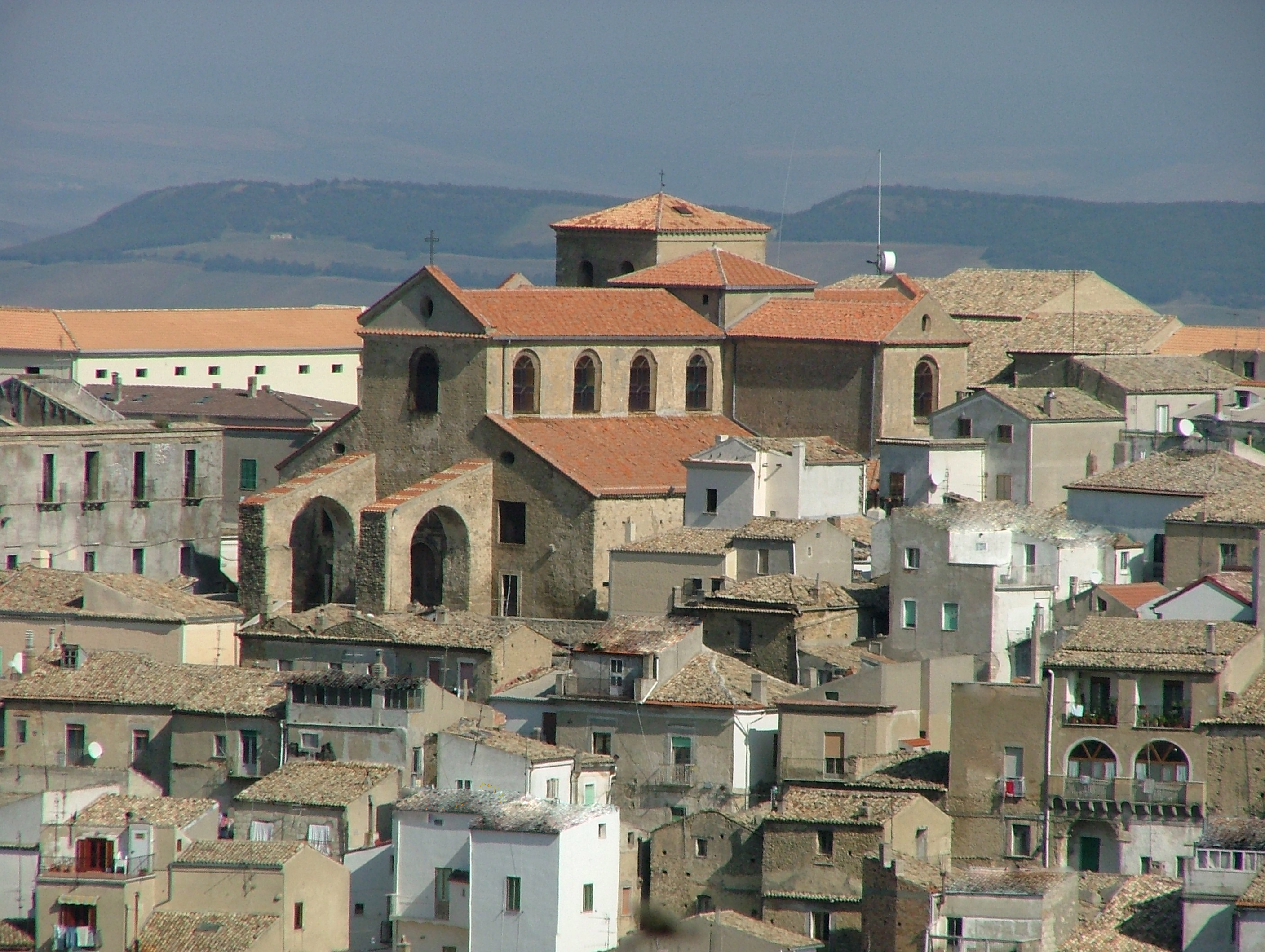
Cathedral of Tricarico

== Etymology ==
The origin of the name Tricarico is unknown. It might derive from the Greek τρία treis ("three") and cara (head/skull in Hellenistic-era Greek: η κάρα, τό κάρα, η κάρη). That is "having three heads". According to a slightly different hypothesis, it could have originally been Triacricon, deriving from the Greek words tria/treis and acron/acra, which during Antiquity and Early Middle Ages meant both an "apex/summit", and a "citadel", with Triacricon thus meaning a city made by connecting "three citadels". These three acra/citadels were no other than the site of the 9th c Arabic castle of Saracena in the north, the site of a 9th-10th c Byzantine Rocca fortificata in the south, improved during the 11th-12th c by the Normans, and then, during the 13th c, by the Hohenstaufen, and also the site of the 14th c Palazzo Ducale in the middle. Probably the three sites were simultaneously fortified even before the successive occupations.

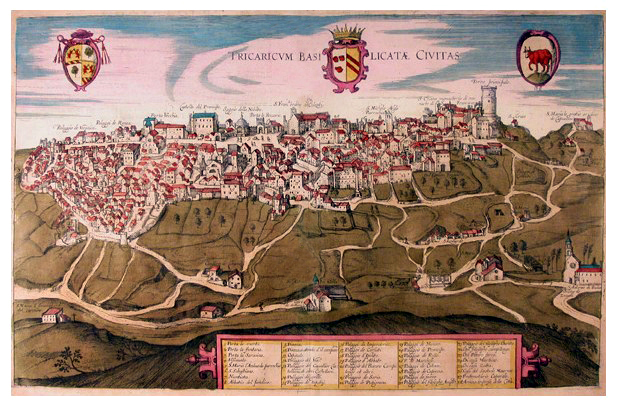
Triacricon/Tricaricum, depicting the three citadels of the city, with the north to south orientation, shown from left to right

== History ==
Although of ancient origin, the first news documented about the town dates to 849, when it was a Lombard county included in the gastaldate of Salerno. Later (9th century - late 10th century) it was an Arab stronghold. The terrace gardens, of Arabic origin, are still in use today. In 968 Tricarico was conquered by the Byzantine Empire, and then, in 1048, it became a Norman fortified town.

In the 15th century, there was a Jewish community.

== Main sights ==
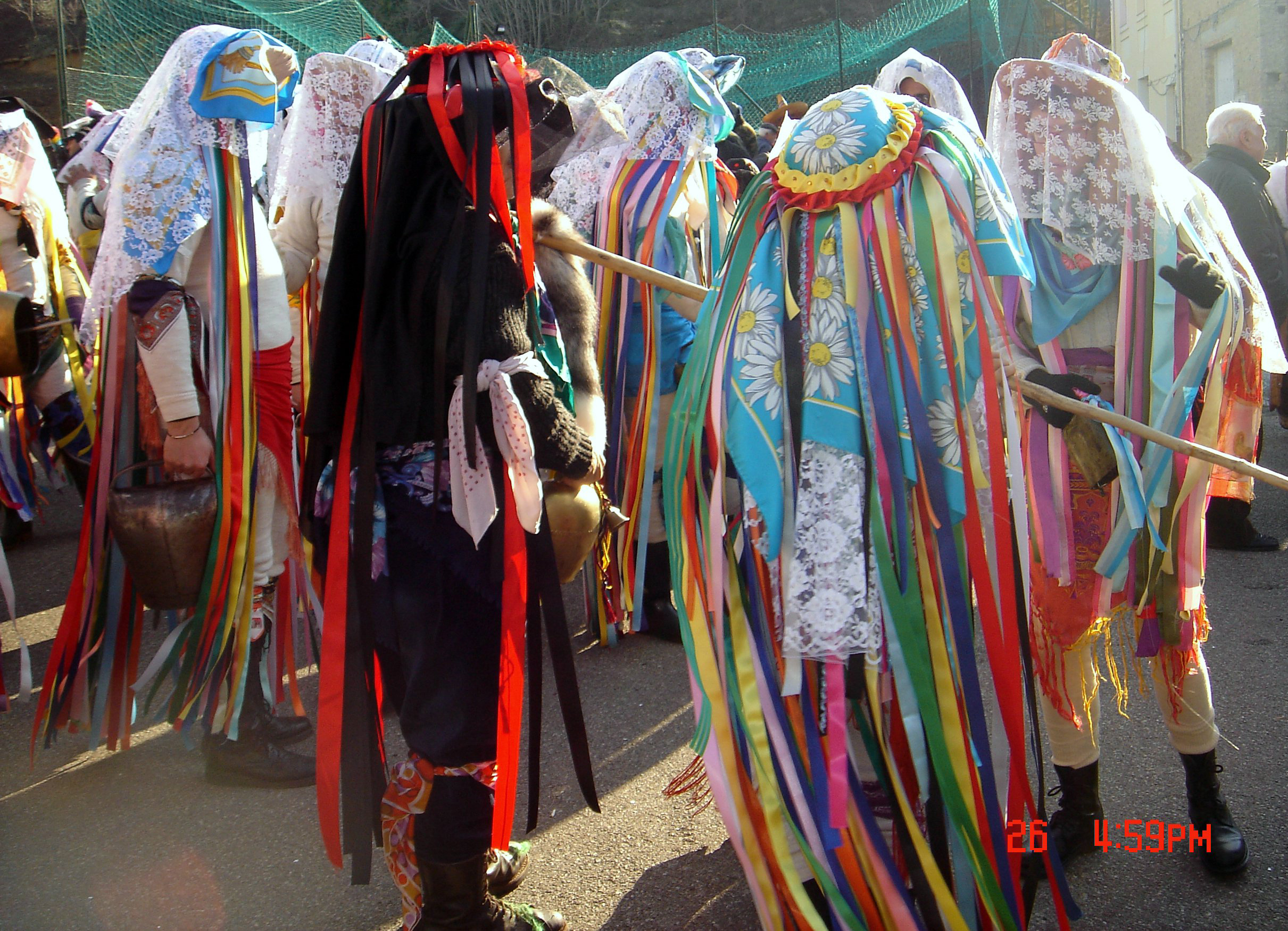
Tricarico Carnival (Carnevale di Tricarico), which takes place every January

The roads and alleys of the historical center reflect the Arabic quarters of the Ràbata and the Saracena.

Sights in the town include:

- Cathedral of the Assunta, built by Robert Guiscard. Here, in 1383, Louis I of Anjou was crowned king of Naples.
- Norman tower, with a height of 27 metres (89 ft).
- Towers of Ràbata and Saracena.
- Ducal Palace, now home to the archaeological museum
- Sanctuary of Madonna di Fonti

The archaeological area of Civita is situated outside the city. It includes a Roman fortified center that extends for approximately 50 hectares (120 acres) and consists of stone buildings with squared blocks, fortified with monumental doors. In the interior, some rooms have mosaic pavements over 2,500 years old.

Also present is the Cerra del Cedro archaeological site, inhabited from as early as the 6th century to the 3rd century BC.
