= Basilicata =

Region of Italy

Basilicata Lucania
- Region
- Flag Coat of arms

- Location of Basilicata in Italy
- Coordinates: 40.5°N 16°E
- Country: Italy
- Capital: Potenza

Government
  - Type: Presidential system
  - President: Vito Bardi (FI)
  - Vice President: Pasquale Pepe

Area
  - Total: 10,073.32 km^{2} (3,889.33 sq mi)

Population (2026)
  - Total: 525,281
  - Density: 52.1458/km^{2} (135.057/sq mi)
- Demonym(s): English: Lucanian; Italian: lucano (m. sing.), lucani (m. pl.), lucana (f. sing.), lucane (f. pl.); basilicatese (sing.), basilicatesi (pl.)

GDP
  - Total: €15.083 billion (2024)
  - Per capita: €28,458 (2024)
- Time zone: UTC+1 (CET)
  - Summer (DST): UTC+2 (CEST)
- ISO 3166 code: IT-77
- HDI (2021): 0.865 very high · 17th of 21
- NUTS Region: ITF
- Website: www.regione.basilicata.it

Basilicata, (Note: (UK: /bəˌsɪlɪˈkɑːtə/ bə-SIL-ih-KAH-tə, US: /-ˌzɪl-/ -ZIL-, Italian: [baziliˈkaːta])) also known by its ancient name Lucania, (Note: (/luːˈkeɪniə/ loo-KAY-nee-ə, US also /luːˈkɑːnjə/ loo-KAHN-yə, Italian: [luˈkaːnja]) is an administrative region in Southern Italy, bordering on Campania to the west, Apulia to the north and east, and Calabria to the south. It has two coastlines: a 30-kilometre stretch on the Gulf of Policastro (Tyrrhenian Sea) between Campania and Calabria, and a longer coastline along the Gulf of Taranto (Ionian Sea) between Calabria and Apulia. The region can be thought of as "the arch" of "the boot" of Italy, with Calabria functioning as "the toe" and Apulia "the heel".

In ancient times, part of its territory (then known as Lucania and inhabited by Lucanians, an ancient Italic population) belonged to Magna Graecia, subject to coastal Greek colonies (including Sybaris). Later the region was conquered by the ancient Romans. It was then conquered by the Byzantines, and then by the Normans around the year 1000 with the Hauteville family. Their presence explains the persistence of the Gallo-Italic linguistic enclaves of Basilicata. The area was later dominated by the Aragonese and by the Spanish. Subsequently, it became part of the Kingdom of the Two Sicilies, before annexation to the unified Kingdom of Italy (proclaimed in 1861) after the 1860 Expedition of the Thousand.

Basilicata has a population of 525,281 in an area of 10,073.32 km^{2} (3,889.33 sq mi). The regional capital is Potenza. The region comprises the province of Potenza and the province of Matera. Its inhabitants are generally known as Lucanians (Italian: lucani), and to a lesser extent as basilicatesi or by other more rare terms.

== Etymology ==
The name probably derives from basilikos (Greek: βασιλικός), which refers to the basileus, the Byzantine emperors, who ruled the region for 200 years as the Catepanate of Italy, from roughly 536/552 to 571/590 and from 879 to 1059. Others argue that the name may refer to the Basilica of Acerenza, which held judicial power in the Middle Ages. During the ancient Greek and Roman eras, Basilicata was known as Lucania. This was possibly derived from leukos (Greek: λευκός), meaning "white", from lykos (Greek: λύκος), meaning "wolf", or from Latin lūcus, meaning "sacred wood". More probably, the name Lucania derived, like the forename (praenomen) Lucius, from the Latin word Lux (gen. lucis), meaning "light" (from PIE *leuk-, "brightness", also the root of the Latin verb lucere, "to shine"), which is a cognate of the name Lucas. Another proposed etymology is a derivation from the Etruscan word Lauchum (or Lauchme), meaning "king", which passed into Latin as Lucumo.

== History ==
=== Prehistory ===
The first traces of human presence in Basilicata date to the late Paleolithic, with findings of Homo erectus. Late Cenozoic fossils, found at Venosa and other locations, include elephants, rhinoceros and species now extinct such as a saber-toothed cat of the genus Machairodus. Examples of rock art from the Mesolithic have been discovered near Filiano. From the fifth millennium, people stopped living in caves and built settlements of huts up to the rivers leading to the interior (Tolve, Tricarico, Aliano, Melfi, and Metaponto). In this period, anatomically modern humans lived by cultivating cereals and animal husbandry (Bovinae and Caprinae). Chalcolithic sites include the grottoes of Latronico and the funerary findings of the Cervaro grotto near Lagonegro.

The first known stable market center of the Apennine culture on the sea, consisting of huts on the promontory of Capo la Timpa, near to Maratea, dates to the Bronze Age. The first indigenous Iron Age communities lived in large villages in plateaus located at the borders of the plains and the rivers, in places fitting their breeding and agricultural activities. Such settlements include that of Tursi, known at the time as Anglona, located between the fertile valleys of Agri and Sinni, of Siris and, on the coast of the Ionian Sea, of Incoronata-San Teodoro. The first presence of Greek colonists, coming from the Greek islands and Anatolia, date from the late eighth century BC. There are virtually no traces of survival of the 11th–8th century BC archaeological sites of the settlements (aside from a necropolis at Castelluccio on the coast of the Tyrrhenian Sea): this was perhaps caused by the increasing presence of Greek colonies, which changed the balance of the trades.

=== Ancient history ===
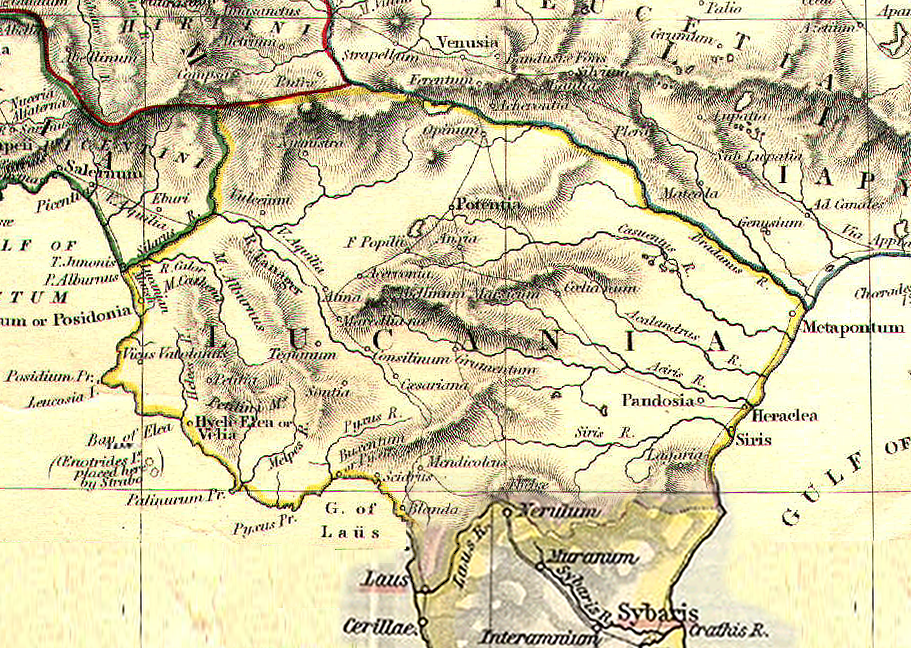
The ancient region of Lucania

In ancient historical times, the region was originally known as Lucania, named for the Lucani, an Oscan-speaking population from central Italy. Starting from the late 8th century BC, the Greeks established a settlement first at Siris, founded by fugitives from Colophon. Then with the foundation of Metaponto from Achaean colonists, they started the conquest of the whole Ionian coast. There were also indigenous Oenotrian foundations on the coast, which exploited the nearby presence of Greek settlements, such as Velia and Pyxous, for their maritime trades. The region became one of the centers of Magna Graecia, with the foundation along its coasts of many Greek city-states (póleis). The first contacts between the Lucanians and the Romans date from the latter half of the fourth century BC. After the conquest of Taranto in 272, Roman rule was extended to the whole region: the Appian Way reached Brindisi and the colonies of Potentia (modern Potenza) and Grumentum were founded.

=== Middle Ages ===
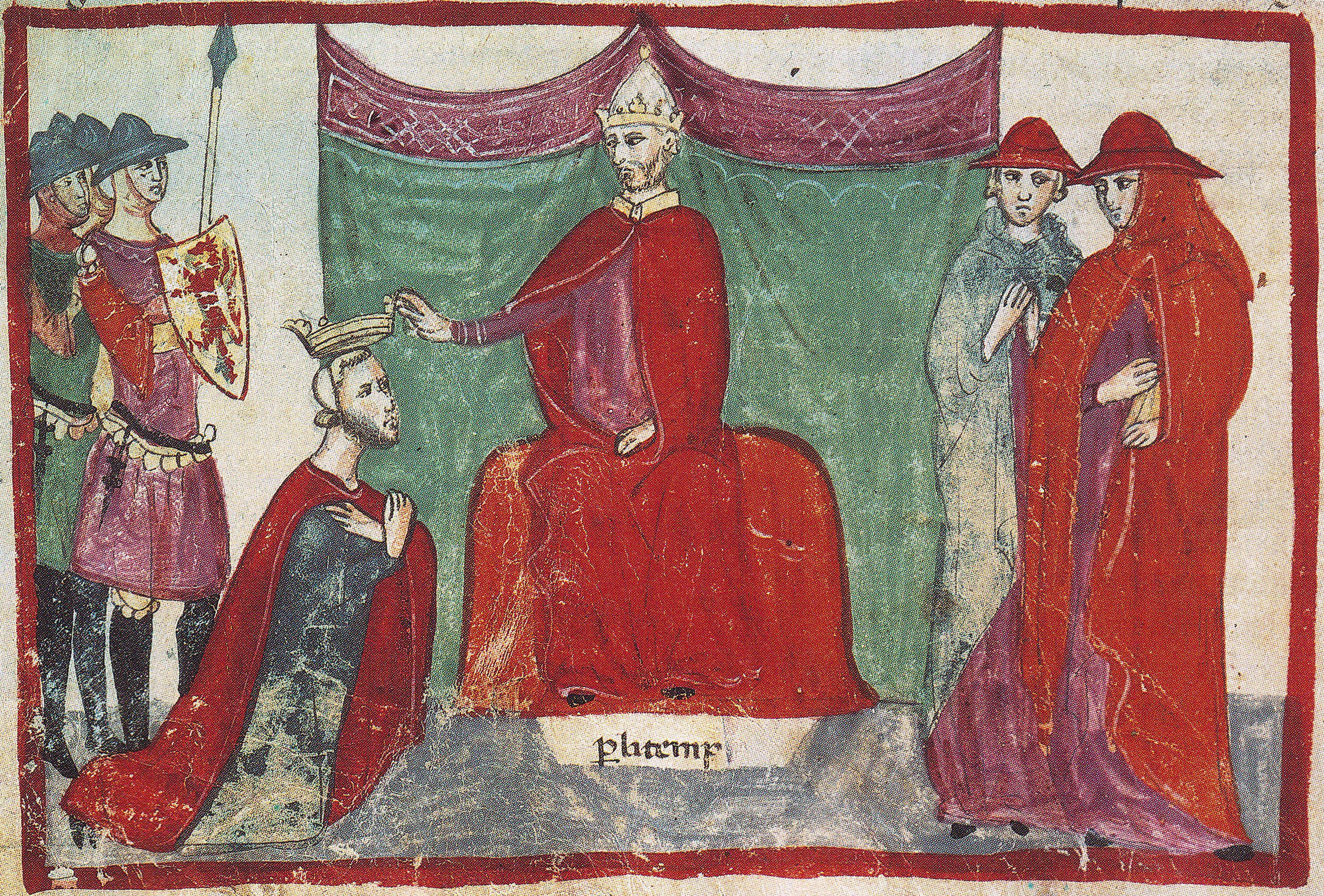
Pope Nicholas II investing Robert Guiscard as duke in Melfi

After the fall of the Western Roman Empire in 476, Basilicata fell to Germanic rule, which ended in the mid-6th century when the Byzantines reconquered it from the Ostrogoths between 536 and 552 during the apocalyptic Byzantine-Gothic war under the leadership of Byzantine generals Belisarius and Narses. The region, deeply Christianized since as early as the 5th century, became part of the Lombard Duchy of Benevento founded by the invading Lombards between 571 and 590.

In the following centuries, Saracen raids led part of the population to move from the plain and coastal settlements to more protected centers located on hills. The towns of Tricarico and Tursi were under Muslim rule for a short period; the Saracen population would later be expelled. The region was conquered once more for Byzantium from the Saracens and the Lombards in the late 9th century, with the campaigns of Nikephoros Phokas the Elder and his successors, and became part of the theme of Longobardia. In 968, the theme of Lucania was established, with the capital at Tursikon (Tursi).

In the 11th century, Basilicata, together with the rest of much of southern Italy, was conquered by the Normans. Melfi became the first capital of the County of Apulia (later County of Apulia and Calabria) in 1043, where Robert Guiscard was named "Duke" by Pope Nicholas II. Inherited by the Hohenstaufen, a medieval German royal and imperial dynasty, Frederick II reorganized the administrative structure of his predecessors and the Justiciarate of Basilicata, whose borders coincided almost entirely with the actual region, was created. In Melfi, the Emperor promulgated the Liber Augustalis (commonly known as Constitutions of Melfi), code of laws for the Kingdom of Sicily. The Swabians were ousted in the 13th century by the Capetian House of Anjou. Since then, Basilicata began to lose importance and was marked by an irreversible socio-political decline.

=== Modern and contemporary times ===
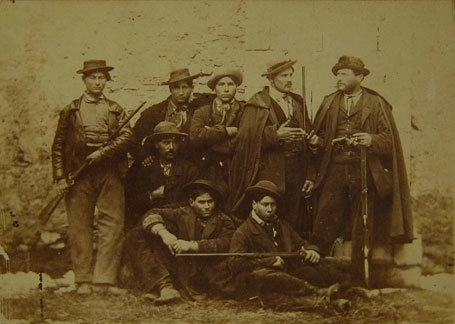
Band of brigands from Basilicata, c. 1860

In 1485, Basilicata was the seat of plotters against King Ferdinand I of Naples, the so-called conspiracy of the Barons, which included the Sanseverino of Tricarico, the Caracciolo of Melfi, the Gesualdo of Caggiano, the Orsini del Balzo of Altamura and Venosa and other anti-Aragonese families. Later, Charles V stripped most of the barons of their lands, replacing them with the Carafa, Revertera, Pignatelli and Colonna among others. After the formation of the Neapolitan Republic in 1647, Basilicata also rebelled, but the revolt was suppressed. In 1663, a new province was created in Basilicata with its capital in Matera.

The region came under the dominion of the House of Bourbon in 1735. Basilicata autonomously declared its annexation to the Kingdom of Italy on 18 August 1860 with the Potenza insurrection. It was during this period that the state confiscated and sold off vast tracts of Basilicata's territory formerly owned by the Catholic Church. As the new owners were a handful of wealthy aristocratic families, the average citizen did not see any immediate economic and social improvements after unification, and poverty continued unabated.

This gave rise to the phenomenon of brigandage, which actually turned into a civil war in the form of a guerrilla fighting, whereby the Bourbon in exile and the Church encouraged the peasants to rise up against the Kingdom of Italy. This strong opposition movement continued for many years. The revolt in Basilicata was led by Carmine Crocco, who was the most important chief in the region and the most impressive band leader in southern Italy. After World War II, conditions improved thanks to land reform. In 1952, the inhabitants of the Sassi di Matera were rehoused by the state but many of Basilicata's population had emigrated or were in the process of emigrating, which led to a demographic crisis from which it is still recovering.

== Geography ==
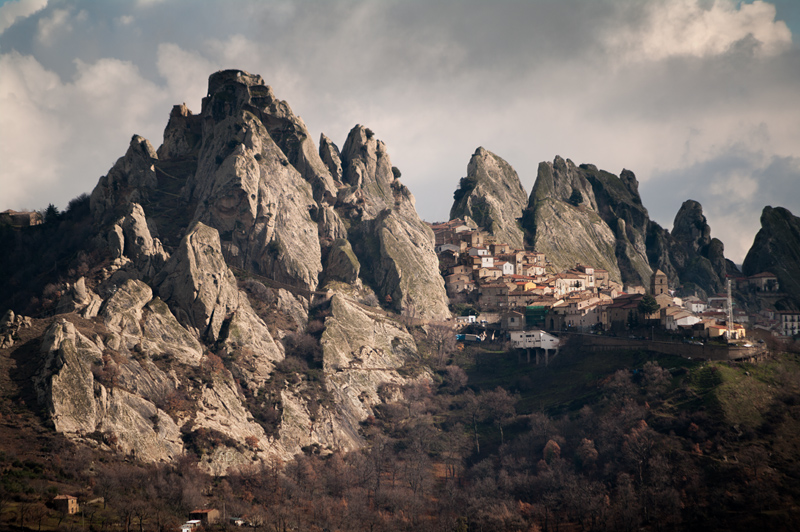
Dolomiti lucane and Pietrapertosa

Basilicata covers an extensive part of the southern Apennine Mountains, between the Ofanto river in the north and the Pollino massif in the south. It is bordered on the east by a large part of the Bradano river depression, which is traversed by numerous streams and declines to the southeastern coastal plains on the Ionian Sea. The region also has a short coastline to the southwest on the Tyrrhenian Sea side of the peninsula.

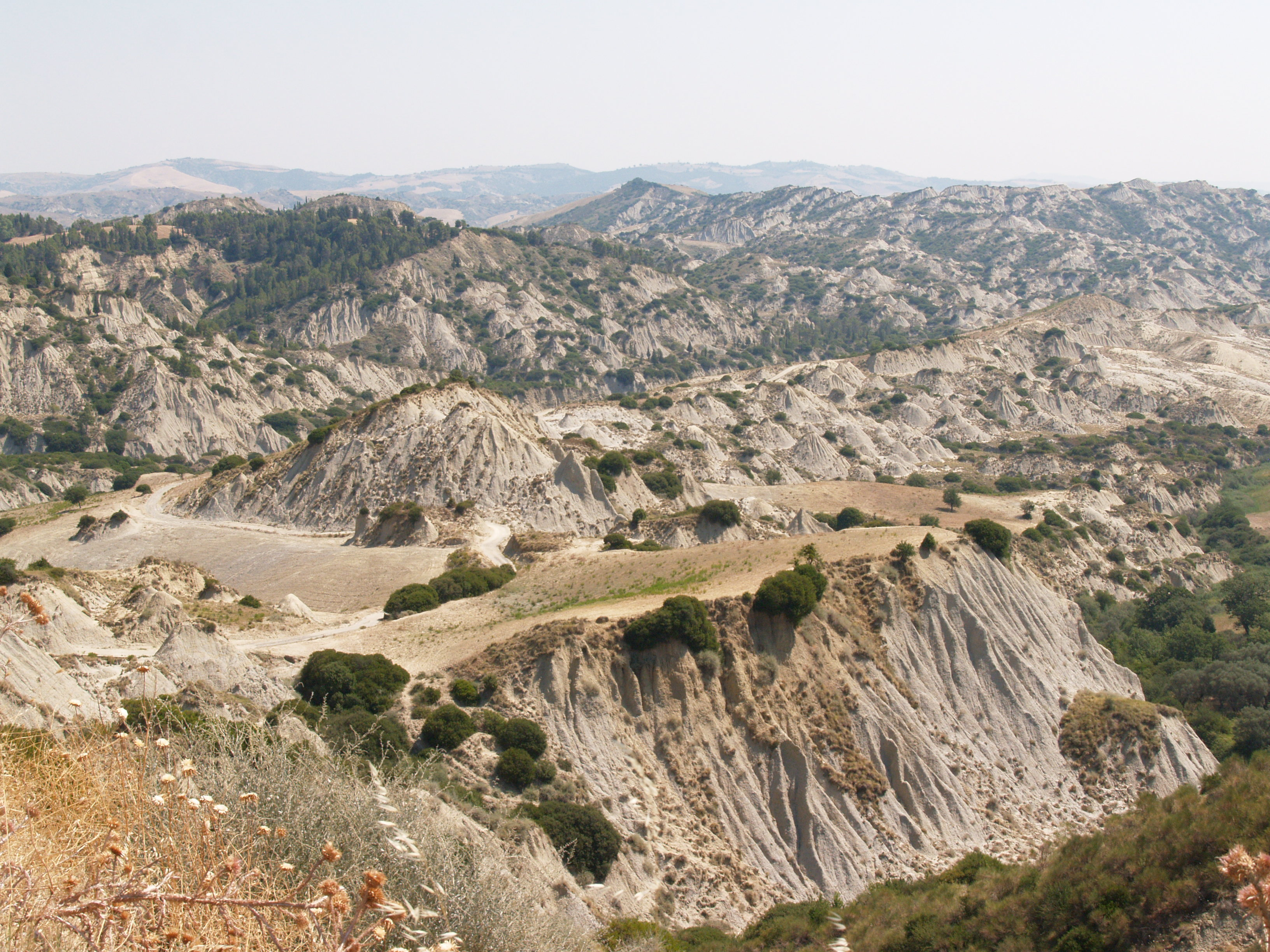
Badlands in Aliano

Basilicata is the most mountainous region in the south of Italy, with 47% of its area of 9,992 km^{2} (3,858 sq mi) covered by mountains. Of the remaining area, 45% is hilly, and 8% is made up of plains. Notable mountains and ranges include the Pollino massif, the Dolomiti lucane, Monte Vulture, Monte Alpi, Monte Carmine, Monti Li Foj and Toppa Pizzuta. Geological features of the region include the volcanic formations of Monte Vulture, and the seismic faults in the Melfi and Potenza areas in the north, and around Pollino in the south. Much of the region was devastated in the 1857 Basilicata earthquake. In the 20th century, the 1980 Irpinia earthquake destroyed many towns in the northwest of the region.

The mountainous terrain combined with weak rock and soil types makes landslides prevalent. The lithological structure of the substratum and its chaotic tectonic deformation predispose the slope to landslides, and this problem is compounded by the lack of forested land. In common with many another Mediterranean regions, Basilicata was once rich in forests, but they were largely felled and made barren during the time of Roman rule. The variable climate is influenced by three coastlines (Adriatic, Ionian and Tyrrhenian) and the complexity of the region's physical features. In general, the climate is continental in the mountains and Mediterranean along the coasts.

== Government ==
Map of the provinces of Basilicata

The regional government operates within a framework of a presidential representative democracy, whereby the president is the head of government, and of a pluriform multi-party system. Executive power is exercised by the government. Legislative power is vested in both the government and the regional council.

=== Administrative divisions ===
Basilicata is divided into two provinces: the province of Matera and the province of Potenza.

Province	Population (2026)	Area (km^{2})	Density (inh./km^{2})	Capital	Municipalities
Matera	187,754	3,478.89	54.0	Matera	31
Potenza	337,527	6,594.44	51.2	Potenza	100

== Demographics ==
Historical population
Year	Pop.	±%
1861	509,060	—
1871	524,033	+2.9%
1881	539,258	+2.9%
1901	491,558	−8.8%
1911	485,911	−1.1%
1921	492,132	+1.3%
1931	513,712	+4.4%
1936	543,262	+5.8%
1951	627,586	+15.5%
1961	644,297	+2.7%
1971	603,064	−6.4%
1981	610,186	+1.2%
1991	610,528	+0.1%
2001	597,768	−2.1%
2011	578,036	−3.3%
2021	541,168	−6.4%
Source: ISTAT

As of 2026, the population is 525,281, of which 49.6% are male, and 50.4% are female. Minors make up 13.4% of the population, and seniors make up 26.6%.

Although Basilicata has never had a large population, there have nevertheless been quite considerable fluctuations in the demographic pattern of the region. In 1881, there were 539,258 inhabitants but by 1911 the population had decreased by 10% to 485,911, mainly as a result of emigration overseas. There was a slow increase in the population until World War II, after which there was a resurgence of emigration to other countries in Europe, which continued until 1971 and the start of another period of steady increase until the 1980s at 610,000 inhabitants. Since the 1990s the population has been declining again, as a result of low birth rates and high emigration, especially towards northern Italy, the UK, Germany and Switzerland.

The population density is very low compared to that of Italy as a whole: With 52.6 inhabitants per km^{2} compared to the nationwide density of 195.1, it is the 2nd-least densely populated region of Italy after the Aosta Valley. Religion, particularly Roman Catholicism, still maintains a solid role in the culture and everyday lives of people in Basilicata. Italian National Statistical Institute (ISTAT) in 2018 found that 24.9% of the population went weekly to church, synagogue, mosque, temple, or other place of worship, with the share of practicing believers higher in Basilicata (27.9%).

=== Foreign population ===
As of 2025, immigrants make up 7.1% of the population. The 5 largest foreign countries of birth are Romania, Albania, Switzerland, Germany, and Morocco.

Foreign population by country of birth (2025)
Country of birth	Population
Romania	6,472
Albania	3,145
Switzerland	3,121
Germany	2,824
Morocco	1,937
Argentina	1,529
Bangladesh	1,435
Ukraine	1,373
Tunisia	939
India	925
Nigeria	911
Pakistan	846
China	825
Brazil	744
Venezuela	730

== Economy ==
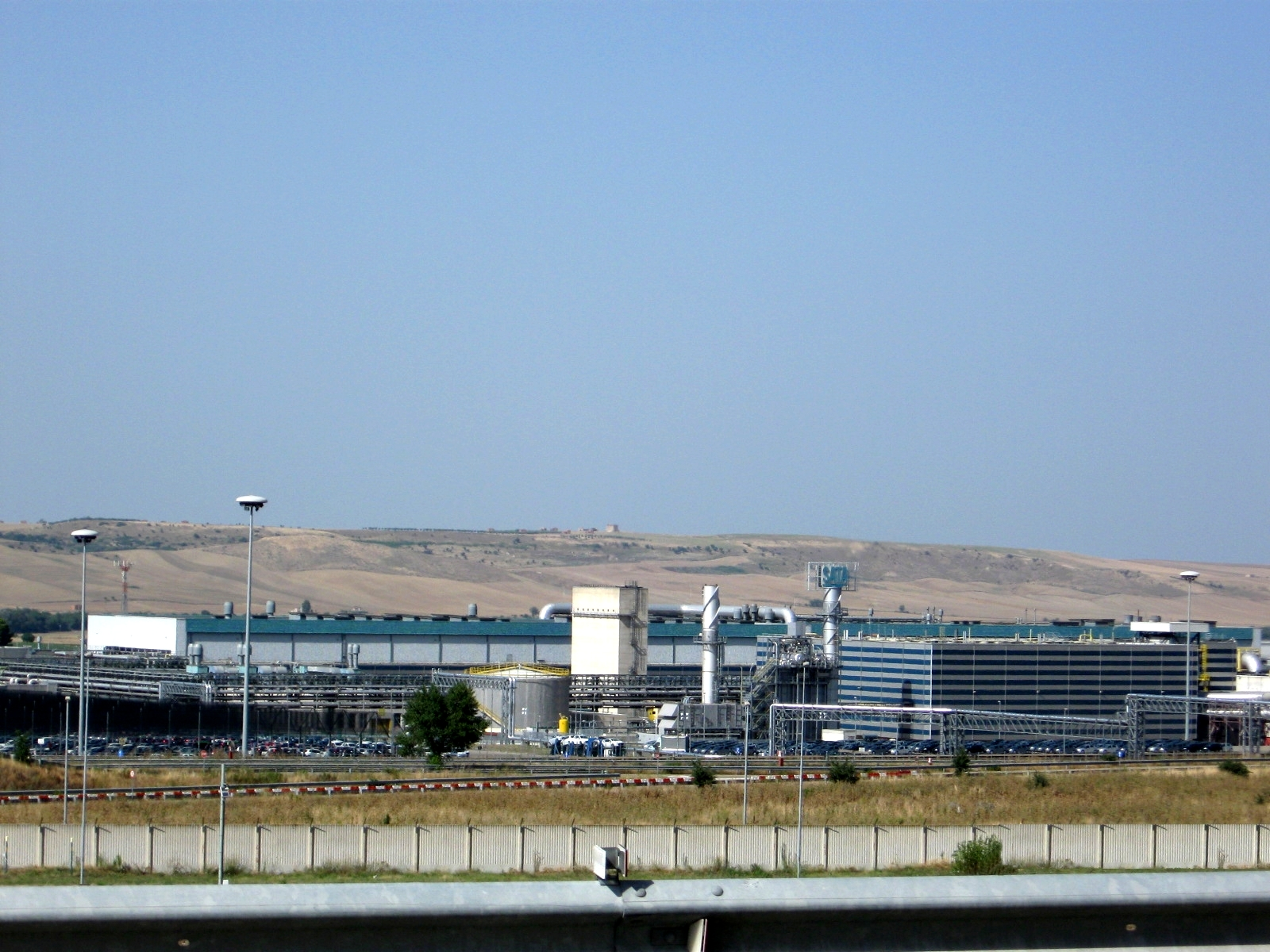
Fiat plant in Melfi

Cultivation consists mainly of sowables (especially wheat), which represent 46% of the total land. Potatoes and maize are produced in the mountain areas. Olives and wine production are relatively small with about 31,000 hectares (77,000 acres) under cultivation. The terrain is mountainous and hilly with poor transportation routes that hinders harvesting. Most oils are sold unbranded and 3% is exported. The main olive cultivars are Ogliarola del Vulture, Ogliarola del Bradano, Majatica di Ferrandina, and Farasana, with Ogliarola del Vulture having the Protected Designation of Origin (PDO). Other varieties are the Arnasca, Ascolana, Augellina, Cellina, Frantoio, Leccino, Majatica, Nostrale, Ogliarola (Ogliarola Barese), Palmarola or Fasolina, Rapolese di Lavello, and Sargano (Sargano di Fermo and Sargano di San Benedetto).

Among industrial activities, the manufacturing sector contributes to the gross value added of the secondary sector with 64% of the total, while the building sector contributes 24%. Within the services sector, the main activities in terms of gross value added are business activities, distributive trade, education and public administration. In the last few years, new productive sectors have developed: manufacturing, automotive, and especially oil extraction. In 2009, Eni employed 230 people in this area (of whom over 50% were from Basilicata), and about 1,800 were employed in activities directly generated by Eni's operations, distributed in 80 companies of which over 50% were from Basilicata. The region produced about 100,000 bbl/d (16,000 m^{3}/d), meeting 11 percent of Italy's domestic oil demand.

The Fiat plant in Melfi has 7,200 employees and manufactured 229,848 Jeep Renegade, Jeep Compass, and Fiat 500X in 2020. The gross domestic product (GDP) of the region was 12.6 billion euros in 2018, accounting for 0.7% of Italy's economic output. GDP per capita adjusted for purchasing power was 22,200 euros or 74% of the EU27 average in the same year. The GDP per employee was 95% of the EU average. The unemployment rate stood at 8.6% in 2020, the lowest rate in South Italy.

=== Transport ===
The region does not have its own airport; however, other airports, such as Bari Airport, Lamezia Terme International Airport, and Naples International Airport, are also used by air travellers from the region.

== Tourism ==
Difficult accessibility and lack of extended promotion make Basilicata one of the most remote and least visited regions of Italy; however, tourism is slowly growing since the early 2000s. Matera, once dubbed "national disgrace" by prime minister Alcide De Gasperi, who urged to take strict development measures due to its extreme poverty, is now Basilicata's main attraction and has gained fame worldwide for its historical center, the Sassi, designated in 1993 as a UNESCO World Heritage Site. In 2019, Matera was designated as the European Capital of Culture.

Seaside tourism is mainly concentrated in Maratea, nicknamed "The Pearl of Tyrrhenian Sea", but also the Ionian coast (Policoro, Pisticci, Bernalda, and Nova Siri) is fairly developed. Naturalistic attractions include Pollino, which hosts the Pollino National Park, the largest national park in Italy, as well as the Dolomiti lucane and Monte Vulture. The New York Times ranked Basilicata third in its list of "52 Places to Go in 2018", describing it as "Italy's best-kept secret".

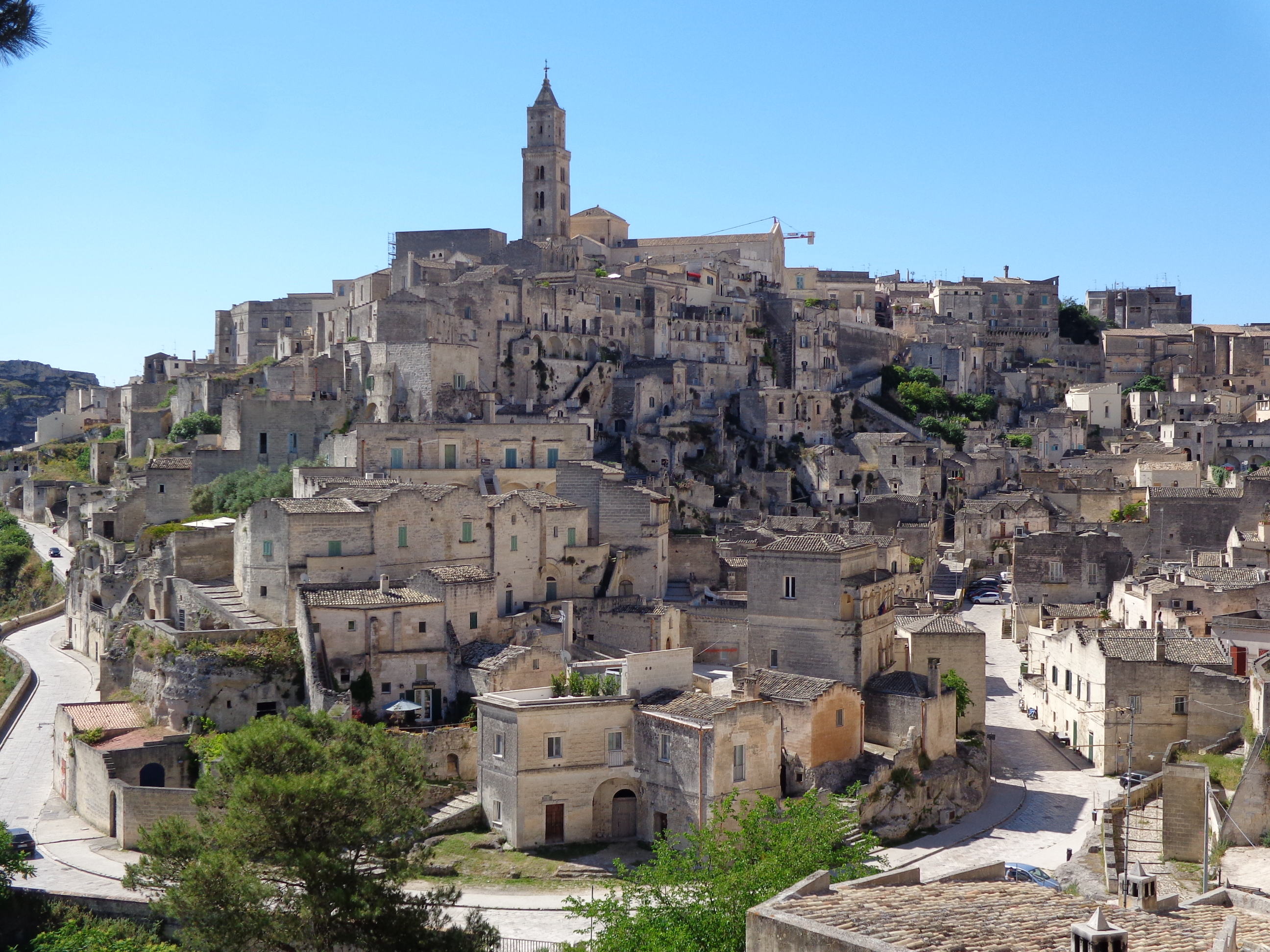
Sassi di Matera

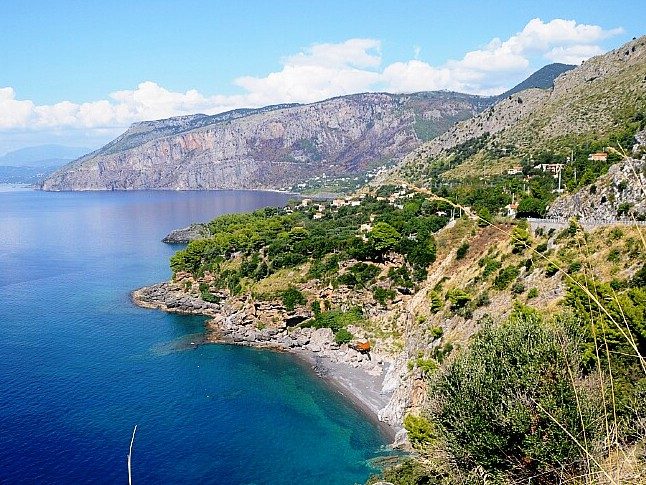
Maratea

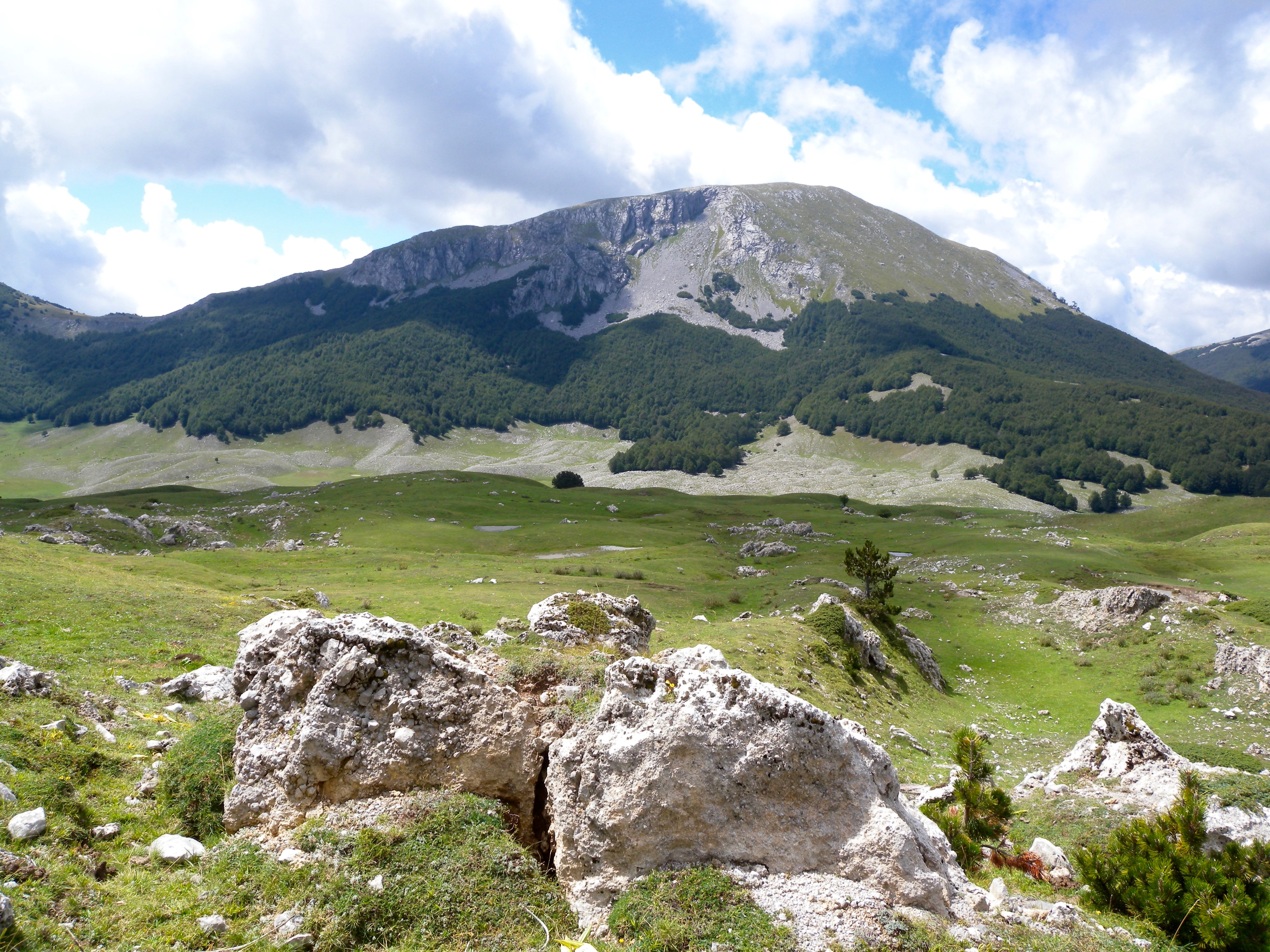
Pollino

=== Archeological sites ===
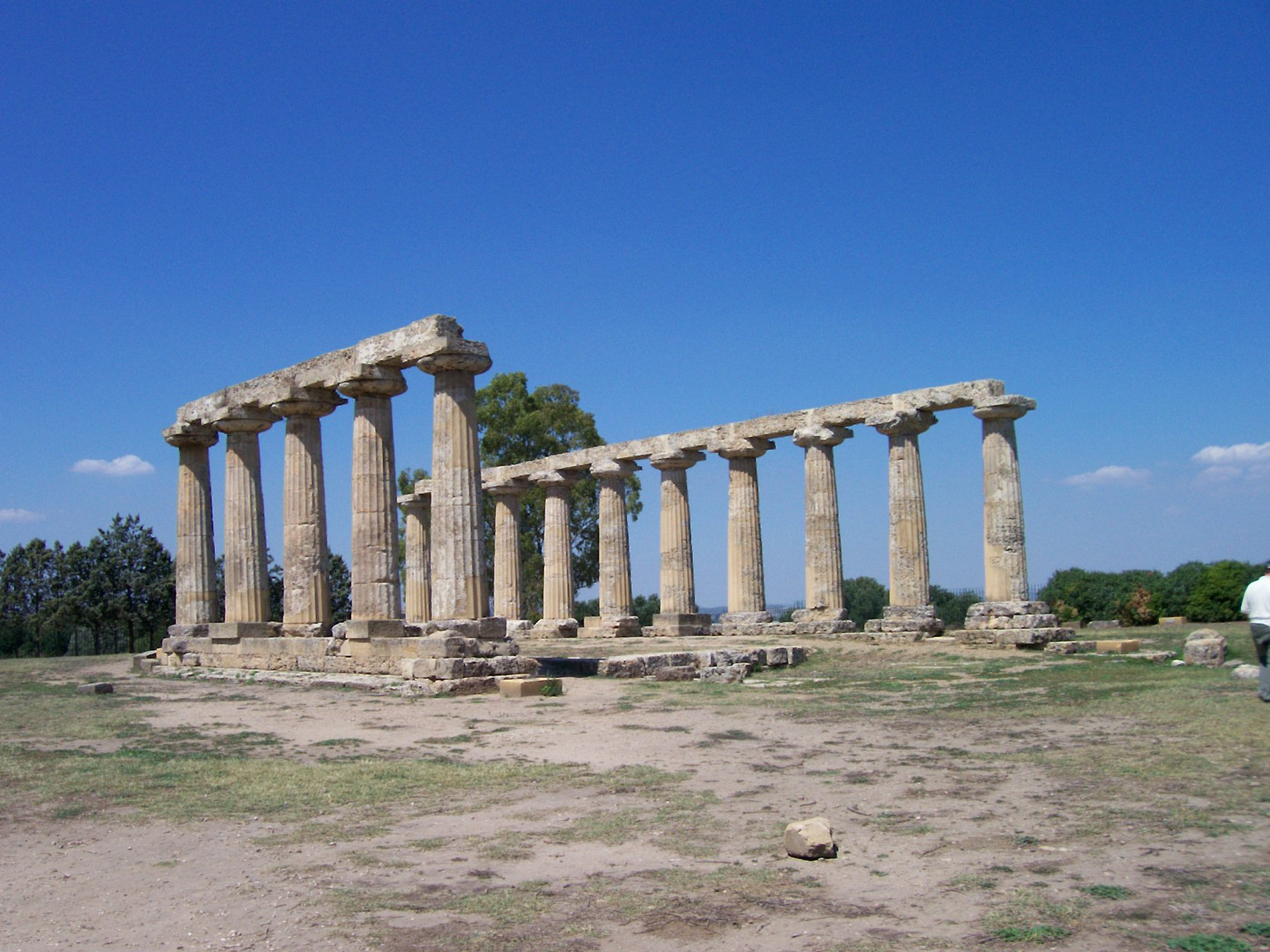
Tavole Palatine, Metaponto

Basilicata has a variety of archeological sites containing traces of Prehistoric, Greek, Roman, and Jewish heritage:

- Civita, Tricarico
- Grumentum
- Heraclea
- Metapontum
- Jewish catacombs of Venosa
- Notarchirico
- Petre de la Mola
- Serra di Vaglio
- Venusia

=== Religious buildings ===
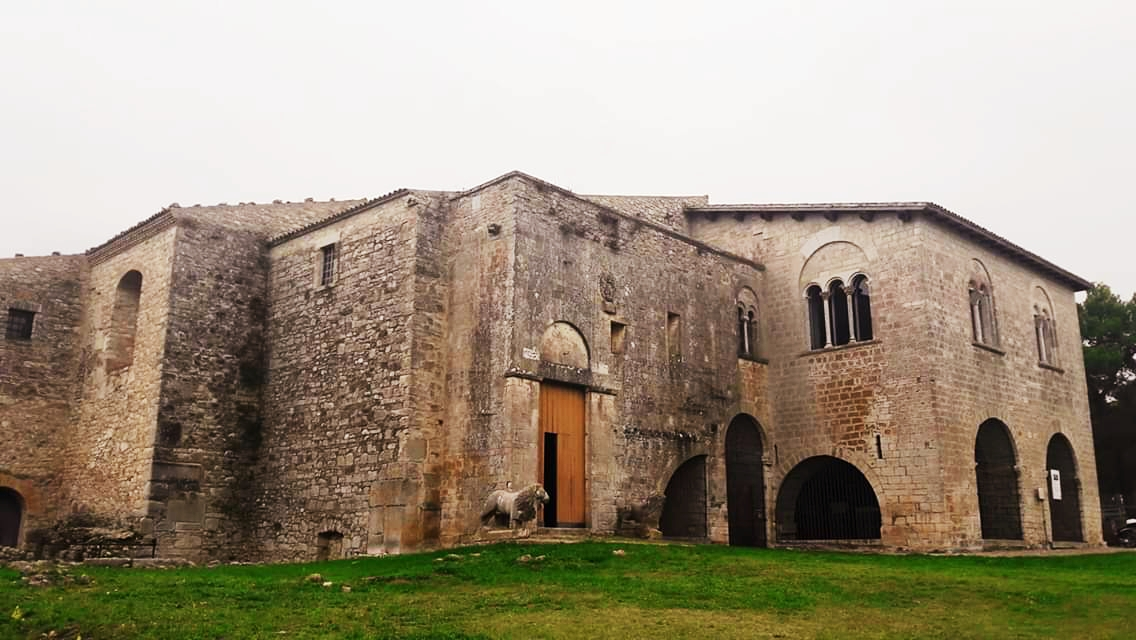
Abbey of Santissima Trinità

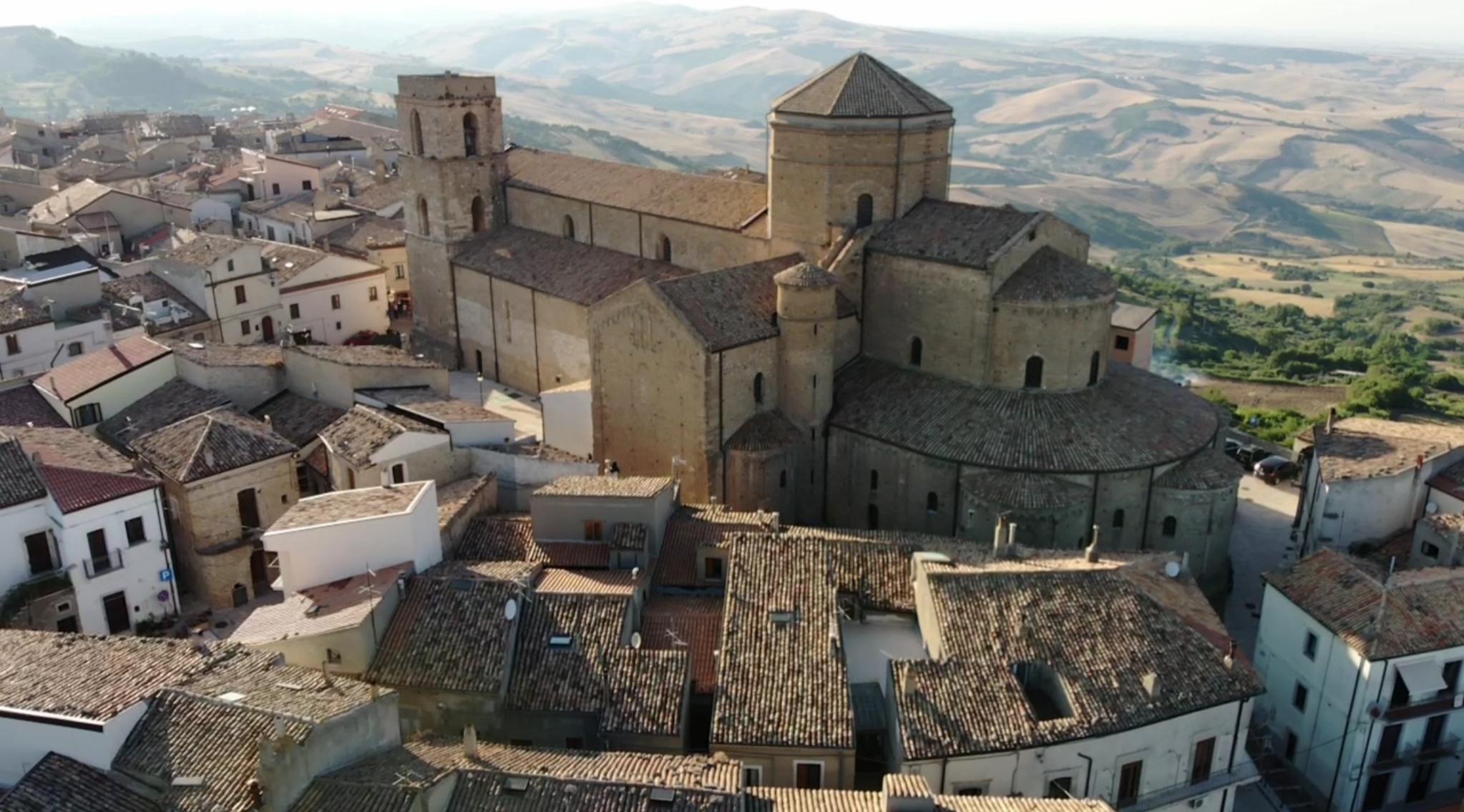
Acerenza Cathedral

Basilicata hosts a series of religious structures. The Abbey of Santissima Trinità, Venosa, is one of the most representative, which includes marks of Roman, early Christian, Romanesque, Lombard, and Norman origin. It was chosen by Robert Guiscard as the Hauteville family's burial (and he himself will be later buried there too). Other relevant religious buildings are:

- Acerenza Cathedral
- Irsina Cathedral
- Matera Cathedral
- Melfi Cathedral
- Pierno Abbey, San Fele
- Potenza Cathedral
- Rapolla Cathedral
- San Michele Abbey, Monticchio
- San Pietro Caveoso Church, Matera
- Sanctuary of Anglona, Tursi
- Tricarico Cathedral
- Venosa Cathedral

=== Castles ===
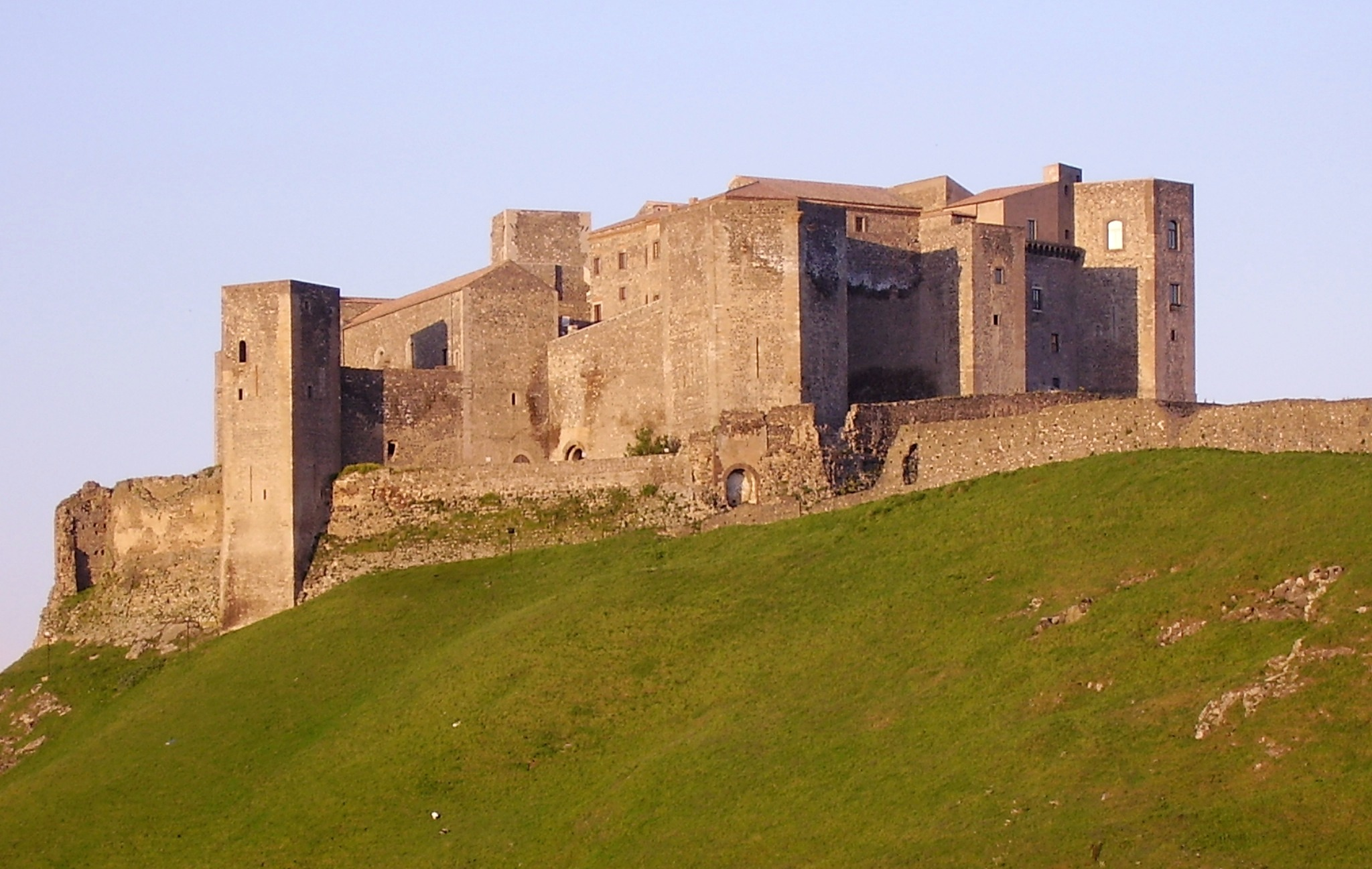
Melfi castle

Of many castles that existed in the region, mostly isolated towers and ruins have survived. The Melfi castle is perhaps the most iconic, where important events from the Middle Age took place, such as the five councils between the Normans and the Catholic Church and the constitutions of Melfi promulgated by Frederick II. The Malconsiglio castle, Miglionico, hosted the conspiracy of the Barons against Ferrante of Aragon. Among the other best preserved castles of the region are:

- Bernalda castle
- Lagopesole castle
- Laurenzana Castle
- Muro Lucano castle
- Tramontano Castle
- Venosa castle

=== Other sights ===
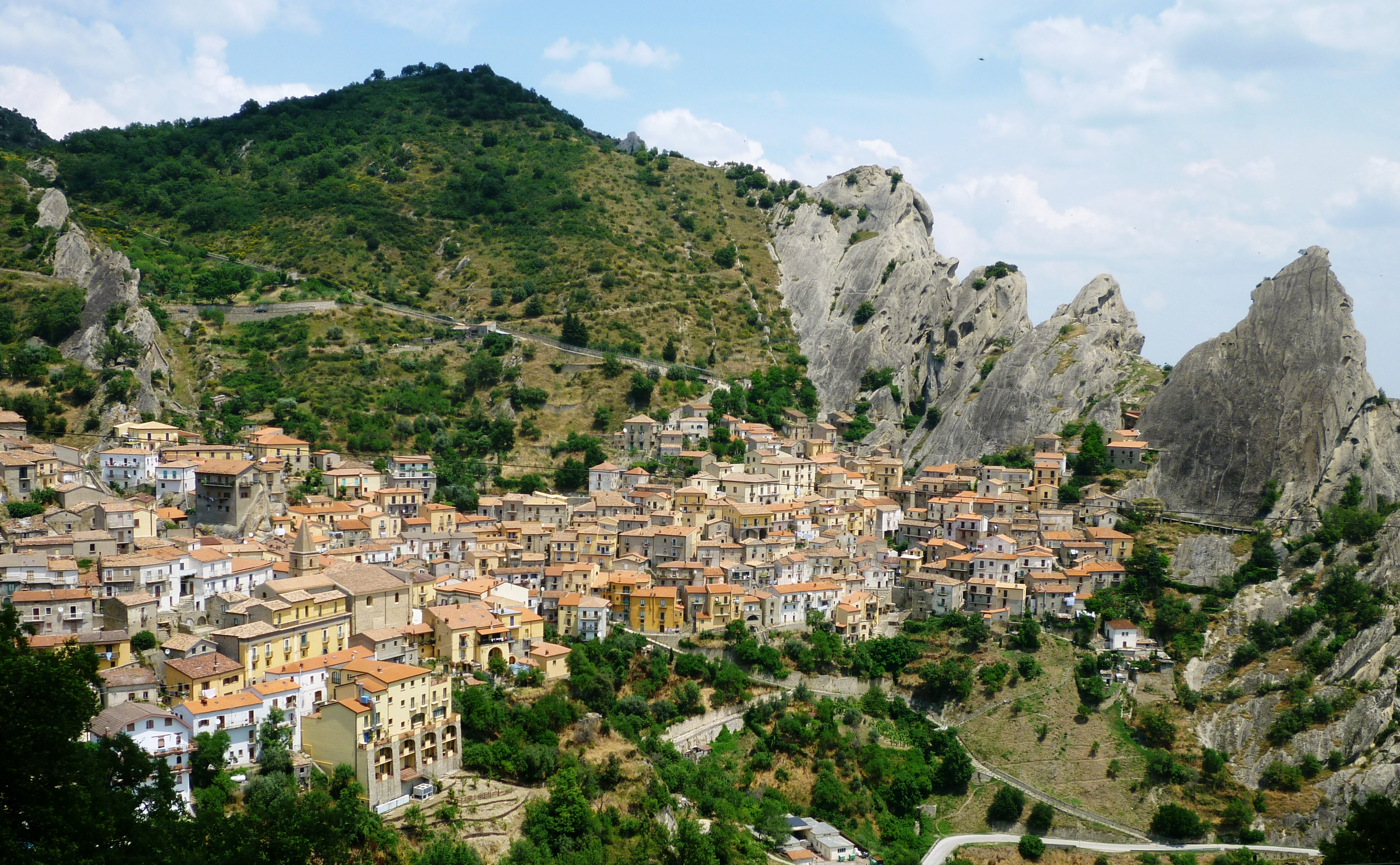
Castelmezzano

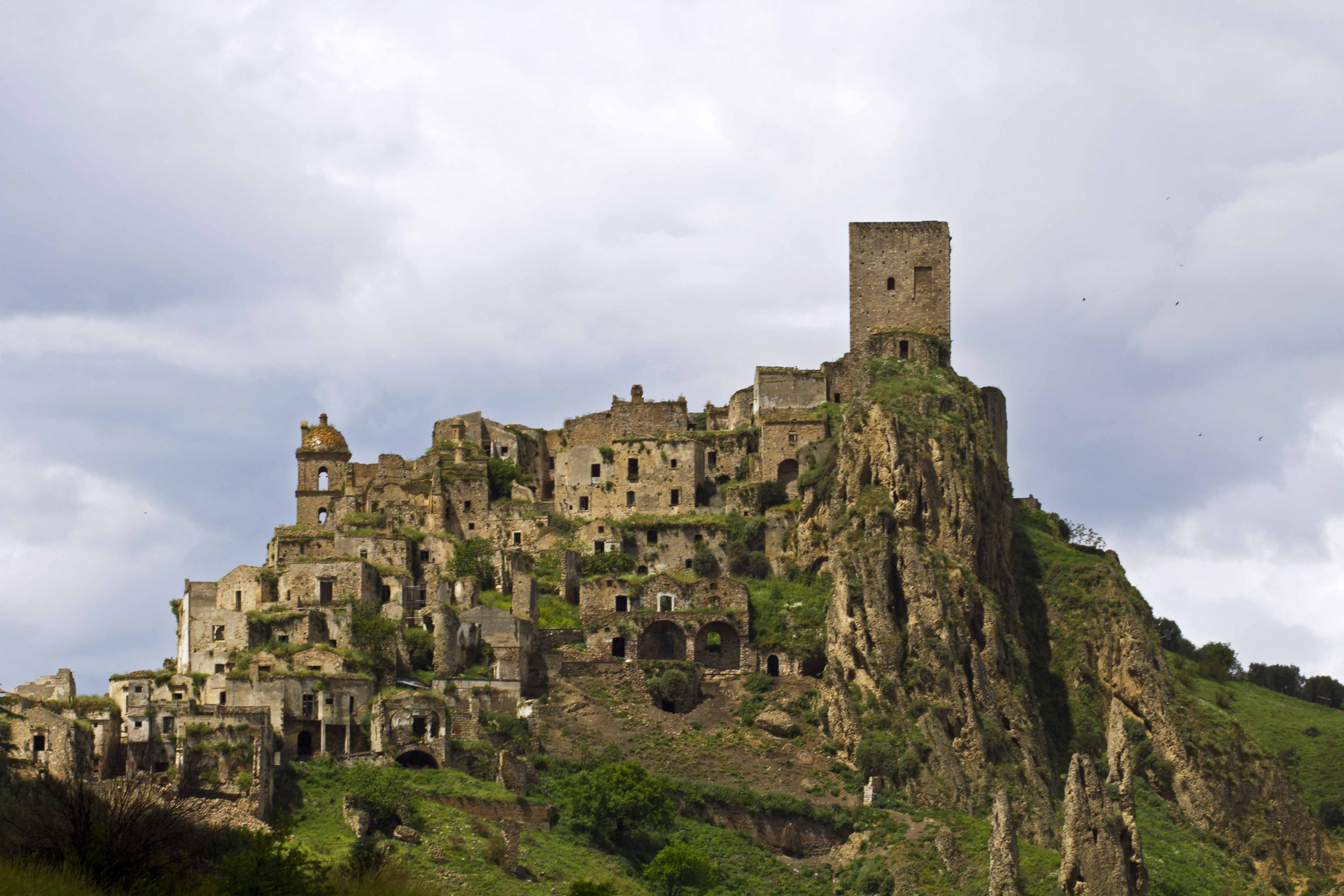
Craco

Basilicata has many small and picturesque villages, nine of them have been selected by I Borghi più belli d'Italia (English: The most beautiful Villages of Italy), a non-profit private association of small Italian towns of strong historical and artistic interest, that was founded on the initiative of the Tourism Council of the National Association of Italian Municipalities; however, they face depopulation problems, while others such as Craco and Campomaggiore saw their old sites abandoned due to natural disasters. Nonetheless, filmmakers, writers, and musicians contributed to give a boost to the rebirth of Craco, making it one of the most popular ghost towns in the world. Other historical and distinctive villages are:

- Accettura
- Acerenza
- Aliano
- Castelmezzano
- Guardia Perticara
- Pietrapertosa
- Rivello
- Rotondella
- Satriano di Lucania
- Valsinni
- Viggianello

== Culture ==
=== Art ===
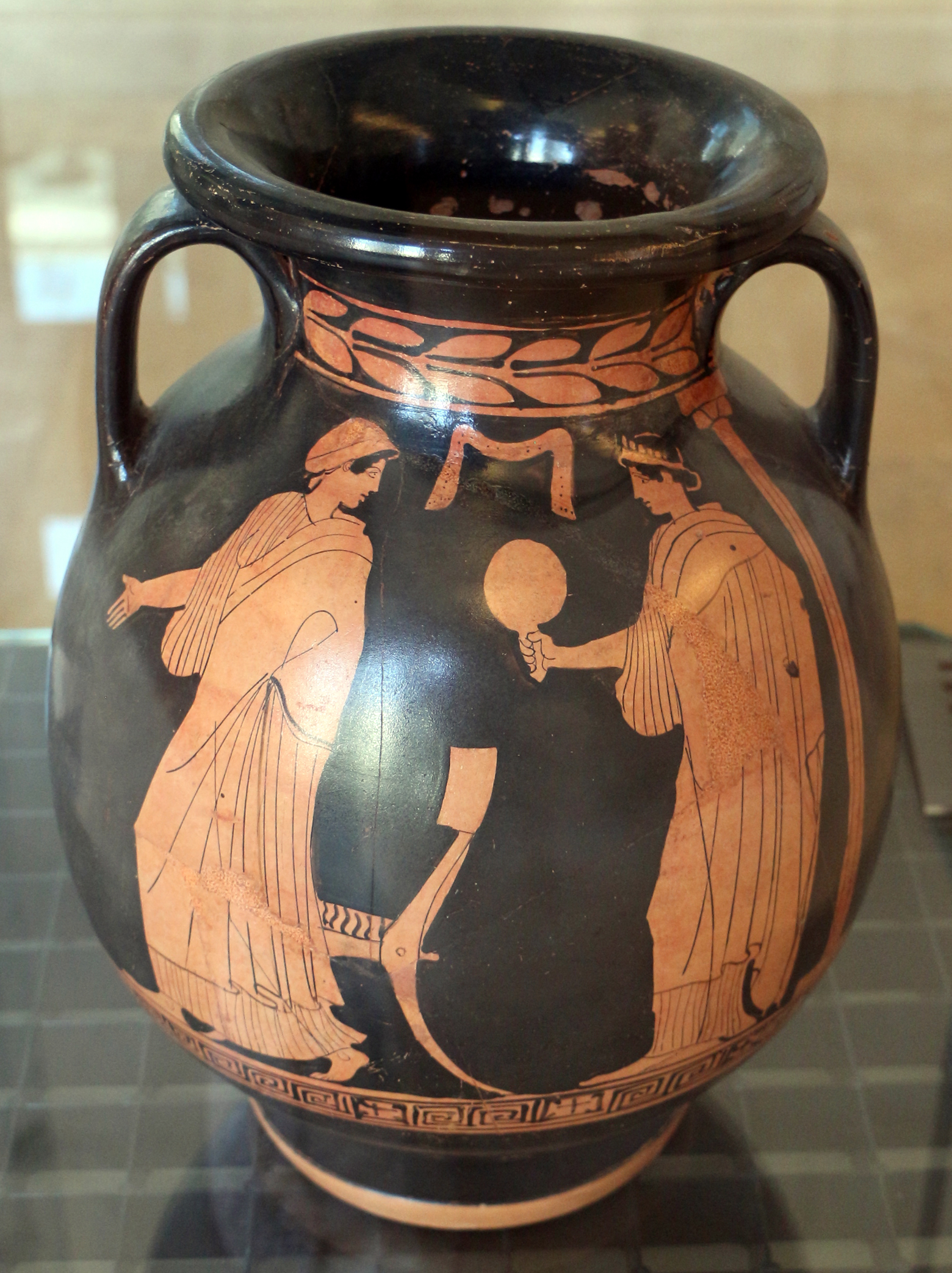
Lucanian red-figure pelike by the Pisticci Painter, c. 430 BC, Archaeological Museum "Domenico Ridola", Matera

Cave paintings were found in the Tuppo dei Sassi site (or Ranaldi shelter, after its discoverer Francesco Ranaldi, archaeologist and museum director), a prehistoric site in the Filiano territory, considered the oldest artistic trace in Basilicata. During the Greek colonisation era, artists like the Pisticci Painter and the Amykos Painter operated in the area of Metaponto around the 5th century BC. Metaponto is one of the largest and earliest Greek centres of vase painting in Italy; the Lucanian vase painting began around 430 BC, with the works of the Pisticci Painter. In the Armento area, the Kritonios Crown and the Armento Rider were found and are exposed in Munich and London, respectively.

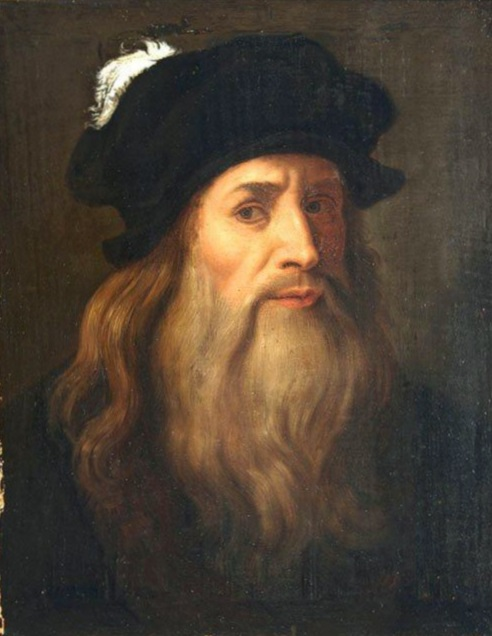
Lucan portrait of Leonardo da Vinci, Museo delle Antiche Genti di Lucania, Vaglio

The Jewish catacombs of Venosa are cited among the most significant signs of the Jewish presence in southern Italy. Around the 7th century, basilian monks settled in Basilicata, leaving a high concentration of rupestrian churches (155 ascertained into the 21st century), in Matera, Pollino and the Agri and Sinni Valleys. Frescoes from the Angevin period can be found in the Abbey of the Santissima Trinità of Venosa, the Rupestrian churches of St. Mary of the Valley in Matera, St. Antonio in Oppido Lucano, St. Lucia in Rapolla, and St. Margherita in Melfi.

The stone Nativity scene by Altobello Persio (1534) in the Matera Cathedral is an early example of Renaissance art in the region. Later Basilicata saw the imported and imitated art phenomenon with artists such as Giovanni Bellini and Cima da Conegliano, and Flemish painting by Dirck Hendricksz, Guglielmo Borremans, and Aert Mijtens, among the others. Local painters such as Giovanni De Gregorio, Andrea Miglionico and Carlo Sellitto had a Neapolitan school background. An alleged portrait of Leonardo da Vinci, dating back to the 1500s, was discovered in 2008, today exhibited in the Museo delle Antiche genti di Lucania, Vaglio.

Some artists from the 19th century include Vincenzo Marinelli, Giacomo Di Chirico and Michele Tedesco. Several contemporary artists gained fame outside Italy, among them are worth to mention Marino Di Teana, Eugenio Santoro, Beniamino Bufano and Joseph Stella, sometimes cited as the first futurist painter in America. During his exile under the Italian fascist regime, Carlo Levi (1902–1975) was assigned to Aliano, a village above the Calanchi clay ravines of the Agri valley interior, where he practiced medicine informally and documented peasant life through painting and writing. His memoir Christ Stopped at Eboli (1945), written from memory while in hiding in Florence in 1943–44, became one of the most significant works of Italian literature of the 20th century and introduced Basilicata to international readers. The title derives from a phrase heard among the peasants of Aliano, that modernity, Christianity, and the Italian state had never reached beyond Eboli, on the plain south of Naples. Levi requested burial in Aliano, where his tomb stands at the edge of the Calanchi facing the landscape he documented during his exile. Many of his paintings from this period are exhibited in Matera.

=== Music ===
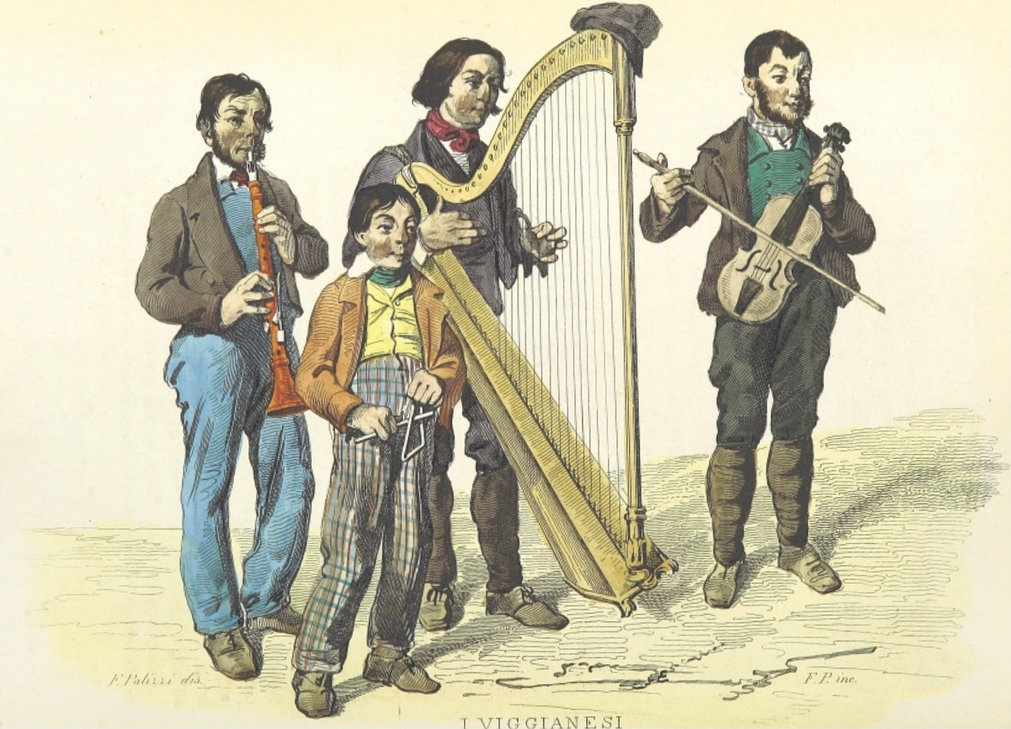
I Viggianesi, by Filippo Palizzi, 1853

Although Basilicata hosted classical composers such as Carlo Gesualdo and Egidio Romualdo Duni, the region is primarily identified in popular music, which reflects the humble living conditions of its inhabitants. The arpa viggianese (commonly known as arpicedda) is a typical harp from Viggiano of average size, with a thin and light structure that makes it easier to carry; it was the distinctive instrument of street musicians from the Val d'Agri area in the past centuries, who wandered around the world and many of whom were admitted to symphony orchestras. Viggiano is remembered as the "City of Harp and Music". Other traditional instruments are cupa cupa, zampogna, and ciaramella.

During the emigration wave of the late 19th century, some composers gained recognition in North America: Leonardo De Lorenzo, flautist of several American philharmonic orchestras and professor at the Eastman School of Music, regarded as one of the most eminent flute pedagogues of the 1900s; Carlo Curti, who helped to popularize the mandolin in the United States and Mexico, and founder of the Orquestra Típica Mexicana, considered the "predecessor of the Mariachi bands". Comedy duo Lyons and Yosco became popular for their million-selling ragtime piece "Spaghetti Rag".

Antonio Infantino was instrumental in rediscovering, reinventing, and bringing tarantella to modern audiences, as well as pioneering world music in Italy. Pino Mango was the first modern pop artist from the region to achieve success in the Italian music scene. Arisa won both the "Newcomer" and the "Big Artist" section at the 2009 and the 2014 editions of the Sanremo Music Festival, respectively. Mango's daughter Angelina also won the 2024 Sanremo Music Festival and was ranked 7th in the 2024 Eurovision Song Contest. For nearly 30 years, Basilicata hosted the Agglutination Metal Festival, one of Europe's longest-running heavy metal events.

=== Cinema ===
Since the post–World War II era, Basilicata has become a set for many national and international film productions. Matera is the most coveted film location, especially for biblical-themed movies, being often compared with the ancient Jerusalem. Other locations include the ghost town of Craco, Melfi and Maratea. The region hosted, among the others, the filming of The Demon (1963), The Gospel According to St. Matthew (1964), Christ Stopped at Eboli (1979), I'm Not Scared (2003), The Passion of the Christ (2004), The Omen (2006), Quantum of Solace (2008), Wonder Woman (2017), and No Time to Die (2021).

Some actors and film directors are from Basilicata, most notably Robert G. Vignola, a prominent figure of the silent era, as well as Pasquale Festa Campanile, associated with the commedia all'italiana genre, and Ruggero Deodato, known for his horror films such as the controversial Cannibal Holocaust (1980). Tanio Boccia, Rocco Papaleo, Antonio Gerardi, Antonio Petrocelli, and Alessandra Di Sanzo are other notable personalities in the Italian movie industry.

=== Cuisine ===
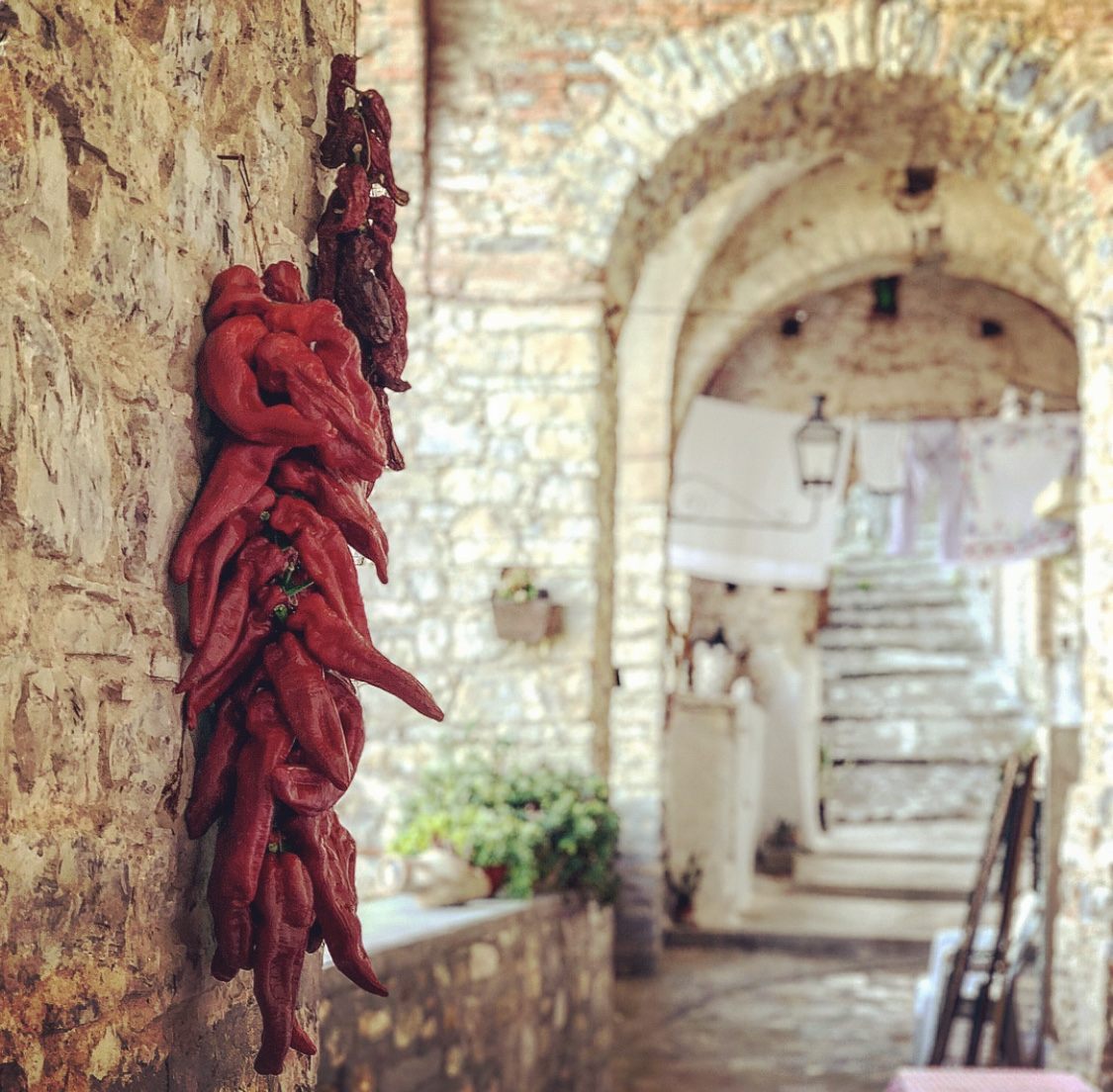
Peperone crusco, a staple of the cuisine of Basilicata

The local cuisine is mostly based on pork and sheep meat, legumes, cereals, vegetables, and tubers. It is commonly referred to as cucina povera (Italian for 'cuisine of the poor'), deeply anchored in peasant traditions. Bread crumb is considered a poor-man's cheese substitute, sprinkled over pasta dishes and used as a seasoning for meat and vegetables. Horseradish is often used as a spice and condiment, which is referred to as "poor man's truffle". The peperone crusco (PAT) is a specialty of the regional cuisine, sometimes labeled as "the red gold of Basilicata". It is the dried form of the peperone di Senise (PGI), one of the most popular Italian pepper varieties. Traditional recipes include pasta dishes like pasta con i peperoni cruschi and tumact me tulez, and main courses such as rafanata and acquasale. Pastizz and falagone are also common street foods.

Basilicata is best known for the salsiccia Lucanica di Picerno (PGI) pork sausage that derives from lucanica, an ancient recipe originated before the Roman empire. Pane di Matera (PGI) is a type of bread recognizable for its intense flavour and conical shape, as well as long preservation. Other principal products are cheeses like pecorino di Filiano (PDO), canestrato di Moliterno (PGI), padraccio (PAT), and treccia dura (PAT); vegetables like melanzana rossa di Rotonda (PDO); and legumes like fagiolo di Sarconi (PGI) and fagiolo bianco di Rotonda (PDO). The region is also known for its naturally sparkling mineral water that springs from the streams of Mount Vulture. Alcoholic beverages include Aglianico del Vulture, which is considered one of Italy's top red wines, and Amaro Lucano liqueur.
