= Giannetti =

Giannetti is a surname. Notable people with the surname include:

- Alfredo Giannetti (1924–1995), Italian screenwriter and film editor
- Alyssa Giannetti (born 1994), American footballer
- Eduardo Giannetti da Fonseca (born 1957), Brazilian economist and author
- Filippo Giannetti or Giannetto (1630–1702), Italian painter
- John A. Giannetti Jr. (born 1964), American politician
- Niccolò Giannetti (born 1991), Italian footballer

== See also ==
- Gianetti

n
