= Monti Li Foj =

Mountain in Italy

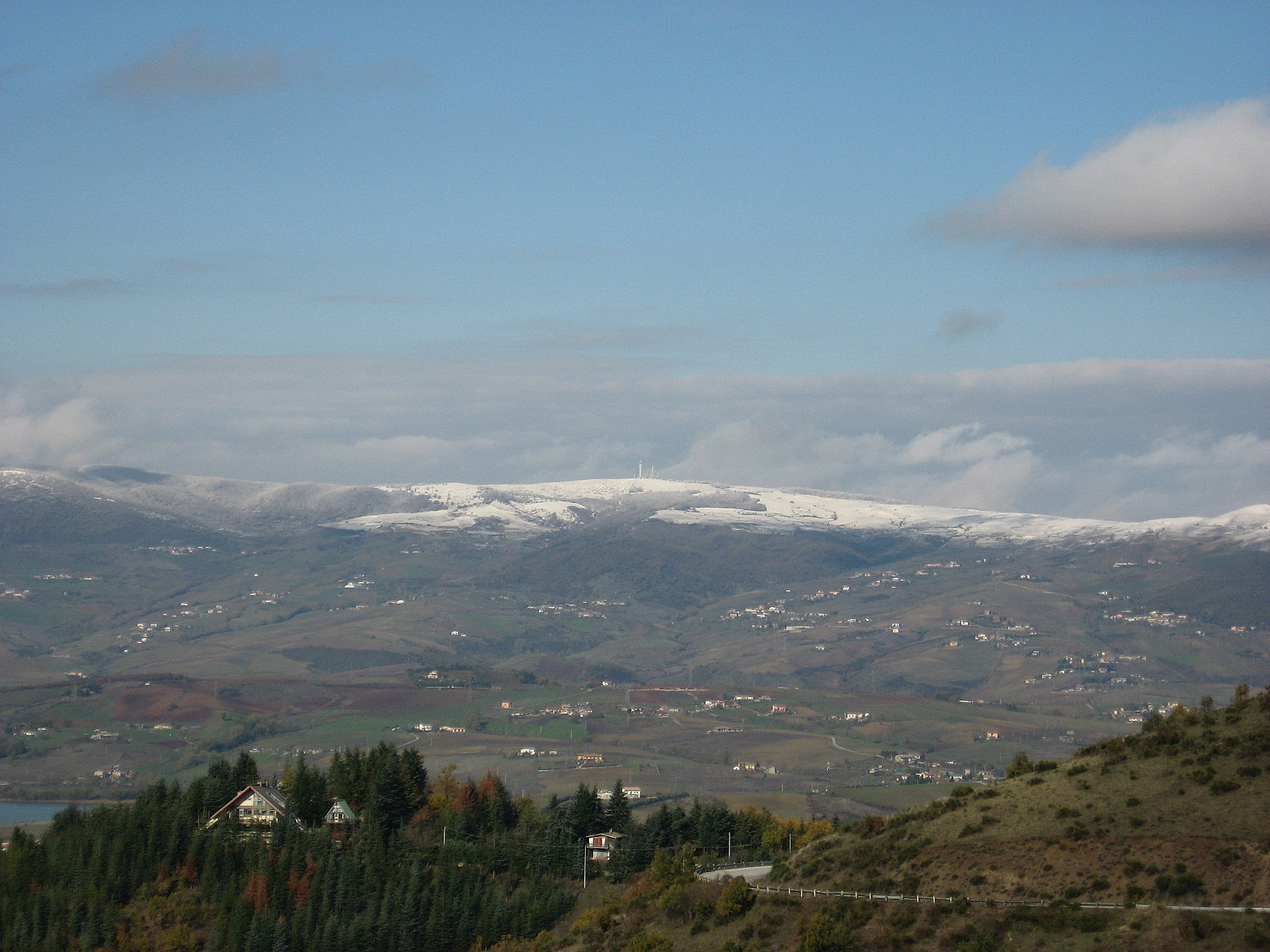

Highest point
- Elevation: 1,367 m (4,485 ft)
- Coordinates: 40°39′04″N 15°42′31″E

Geography
- Location within Italy
- Location: Basilicata, Italy
- Parent range: Southern Apennines

Monti Li Foj is a mountain of Basilicata, southern Italy.
