= Andrea Miglionico =

Italian painter

Andrea Miglionico (30 November 1662 – 1711) was an Italian painter of the late-Baroque period.

He was born in Miglionico in the province of Matera of Basilicata, then part of the Kingdom of Naples, and a pupil of Luca Giordano.

He painted a number of canvases in collaboration with the landscape artist Filippo Giannetti. He also painted a series of canvases for the church of San Michele a Sant'Andrea di Conza in Irpina, commissioned by the bishop of Conza, Gaetano Caracciolo. The depict the following subjects:

- Apparition of the Archangel Michael to San Lorenzo Maiorano sul monte Gargano
- Apparition of the Archangel Michael to Tobias
- Liberation of St Peter from Jail
- St John the Evangelist in Patmos
- Annunciation to Zacharias
- Birth of the Virgin

He painted in 1695 the two ceiling canvases depicting St Peter of Alcantara and the Battle of Belgrade for the Chiesa della Santissima Trinità presso Baronissi in the province of Salerno.

In his native city, the best, perhaps, a 'Pentecost’’' in the Santissima Nunziata. He painted an Apotheosis of Saint Teresa (1710) for the Confraternity della Gran Madre di Dio, and placed in the church of Santa Teresa dei Maschi in Bari. He died in Ginosa.
