= Toppa Pizzuta =

Mountain in Italy

Highest point
- Elevation: 770 m (2,530 ft)

Geography
- Location: Basilicata, Italy
- Parent range: Southern Apennines

Toppa Pizzuta is a mountain of Basilicata, Italy.

East of this mountain lies the exclave of Tricarico.
