= Gianetti =

Gianetti is a surname. Notable people with the surname include:

- Gianetti Bonfim (born 1965), Brazilian racewalker
- Gustavo Gianetti (born 1979), Brazilian model
- Lautaro Gianetti (born 1993), Argentine footballer
- Marty Gianetti (born Fredrick Martin Jannetty in 1960), American professional wrestler
- Mauro Gianetti (born 1964), Swiss bicycle racer
- Noé Gianetti (born 1989), Swiss cyclist

== See also ==
- Giannetti
