= Monte Carmine =

Mountain in Italy

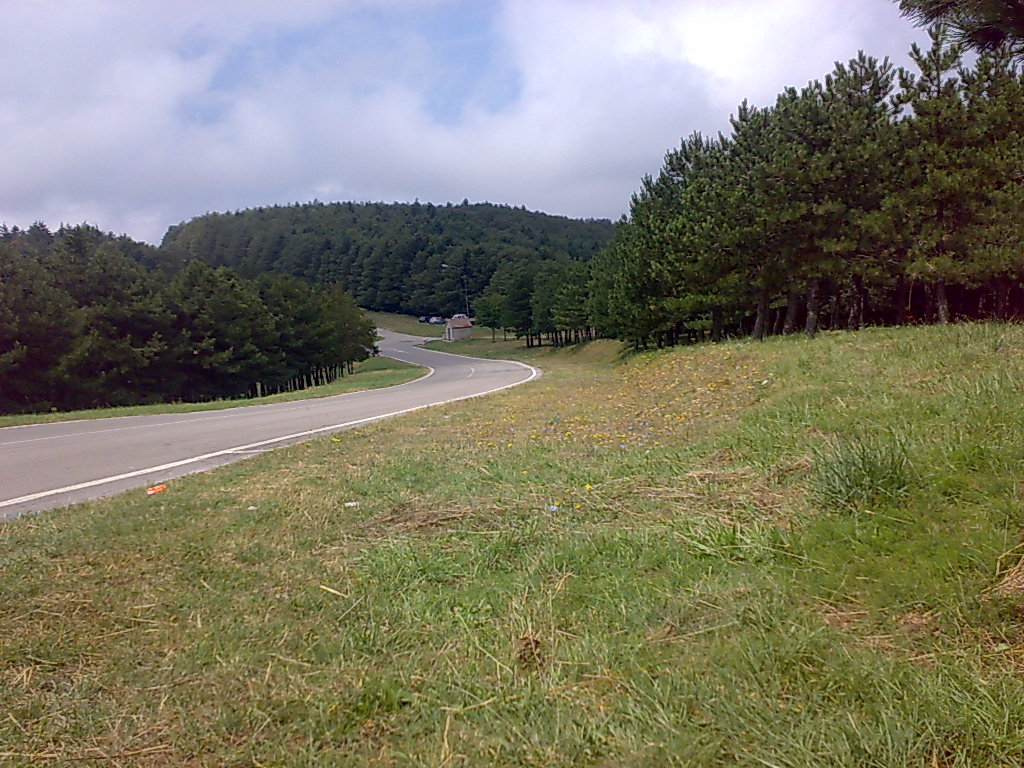
- Around the Sanctuary

Highest point
- Elevation: 1,228 m (4,029 ft)
- Coordinates: 40°45′40″N 15°44′47″E

Geography
- Location within Italy
- Location: Basilicata, Italy
- Parent range: Southern Apennines

Monte Carmine is a mountain of Basilicata, southern Italy.
