= Flag of Basilicata =

- Proportion: 2:3
- Adopted: 6 April 1999
- Design: A field of azure with the coat of arms of Basilicata in the centre

The flag of Basilicata is one of the official symbols of the region of Basilicata, Italy. The current flag was adopted on 6 April 1999.

== Symbolism ==
The flag is the coat of arms of Basilicata superimposed on the a field of azure. An unofficial variant has "Regione Basilicata" above the coat of arms, a gold-bordered white shield with four blue waves, representing the four major rivers of the region: the Basento, Agri, Bradano and Sinni.

Unofficial variant
