= San Pietro Caveoso =

Catholic church in Matera, Italy

Coordinates: 40.6644°N 16.61265°E

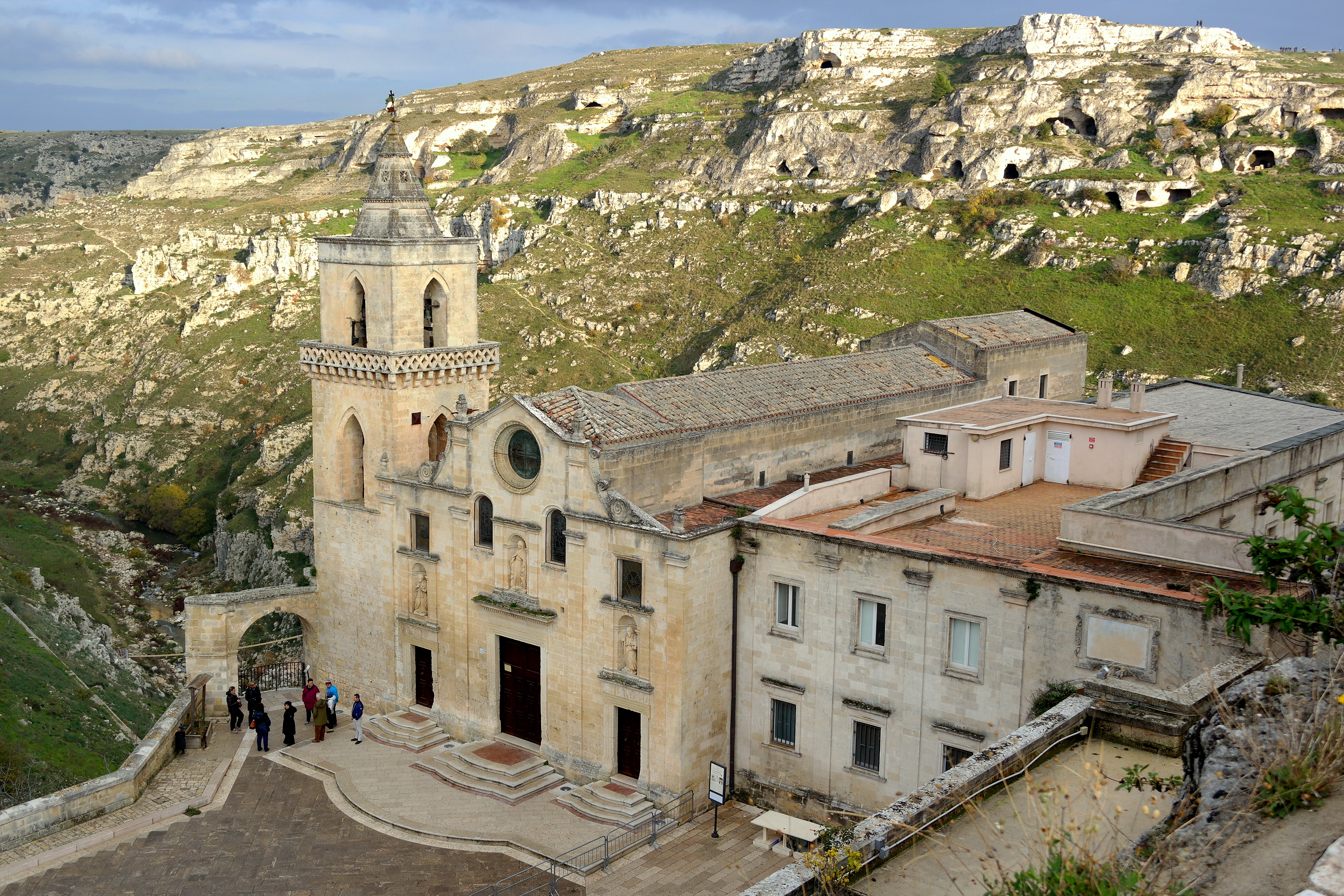

Religion
- Affiliation: Catholic Church
- Province: Basilicata
- Rite: Roman Rite
- Status: Active

Location
- Location: Matera, Basilicata Italy
- State: Italy
- Interactive map of San Pietro Caveoso

Architecture
- Type: Church
- Monument historique

San Pietro Caveoso, also known as "Saint Peter and Saint Paul Church", is a Catholic church situated in the Sassi of Matera.

The front is in the baroque style and presents three portals. Over each portal there is a niche with statues. They show the "Madonna of the mercy", "Saint Peter" (over the left portal) and "Saint Paul" (over the right portal). The side niches are surmounted by two rectangular windows and the central one by two single-lancet windows. There is a rose window and a bell tower with a pyramidal cusp on it.

The central nave ceiling is adorned with pictures of "Jesus and Saint Peter" and "Saint Paul's conversion". The 18th-century altar has a wooden polyptych dating back to 1540, painted by an anonymous artist from Matera. The church originally had eight chapels, but the right four were demolished to build the oratory. In the fourth left chapel there is a baptismal font from the 13th century. It is 17.2 m (56 ft) wide and 43 m (141 ft) long and has a deep choir.

The church has been recently consolidated, with a project about soil consolidation and general anchorage of the macro-elements of the building, and between the building and the foundation rock.

Exterior

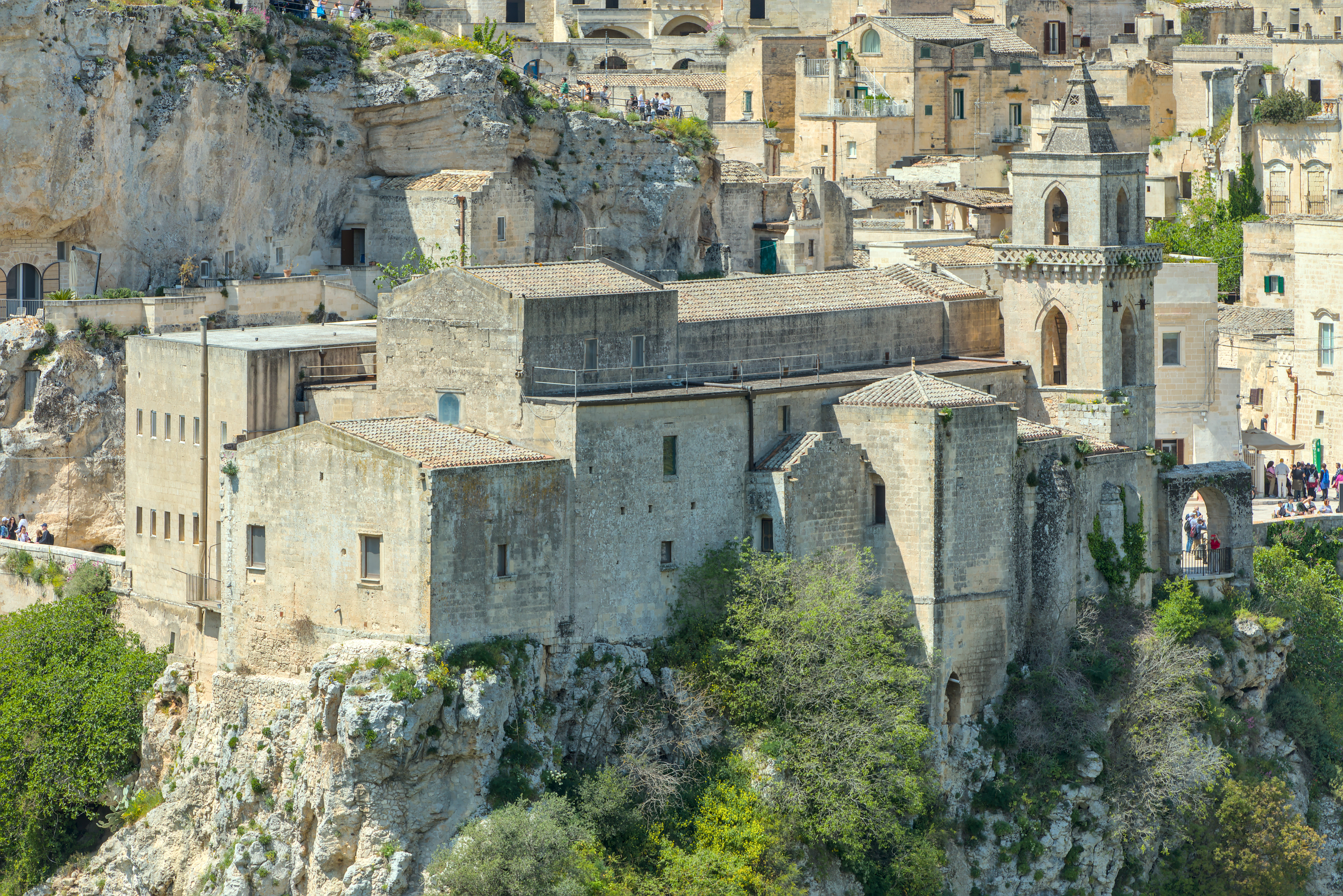
Rear view

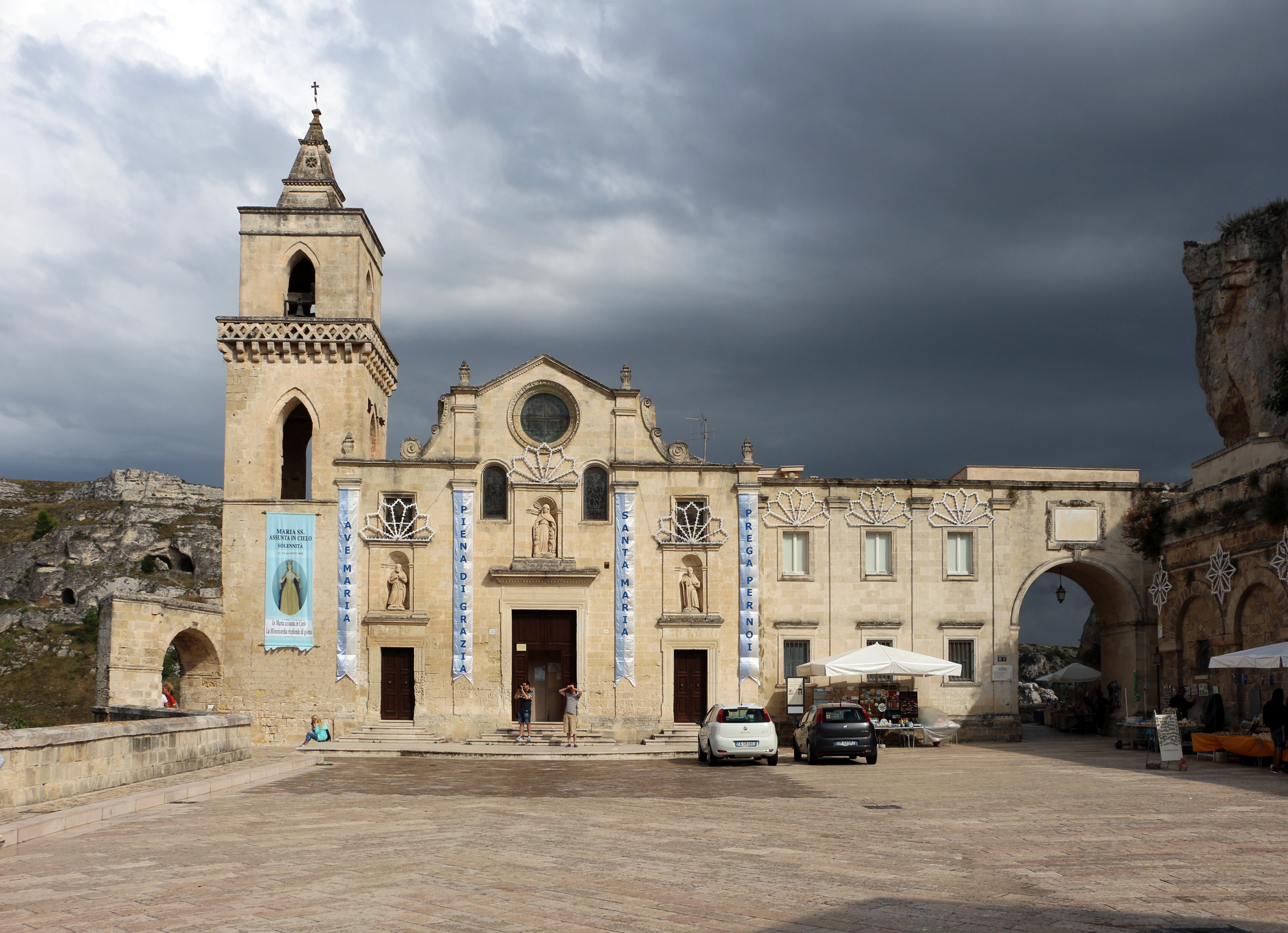
Façade and bell tower

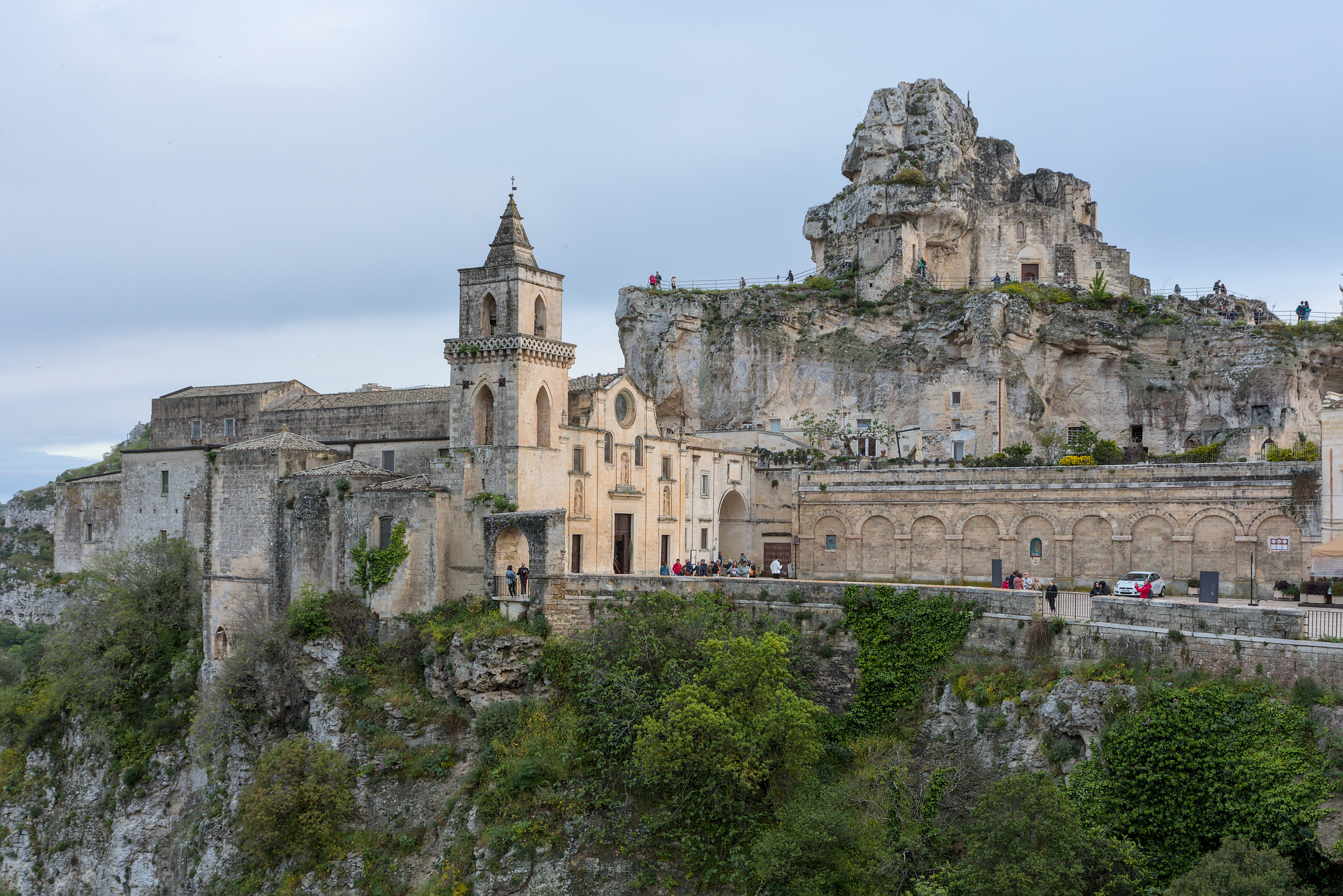
San Pietro Caveoso church and the rocky outcrop on which Madonna de Idris church is built

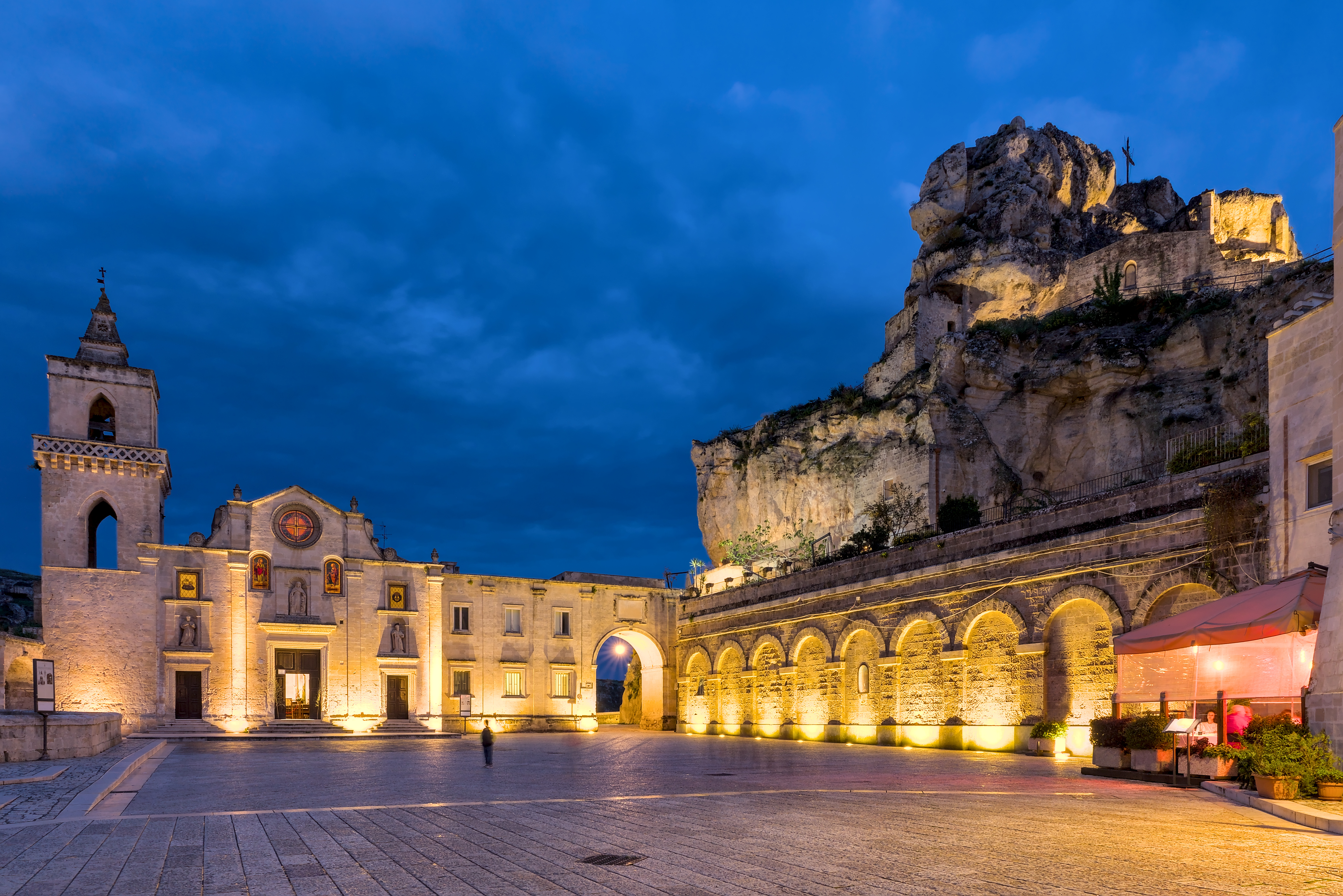
San Pietro Caveoso church and the rocky outcrop at blue hour
Interior

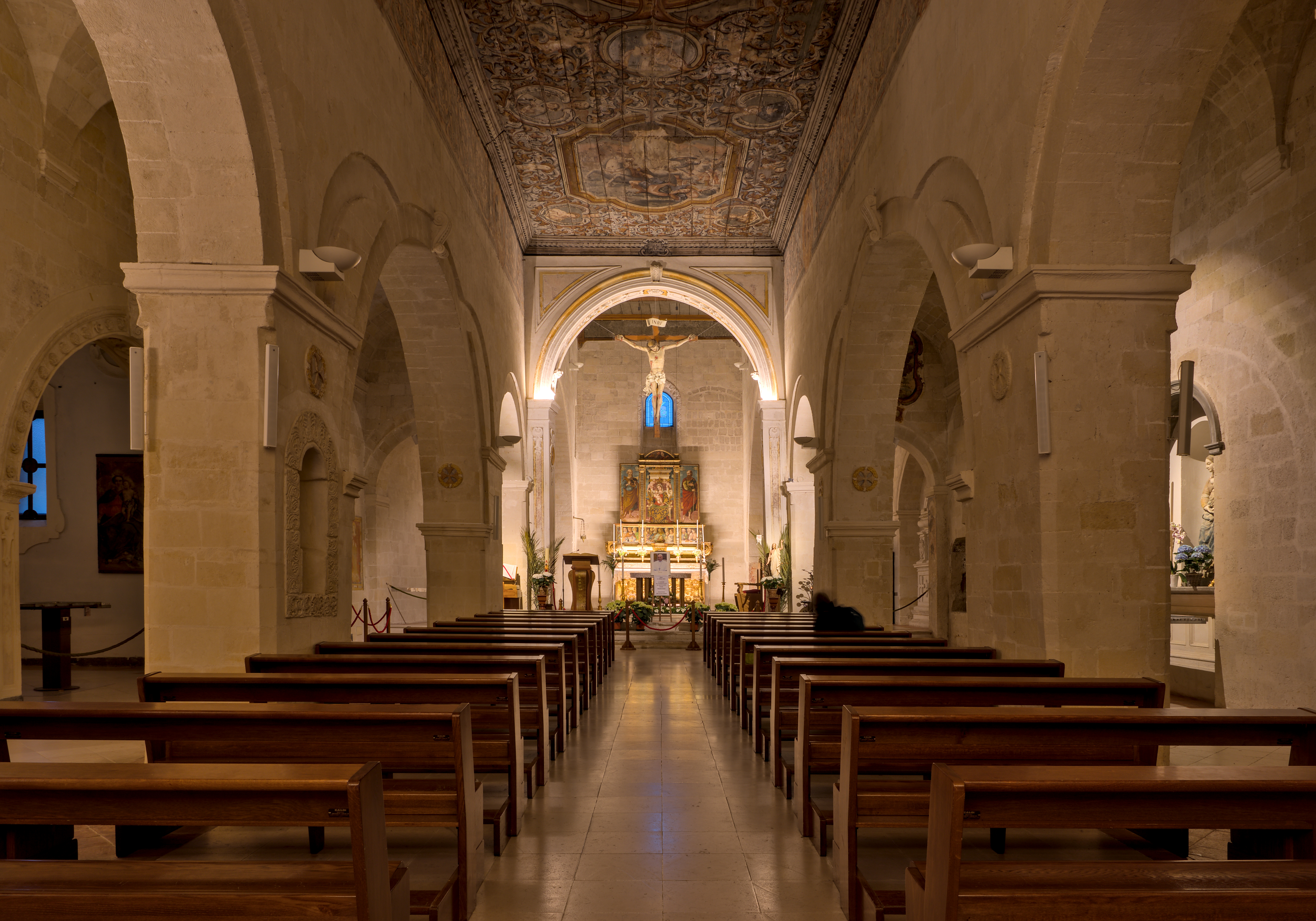
The interior

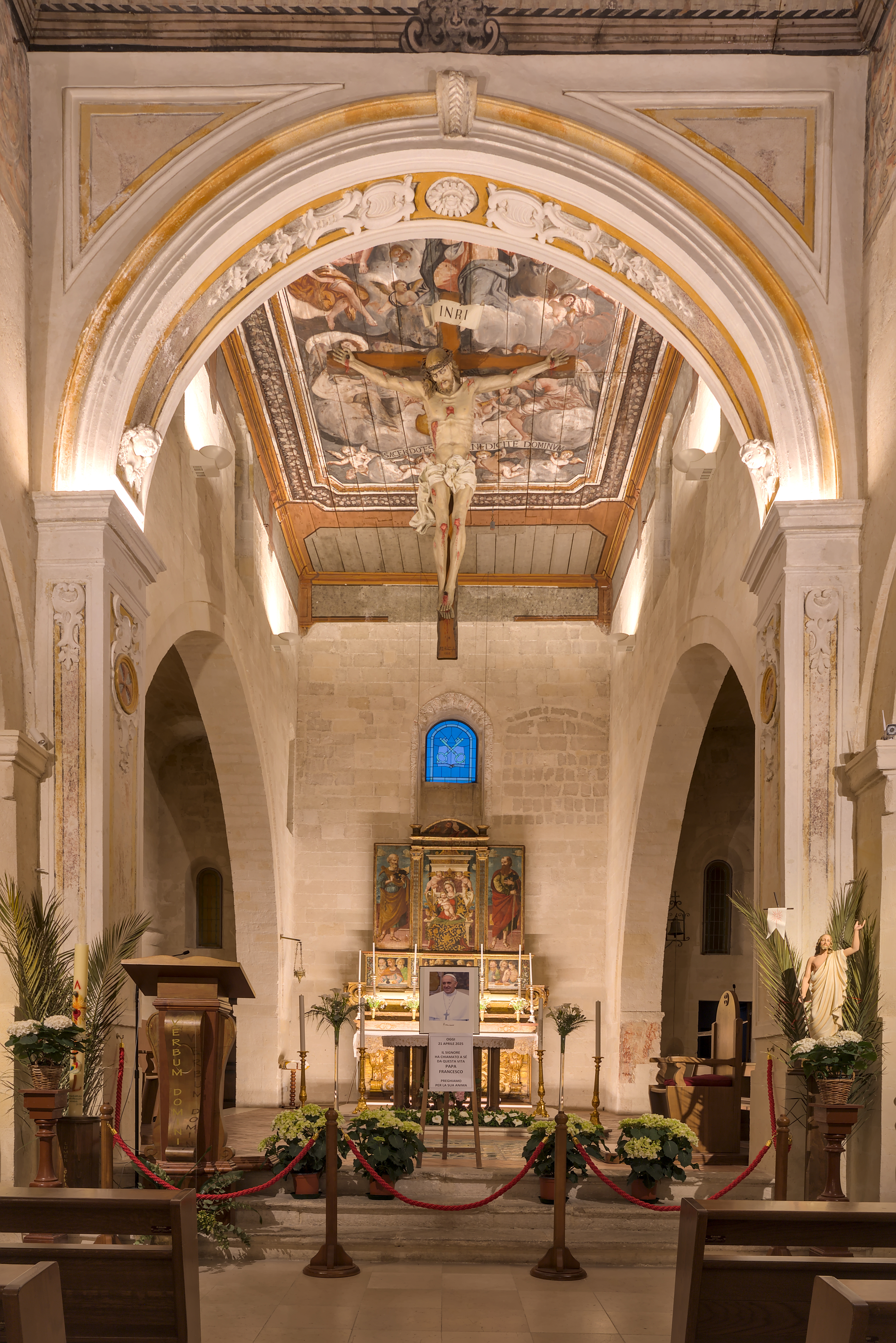
The choir

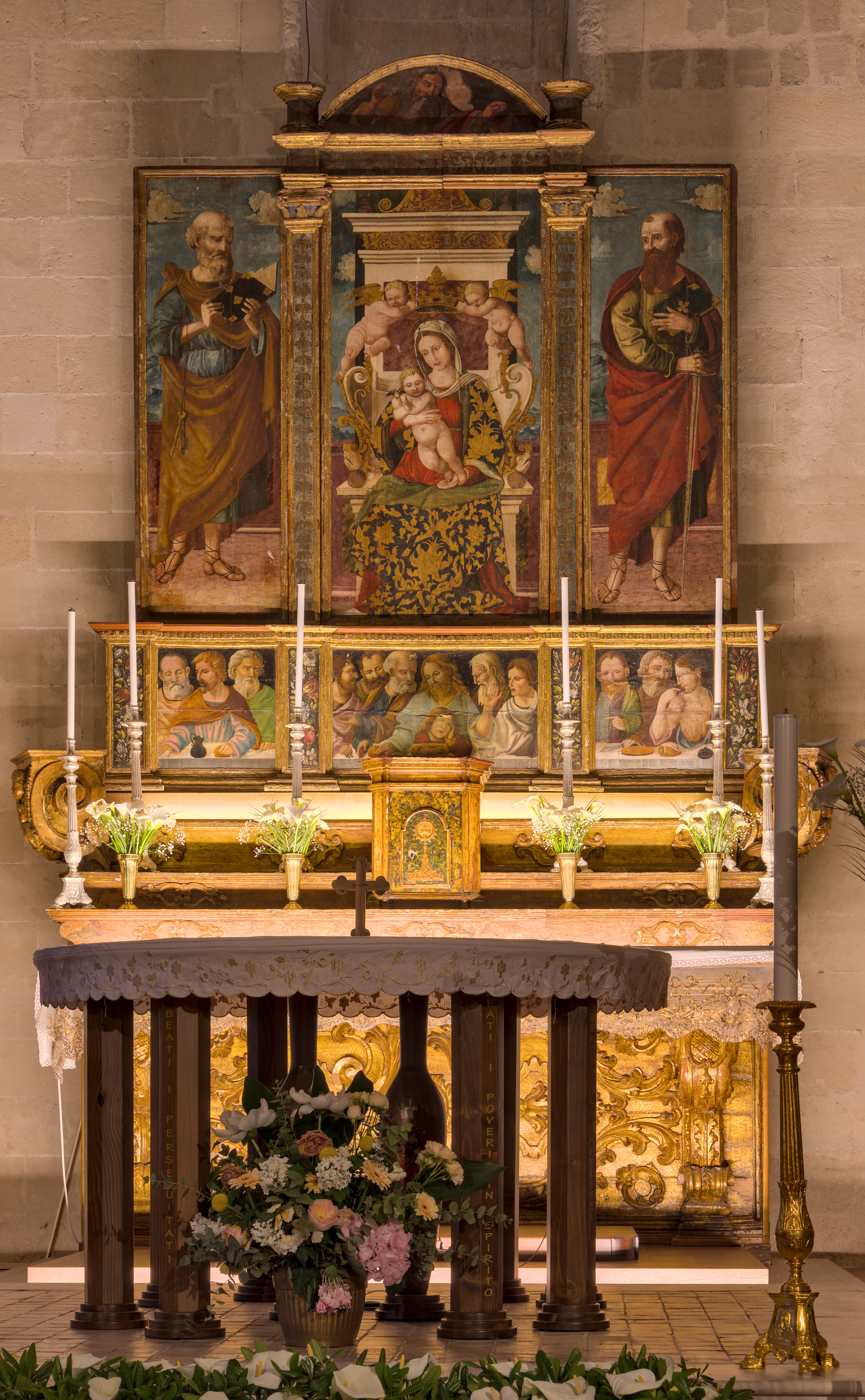
Main altar with the polyptych Madonna and Child with saints Peter and Paul (1540)

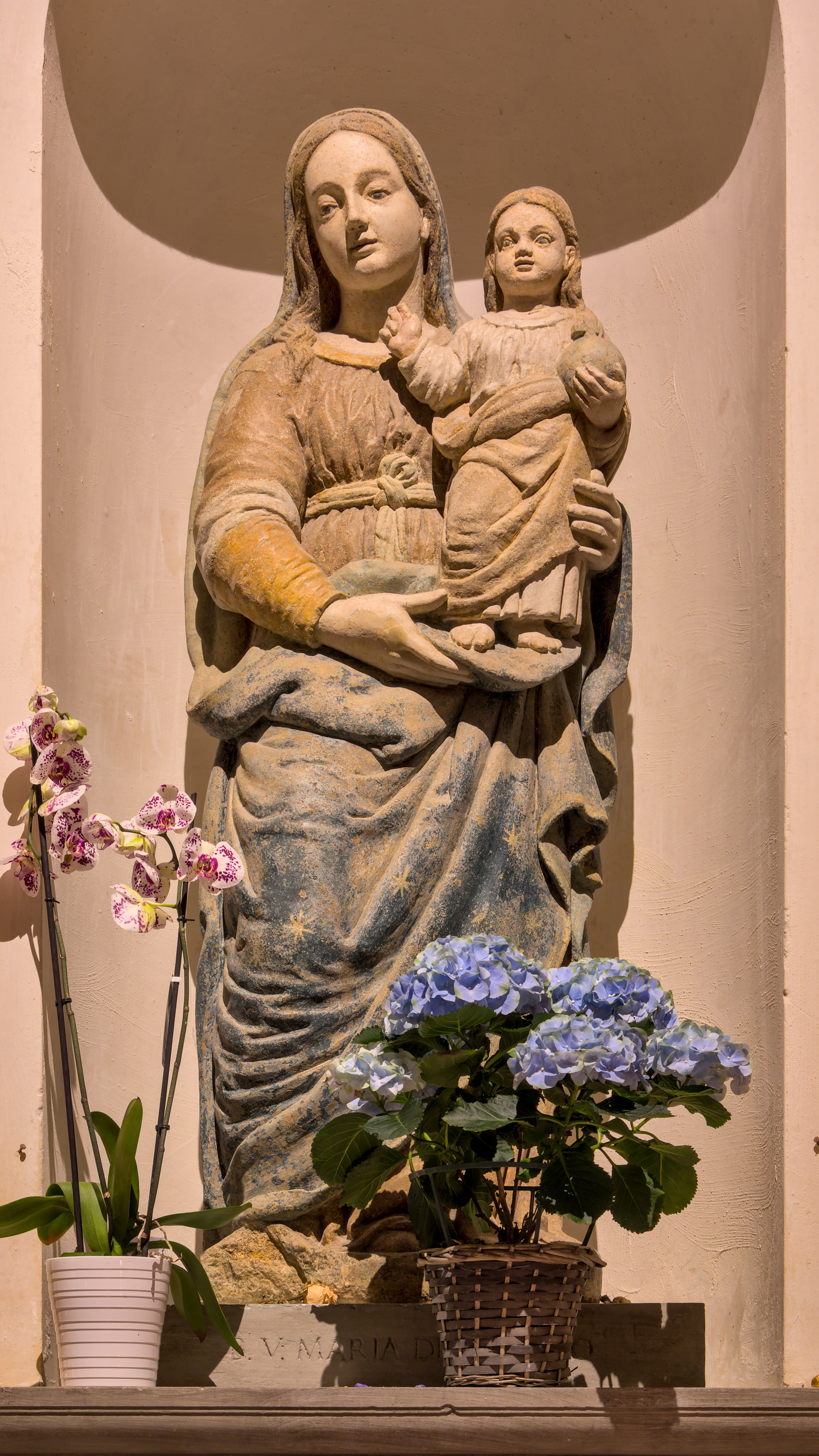
16th-century Madonna and Child

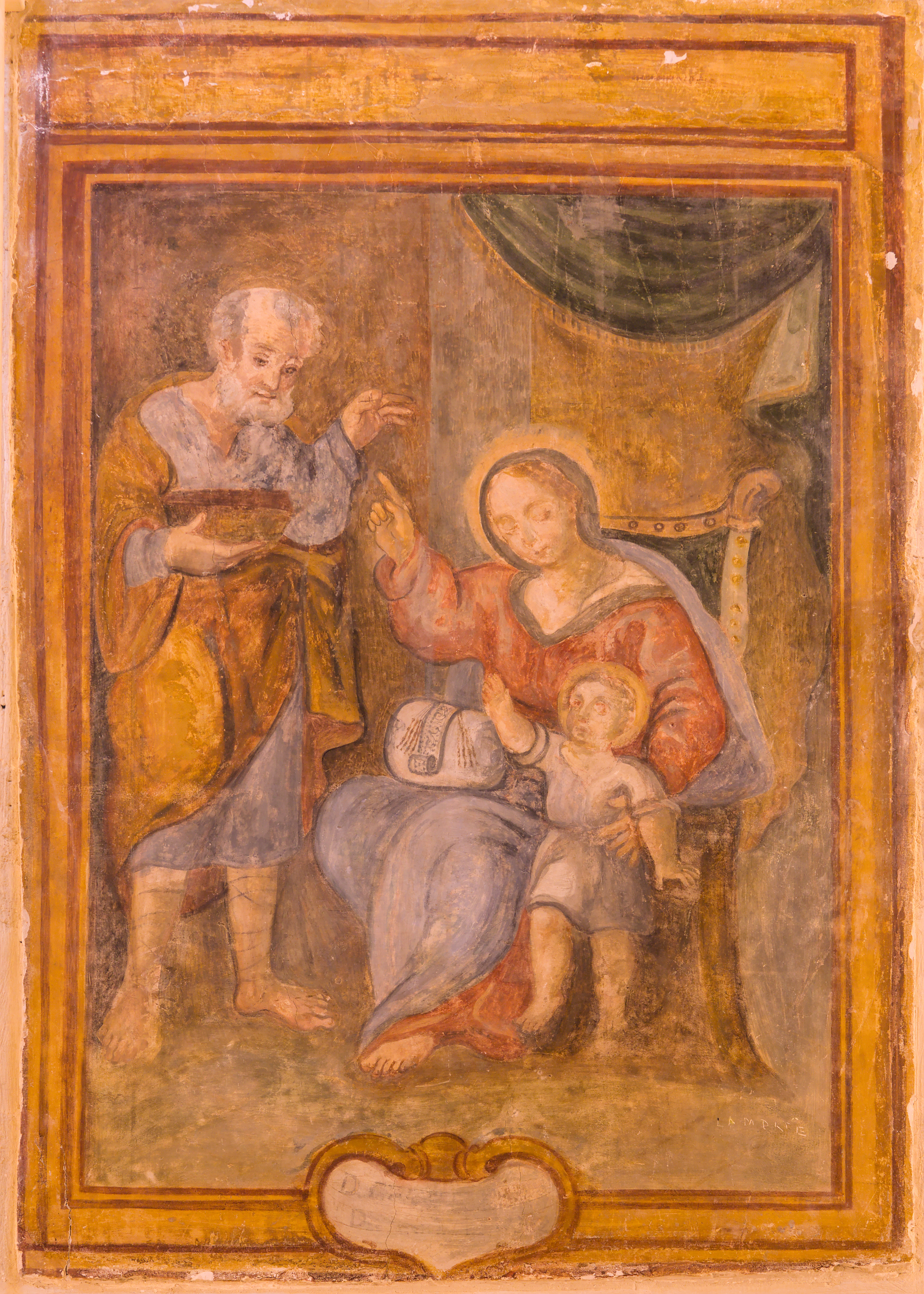
Fresco of the Holy Family

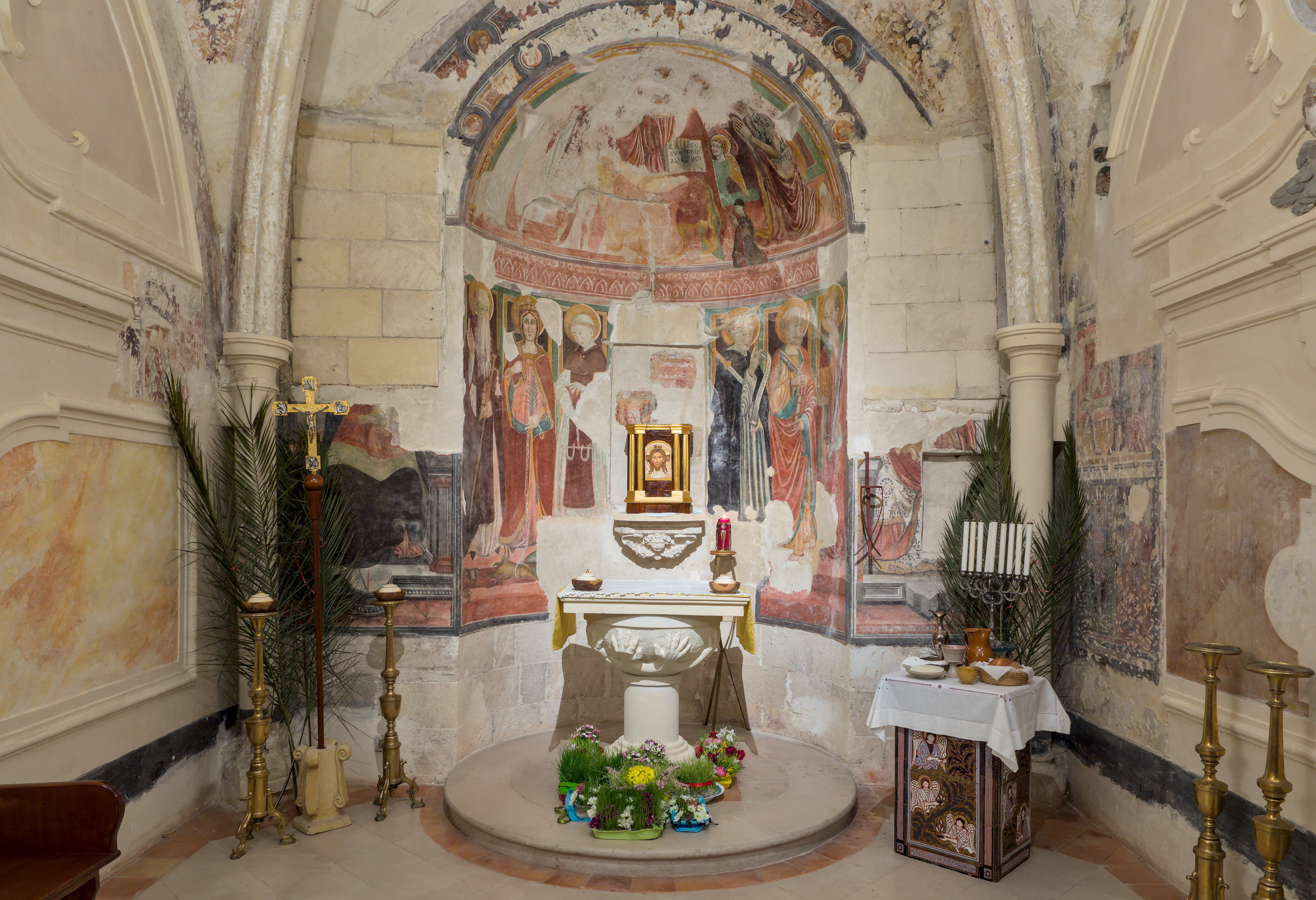
Side chapel of the Holy Sacrament, with remains of 17th-century frescos

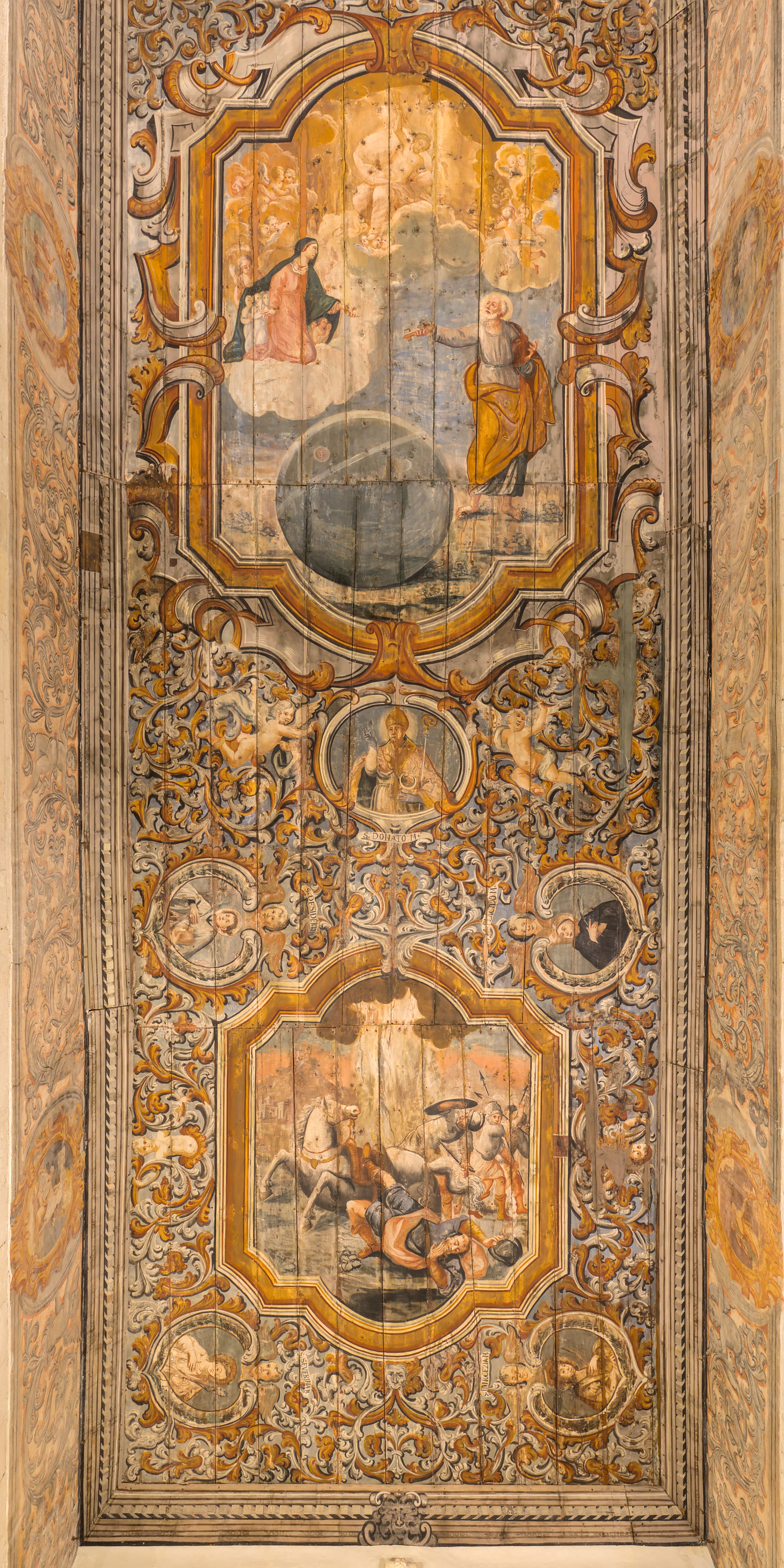
Central and rear part of the dropped ceiling : the Virgin of Gonfalone and the Conversion of Paul

== Sources and external links ==
- M. Laterza et al., "Technical and technological qualification of ancient buildings. The case of churches in ‘Sassi di Matera’", in XII International Conference on Structural Repair and Rehabilitation, 2016, pp. 26-29.
- Matera website: Cathedral (in Italian)
- Website of the Consiglio di Basilicata: La Cattedrale di Matera (in Italian)
