= Lucanian Dolomites =

Mountain range in southern Italy

Lucanian Dolomites Dolomiti lucane
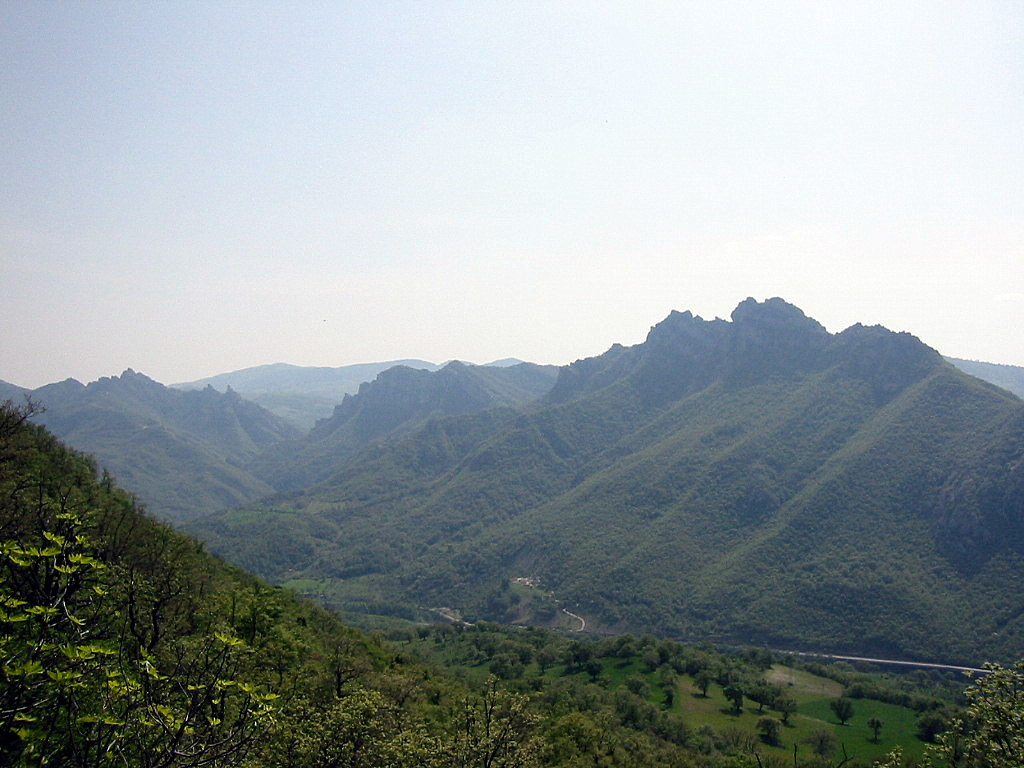

Highest point
- Peak: Monte Caperrino
- Elevation: 1,455 m (4,774 ft)
- Coordinates: 40°31.28′N 16°03.63′E

Geography
- Location within Italy
- Location: Basilicata, Italy
- Parent range: Apennine Mountains

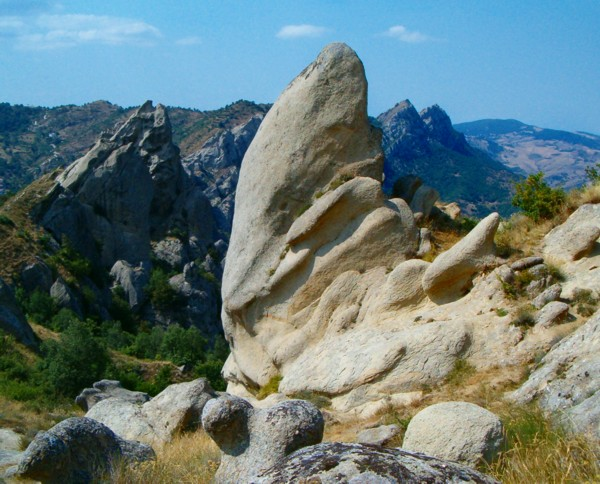
Karstic landscape of the range

The Lucanian Dolomites are a mountain range in the region of Basilicata, southern Italy. Located in the Southern Apennines and dominating the Basento Valley, the range is at the heart of the Parco Regionale Gallipoli Cognato Piccole Dolomiti Lucane, which also include the Gallipoli Cognato forest. The range owes its name to its resemblance to the peaks in the Dolomites in northern Italy. It was formed 15 million years ago.

== Description ==
Consisting of craggy peaks and shaped by karstic erosion, the range has sharp peaks with an average elevation of 1,000–1,100 metres (3,300–3,600 ft). The highest point is Monte Caperrino, also called "Piccole Dolomiti", due to its resemblance to the Dolomite mountains near Venice and Trieste.

== Flora and fauna ==
The range has a mixture of oak forest and alpine tundra. The tundra is home to unusual plants, such as red valerian, Lunaria annua, and Onosma lucana. Fauna of the range includes wild boar, red kites, swallows, kestrel, ravens, and peregrine falcons.

== Climate ==
The climate of the range is due to its remoteness from the Mediterranean, hence is characteristic of the climate of the other Apennine mountains. Winters are cold, with snow on the ground up to two or three months. Summers are cool and breezy. There is about 1,000 millimetres (39 in) of rain per year.

== Municipalities ==
Comuni in the area include:

- Castelmezzano
- Pietrapertosa
- Albano di Lucania
- Campomaggiore
