= Michele Tedesco =

Italian painter

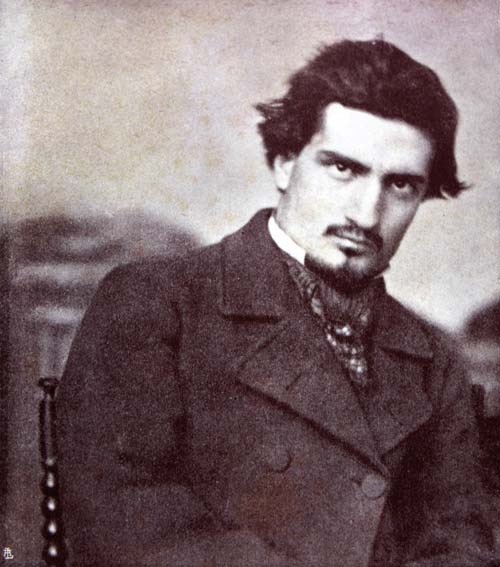
- Tedesco
- Born: 24 August 1834; Moliterno
- Died: 1918 (aged 83–84); Naples
- Spouse: Julia Hoffman

Michele Tedesco (24 August 1834 – 1918) was an Italian painter.

== Life ==
Tedesco was born in Moliterno to James and Anna in 1834. He always showed an interest in art and his mother's brother Antonio Racioppi arranged for him to study painting at the School of Humanities and Fine Arts in Naples.

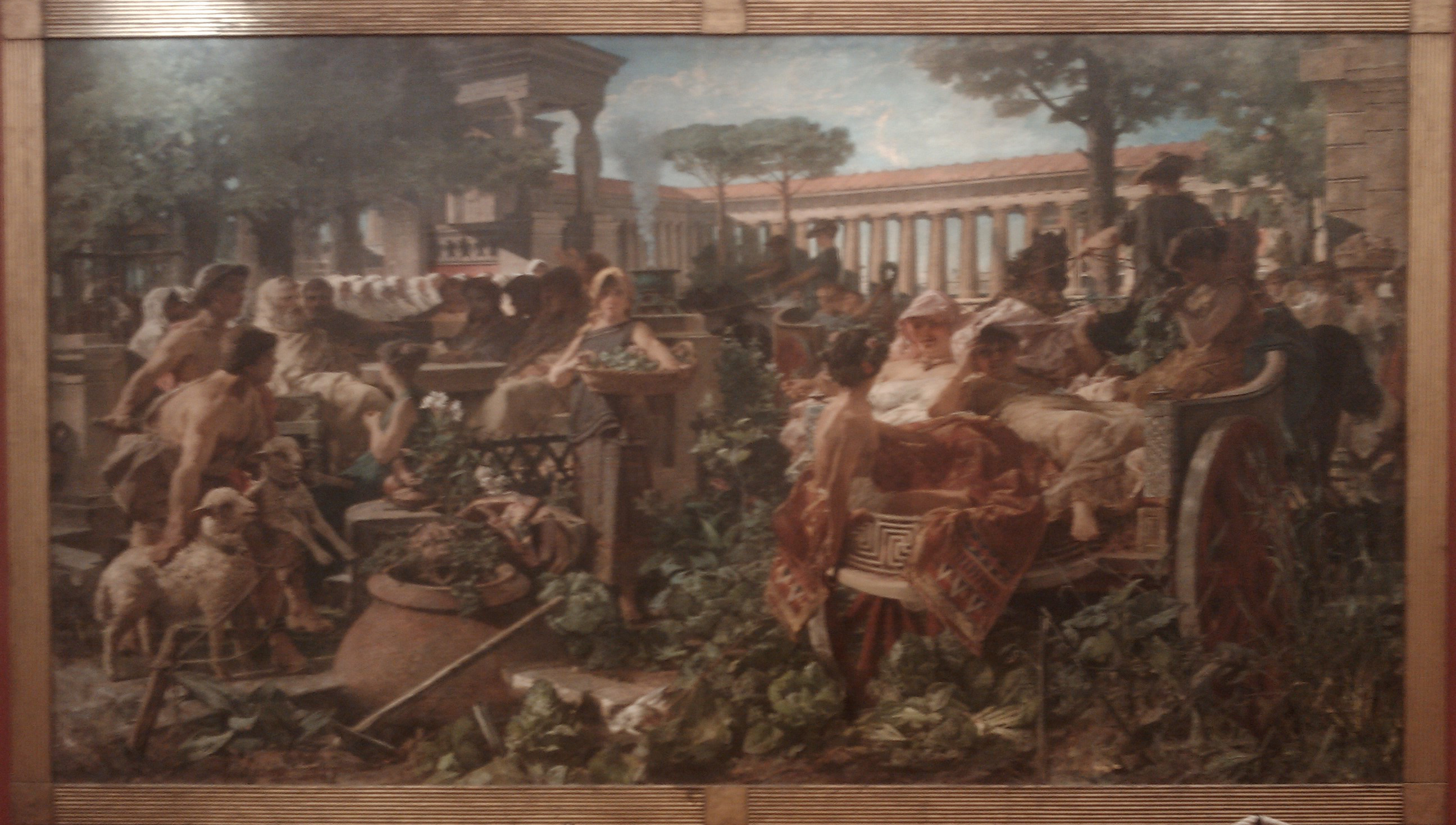
A Pythagorean School Invaded by the Sybarites

In 1860 he moved to Florence and from there he toured the major cities of Europe making a living from his talents. Whilst in Bavaria he married a fellow painter and he and Julia Hoffman established a home in Naples. In 1877 he started to teach painting and drawing in Portici and led the department of drawing and sketching. In 1890 he was elected to a chair at the Design Institute of fine Arts in Naples where he enjoyed critical acclaim.

Tedesco died in Naples in 1916. He has a large 1877 canvas showing A Pythagorean School Invaded by Sybarites in the Guildhall Art Gallery in London.

In 2012 there was a major retrospective of Tedesco's work and his contribution to Italian history.
