= Filippo Giannetti =

Italian painter (1630–1702)

- Born: 1630; Savoca, Messina, Kingdom of Sicily
- Died: 1702 (aged 71–72)
- Education: Jacopo Caro; Abraham Casembrot
- Known for: Painting
- Movement: Baroque
- Spouse: Flavia Durand Borgognone

Filippo Giannetti or Giannetto (1630 – 1702) was an Italian painter of Naples and Sicily.

== Biography ==
He was born in Savoca, near Messina. He was known as Giordano de' paesisti ("the Giordano of landscape painters") for his ability to produce prolific and rapid landscapes. He initially trained with Jacopo Caro, and later with Abraham Casembrot. His wife, Flavia, was the daughter of Giovanni Battista Durand Borgognone, a pupil of Domenichino. Flavia was known for portrait painting.
