= Pandosia =

Pandosia was the name of several ancient cities, including:

- Pandosia (Epirus), in Epirus, Greece
- Pandosia (Bruttium), in Bruttium (now Acri or Castrolibero), Italy
- Pandosia (Lucania), in Lucania (now Tursi), Italy
