= Montalbano Jonico =

Town in Basilicata, Italy

- Comune
- Comune di Montalbano Jonico
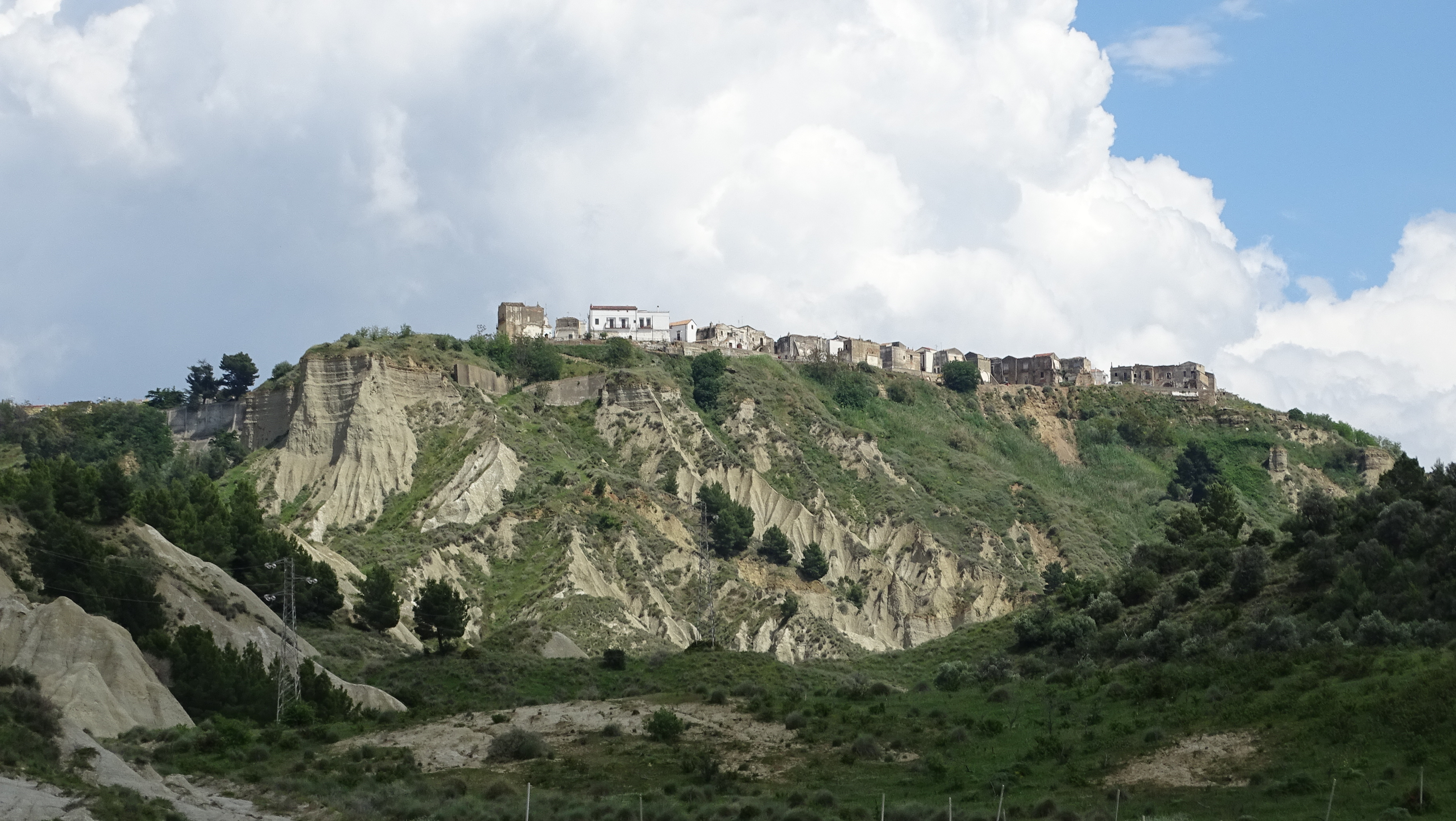
- View of Montalbano Jonico

- Coat of arms

- Location of Montalbano Jonico in Italy Montalbano Jonico (Basilicata)
- Coordinates: 40°17′N 16°34′E
- Country: Italy
- Region: Basilicata
- Province: Matera (MT)

Government
  - Mayor: Giuseppe Antonio Di Sanzo (Centre-left)

Area
  - Total: 136 km^{2} (53 sq mi)
- Elevation: 292 m (958 ft)

Population (2018-01-01)
  - Total: 7,208
  - Density: 53.0/km^{2} (137/sq mi)
- Demonym: Montalbanesi
- Time zone: UTC+1 (CET)
  - Summer (DST): UTC+2 (CEST)
- Postal code: 75023
- Dialing code: 0835
- ISTAT code: 077016
- Patron saint: Saint Maurice
- Saint day: 22 September
- Website: Official website

Montalbano Jonico (Mundalbànë) is a comune in the province of Matera, in the southern Italian region of Basilicata. On 2 April 2009, President Giorgio Napolitano granted the commune the honorary title of città (city).

== Etymology ==
The original Latin name Mons Albanus probably derives from the gentilicium Albius, which was common in southern Italy during the Republican era, when plots of ager publicus were assigned to war veterans following the conflicts with Pyrrhus (280–275 BC) and Hannibal during the Second Punic War (218–202 BC). Cicero mentioned wealthy Roman senators who owned large agricultural estates in the territory of Heraclea.

An alternative hypothesis derives the name from the Latin words mons (mountain) and albus (white), referring to the clay that composes the territory. A possible Arabic origin from Al bana, meaning "excellent place", has also been suggested.

Until 1863, the town was simply called Mont'Albano; the suffix Jonico was then added to indicate its proximity to the Ionian Sea.

== Geography ==
Montalbano Jonico is located at 292 metres (958 ft) above sea level in the south-western part of the province of Matera, between the Cavone river, which separates it from Pisticci (25 kilometres (16 mi)) to the east, and the Agri river, which divides it from Tursi (16 kilometres (9.9 mi)) to the west. To the south it borders Scanzano Jonico (17 kilometres (11 mi)), while to the north lie Craco (25 kilometres (16 mi)) and Stigliano (46 kilometres (29 mi)). The territory is predominantly hilly, with notable calanchi (clay formations shaped by erosion).

The clay ridges surrounding Montalbano Jonico contain an important geological heritage formed over more than one million years. The Tempa Petrolla geosite has been proposed as a candidate to represent the Global Boundary Stratotype Section and Point (GSSP) for the Early–Middle Pleistocene boundary.

== History ==
A Bronze Age site has been identified in the Iazzitelli district. The historical origins of Montalbano are uncertain, possibly dating to the 4th century BC. Archaeological finds from the settlement are of Hellenistic date.

The town was probably, like Pandosia, an ally of Rome at the Battle of Heraclea (280 BC), which saw Roman forces face the Epirote army allied with Tarentum and led by Pyrrhus. In the Roman period, Montalbano benefited from transhumance routes that still cross the territory, as well as from the prosperity of Heraclea.

The Hellenistic farm at Andriace, dating to the 3rd century BC, was probably part of a small agricultural settlement with a courtyard house layout, containing living quarters and spaces for processing agricultural products. The farm has been reconstructed using modern techniques.

In the Ucio district, on the right bank of the Cavone (the ancient Akalandros), the famous Heraclea Tables were discovered—bronze tablets inscribed in Greek relating to the agrarian division of the territories of the sanctuaries of Dionysus and Athena in the 4th century BC. On the reverse is inscribed in Latin the Lex Julia Municipalis of the 1st century BC. The tablets are now preserved in the Naples National Archaeological Museum.

From the Middle Ages onwards, Montalbano was a fief belonging successively to the Sanseverino, Villamari, Toledo, and Álvarez families.

The ruins of the important Byzantine monastery of San Nicola de Sylva lie at the foot of Piano Cerulli on the Agri; during the Frederician period the monastery was occupied by Cistercian monks.

The outer defensive walls date from the Aragonese period and were reconstructed after the sack by Ottoman raiders in 1555.

From 1799, the town was active in the anti-Bourbon movement. During the Fascist period, several people sentenced by the Special Tribunal for the Defense of the State were confined here, including Camilla Ravera.

In 1959 and 1974, the territory was significantly reduced when the frazioni of Policoro and Scanzano Jonico gained municipal autonomy.

== Main sights ==
- Church of Santa Maria dell'Episcopio – The main church contains a 12th-century wooden statue of the Madonna and Child.
- Norman walls – Two square towers and numerous arrow slits remain.
- Palazzo De Ruggeri – Houses the "Melchiorre da Montalbano" contemporary art space and civic library.
- Palazzo Rondinelli (17th century) – Contains a picture gallery and the civic library's historic collection (16th–20th century, approximately 9,000 volumes).
- Terravecchia – Built around the castle, considered a Frederician domus, the only one in the province of Matera; now partly incorporated into houses and partly collapsed.
- Clock Gate (19th century) – Part of the older medieval walls, reconstructed after two collapses from an original pointed-arch design of Frederician origin.

== Transport ==
From 1932 to 1972, the town was served by the narrow-gauge Bari–Matera–Montalbano Jonico railway operated by the Ferrovie Appulo Lucane. The station building still exists but is no longer in use.

== Notable people ==
- Domenico Pozzovivo (born 1982), professional cyclist
