= Albino Pierro =

Italian poet (1916–1995)

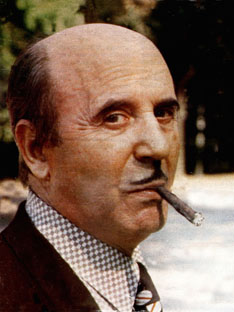
Albino Pierro

Albino Pierro (19 November 1916 in Tursi – 23 March 1995 in Rome) was an Italian poet. He was famous for his works in Lucan dialect, and being nominated for the Nobel Prize in Literature.

== Biography ==
Pierro was born in Tursi in the province of Matera. He had a very troubled childhood, his mother dying prematurely.

As a teenager, after a period of frequent journeys to Taranto, Salerno, Sulmona, Udine and Novara, Pierro settled in Rome in 1939. He graduated in 1944 in philosophy, and in 1946 began his career as a letter published in various collections in the language, until in 1959 with A land we remember which began its production in dialect Tourist Office. Since then he pulled away from the language of his native land, where the militant criticism reflected the deepest impressions of the Romance languages, thanks to phonic resources and symbolic idiom.

In 1976, he won the award Carducci for poetry. In 1986 and 1988, he was close to winning the Nobel Prize for Literature, was recognized as a great poet even abroad. In 1985 was invited by the Stockholm University to a poetry reading. Received in 1992 honorary degree from University of Basilicata. In 1993 The Normale di Pisa school organized a meeting with the poet.

On 23 March 1996, exactly one year after Pierro's death, the City Council, proclaimed Tursi "City of Pierro" and named the schools, including kindergarten, elementary and Media, after him. To the City of Tursi has donated his house and the library containing thousands of books.

== English language translations ==
- Luigi Bonaffini, ed. (2002). Selected poems. Translator Luigi Bonaffini. Guernica Editions. ISBN 978-1-55071-078-6.

== Italian language works ==
- Liriche, Palatina, Roma 1946
- Nuove Liriche, Danesi in via Margutta, Roma 1949
- Mia madre passava, Fratelli Palombi, Roma 1956
- Il transito del vento, Dell'Arco, Roma 1957
- Poesie, Roma, 1958
- Il mio villaggio, Cappelli, Bologna 1959
- Agavi e Sassi, Dell'Arco, Roma 1960
- Appuntamento, Editori Laterza, Bari 1967
- Incontro a Tursi, Editori Laterza, Bari 1973

== Works in the Lucan vernacular ==
- A terra d'u ricorde, Il Nuovo Belli, Roma 1960
  - (FR) La terre du souvenir, translation Madeleine Santschi, Scheiwiller, Milano 1972.
- Metaponte, Il Nuovo Cracas, Roma 1960
  - Metaponto, Editori Laterza, Bari 1966
  - (FR) Metaponto, translation M. Santschi, Milano 1972
  - Metaponto, Garzanti, Milano 1982
  - (FR) Métaponte, translation Philippe Guérin, note di Gina Labriola, La Différence, [S. l.] 1996
- I'nnammurète, Editori Laterza, Bari 1963
  - (FR) Les amoreaux, translation M. Sanschti, Milano 1971.
- Nd'u piccicarelle di Turse, Editori Laterza, Bari 1967
- Eccò 'a morte?, Editori Laterza, Bari 1969
- Famme dorme, Scheiwiller, Milano 1971
  - (FR) Laisse-moi dormir, translation M. Sanschti e note d’Antonio Pizzuto, Milano 1977.
- Curtelle a lu sòue, Editori Laterza, Bari 1973
  - (FR) Couteaux au soleil, translation M. Santschi, Milano 1977.
- Nu belle fatte, Mondadori, Milano 1975
  - (EN) A beautiful Story, translation E. Farnsworth, introduzione di Gianfranco Folena, Milano 1976.
  - (FR) Une belle histoire, translation M. Santschi, Scheiwiller, Milano 1977.
- Com'agghi 'a fe?, Edizioni 32, Milano 1977
  - (FR) Comm’agghì‘a fè, translation M. Santschi, Milano 1975.
- Sti mascre, L'Arco Ed.d'Arte, Roma 1980
- Dieci poesie inedite in dialetto tursitano, Pacini, Lucca 1981
- Poesie inedite in omaggio a Pierro, Lacaita, Manduria 1982
- Ci uéra turnè, Ed.del Girasole, Ravenna 1982
- Si pò nu jurne, Gruppo Forma, Torino 1983
- Poesie tursitane, Ed.del Leone, Venezia 1985
- Tante ca pàrete notte, Manni, Galatina 1986
- Un pianto nascosto, Einaudi, Torino 1986
- Nun c'è pizze di munne, Mondadori, Milano 1992

=== Videography ===
- Documentary Albino Pierro. Investigation of a poet, created by Maria Luisa Forenza, which lasted 51 minutes, broadcast on RAI1 on 22 January 2007.

=== Critical Studies ===
- Cesare Vico Lodovici (1958). Pierro. Rome: Dell'Arco.
- G. Savarese (1966). The lyric tursitana Albino Pierro. The New Cracas.
- M. Zangara (1966). The poem in dialect Albino Pierro. The New Cracas.
- W. Mauro (1969). Albino Pierro poet Lucan, in "Reality of the South", n. 6.
- ANTHOLOGY (1969). testimonies Pierro. Bari: Laterza.
- Giuliano Manacorda (1972). Albino Pierro, in "Our Time", collected in July 1965 Twenty years of patience. Florence: The New Italy.
- Aldo Rossi (1978). Albino Pierro, in "Belphegor", 31 July 1978.
- Pier Vincenzo Mengaldo (1978). Albino Pierro in "Italian poets of the twentieth century". Milan: Mondadori.
- G. Jovine (1979). Southern and magic in the poetry of Albino Pierro, in "Literary Criticism", n. 22.
- Antonio Piromalli (1979). Albino Pierro: dialect and poetry. Cassino, Garigliano.
- ANTHOLOGY (1982). Homage to Pierre. Manduria: Lacaita.
- Francesco Zambon (1986). Albino Pierro, in "Critical Dictionary of Italian Literature" (Utet ed.). Torino.
- Franco Brevini (1987). Albino Pierro, in "dialect poets of the twentieth century". Torino: Einaudi.
- Emeric Giachery (1987). The interpreter of the poet [Letters to Albino Pierro]. Venova: Hosanna.
- G. Delia (1990). Metaponto and surroundings. Toward the study of Albino Pierro. Castrovillari: The Coscile.
- L. D'Amato (1993). The words found. A reading of Albino Pierro. Venosa.
- Rocco Brancati (1999). Portrait of a poet - Albino Pierro - The Prize. Naples: RCE.
- Emeric Giachery (2003). Albino Pierro great lyric. Torino: Genesis.
