= Monte Calvario (Colobraro) =

Mountain in Italy

- Location within Italy

Highest point
- Elevation: 777 m (2,549 ft)
- Coordinates: 40°11′53″N 16°25′17″E

Geography
- Location: Basilicata, Italy
- Parent range: Southern Apennines

Mount Calvario is a peak belonging to the Apennine Mountain chain. It is 777 m above sea level and on its southern slopes rises the municipality of Colobraro.

At the top of the mountain, there is a cross, the destination of a traditional procession which, starting from Colobrario, is held on the penultimate Saturday of May.
