= Tursi =

Comune in Basilicata, Italy

- Comune
- Comune di Tursi
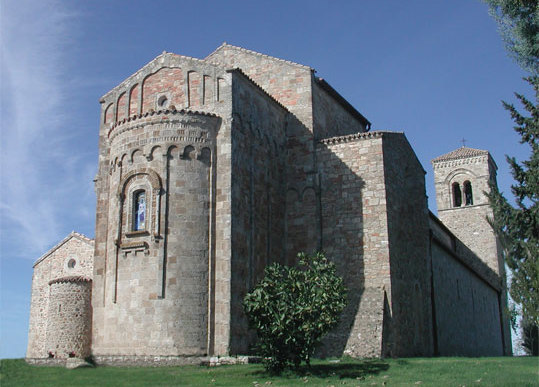
- The Church of Anglona in Tursi

- Location within Italy Location within Basilicata
- Coordinates: 40°15′N 16°28′E
- Country: Italy
- Region: Basilicata
- Province: Matera (MT)
- Frazioni: Anglona, Panevino, Caprarico

Government
  - Mayor: Salvatore Cosma

Area
  - Total: 159.93 km^{2} (61.75 sq mi)
- Elevation: 243 m (797 ft)

Population (31 August 2023)
  - Total: 4,712
  - Density: 29.46/km^{2} (76.31/sq mi)
- Demonym: Tursitani
- Time zone: UTC+1 (CET)
  - Summer (DST): UTC+2 (CEST)
- Postal code: 75028
- Dialing code: 0835
- ISTAT code: 077029
- Patron saint: St. Philip Neri
- Saint day: May 26
- Website: Official website

Tursi (Turse in Tursitano dialect; Ancient Greek: Θυρσοί, romanized: Thursoí; Latin: Tursium) is an Italian comune of 4,712 inhabitants in the province of Matera in Basilicata, elevated to a city by decree of the President of the Republic Carlo Azeglio Ciampi on May 4, 2006. The municipality is home to the Basso Sinni mountain community.

The urban center began to develop in the 5th century around the castle, in 1561 it was among the most populous, and in 1601 it was the city in the province of the kingdom with the largest number of fires, numbering 1799, ahead of Melfi (1772), Venosa (1095), Potenza (1082) and Tricarico (1073).

In 968, in Byzantine times, Tursi became the capital of the theme of Lucania, and an episcopal see of the Greek rite. From the beginning of the 18th century and until the Bourbon reform of 1816 (except in 1799, when it was annexed to the department of Crati, i.e., Cosentian Calabria), Tursi was the first of the four subdivisions of the then province of Basilicata, the Royal Collector of Basilicata was based there, and its boundaries, which extended to the Ionian Sea, included the tower of Trisaja, south of the mouth of the Sinni River, one of the seven coastal towers of the Kingdom of Naples protecting the Ionian coast of Basilicata.

== Physical geography ==
=== Territory ===
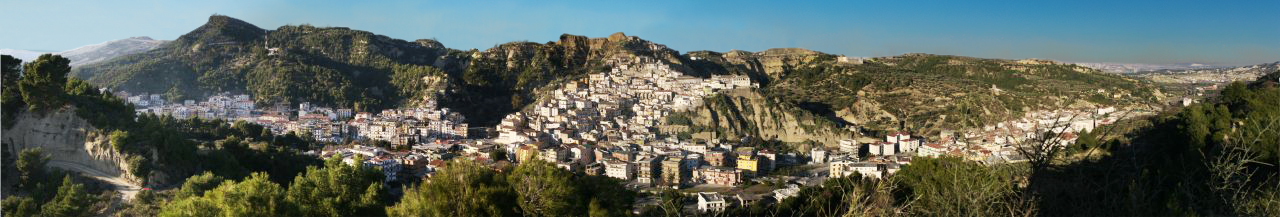
Longitudinal view of Tursi.

Tursi's predominantly hilly territory is bordered to the north by the Agri River and the municipality of Montalbano Jonico, to the east by the municipality of Policoro, to the south by the Sinni River and the territories of Rotondella, and to the west by the territories of Sant'Arcangelo, Colobraro, and Stigliano. The height of the urban sector ranges from 346 meters above sea level of the old historical center around the castle, to 210 meters above sea level of the modern Piazza Maria Santissima of Anglona and to 170 meters above sea level of the lower districts.

The inhabited core of the historic center (Rabatana) is naturally protected by three chasms, more than a hundred meters in length, originating from landslides; the "Palmara ditch" (a Iaramma) to the north, the "St. Francis ditch" (u fòss d'San Francisch) to the east, and the "Cathedral ditch" (u fòss da Catr'dé) to the west. The village, over the centuries, has developed in the valley below the Rabatana, taking on an elongated shape. The town is about 20 km from the Ionian coast of Lucania, but the hamlet of Panevino, on the eastern border of the territory, is about 6 km away. Due to the composition of the terrain, the town has a seismic risk of 2, which corresponds to medium-high seismicity according to the current classification index.

==== Hydrology ====
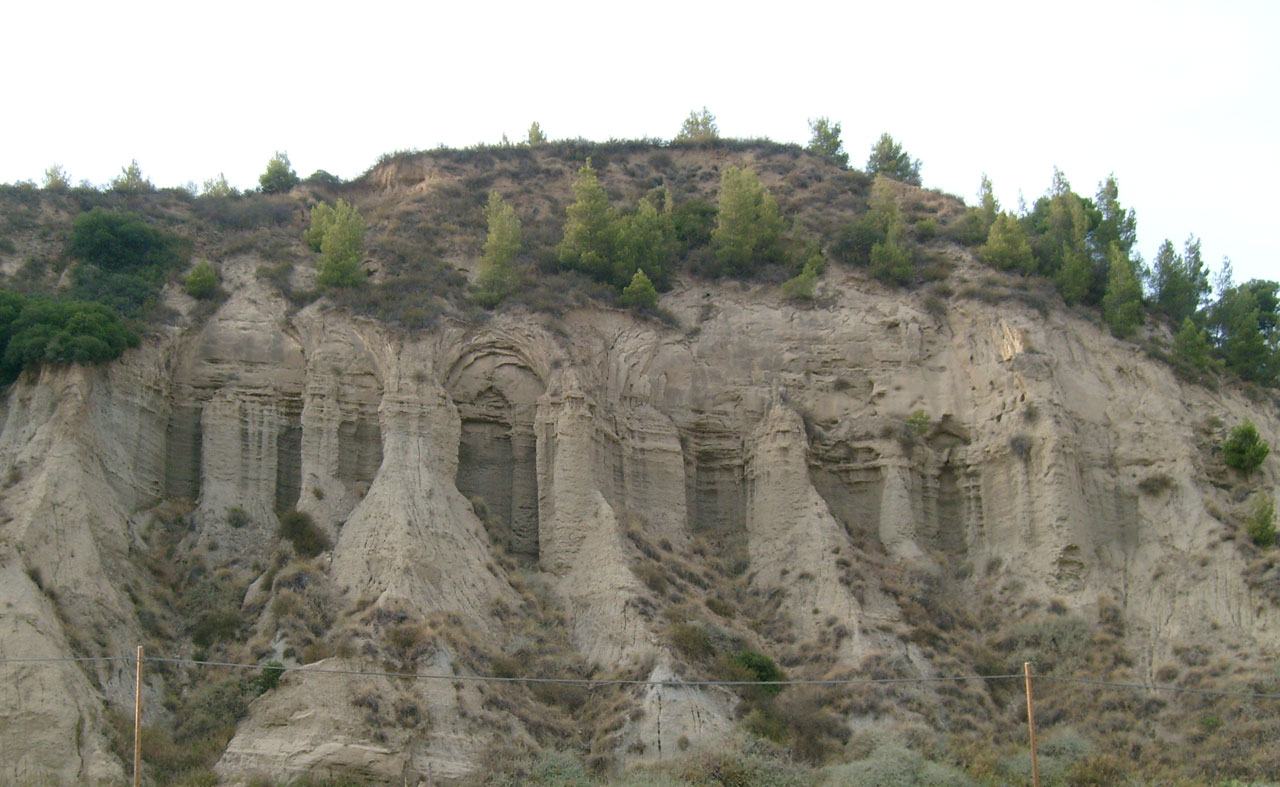
Detail of Tursi's gullies.

The city is located in the middle of two of the four rivers of Basilicata, the Agri and the Sinni, which were originally navigable. The Gannano dam, with a total capacity of 2.6 million cubic meters, near the town of Caprarico, interrupts the course of the Agri, while the Monte Cotugno dam, the largest rammed-earth dam in Europe, near the town of Senise, interrupts the course of the Sinni.

From a spring on the hill east of Tursi flows the Pescogrosso stream, which takes its name from the huge boulders found along its course. The stream crosses the town at an altitude of 190 meters above sea level and continues for about ten kilometers to the east, where it becomes a tributary of the river Sinni.

==== Geology and morphology ====
The territory dates back to the ancient Cenozoic and is formed by marly rocks, a very friable sedimentary mass composed of clay and limestone, with an earthy appearance and yellow ochre color. The morphology of the land has constantly changed over time due to continuous landslides caused by the extreme plasticity of these rocks with each rainfall. The changing nature of the terrain, full of gullies, has caused a peculiar impact on the landscape of the area.

=== Climate ===
The nearest meteorological station is that of Montalbano Jonico. According to average data for the 30-year period from 1961 to 1990, the average temperature of the coldest month, January, is +7.4 °C, while that of the hottest month, August, is 25.5 °C.

- Climate classification of Tursi:
  - Climate zone D;
  - Degree days 1.452.

== Origins of the name ==
Many historians agree that the place name Tursi derives from “Turcico,” a Byzantine-born man-at-arms, commander of the area, who expanded the old Saracen village, “Rabatana,” towards the valley, giving the new area the name Toursicon, Tursikon or Tursicon, Τουρσικόν in Greek. However, the first documented mention dates back to 968 in the Relatio de legatione Constantinopolitana of Bishop Liutprand of Cremona, when the town is mentioned precisely by the names of “Turcico” and “Tower of Turcico.”

Later, with French pronunciation under Norman rule, it first became Tursico, then Tursio and finally Tursi. In the papal bull drafted by Pope Alexander II in 1068 the town is mentioned under the toponym “Tower of Tursio.”

A century later, in 1154, the Arab geographer Muhammad al-Idrisi during the creation of the Tabula Rogeriana on behalf of Roger II of Sicily, in the text Kitab nuzhat al-mushtaq fi'khtiraq al-'afaq, known as the book of King Roger, points to the city under the toponym of Tursah.

== History ==
=== Origins ===
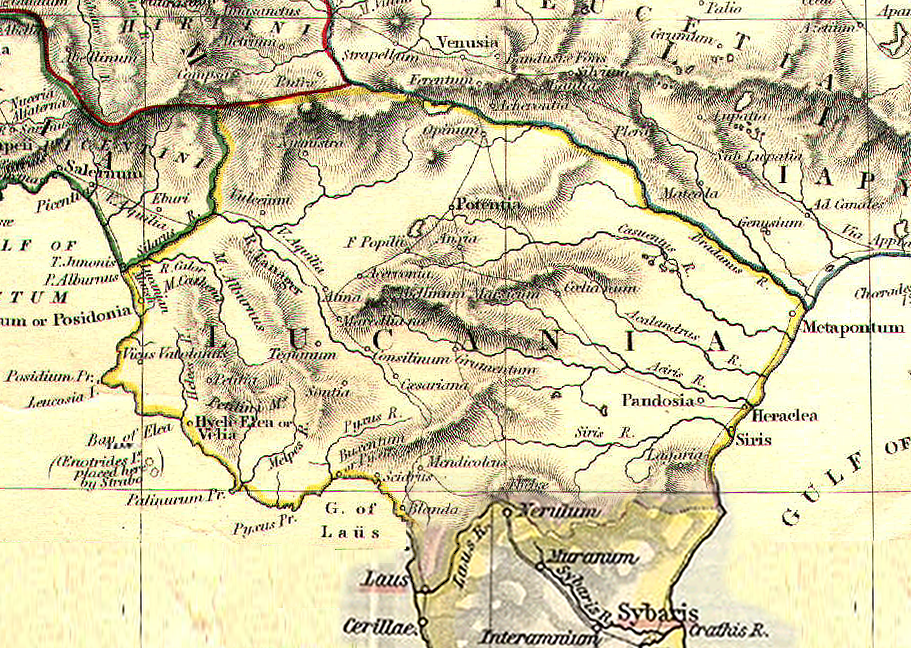
The historical region of Lucania.

Archaeological excavations carried out in the municipal territory, more precisely, around Anglona and nearby Policoro, have unearthed countless items currently housed in the National Archaeological Museum of the Siritide, ascertaining the existence of settlements dating back to the early Iron Age. As of the 15th century B.C., the inhabitants of these areas were called Oenotrians, but in particular, the inhabitants settled around the Agri and Sinni rivers were called Coni or Choni. Later, around the 8th century BC, several colonies were founded on the Ionian coast by Greeks from Ionia, including Siris, Heraclea, Metaponto and Pandosia.

Pandosia, which bordered Heraclea, is considered the oldest city in the Siritide. Antonini basing himself on passages from the Genealogy of Pherecydes of Athens and passages from the Ancient History of Rome by Dionysius of Halicarnassus, speculates that Pandosia was founded by Oenotrus, one of the 23 sons of Lycaon, many centuries before Rome, and that he ruled over the whole eastern part of Lucania. It was very rich and important because of the fertile soil and strategic location. The two large Lucanian rivers, the Agri and the Sinni, which were navigable at that time, and the ancient Via Herculea, which ran from Heraclea up the Agri valley for more than 60 km to the Roman city of Grumentum, facilitated communications and thus favored a rapid expansion of the city. Romanelli, relying on findings from the Heraclean Tablets and Pliny the Elder's Naturalis Historia, asserts that the Pandosia of Lucania is the place where Alexander Molossus, king of Epirus and maternal uncle of Alexander the Great, lost his life in 330 B.C. in a battle against the Lucanians.

In 281 B.C. it was a battlefield between the Romans and Pyrrhus, king of Epirus, who ran to the aid of the Tarentines and camped between Heraclea and Pandosia. This battle went down in history mainly because of the use of war elephants, still unknown to the soldiers of the Roman Republic. It was thanks to this unit that Pyrrhus won the battle of Heraclea, however, taking a very high number of casualties, and it was from this circumstance that the expression “Pyrrhic victory” was born. In 214 B.C. it was the scene of yet another battle in the course of the Second Punic War between the Romans and Hannibal, king of the Carthaginians, to gain dominance over the Mediterranean.

Pandosia was destroyed between 81 B.C. and 72 B.C. during the Social Wars led by the Roman general Lucius Cornelius Sulla. From the ruins of Pandosia arose, shortly before the Christian era, Anglona (Anglonum). Historian Placidus Troyli, examining the ancient buildings in the area, derives the origin of the city of Tursi, as a direct thread, from the decay of Pandosia, and the findings of “Murata” area, in the archaeological site of Contrada Castello, indicate the pre-existence of an oppidum.

In 410 the Visigoths of Alaric I invaded Italy, from the northeast, and sacking city after city, they headed toward Calabria and then moved up and sacked Rome. During their course, in the Metapontino, they built a tower on the hill halfway between the Agri and Sinni rivers to better control the surrounding valleys. In their looting, they half-destroyed Anglona, originating a small migration of the inhabitants who survived the looting, to rock shelters present around the tower, thus beginning a primordial settlement of the city.

=== Middle Ages ===
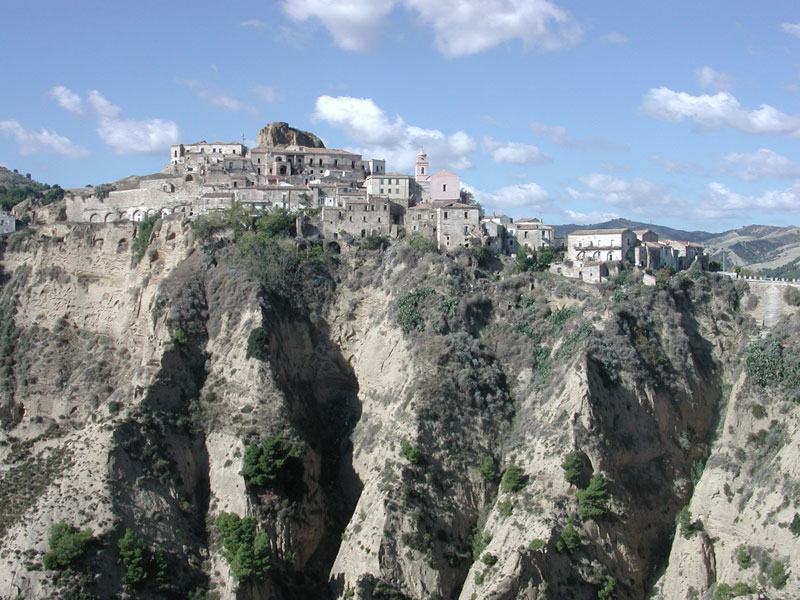
Panorama of the historic center, Rabatana district.

In the ninth century, around 826 to be precise, at the height of the Islamic campaign, there were numerous violent Arab raids throughout southern Italy. Their armies from North Africa were predominantly of Saracen origin. Initially these raids were intended to plunder villages and take prisoners to be used as slaves in the centers of the Islamic empire. Later, having overcome the initial religious and cultural differences with the native populations, the invaders around 850 conquered much of the Metapontine plain and decided to quarter themselves in dominant and strategic areas, to better control trade within the territory. Since they were expert dry-crop farmers and skilled artisans, the Saracens quickly managed to weave peaceful relationships with the local inhabitants.

Since they were expert dry-crop farmers and skilled artisans, the Saracens quickly managed to weave peaceful relationships with the local inhabitants. The flourishing exchange made possible the development of small military garrisons (ribāṭ) into full-fledged residential quarters called rabatane, the most important of which still include those of Tursi, Tricarico and Pietrapertosa.

In later years, the Saracens inhabited the village, enlarged it and they were the ones who gave it its name, in memory of their Arab village Rabhàdi. The Saracen influence is still present today in the buildings, customs, food and dialect of Rabatana.

In 890 the Byzantines reconquered the territories that once belonged to the Western Roman Empire and succeeded, during the Arab-Byzantine wars, in finally driving out the Arab influence from the Lucanian lands as well. During the years of Byzantine rule, the center experienced both demographic and building development, and the village began to extend toward the valley below. The entire center took the name Toursikon, after its founder Turcico.

Toward the end of the 10th century, Emperor Basil I first formed the theme of Longobardia and the theme of Calabria and later, in 968 the theme of Lucania with Toursikon as its capital, thus completing the Hellenization plan of the Catepanate church. In his Relatio de legatione Constantinopolitana, written in the same year, Liutprand of Cremona reports that at that time Patriarch Polyeuctus of Constantinople received from Emperor Nikephoros Phokas the authorization to erect the metropolitan see of Otranto, giving Metropolitan Peter the authority to consecrate the suffragan bishops of Acerenza, Tursi, Gravina, Matera and Tricarico. It is unclear, however, whether these provisions had any real effect, since the Notitiae Episcopatuum of the patriarchate of Constantinople mentions only one suffragan see of Otranto, namely the one of Tursi, while the other dioceses mentioned by Liutprand likely continued to gravitate to the area of Latin influence.

Tursi thus became the seat of the Greek-rite diocese with an episcopal chair at the church of St. Michael the Archangel where the synod of bishops was held in 1060. The first known bishop of Tursi is the Greek Michael, documented in a testamentary act of 1050.

Later, towards the end of the year 1000, a large migration of Normans, in the guise of pilgrims heading to holy places of Christianity and in the guise of mercenaries ready to fight for a piece of land, arrived in southern Italy. They easily inserted themselves into the internal struggles between the Lombards and Byzantines, soon gaining land and benefits. The Normans contributed greatly to the city's growth, just as the Swabians did first and then the Angevins.

=== Modern Age ===
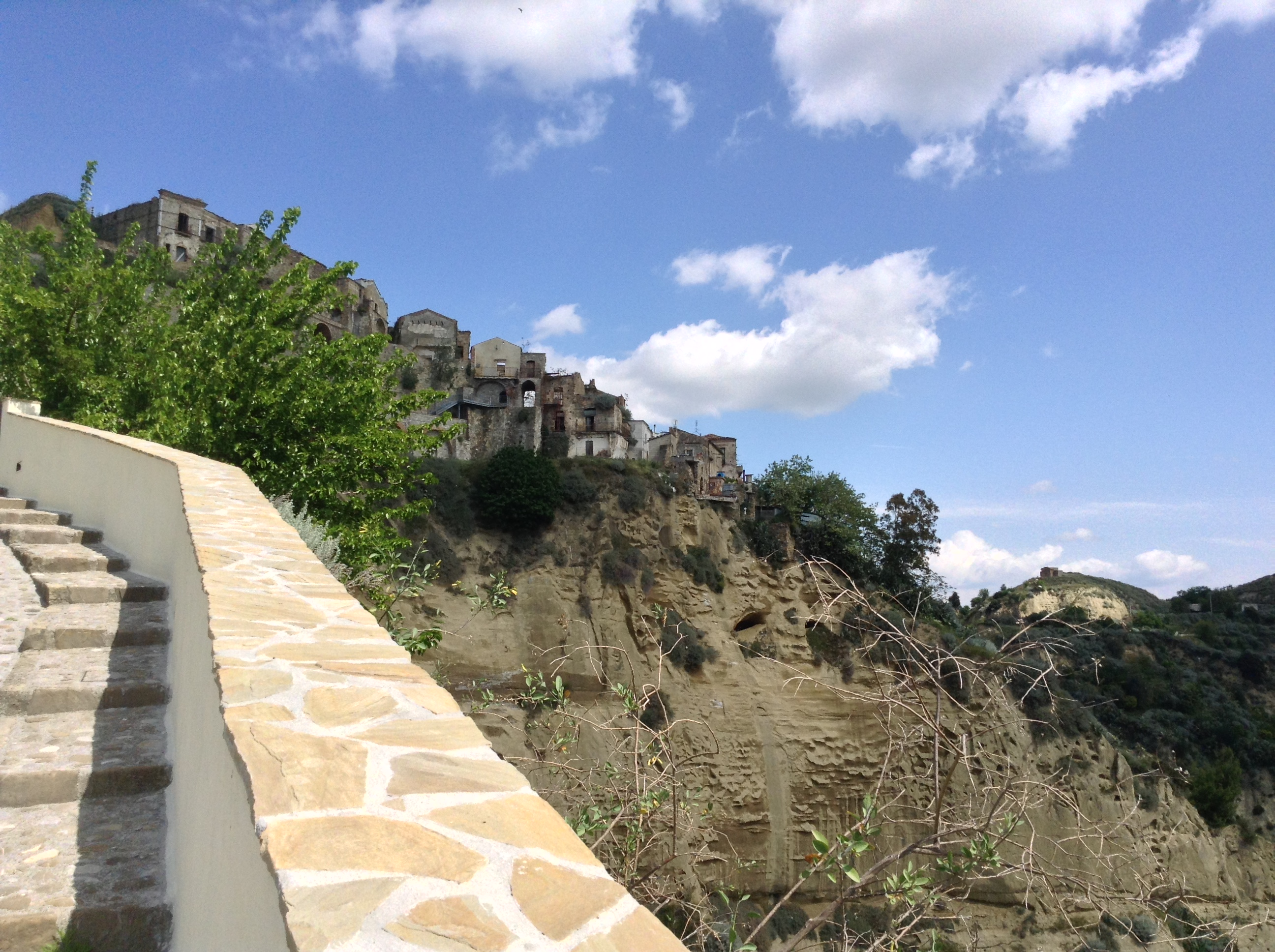
The “Petrizza,” which connects the Rabatana to the rest of the town, commissioned by the Duke of Tursi, Carlo Doria, in 1594.

Between the 13th century and the 14th century the nearby Anglona suffered numerous fires, most notably in 1369 when the entire town was set on fire. The fire was so strong and devastating that it decreed its decline. The relocation of citizens from the Anglona settlement, at the behest of Queen Joanna I, led to a significant transformation of Tursi, which until then could only be traced back to the Rabatana fortress. Thus massive construction activity began outside the Rabatana bridge, the only access to the core of the settlement.

In the 16th century Tursi was among the most populous towns in the region, with over ten thousand inhabitants. In 1543 the dioceses of Anglona and Tursi were united, constituting the diocese of Anglona-Tursi, which from 1546 had a chair in Tursi.

In 1552 Charles V, Emperor of the Holy Roman Empire assigned the Principality of Melfi to the admiral and statesman Andrea Doria. Upon his death in 1560 the title passed to his nephew, Prince of Melfi Gianandrea Doria. Later, in 1594, Carlo Doria inherited the county, then duchy, from his father, becoming the first duke of Tursi. Out of gratitude to the townspeople he renamed his home from Palazzo Doria to Palazzo Tursi, currently the seat of the municipality of Genoa. In those years Carlo Doria had a huge stone staircase (“petrizza”) built in the Rabatana district at his own expense, which is still in use today and has the peculiarity of possessing the same number of steps as the staircase present inside Palazzo Tursi.

A document from 1616 shows a dispute between two noble families of Tursi, the Picolla and the Brancalasso in the election of the new Chamberlain of the Rabatana. This testimony brings to light the existence of a public office of the Universitas of Tursi, especially in charge of the security of the Rabatana emphasizing the clear separation not only physical but also political-institutional between the village and the rest of the inhabited area.

In January 1735 King Charles III of Spain visited the lands along the Ionian coast, and the province of Basilicata then and until the Bourbon reform of 1816 comprised 117 municipalities and was divided into 4 subdivisions: Tursi, Maratea, Tricarico and Melfi. The Tursi apportionment included 30 towns, stretched from Montescaglioso to Ferrandina, to the borders of Calabria and from Terranova di Pollino to Gallicchio, and was the seat of the Royal Collector of Basilicata.

In 1769 the Doria lost the land, which was bought by the noble families of Donnaperna, Picolla, Panevino, Camerino and Brancalasso.

=== Contemporary age ===
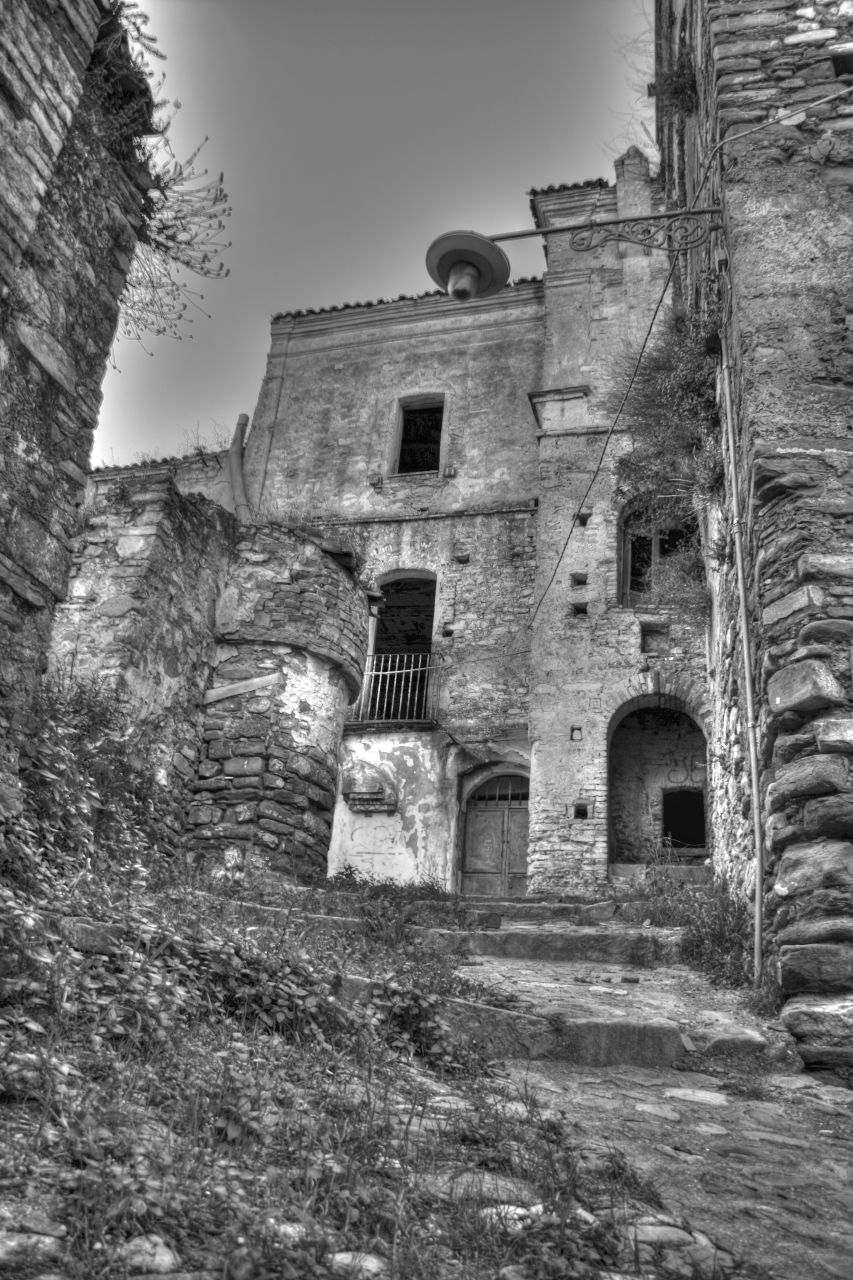
Uninhabited ruins of the historic center.

In 1848 during the Springtime of the Peoples, Tursi saw the manifestation of uprisings that allowed the occupation of vast territories of the bishopric and the demesnes “Pisone,” “Monaca,” “Pozzo di Penne,” “Pantano,” and “Stigliano.” The territory of Tursi proved to be a hot spot for uprisings, due to the vast agrarian and cultivable area available to the town, which was among the largest in the area. In 1860 with the rise of the Lucanian insurrection, and shortly before, with the Gattini massacre in the town of Matera, the uprisings in Tursi were not long in coming either. At the first manifestation of unrest, the bishop of Anglona-Tursi, Gennaro Acciardi, fled the city. He took refuge in Naples and was the promoter of a reactionary movement by issuing a “pastoral action against the new political order,” but the reactionary demonstrations were quickly quelled.

During 1861 with the unification of Italy the first incidents of brigandage were attested in the woods between Policoro, Nova Siri, Rotondella and Tursi. (Note: ASP, Prefecture, Brigandage, 1.5. Telegram dated May 15, 1861, from the Prefect of Potenza informing the Subprefect of Castrovillari about kidnappings committed in the area straddling the Calabro-Lucano border between the districts of Castrovillari and Lagonegro) The band of the brigand Scaliero of Latronico, just near Tursi, crossed paths with a squad of the National Guard. In the scuffle soldier Giuseppe Buglione lost his life. (Note: ASP, Trials of Historical Value, 222.13, Armed Gang Association, Conspiracy Against the Government, Murder, Robbery and Others, against Antonio Filardi, Nicola Sammartino, Egidantonio Papandrea and 25 other wrongdoers, c. 3) Other bands in the forest area were those of the brigand Alessandro Marino, natural son of Baron Villani of Castronuovo, (Note: ASP, Trials of Historical Value, 270.2-3, Alessandro Marino and others, charged with constituting an armed band and making an attempt directed at destroying the form of government, in S. Chirico Raparo, f. 2, c. 3.) and the band of the brigand Antonio Franco of Francavilla in Sinni, both of whom united in 1862. (Note: ASP, Trials of Historical Value, 223.11 Antonio Franco and others, accused of association of malefactors and robbery in Chiaromonte, 1862, c. 25.) In the following years, Marino himself would be shot in Tursi in 1864 after being captured during a firefight with the Chiaromonte National Guard.

These episodes and some raids against local peasants forced the municipality of Tursi to make several requests to the subprefecture for troops, which were always rejected. (Note: ASP, Brigandage, 1.11.) Thus in the following months Mayor Egidio Lauria wrote directly to the prefect of Potenza, (Note: ASP, Public Safety, Miscellany 1bis. 39, Mayor of Tursi.) who urged the subprefect in arranging for a battalion to be sent to Tursi under his orders. In reality, the sub-prefect had long had a shortage of troops, and unable to send new battalions, he could never fulfill the prefect's request. Therefore, the following year, at the further urging of the mayor, the subprefect acted differently by asking the Rotondella carabinieri, the Colobraro troops and the Tursi National Guard to cooperate with each other and organize with the mayor so as to take targeted actions against the bands. (Note: ASP, Public Security, Miscellany, 1bis. 39, Presence of brigands in the Tursi district. Subprefect's January 22 report to the Prefecture informing the Prefect of measures taken in the Tursi area.)

In the early 1900s, many young Tursi men lost their lives on the front lines during World War I. In World War II, soldiers from Tursi took part in the Italian campaign in Russia.

=== Symbols ===
==== Coat of arms ====
The tower, depicted cylindrically and with three floors, recalls that of the ancient castle and the origins around it. The sun symbolizes light and life, the two laurel branches glory and prevalence over Anglona, and the olive trees represent the wealth of the land. The website Comuni italiani describes the coat of arms thus:

Blazon of the coat of arms

Light blue in color, enclosed in golden ribbons, surmounted by a turreted crown, it bears the design of a tower with two olive trees on either side surmounted by two laurel branches with a sun above.

Blazon of the gonfalon

Blue-colored banner, charged with the coat of arms with the inscription centered in gold at the top: Municipality of Tursi, in the center is the coat of arms resting between two laurel branches tied together with a central tricolor bow, still further down persist gold decorations, the pointed metal top depicts the same design as the coat of arms, the side cords are golden.

=== Honors ===
Title of City – ribbon for ordinary uniform

Title of City
"On May 4, 2006, with Resolution No. 2, prot. 1778, for “Recognition of the Title of City,” President of the Republic Carlo Azeglio Ciampi, by decree, awarded the municipality of Tursi the honorary title of City for the historical and civic importance Tursi has had since its distant founding"

== Landmarks and places of interest ==
=== Religious architecture ===
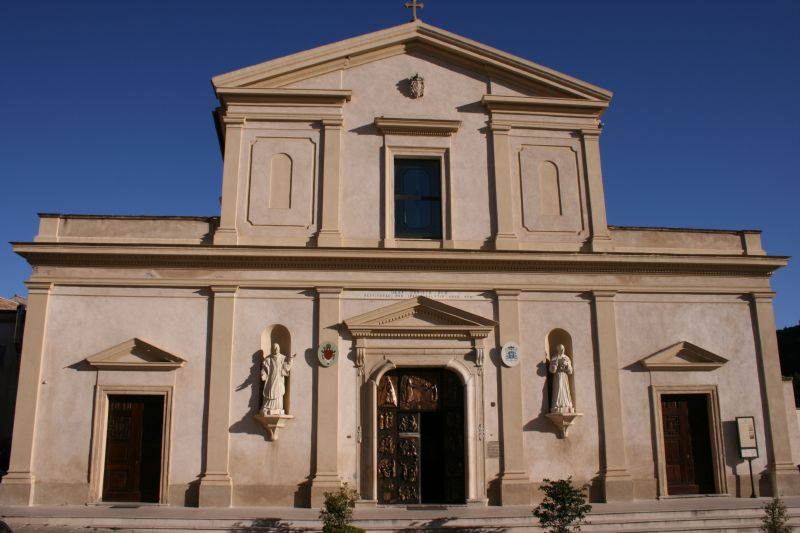
Cathedral facade.

Cathedral of the Annunziata
It is located in the center of the city, in Piazza Maria Santissima di Anglona. Dedicated to the Virgin of the Annunciation, it was erected in the 15th century by expanding a pre-existing church that still constitutes the sacristy. On August 8, 1545, by papal bull, the church was granted the title of cathedral. The building is made of load-bearing masonry in the shape of a Latin cross with three naves divided by columns with round arches. In 1718 the bell tower was rebuilt by order of Bishop Domenico Sabbatino. In 1988 the cathedral suffered a fire, attributed to an electrical short circuit, which destroyed the roof, sacristy and severely damaged the furnishings and paintings. It would take 12 years to rebuild and recover the works that were damaged in the fire. In the jubilee year of 2000, the consecration was reopened for worship.

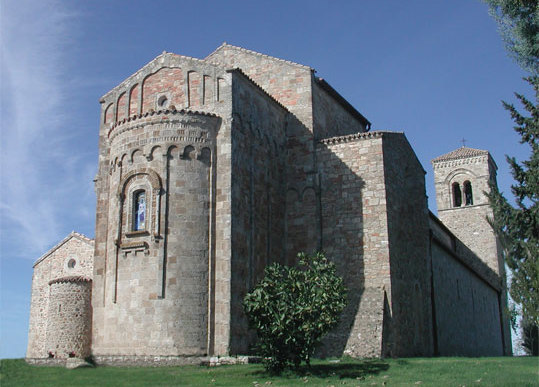
Sanctuary of Santa Maria Santissima Regina di Anglona.

Sanctuary of Santa Maria Regina di Anglona
An ancient Marian sanctuary, it stands on a hill 263 m above sea level in the hamlet of Anglona, between the Agri and Sinni rivers, halfway between Tursi and Policoro. It was built between the 11th and 12th centuries as an extension of an ancient small church, dating from the 7th-8th centuries, corresponding to the present oratory chapel. The building, made of tuff and travertine, has architectural elements such as the apse, bell tower and portal in Romanesque style. On the apse exterior one can admire carved ornaments, Lombard bands, lesenes, and on the exterior walls numerous panels with animal figures in relief of unknown provenance. In 1976 it became the titular see of the diocese of Tursi-Lagonegro. Since 1931 it has been a national monument. On May 17, 1999, the sanctuary was elevated to a minor basilica by Pope John Paul II, commemorating the synod of bishops.

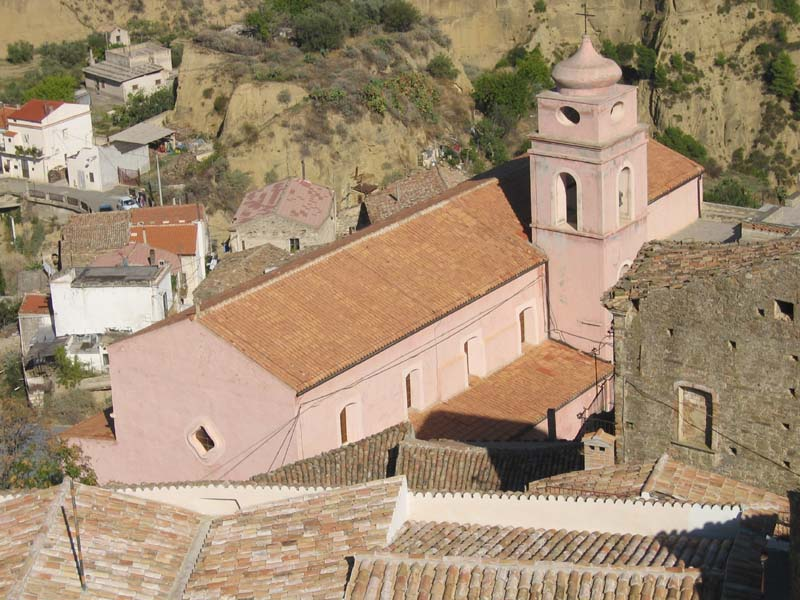
Collegiate church of Santa Maria Maggiore.

Church of Santa Maria Maggiore
It is located in the Rabatana district. Built in the 9th – 10th centuries by Basilian monks. On March 26, 1546 the bull of Pope Paul III elevated the church to a collegiate church. In the crypt of the church it is possible to admire the chapel of the De Georgiis family with frescoes by Giovanni Todisco and a stone nativity scene by Altobello Persio from the 16th century and also a 14th-century triptych depicting the Madonna and Child attributed to the master of Offida, from the Giotto school.

Church of San Filippo Neri
Built in 1661 in Baroque style, it is dedicated to the city's patron saint cult. The church is located in Plebiscito Square in the San Filippo district. The building has three naves and preserves works by Tursitan artist Francesco Oliva. St. Philip Neri was acclaimed protector of Tursi during the 17th century while the plague and cholera raged in the city. In the same years, the San Filippo oratory was built in the mid-17th century in the Petto district. The oratory building is on three levels, and in the 19th century it housed the missionary friars of St. Vincent de Paul.

Church of St. Michael the Archangel
It is located in the district of the same name and dedicated to the worship of St. Michael the Archangel. Built around the 10th century. In 1060 the synod of bishops took place there. The interior walls are adorned with paintings and sculptures by Antonio Cestone. Until August 8, 1545 it served as the cathedral of the diocese.

Other churches
Other churches include the Church of Our Lady of Graces built between the 17th and 18th centuries in Baroque style. It is located near Eraclea Street, at the foot of the historic center. It has a wide front, with three entrance doors, surmounted by a monofora. Behind the altar, an ancient wooden statue of the Madonna and Child dating from the 18th century is preserved. In the frazione of Caprarico is present the church of Maria Santissima Regina del Mondo, while in the hamlet of Panevino can be found the church of Our Lady of the Rosary.

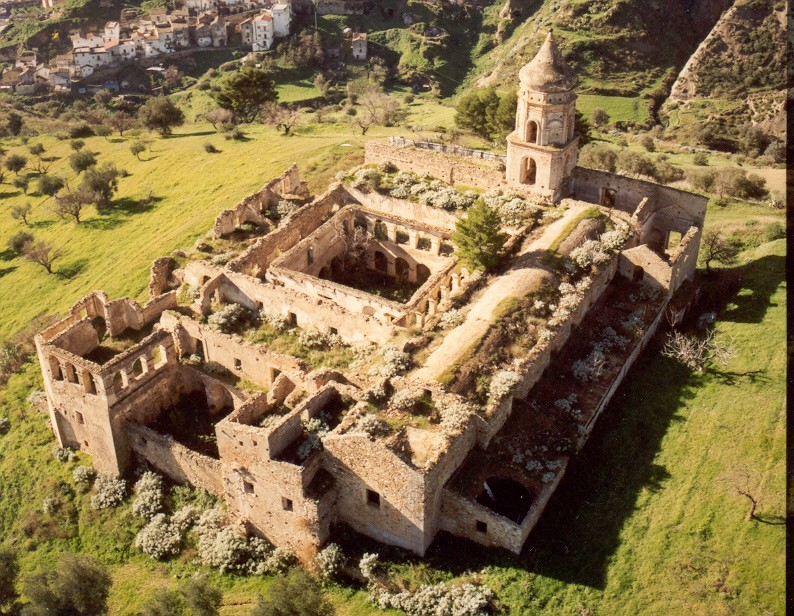
Convent of St. Francis of Assisi

Convent of St. Francis of Assisi.
The convent of St. Francis of Assisi, of the Order of Friars Minor, dates back to the first half of the 15th century, more precisely to 1441. Located on the hill of the same name, east of the town, it dominates the Santi Quaranta district. In the seventeenth century it became a seminary of liberal arts. Since its foundation it had housed a novitiate, a professorate and a philosophy studio. In 1609 the structure was expanded and enriched with a library. During the 19th century the convent fell into neglect until it was used as a cemetery in 1894. In 1914 it was permanently closed, and conversely the small church inside was used until the 1950s. Inside the small church, some ancient paintings dated 1377 were found. This suggested that the little church was pre-existing. According to other sources, however, the paintings were executed in the 16th century and depicted a miraculous event that occurred in 1377. In 1991 it was declared a national monument by Minister Ferdinando Facchiano.

Convent of San Rocco
The convent of Saint Roch, of the Order of Friars Minor Capuchin, dates back to the late 16th century, more precisely to 1589 and is located on the hill of the same name west of the town. In the 1990s Bishop Rocco Talucci granted the use of the convent to Don Antonio Mazzi's Exodus Onlus Foundation for the rehabilitation of drug addicts. The foundation's youths, from all over Italy, have upgraded the convent and improved the surrounding area. On August 16, on the feast day of the saint, it is customary to go to the convent to hear the service and have a procession around the convent grounds.

=== Civil architecture ===
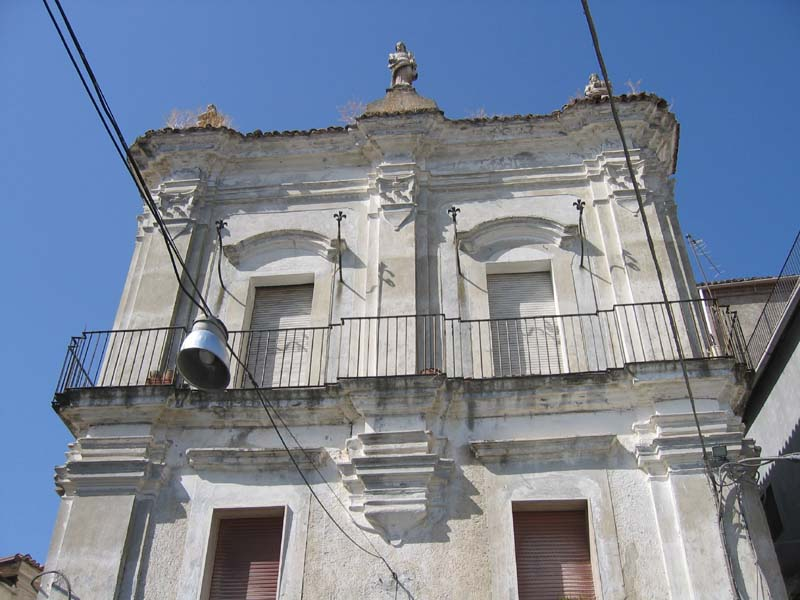
Palace of Baron Brancalasso.

Brancalasso Palace
Baron Brancalasso's palace, simply called “Baron's Palace,” is located in the center of Plebiscito Square, in the San Filippo district, its construction is veiled in a hint of mystery. An ancient legend has it that the palace was built in a single night by demons and spirits of the underworld, who, unable to return to their realm in time, materialized at dawn light on the roof of the building in the form of statues. In one night the perimeter of the building was marked out, the construction of which was opposed by the owners of neighboring land. The three statues placed on it symbolize justice, peace and charity.

Latronico Palace
It is located in the historic center, in the San Michele district, and is probably the largest palace in Tursi and has a large atrium with internal stone steps and a characteristic belvedere tower. The palace was inhabited by the Latronico family until the 1960s.

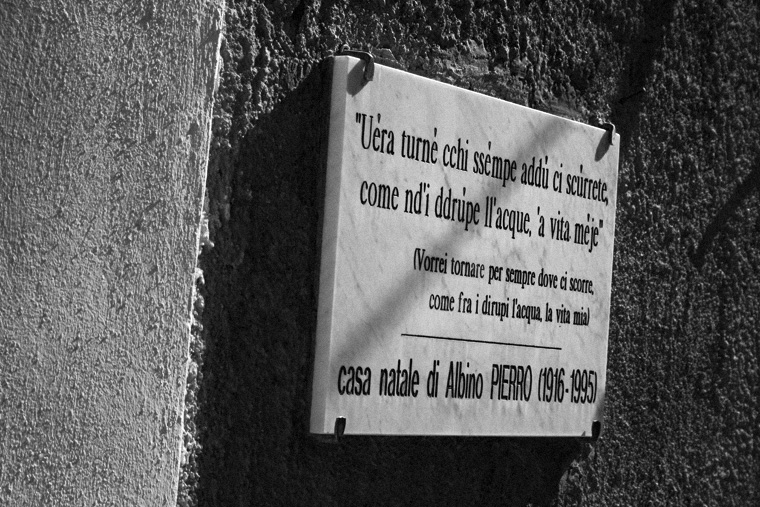
Plaque on the Pierro Palace.

Pierro Palace
It was the home of poet Albino Pierro, built in the San Michele district. The dwelling named by the poet, in his poems, 'U Paazze is a building consisting of a basement and two floors in elevation. It boasts a wide panorama from the Pescogrosso stream to the convent of San Francesco up to the cliffs of the Rabatana district. These places were of great inspiration to the poet. After Pierro's death, the house was used, on the upper floors, as the “Pierro Library” where many of the books used by the poet and all the original works are kept. This mansion is a destination for tourists and scholars since in addition to the library, it also houses the “Albino Pierro Literary Park.” The marble plaque installed by the municipality after the poet's death bears a quote from the epigraph of the work Ci uéra turnè.

Uèra turnè cchi ssèmpe addu' ci scùrrete,
come nd'i ddrùpe ll'acque, 'a vita mèje

— Epigraph on the birthplace of Albino Pierro

I want to return forever to where it flows,
like the water between the cliffs, my life.

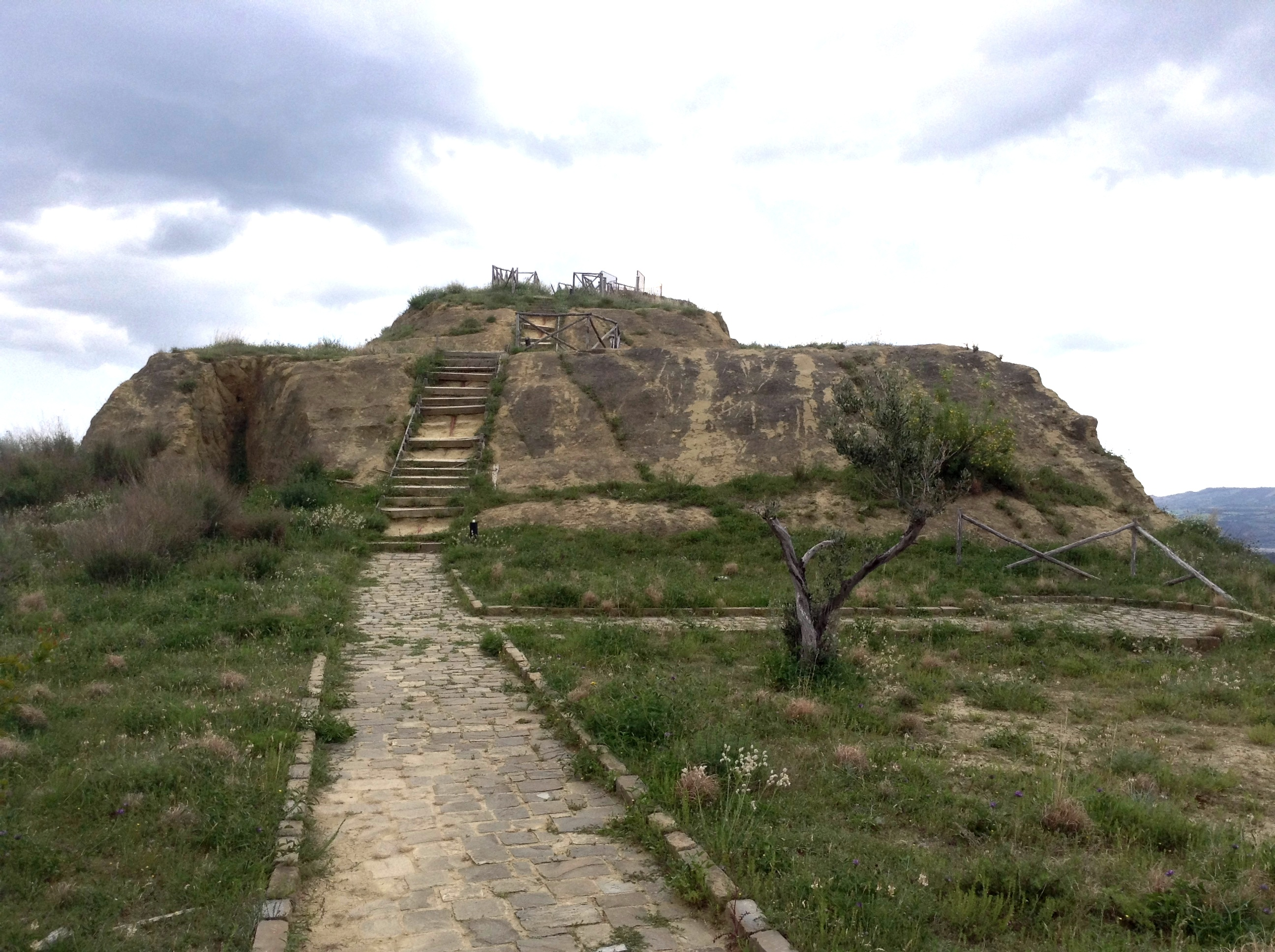
External remains of one of the castle towers.

Other palaces
Other palaces include Palazzo Basile, identified by its large arched doorway that leads into a large atrium. Palazzo Guida has the distinction of having a solid wooden doorway surmounted by an arch with the family crest. Palazzo Ginnari can be identified by a wide flight of steps.

=== Military architecture ===
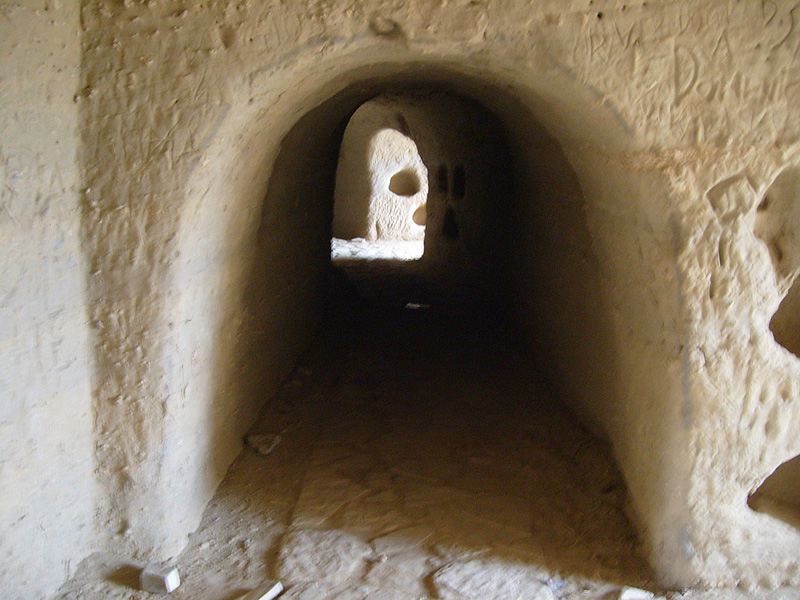
Remains of the castle's basement.

Castle
Built by the Goths around the 5th century to defend the territory, it is situated on a hill 346 m above sea level, naturally defended by three chasms, more than a hundred meters in length, originating from landslides; the "Palmara ditch" (a Iaramma) to the north, the "St. Francis ditch" (u fòss d'San Francisch) to the east and the "Cathedral ditch" (u fòss da Catr'dé) to the west. Today only the remains of what was once a Gothic castle remain, some parts, however, such as the underground passages, remained intact until the early twentieth century. Archaeological excavations in Contrada Castello have brought to light skeletons, tombs, coins, fragments of amphorae and lead ogival balls bearing the inscriptions EIETHIDE (Greek) and APNIA (Latin), these works are currently on display in the National Archaeological Museum of the Siritide in Policoro. Deeds from 1553 between the city of Tursi and Marquis Galeazzo Pinelli show that the castle was inhabited until the 16th century and that it measured 400 palms long and 200 wide, with an area of 20,000 square palms, of which 15,000 were used for a garden, cellars and cisterns, and the remaining 5,000 for a comfortable dwelling. It was built on two floors and had two three-story cylindrical towers. Inside the walls were a garden, cellars, some cisterns and comfortable dwellings for the barons; the entrance was regulated by a drawbridge. It was home to numerous lords, princes and marquises, but during times of war it became a fortress. An old tradition has it that there was a tunnel between the church of Santa Maria Maggiore in the Rabatana district and the castle, which was supposed to allow the lords to go to church undisturbed.

=== Other architecture ===
Squares
Among the town's main squares is Piazza Maria Santissima di Anglona, built in 1951 by the Matera civil engineers, originally as a consolidation of the stream bank, it forms the current town center. It houses the Cathedral of the Annunziata, the diocesan chancery, the town hall and the war memorial. It borders and incorporates the cathedral square, the covered market square, the monument square built in 1955 to honor the fallen soldiers and the terrace square on Pescogrosso built in 2001. In the historical part, San Filippo district features Plebiscito Square, considered the old town center until the 1960s. The square is overlooked by the church of the city's patron saint, St. Philip, and the Brancalasso Palace.

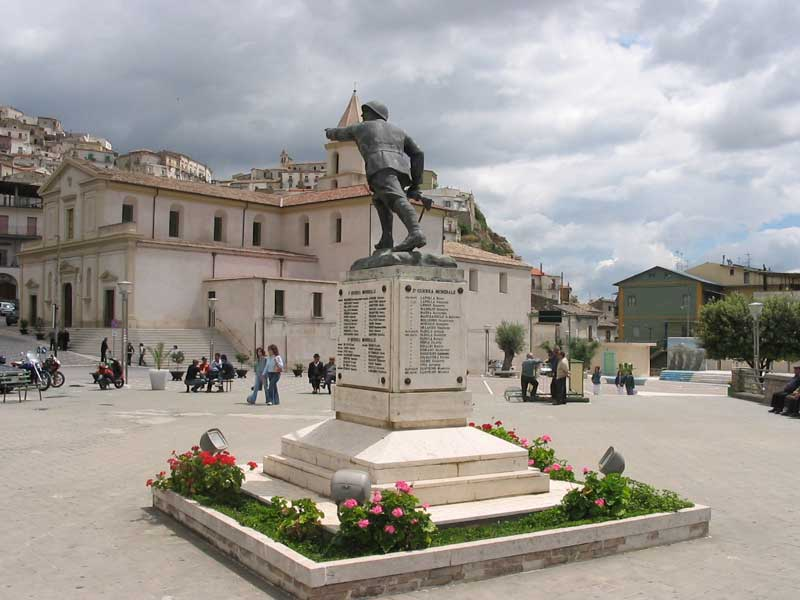
Monument dedicated to the fallen for the homeland.

Monument to the fallen
The city of Tursi contributed many men during World War I and World War II, and it was in honor of the fallen Tursitans that the city administration, led by then-mayor Armando Di Noia, erected the monument. The war memorial is located in Monument Square and was built in 1970. On the sides of the marble memorial stone read the names of the fallen soldiers on the front and the following inscription:

Our dead for the fatherland are not absent, they are the invisible ones, who look with their eyes full of glory into ours, which are full of tears.

— Tursi, TO ITS FALLEN, 1970

=== Archaeological sites ===
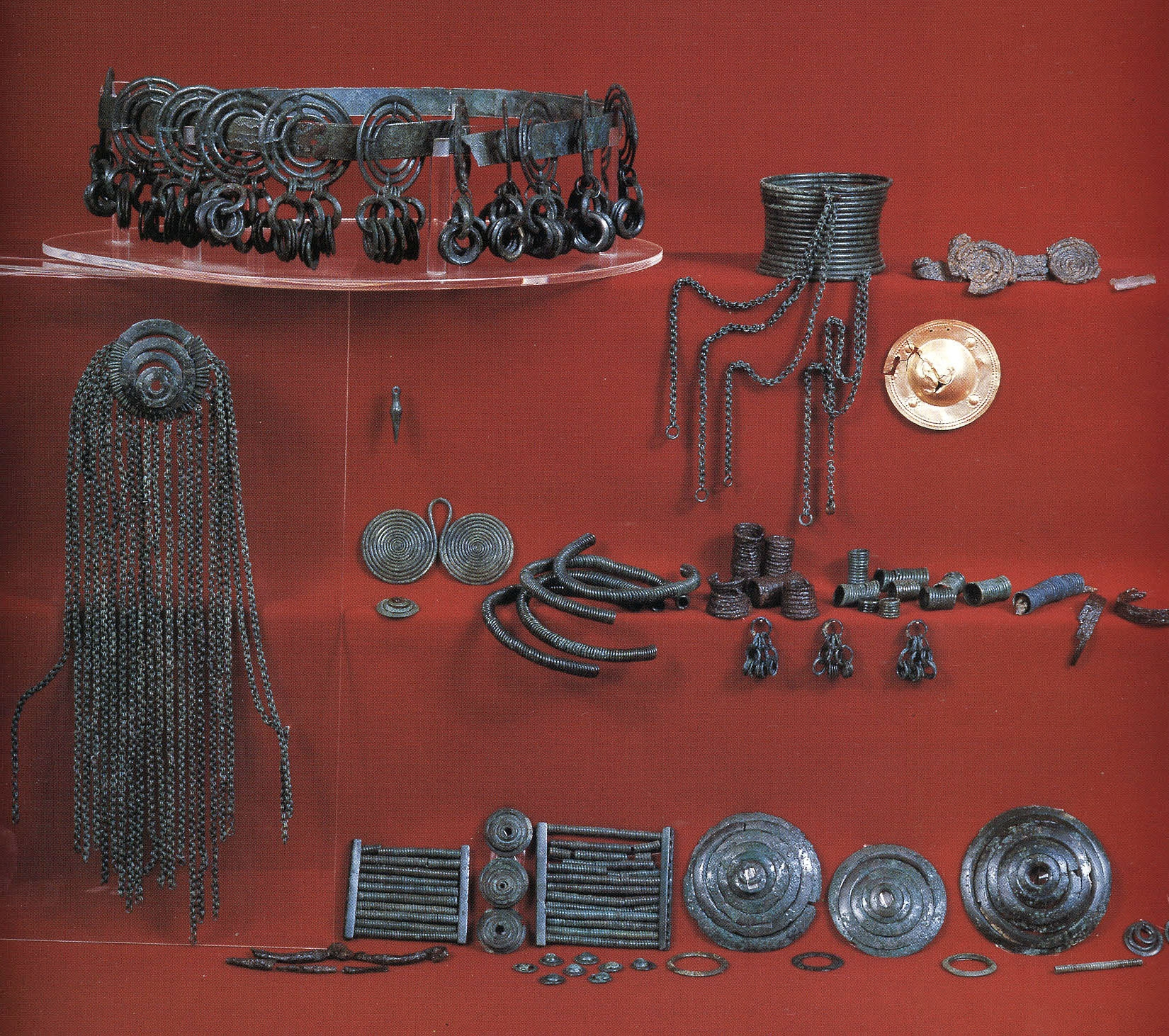
Funerary set from the 15th century B.C. found at the Sorigliano Valley site.

Sorigliano Valley
The Valle Sorigliano archaeological site located near Anglona has unearthed an entire necropolis dated to the Iron Age. Particularly in tomb 31, 2 chisels, an axe, a bronze axe and a large iron scythe with a bronze handle that was 44 cm long were found, indicating that the population was engaged in wars on the one hand and in the management of economic activities on the other. In the same area, other tombs dating to the first half of the 8th century B.C. were discovered, and some Hellenistic and Roman necropolises, which contained valuable grave goods.

Anglona
The archaeological site located near Anglona unearthed an acropolis of Byzantine origin, which was allegedly built on the ruins of the ancient city of Pandosia. On the hill and at the foot of the northern slope, in the Conca d'oro area, busts of the goddess Demeter and statuettes of the winged Sphinx were found. In one tomb were found: a necklace of glass paste, several rings, two earrings with gold pyramid pendants of Tarentine style, an amphora and two bowls decorated with palmettes, which belonged to a young woman. Such grave goods date the tomb, with some approximation, to the 3rd century BC. The gold and silver coins found in the lower layers of the rural sanctuary dedicated to the cult of Demeter date to the mid-4th century BC.

Cozzo San Martino
The archaeological site of Cozzo San Martino is located in the surrounding area of the municipality, south of the castle. Some Bronze Age artifacts have been found in a necropolis.

Contrada Castello
The site located near the castle where an acropolis formed on a rocky spur of sands dating from the Middle Bronze Age has been found. Archaeological excavations near the remains of the Gothic castle of Tursi have unearthed skeletons, tombs, coins, fragments of amphorae and lead ogival balls bearing the inscriptions EYHfIDA (Greek) and APNIA (Latin), the latter of which were used as throwing weapons during a siege of the castle.

== Society ==
=== Demographic development ===
The municipality, as of December 31, 2021, has 4 753 inhabitants distributed as follows: 2 384 males and 2 369 females. There are 2 214 households, and the average number of members per household is 2.15 (slightly lower than the national average of 2.5, and perfectly average with the similar regional value).

The municipality, in recent decades, has experienced, like many municipalities in the south of Italy, a slight and constant decrease in population due mainly to the constant decrease in the birth rate, one of the main causes of the negative value on the town's growth rate. Many young people decide to seek work or to perfect their university studies outside the country's borders, and once they graduate they hardly find a labor market capable of absorbing specialized professional positions.

The demographic evolution of the municipality is much broader. As early as 1277 there were 1,440 inhabitants (240 fires) until the peak of the population boom in 1561 when there were 10,788 inhabitants (1,798 fires), and then had a slow and steady decline until 1853 when there were 3,538 inhabitants.

=== Ethnic groups and foreign minorities ===
ISTAT data as of December 31, 2021 note a resident foreign population of 432 of whom 234 are male and 198 are female. Foreign citizenship accounts for 9.08% of the resident population. The most represented communities are Albania with 195 people, accounting for 4.1% of the resident population and 45.12% of the resident foreign population; and Romania with 142 people, accounting for 2.99% on the resident population and 32.87% of the resident foreign population.

=== Languages and dialects ===
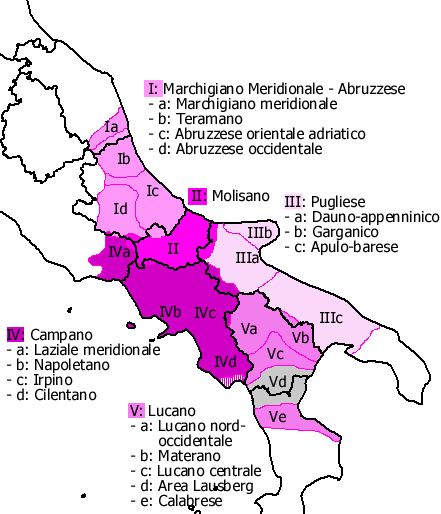
Dialect of the “Central Lucanian” area in the system of southern intermediate dialects.

That of Tursi, my village in the province of Matera,
was one of the many languages destined to disappear.
I had to look for ways to fix on paper the sounds of my people.

— Albino Pierro in A terra d'u ricorde (The land of remembrance)

The dialect spoken in Tursi is included in the system of intermediate southern dialects specifically in the area of Lucanian dialects. However, the municipal territory turns out to fall within the linguistic area of the Metaponto plain. Tursi's main linguistic differences are evidenced by a phonetic diversity due to the transformation of the a vowel into e within words and the s-termination of many others, such as: vèv ala chès (I'm going home), quànn tòrns? (when are you coming back?), lass'm stè (leave me alone).

Among the major Tursitan dialect exponents are the poets Vincenzo Cristiano and Albino Pierro, the latter of whom was nominated several times for the Nobel Prize in Literature. Pierro's poems have been translated into more than 13 languages so it was necessary to publish a dictionary of Tursitanian-Italian lexicon.

=== Religion ===
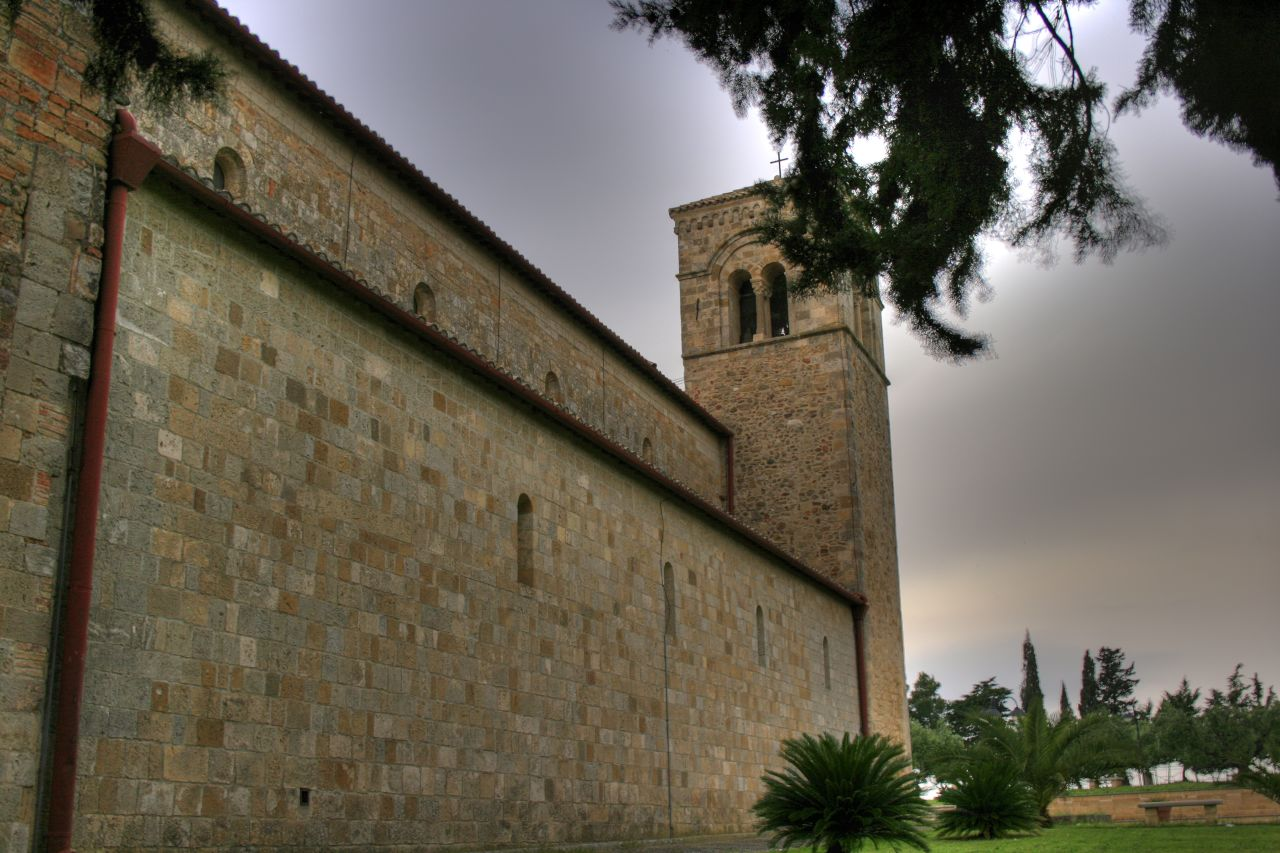
Basilica of Anglona, titular see of the diocese.

In 968 the bishopric was established in Tursi, and until the beginning of the 12th century the diocese adopted the Byzantine rite. In 1110 the bishopric of Tursi was transferred to Anglona, because it was better placed strategically and because of the presence, on the hill, of a particularly important religious building, the sanctuary of Santa Maria Regina di Anglona. The diocese assumed the name of Diocese of Anglona. Later, with the decline of the city of Anglona and the development of Tursi, Pope Paul III, in order to settle disputes between the diocesan chancery and the baronial chamber, by consistory decree of August 8, 1545, directed to Bishop Berardino Elvino, sanctioned the transfer of the bishopric of Anglona to the city of Tursi. The seat of the cathedra was the church of St. Michael the Archangel; eight months later, the same pontiff, with the bull of March 26, 1546, definitively transferred the episcopal cathedra to Tursi, in the church of the Annunziata, and ordered the bishops to maintain the title of the diocese of Anglona-Tursi.

On September 8, 1976, following the creation of the Basilicata ecclesiastical region it assumed the name of the Diocese of Tursi-Lagonegro. Anglona, however, became titular see of a diocese. Its first titular bishop from 1977 to 1991 was Andrea Cordero Lanza di Montezemolo who later became a cardinal.

The diocese has 82 parishes and an area of 2509 km². In 2014 it had 127,100 baptized people out of 128,200 inhabitants, or 99.1 percent baptized of the total population.

=== Traditions and folklore ===
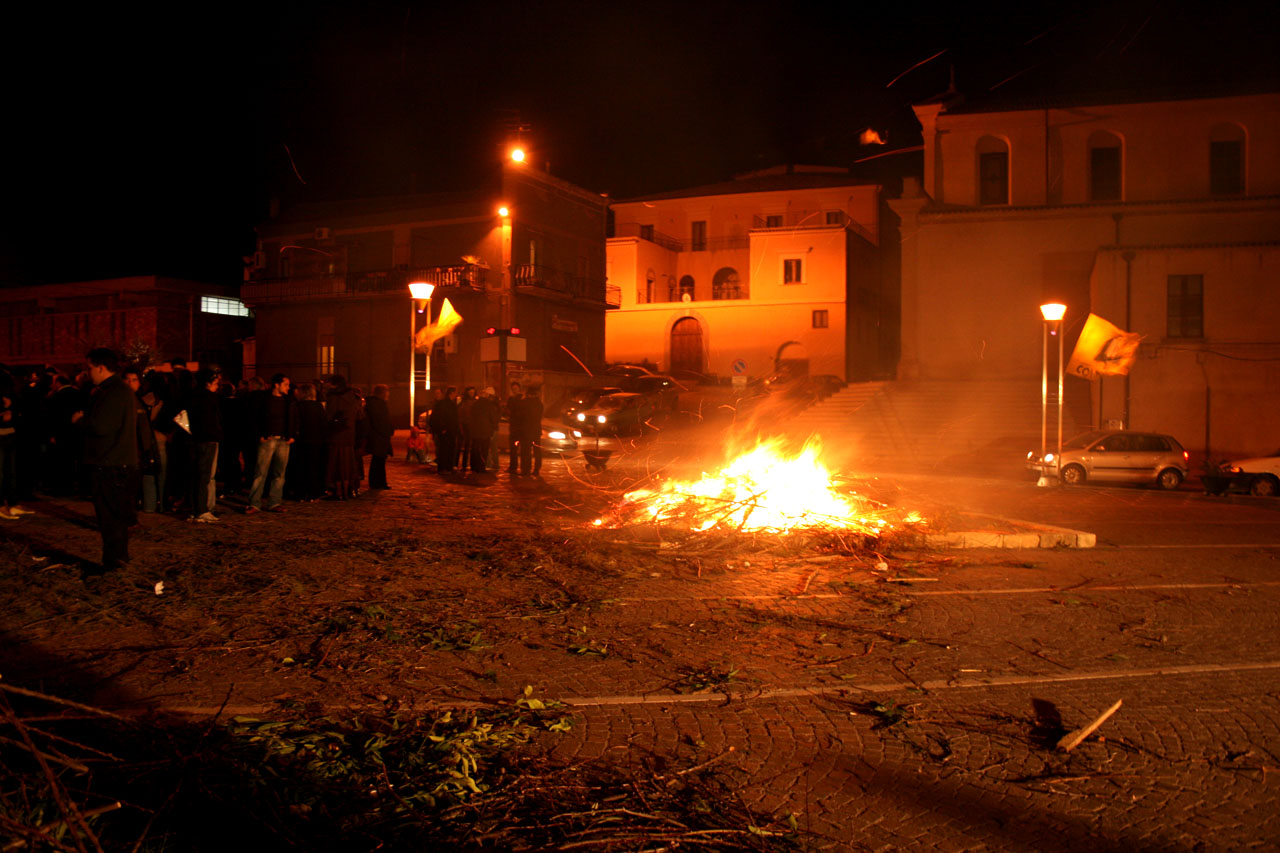
U umnnàrie, the bonfire of St. Joseph, at the end of the evening.

Many Tursitan traditions are based on religious events. The best known is the Feast of Our Lady of Anglona, which occurs every September 8. On the Sunday after Easter, however, the 18th-century statue depicting the Madonna is carried on the shoulders for a distance of more than 10 kilometers, from the sanctuary of Anglona to the Cathedral of the Annunziata in Tursi, and on May 1 on the reverse route. The patronal feast dedicated to St. Philip Neri falls on May 26.

On the evening of March 18, it is traditional to burn branches, thus creating large bonfires. Locals call the event u umnnàrie referring to the bonfire of St. Joseph.

At Christmas time, since the 1970s, a living nativity scene is set up in the alleys of the Rabatana district.

== Culture ==
=== Education ===
==== Libraries ====
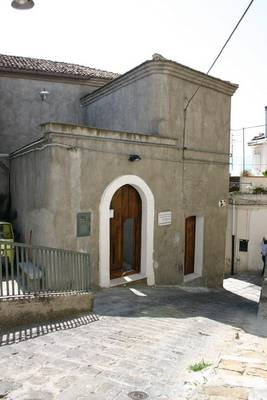
Palazzo Pierro, in the San Michele district, home to the library and literary park of the same name.

The municipal library has a bibliographic collection of about 3,300 volumes and pamphlets, with a section devoted to the history of the area. Founded in 1970, it is located in a complex of the facility that houses the secondary school. Older is the bishop's library, founded in 1800 and located in the center of town, in the 17th-century building of the diocesan chancery. It has more than 2,000 ancient texts, including medieval and Renaissance manuscripts on the history of the territory and the diocese. Finally, in the historic center, located at the Pierro Palace, is the “A. Pierro” library and literary park, where many of the books used by the poet Albino Pierro in his years of life and the entire collection of his original works are located.

==== Schools ====
In the city, in the Santi Quaranta district, there is the ITCG “Manlio Capitolo” (Technical Commercial Institute for Surveyors and Tourism Technicians). In the Sant'Anna ward there is also a Vocational Institute. Meanwhile, in Via Roma there is the Istituto Comprensivo Statale "Albino Pierro" including all first and lower secondary schools.

==== Museums ====
The National Archaeological Museum of the Siritide in Policoro houses and exhibits numerous findings from the Tursitan territory. In the second section of the museum, focused on the Bronze Age, it is possible to find a funerary set from Pandosia found near Anglona, while in the fifth section it is possible to find Iron Age remains belonging to Oenotrian and Lucanian peoples.

=== Cinema ===
In Tursi in 2007 many scenes of the film Modo armonico semplice, directed by Salvatore Verde, were shot, and in Rabatana, some scenes of Nine Poems in Basilicata, directed by Antonello Faretta with John Giorno. Landscapes and parts of the area are also present in Imma Tataranni: Deputy Prosecutor broadcast from 2019 on Rai 1.

=== Cuisine ===
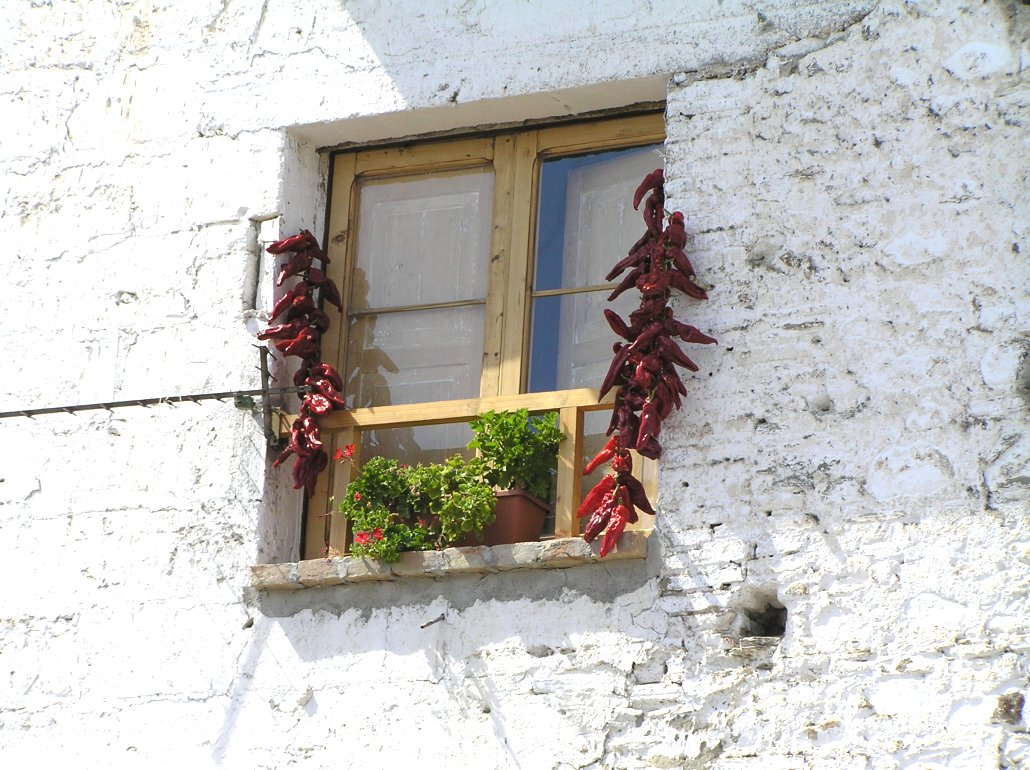
Pupàcce crusk (crispy peppers), hung outside the window to dry in a Rabatana house.

The cuisine was influenced by poverty and peasant life. Therefore originally bread was homemade. To this day, many local bakeries still make homemade bread and for this reason the following are found: a pitta (a kind of flat wheel) and u piccillète (a kind of white doughnut in the shape of a steering wheel), among the flatbreads are found a caccallèt which can be sweet, with raisins, and salty with cracklings. The classic focaccia is vulgarly called vruscète and is generally topped with tomatoes and peppers. On winter evenings, ffella-rusch is eaten in front of the hearth, a slice of bread toasted over the fire and seasoned with lard or a drizzle of oil, salt and pupàcce pisèt (ground bell pepper), made by grinding pupàcce crusk (dried, crispy peppers).

The most typical dish is frizzuli ca' millica or maccaruni ca' millica, that is, macaroni made with a square-section iron (from a stocking or umbrella) and seasoned with tomato sauce and fried bread crumbs. Among the first courses there are also raskatelle pupàcce e pummidòre, cavatelli pasta with tomato sauce and fresh peppers.

When the pig was killed, nothing was lost, starting with the blood that was used for the preparation of sanguinaccio. The less noble parts, such as pork rinds, lard, and innards were used in the preparation of frittole (cracklings) and nnuglia, which was called pezzente salami since it was made from meat scraps. These foods are mainly used as side dishes, or cooked together with vegetables, in the preparation of minestra maritata.

After pork, the most widely consumed meat was sheep meat, which was used in the preparation of Gghiommaricchie, rolls of innards usually made over charcoal or baked in a pan with potatoes. At Easter time it is customary to make cavzòn (typical calzones stuffed with sausage, or vegetables or potatoes), while at Christmas time people prepare crispelle (soft doughnuts made of leavened dough and fried in plenty of oil, or fried panzerottini stuffed with dried peppers and anchovies), panzèrott e uand (fried panzerottini stuffed with chickpea cream, and chiacchiere-type sweets). Among the wines are Matera DOC.

Other typical Tursitan dishes include: cicorjè e fèv – chicory and fava beans, finucch' e fasul – fennel and bean soup, mugnèm chièn – stuffed eggplant, pastùrej – stewed sheep, raskatelle ca' millica – homemade pasta (cavatelli) seasoned with tomato sauce and fried bread crumbs, snail soup, orange salad.

== Anthropogenic geography ==
=== Urbanism ===
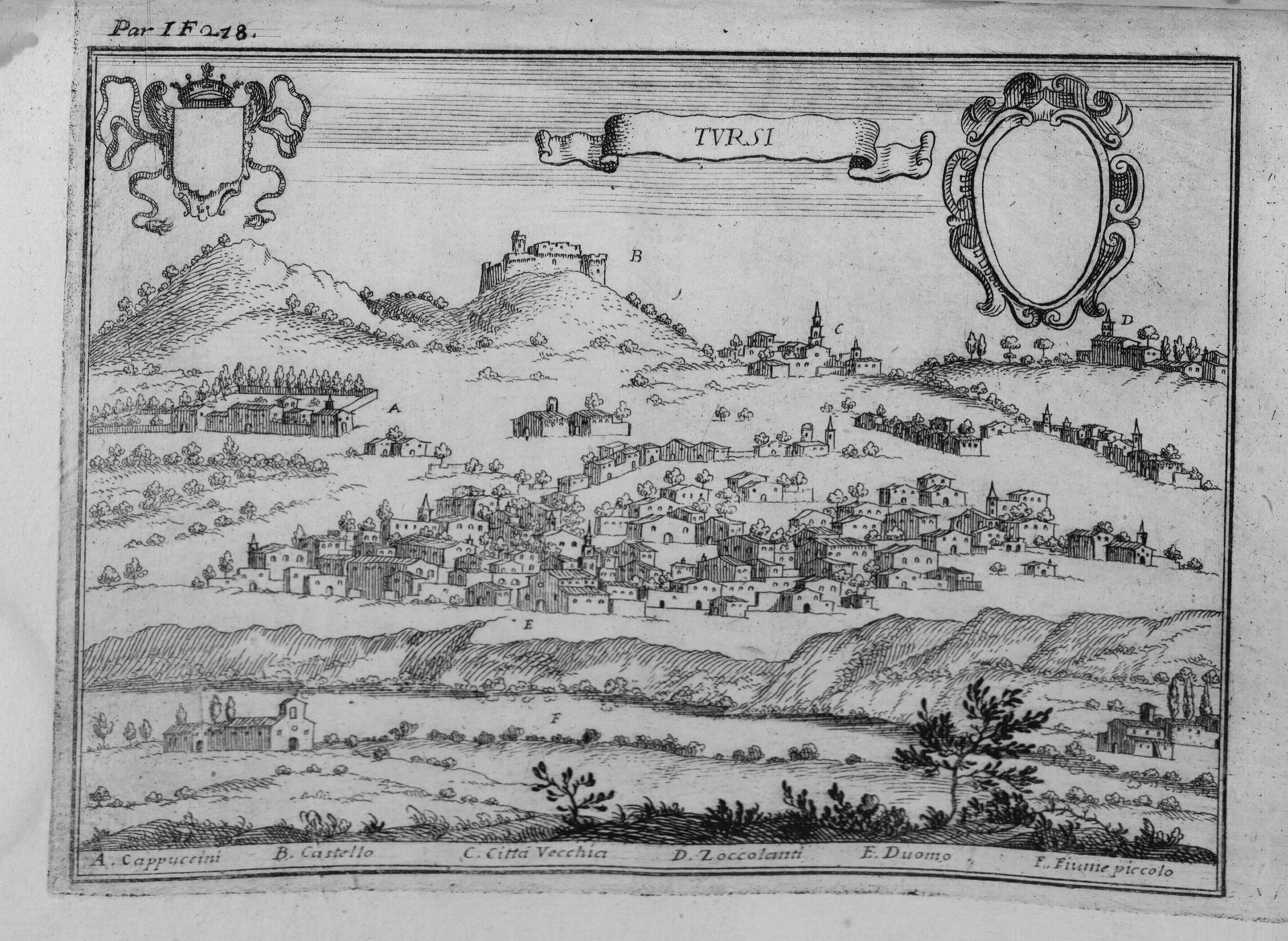
Illustration of the city of Tursi made by Francesco Cassiano De Silva between 1698–1702.

The first settlements in the territory of Tursi date back to the Early Iron Age, ascertained by archaeological excavations near the hamlet of Anglona. Later, in the same area, the city of Pandosia developed between the 15th century B.C. and the 7th century B.C., due first to the Oenotrians and then to the Ionians.

The present historic city core would be built many centuries later, when in 410 the Visigoths settled on the hill where they built a tower to better control the surrounding valleys. Sacking the neighboring villages, the surviving inhabitants took refuge around the castle, giving rise to the city's first inhabited suburb. Only four hundred years later, however, did the early suburb take its present form. Under Saracen rule the township would take the name Rabatana and the Arab-Muslim urban planning style that still differentiates it from the rest of the city. In the following centuries, there would be a slight Byzantine and Norman influence in the castle and the new dwellings, which would force the township to expand toward the valley below, creating a clear distinction within the village. This division was clearly visible both from an urbanistic side, from an “upper town” and a “lower town,” and from a socio-political side, due to the presence of a chamberlain of the Rabatana.

The primordial core located to the east of the castle as a rupestrian settlement evolved with the construction of a ribât under Saracen rule, maintaining its rupestrian facies to which connotations of Arab culture were added in the typology and organization of the urban fabric, the road network, and water channelization techniques. The urban agglomeration of the Rabatana, centered around the collegiate church of Santa Maria Maggiore with the hospital of Santa Maria Maddalena was equipped with labyrinthine and compact streets alternating steep slopes with sketchy plateaus and was articulated in the small districts that constituted a concentration of palatial domus. The village, as attested by a papal bull of Paul III in 1545, appeared to be divided into three main zones in conjunction with the three most important churches in the town: La Rabatana, with the church of Santa Maria Maggiore, appeared to be the highest part of the inhabited area, which included the castle and the hamlet around the church, known as the Massitani. Immediately below, connected to the previous one by an impervious mule track, was built the church of St. Michael the Archangel with the hamlet around it, which would take the name of the church itself. Finally, in the lower part was located the cathedral. The first connection between the Rabatana and the rest of the village, strongly desired by Duke Carlo Doria, was a huge stone staircase, called petrizza and still in use today, built in 1594 that replaced the previous impervious mule track.

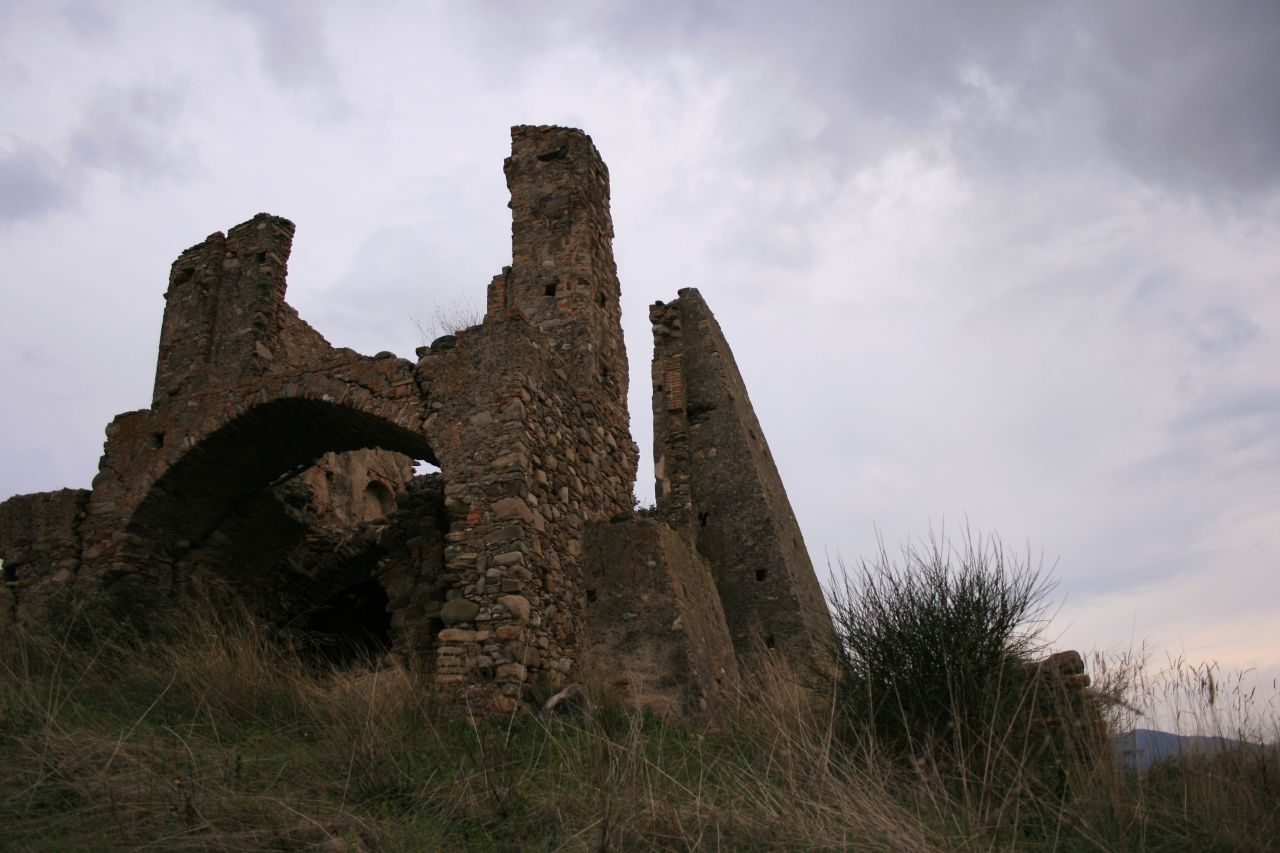
Ruins of an old mill, along the course of the Pescogrosso stream.

The "upper town" was naturally defended by very steep overhangs, the petti, further strengthened by fortified structures connected to the castle, specifically the two drawbridges ("di suso" and "di mezo") that converged to the respective town gates ("porta di suso" or "Santo Biaso" and "porta de la mendola"). The “lower town,” characterized by the more widespread presence of elevated buildings, was articulated among numerous districts strongly integrated into the surrounding natural environment with domus and farmhouses nestled among vineyards and olive groves and with the presence of varied mills near streams. The town, as a whole, has a varied building typology ranging from domus seu gripta and gripta cum planitie ante, rupestrian-type dwellings for the humbler classes, to domus terranee, seu catogi, half-buried in the rock and consisting of a single multi-purpose room, to domus cum cammera terragna, housing units of the middle class, to the domus seu lamia terranea, made of masonry, to the domus mezane, elevated to ground level, to the domus suprane, with external stairs, to the more articulated domus palaziate, for the upper classes, adorned with vegetable gardens and gardens and located around religious buildings.

The illustration made by De Silva outlines the view of Tursi from Mount San Martino at 324 m a.s.l., on the right bank of the Pescogrosso creek, and shows how the nucleus developed in pre-Norman times due mainly to historical, morphological and demographic factors, centered around the castle according to a process of encastellation, and expanded successively, especially between the 15th and 16th centuries without any planimetric regularity, but simply to crown the cathedral consolidating a modern forma urbis and gradually marginalizing itself from the historic core. The view predominantly captures the agricultural character of the city, as was the case for many Lucanian centers of the modern age, specifically, Tursitan rurality is revealed in the distribution of the neighborhoods, among which citrus groves, vegetable gardens and fields for small-scale grazing open up. In the gradual populating of the countryside with the scattered suburban residences, small chapels and churches were then built there. In this evolutionary context, towards the end of the sixteenth century, with the loss of the military functions that had qualified the Middle Ages and the gradual transformation of Tursi into a rural area, the ancient castle of pre-Norman layout became increasingly marginal to the town, which with its cylindrical towers at the corners of the ramparts, which had had a prominent function in the Aragonese period and in the viceregal period of the Kingdom of Naples, by the end of the seventeenth century now stands solitary on the natural sandstone cliff.

In the following centuries the urbanization of the settlement continued gradually toward the valley, developing according to master plans, until it reached the present settlement.

=== Historical subdivisions ===
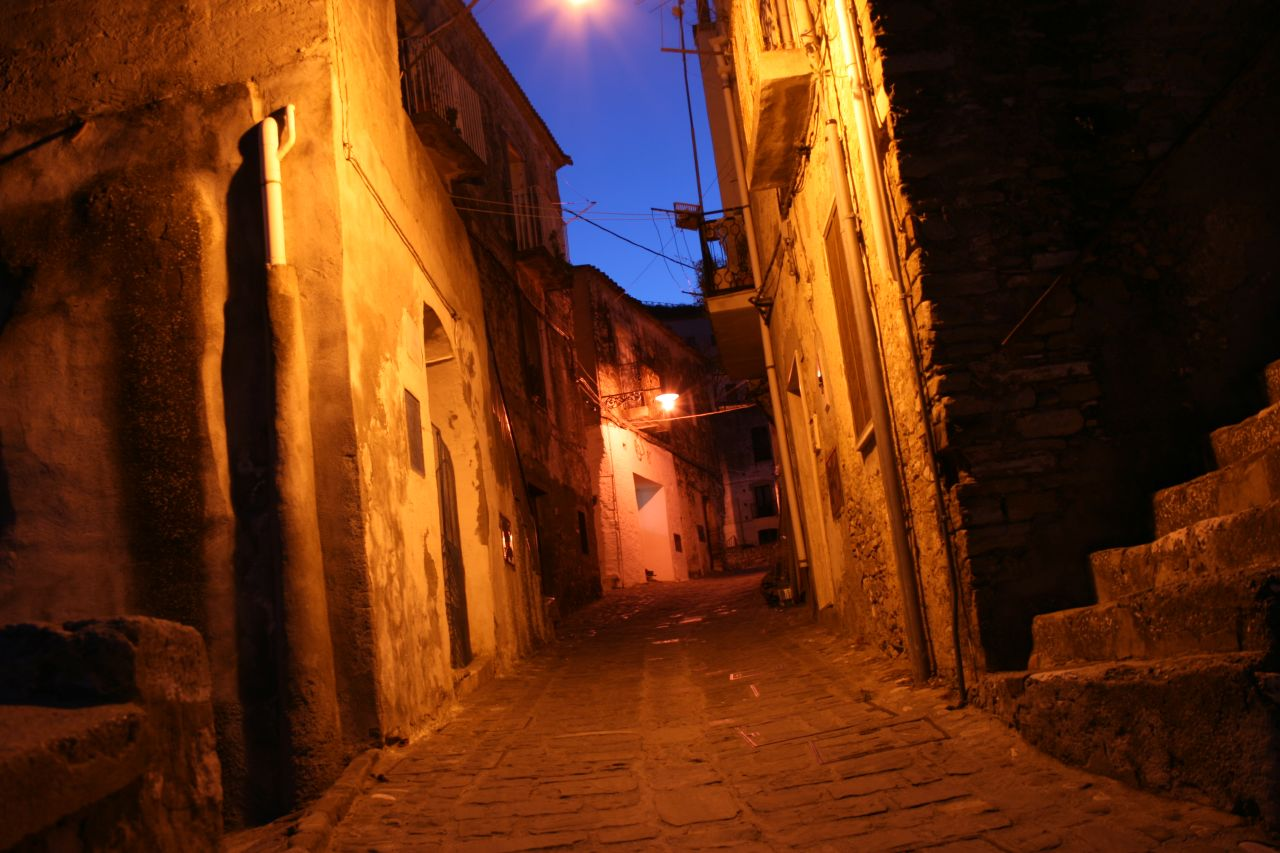
Alleys of the San Filippo district.

The town is divided into several rioni, many of which are named after a related church or convent. In the most historic part of the city are counted the rioni Rabatana, San Michele, San Filippo, Petto and Cattedrale built between the 10th and 17th centuries, the remainder, however, are of contemporary construction.

Among the most historic are Rabatana, which was the first inhabited ward of Tursi. Rising in the highest part of the city, around the castle, in the 5th century, it was built at a strategic point for the control of the valleys below (Sinni valley and Agri valley). The rione still stands almost apart from the rest of the town, connected only by the "petrizza." In the rione are the remains of the castle and the collegiate church of Santa Maria Maggiore. To the south, after the “petrizza” is the rione San Michele, named after the church of the same name, and built around the 10th century. As a structure very similar to the previous one, it has houses leaning on each other and narrow streets built of stone. The district contains the Latronico Palace, one of the largest palaces in Tursi, the church of San Michele, former cathedral of the diocese, and the birthplace of the poet Albino Pierro, now used as a library and literary park. Going further down the valley to the south is the San Filippo district, which also takes its name from the church of the same name. Built around the 17th century, until the 1960s it was the center of the town and had all the public offices later moved to the present town center. This ward features Plebiscito Square, Brancalasso Palace and the church of San Filippo dedicated to the worship of the patron saint. The alleys, similar to the previous wards, are made of stone and mostly, narrow and steep. The Petto or Pandosia ward built to the east of the previous one, takes its name from the extreme steepness of its alleys. The houses of the ward lean on each other and almost cling to the steep gable below. The Petto connects the San Filippo ward to the newer Santi Quaranta ward. The Cathedral ward, named for the presence of the cathedral, is built to the south of the San Filippo ward and effectively encompasses Catuba, a west-facing area, and Vallone, the lower and central area of the city. The ward contains the Cathedral of the Annunziata and the diocesan chancery building, which overlook Piazza Maria Santissima di Anglona, the current center of the city. The southern part of the square is also overlooked by the present town hall and the war memorial.

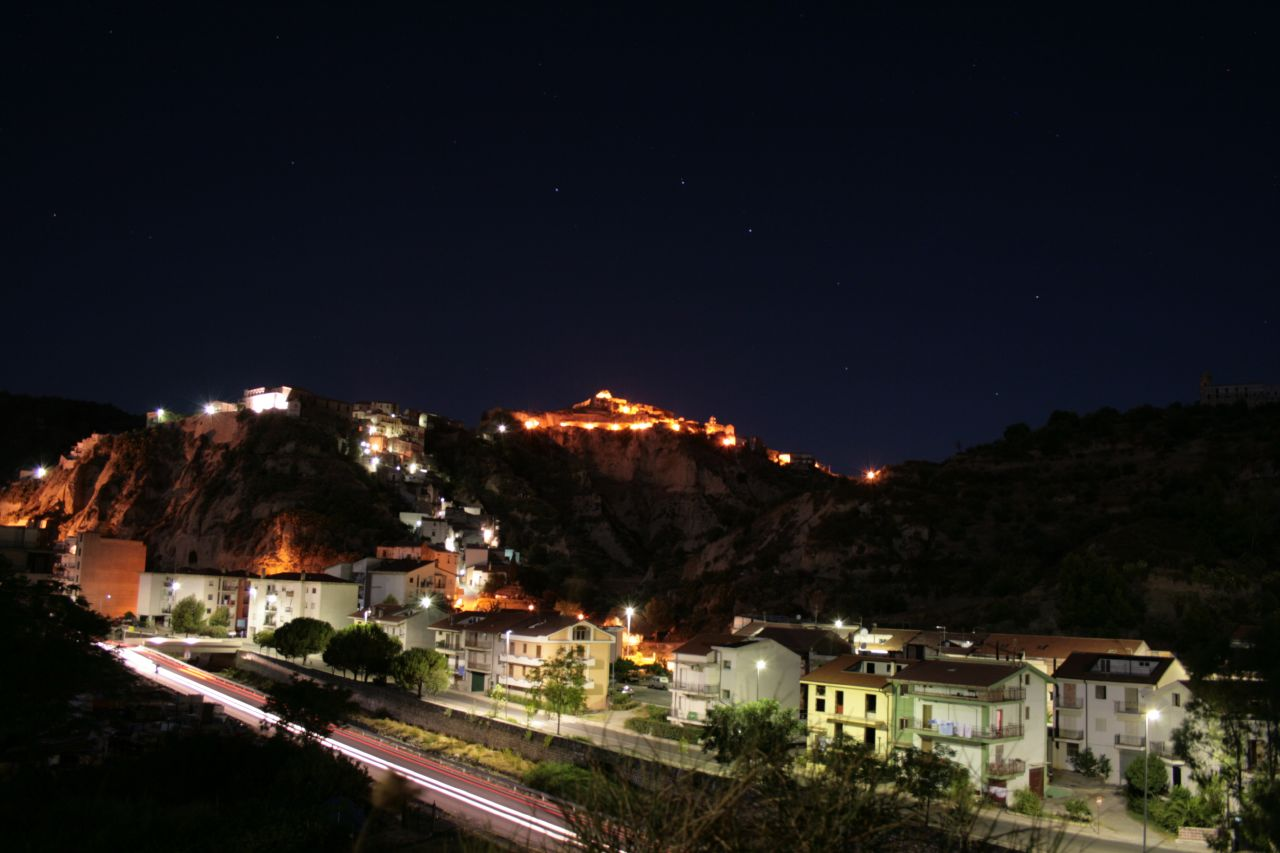
Part of the Santi Quaranta ward below, one can also glimpse the Rabatana ward above and the Petto ward connecting the two.

Outside the most historic part of the city is the Costa ward, built to the west of the previous ward. It arises at the foot of the hill on which the former convent of Saint Roch stands out, and takes its name from the location where it arose, slightly hilly, with an upward slope. It is separated horizontally from the Piana district by the main avenue known as Via Roma. Along the avenue stand the middle school and elementary school. The Piana or Europa rione was built at the same time as the Costa rione, and retains the same structure of houses, built mainly of tuff, and streets, paved with sett-type stone slabs. It rises along the right bank of the Pescogrosso stream. It takes the name Europa from its streets named after European states and the name Piana because it arose in an extremely flat area. In 1983, the Pescogrosso overflowed and many homes suffered severe damage, only later were levees built to the creek. The Sant'Anna ward was built in the early 1970s along the left bank of the Pescogrosso creek. It was named after the old St. Anne convent, a structure later used as a vocational institute. The Santi Quaranta ward is the most recent in the city, and construction began in the late 1970s. Built on a flat area called the “plain of Santi Quaranta,” it continues eastward along the course of the creek. It is named after the plain of the same name in which, according to an ancient legend, 40 Christian martyrs were slaughtered; but more likely in memory of the Forty Martyrs of Sebaste. The ward is home to the stadium, a kindergarten and the headquarters of the ITCG “M. Capitolo” (Technical Commercial, Surveyor and Technical Tourist Institute).

== Economy ==
=== Agriculture ===
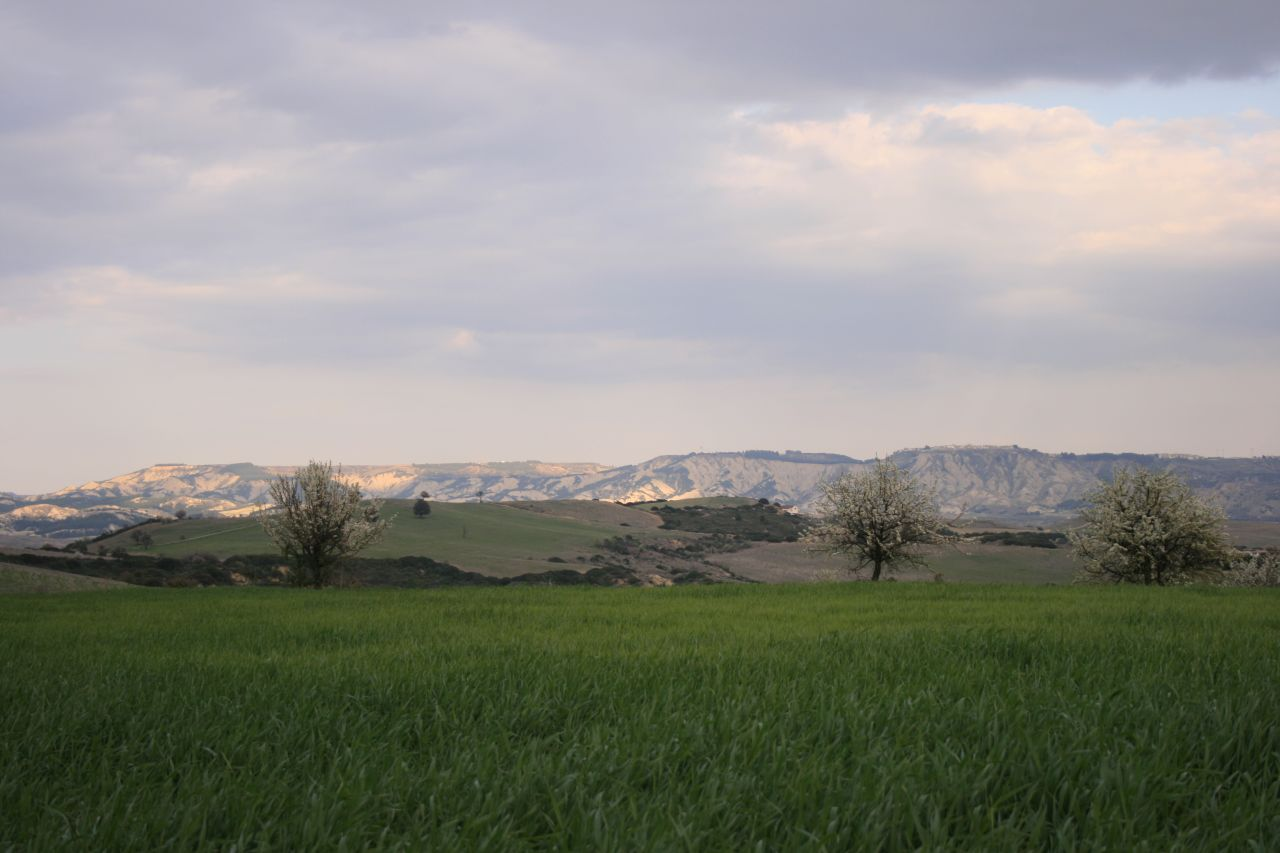
Seeded fields at the foot of Anglona Hill.

The city has a predominantly agricultural economy, and the cultivation of citrus fruits and fruit trees is widespread. Renowned are the oranges of Tursi known as i partajall or portogallo, imported around the year one thousand by the Saracens, which have undergone, over the years, a kind of natural genetic modification that has made them unique in their species. This type of orange called “Arancia Staccia” takes its name from an ancient game similar to bowls in which the staccia, a flat, smooth stone, was used. The staccia orange is nearly flat and flattened at the poles, ripens in March, has a very high average weight and can easily reach one kilogram. The staccia orange is cultivated in the valley floor of the Agri and Sinni rivers and, even more specifically, in the municipalities of Tursi and Montalbano Jonico, but also in that of Colobraro, Valsinni and San Giorgio Lucano.

The enormous spread of citrus cultivation over the last few centuries in the valley below Anglona has given it the name “Vallone della Conca d'Oro,” as it was one of the first locations in Italy for the cultivation of oranges. On January 30, 2007, thanks to the “Consortium for the Protection and Valorization of the Arancia Staccia of Tursi and Montalbano Jonico,” the fruit received the PDO denomination.

There are cultivations of peaches (percoco bianco) for which the Protected Geographical Indication, PGI, has been requested. Vines are also grown, from which Matera DOC is made, and peppers from which the classic Zafaran (pupàcce crusk in Tursitano dialect), also PGI, is made.

=== Breeding ===
Livestock farming is fairly widespread, as in the rest of the Lucanian hinterland. The main herds are sheep and goats, resulting in the production of pecorino cheese, goat cheese and lamb meat.

=== Tourism ===
Tourism has increased sharply in the last two decades over the entire province. In particular, over the period 1999–2016, figures have more than tripled over the entire province. Tursi's most visited structures remain historic buildings, such as the sanctuary of Santa Maria Regina di Anglona, elevated to a minor basilica in 1999, and the former Franciscan convent, both of which are national monuments.

Tursi's historic center, the Rabatana, experiences a particular influx of visitors in the summer months and especially during the Christmas season, when the district is used as a backdrop for a living nativity scene.

== Infrastructure and transportation ==
=== Roads ===
The main roads connecting the municipality are the Fondo Valle d'Agri State Road 598 to the north, which runs along the course of the Agri River, and the Sinni Valley State Road 653 to the south, which runs along the course of the Sinni River. Both connect the municipality via provincial road 154.

=== Railways ===
The locality is served by the Policoro-Tursi station, located on the Ionian railway, originally named Tursi-Policoro, it assumed its current name in 1961.

== Administration ==
| Period | | Office holder | Party | Title | Notes |
|---|---|---|---|---|---|
| March 30, 2010 | May 31, 2015 | Giuseppe Domenico Labriola | Civic list | Mayor | |
| May 31, 2015 | September 21, 2020 | Salvatore Cosma | Civic list | Mayor | |
| September 21, 2020 | in office | Salvatore Cosma | Civic list | Mayor | |

== Sister cities ==
- Genoa, since 2005
- Valmontone, since 2004

== Sports ==
Since 2007, AcsTursi Basket has been involved in advancing one of the community's first sports. In 2016, Asd Tursi Calcio 2008 was established from the dissolution of the previous TursiRotondella team. The team has been playing since its founding year in the Lucanian promotion category. In the same year parallel to the first team, the youth team Asd Academy Tursi was also established.

=== Sports facilities ===
Among the city's sports facilities, there is the stadium named after Pino Di Tommaso, the Stadio Mimmo Garofalo, which was inaugurated on June 3, 2007, by the Juventus under-16 students during the first match of the XI Gaetano Scirea Cup. The stadium, located in Pontemasone area, has a capacity of 500 spectators, a covered grandstand, locker rooms and night lighting. In the Santi Quaranta district is the municipal sports field, which is used for the football club's training sessions and youth team matches. In the same neighborhood, there is the “Nicola Russo” tennis court, while in Via Roma there is the “Tonino Parziale” five-a-side football field.

== See also ==
- Lucania (theme)
- Roman Catholic Diocese of Tursi-Lagonegro

== Bibliography ==
- Adameșteanu, Dinu (1993). Topografia e viabilità, in Megale Hellàs. Storia e civiltà della Magna Grecia (in Italian). Milano: Libri Scheiwiller.
- Alessio, Giovanni (1977). Un'oasi linguistica preindoeuropea nella regione baltica? (in Italian). Firenze: Pamphlet.
- al-Idrisi, Muhammad (1100–1166). Libro del re Ruggero (in Italian). Translated by Amari, Michele; Schiaparelli, Celestino. Roma Coi Tipi del Salviucci.
- Andenna, Cristina (2015). Anglona dalle origini sino ai primi anni del Trecento (in Italian).
- Antonini, Giuseppe (1987) [1745]. La Lucania (in Italian). Vol. 1. ed. A. Forni.
- Avolio, Francesco (1995). Bommèspre. Profilo linguistico dell'Italia centro-meridionale (in Italian). San Severo: Gerni.
- Baronio, Cesare (1588–1607). Annales ecclesiastici (in Latin). Rome.
- Beck, Hans Georg (1980). Geschichte der orthodoxen Kirche im byzantinischen Reich: Ein Handbuch (in German). Gottingen: Vandenhoeck & Ruprecht.
- Bernabò, Barbara (2002). Placidia Doria Spinola, una dama genovese tra Liguria, Lunigiana e Regno di Napoli (in Italian). Pistoia: Tip. Pistoiese.
- Betocchi, Carlo; Pierro, Albino (1973). Incontro a Tursi (in Italian). Laterza.
- Biscaglia, Carmela (2003). Il Liber iurium della città di Tricarico. Introduzione, I (in Italian). Galatina: Congedo.
- Biscaglia, Carmela (2004). Cosimo Damiano Fonseca (ed.). La forma urbis della Rabatana di Tursi. Il processo evolutivo della città e il suo contesto storico attraverso le fonti notarili dei secoli XVI-XVII e i carteggi dell'Archivio Doria Pamphilj (in Italian).
- Biscaglia, Carmela (2010). Micalizzi, Paolo; Greco, Antonella (eds.). Tursi in Basilicata. Città e territorio nella veduta da monte San Martino: Il mostrato, il taciuto (in Italian). ed. Kappa.
- Boccardi, E. (2004). Guida ai luoghi pierriani, Tursi – Città di Pierro (in Italian). Policoro, Italy: Grafidea.
- Bruno, Rocco (1984). Anglona: una città, un vescovado, un santuario (in Italian). Matera, Italy: G. Liantonio.
- Bruno, Rocco (1989) [1977]. Storia di Tursi (in Italian). Ginosa, Italy: Tip. Miranda.
- Bruno, Rocco (2005). Tursi, immagini di un secolo (in Italian). Matera, Italy: graficom.
- Buck, R. J. (November 1971). "The Via Herculia". Papers of the British School at Rome. 39. Cambridge University Press: 66–87. doi:10.1017/s0068246200007832. ISSN 0068-2462. JSTOR 40310694.
- Buonsanto, Vito (1819). Introduzione alla geografia antica e moderna delle provincie delle due sicilie di qua dal faro (in Italian). Naples: Tipografia Filomatica.
- Burman, Edward (1991). Emperor to Emperor: Italy Before the Renaissance. Constable.
- Cardarelli, Andrea; Pacciarelli, Marco; Vanzetti, Alessandro (2006). Studi di protostoria in onore di Renato Peroni (in Italian). All’Insegna del Giglio.
- Cilento, Adele (2006). Bisanzio in Sicilia e nel sud dell'Italia (in Italian). Udine: ed. Magnus.
- Crispino, T.; Piscopo, S.; Crispino, N. (2008). Tursi Turistica (in Italian). Matera: Fondazione Sassi.
- Croce d'Oro, Associazione (1999). A unìt' ch' ll'àt' / Insieme agli altri (in Italian). Rotondella: ArchiviA.
- Darrouzès, Jean (1981). Notitiae episcopatuum ecclesiae constantinopolitanae (in Latin). Parigi: Institut Etudes Byzantines.
- De Sivo, Giacinto (2013). Storia delle Due Sicilie 1847–1861 (in Italian). Vol. 2. Edizioni Trabant.
- Di Cugno, Michele (2010). Il brigantaggio postunitario. Dalle cronache al mito (in Italian). Bari: ed. Mario Adda.
- Di Gregorio, Salvatore (1999). Anglona e Tursi (in Italian). Tursi: Electa.
- De Salvo, N. (1845). "La diocesi di Anglona-Tursi". Enciclopedia dell'Ecclesiastico (in Italian). Vol. VIII. Naples.
- Fonseca, Cosimo Damiano (1995). Le vie dell'acqua in Calabria e Basilicata (in Italian). Catanzaro: Generico.
- Fusco, Rosa Maria (1994). Amicizia & Cultura – Tursi 1982–1992 (in Italian). Tursi: Tip. Ottomano.
- Gelao, Clara (1992). Altobello Persio e "chompagni": i presepi di Matera Altamura e Tursi con un intermezzo a Gallipoli (in Italian). Bari: Arte e Folklore.
- Tragni, Bianca; Clara Gelao (1992). Il presepe pugliese arte e folklore (in Italian). Bari: Adda.
- Giustiniani, Lorenzo (1797–1816). Dizionario geografico-ragionato del Regno di Napoli (in Italian). Naples.
- Iusco, Anna Grele (1981). Soprintendenza per i Beni Artistici e Storici della Basilicata – Arte in Basilicata (in Italian). Matera: ed. De Luca.
- Guillou, André (1972). Spiritualità e società religiosa greca nell'Italia Meridionale e la Sicilia (in Italian). Istituto Superiore di Teologia Ecumenica "S. Nicola".
- Kehr, Paul Fridolin (1908). Italia pontificia, sive, Repertorium privilegiorum et litterarum a Romanis pontificibus ante annum MCLXXXXVIII Italiae ecclesiis monasteriis civitatibus singulisque personis concessorum: Etruria (in Italian). Apud Weidmannos.
- Levi, Sara Tiziana (1999). Produzione e circolazione della ceramica nella Sibaritide Protostorica. I. Impasto e Dolii. (Prima di Sibari, 1) (in Italian). All’Insegna del Giglio.
- Mancarella, Giovan Battista; Campese, Rocco (1989). Ricerche linguistiche a Tursi (in Italian). Lecce: Università degli Studi di Lecce.
- Mancarella, Giovan Battista; Campese, Rocco (1994). Lessico dialettale di Tursi (in Italian). Ed. del Grifo.
- Marti, Mario (1985). Pierro al suo paese: atti del convegno su "La poesia di Albino Pierro" : Tursi 30/31 ottobre 1982 (in Italian). Congedo.
- Martino, Nicola (1970). Albino Pierro (PDF) (in Italian). Montreal: McGill University.
- Martucci (1790). Ragionamento intorno al pieno dominio della Real Mensa Vescovile di Anglona e Tursi sul feudo di Anglona contro l'Università ed alcuni particolari cittadini di Tursi (in Italian). Naples.
- Mazzella, Scipione (1601). Descrittione del regno di Napoli (in Italian). Naples: G.B.Cappelli.
- Melillo, Michele (1955). Atlante fonetico lucano (in Italian).
- Ministero per i Beni e le Attività Culturali (2004). Tursi – la Rabatana (in Italian). Matera: ed. Altrimedia.
- Monachino, Vincenz (1998). Guida degli archivi diocesani d'Italia (in Italian). Ministero per i beni culturali e ambientali, Ufficio centrale per i beni archivistici.
- Montesano, Nicola (1999). "La Rabatana di Tursi. Processi storici e sviluppi urbani" (PDF). Basilicata Regione Notizie (in Italian). pp. 98–109. Archived from the original (PDF) on 3 August 2016.
- Nigro, Antonio (1851). Memoria tipografica ed istorica sulla città di Tursi e sull'antica Pandosia di Eraclea oggi Anglona (in Italian). Naples: Tip. Miranda.
- Noviello, Franco (2014). Storiografia dell'Arte Pittorica Popolare in Lucania e nella Basilicata (in Italian). Osanna Edizioni.
- Pacichelli, Giovan Battista (1703). Il regno di Napoli in prospettiva (in Italian). Naples: Stamp. Michele Luigi Mutio.
- Palazzo, Isabella (1997). Il pane quotidiano – l'alimentazione lucana dall'Unità ad oggi (in Italian). ed. Calice.
- Pedio, Tommaso (1986). La Basilicata borbonica (in Italian). Venosa: ed. Osanna.
- Pedio, Tommaso (1963). Contadini e galantuomini nelle province del Mezzogiorno d'Italia durante i moti del 1848 (in Italian). Matera: ed. Fratelli Montemurro.
- Pedio, Tommaso (1966). Vita politica in Italia meridionale. 1860–1870 (in Italian). Potenza: ed. La nuova libreria.
- Pellegrino, Bruno (1978). Legittimismo borbonico e temporalismo: i vescovi del Mezzogiorno e il rifiuto della rivoluzione nazionale del 1860. Società e Storia (in Italian). Vol. 3. ed. Franco Angeli.
- Pergolini, Pamela; Faccioli, Ilaria (2011). Un gioco tira l'altro. Un viaggio tra i più bei giochi delle regioni d'Italia (in Italian). EDT-Giralangolo.
- Quilici, Lorenzo (1967). Forma Italiae (in Italian). Vol. I, Siris–Heraclea. Rome: Istituto di topografia antica dell'università di Roma.
- Quilici, Lorenzo (2000). Valorizzazione storico-turistica dei siti archeologici del Basso Sinni (in Italian).
- Quilici, Lorenzo; Quilici Gigli, Stefania (2003). Carta Archeologica Della Valle Del Sinni. Documentazione Cartografica (in Italian). L'erma Di Bretschneider.
- Racioppi, Giacomo (1889). Storia dei popoli della Lucania e della Basilicata (in Italian). Vol. 1 & 2. Rome: Loescher.
- Robertella, Tito (1984). Nuove Luci Lucane (in Italian). Avellino: ed. Menna.
- Romanelli, Domenico (1815). Antica topografia istorica del regno di Napoli (in Italian). Vol. 1. Naples: Stamperia Reale.
- Russo, F. (1957). La metropolia di S. Severina, in "Archivio storico per la Calabria e la Lucania" anno XVI, f. II, Rip. in Scritti storici calabresi (in Italian). Naples: Piazza Paganica.
- Schlager, H.; Rudiger, U. (1967). Santa Maria di Anglona: rapporto preliminare sulle due campagne di scavi negli anni 1965 e 1966, in Atti della Accademia nazionale dei Lincei. Notizie degli scavi, XXI (in Italian).
- Schmidt, Kurt Dietrich; Wolf, Ernst; Moeller, Bernd (1961). Die Kirche in ihrer Geschichte: Ein Handbuch (in German). Gottingen: Vandenhoeck & Ruprecht.
- Catalogo della Soprintendenza per (1998). Restauri in Basilicata 1993–1997 (in Italian). Matera: La Tipografica.
- Summo, R. (1998). Tursi... ha ispirato la poesia (in Italian). Matera: Tip. Antezza.
- Troyli, Placido (1747). Istoria generale del Reame di Napoli (in Italian). Naples: Regio Officio Topografico.
- Ughelli, Ferdinando (1702). Italia sacra Episcopi Anglonenses et Tursienses (in Italian). Rome.
- Ughelli, Ferdinando (1721). Italia Sacra sive da episcopis Italiae et insularum adiacentium (in Latin). Venice: Apud Sebastianum Coleti.
- Zorzi, Don; Festival committee, eds. (2006). Iniziative culturali ed artistiche, Anglona 2006 [Cultural and artistic initiatives, Anglona 2006] (in Italian). Rotondella: ArchiviA.
- Calabria bizantina, vita religiosa e strutture amministrative: atti del primo e secondo Incontro di studi bizantini (in Italian). Parallelo '38. 1974.
- Visentin, Barbara (2009). La Basilicata nell'alto Medioevo. Il caso di Santa Maria di Anglona in Basilicata Medievale a cura di Edoardo D'Angelo (in Italian). Naples: ed. Liguori.
