= Pandosia (Bruttium) =

Pandosia (Ancient Greek: Πανδοσία) was an ancient city in Bruttium, in what is now Calabria, southern Italy. According to Livy it was situated near the border between Bruttium and Lucania (now Basilicata). Strabo writes it was located in Bruttium, a "little above" Consentia (modern Cosenza). The Barrington Atlas of the Greek and Roman World places the site of the city in the vicinity of Cosenza, but the village Acri and Castrolibero has been suggested as a more precise location.

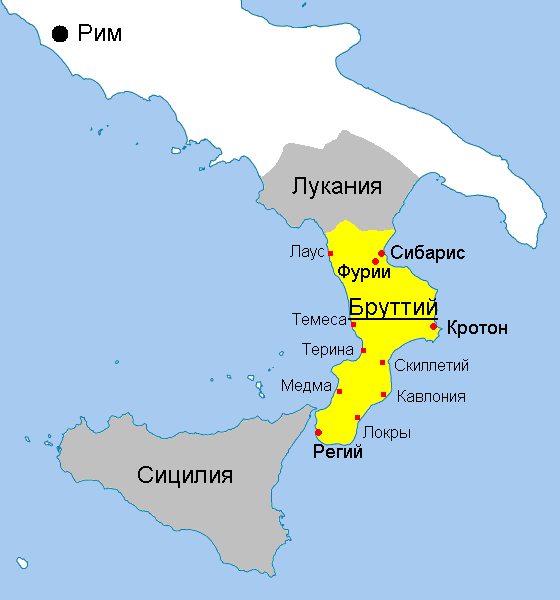

== History ==
According to Strabo it was believed to have been the capital of the Oenotrian kings once. It seems to have certainly received a Greek colony later, as Scylax expressly enumerates it among the Greek cities of this part of Italy, and Scymnus of Chios, though perhaps less distinctly, asserts the same thing. It was probably a colony of Crotona; though the statement of Eusebius, who represents it as founded in the same year with Metapontum, would lead us to regard it as an independent and separate colony. The date assigned by him of 774 BCE, however, is inadmissible. Whether originally an independent settlement or not, Pandosia must have been a dependency of Crotona during the period of greatness of that city, and hence its name is not mentioned among the cities of Magna Graecia. Its only historical celebrity arises from its being the place near which Alexander, king of Epirus, was slain in the Battle of Pandosia by the Lucanians, 331 BCE. That monarch had been warned by an oracle to avoid Pandosia, but he understood this as referring to the town of that name in Thesprotia, on the banks of the Acheron, and was ignorant of the existence of both a town and river of the same names in Italy. The name of Pandosia is again mentioned by Livy in the Second Punic War, among the Bruttian towns retaken by the consul P. Sempronius, in 204 BCE; and it is there noticed, together with Consentia, as opposed to the ignobiles aliae civitates. It was therefore at this time still a place of some consequence; and Strabo seems to imply that it still existed in his time, but there are no subsequent traces of it.

There was great difficulty in determining its position. It is described as a strong fortress, situated on a hill, which had three peaks, whence it was called, in the oracle Πανδοσία τρικόλωνος In addition to the vague statements of Strabo and Livy above cited, it is enumerated by Scymnus of Chios between Crotona and Thurii. But it was clearly an inland town, and stood in the mountains between Consentia and Thurii. The river Acheron was evidently an inconsiderable stream, the name of which is not mentioned on any other occasion, and which, therefore, cannot be identified.

Much confusion has arisen between the Bruttian Pandosia and a town of the same name in Lucania; and some writers have even considered this last as the place where Alexander perished. It is true that Theopompus, in speaking of that event, described Pandosia as a city of the Lucanians, but this is a very natural error, as it was, in fact, near the boundaries of the two nations, and the passages of Livy and Strabo can leave no doubt that it was really situated in the land of the Bruttians.

== See also ==
- List of ancient Greek cities

== Sources ==
=== Primary sources ===
- Livy (1926). Foster, B. O. (ed.). History of Rome. Vol. 4. Cambridge, Massachusetts: Harvard University Press. ISBN 978-0-674-99210-8.
- Orosius (2010). Fear, A. T. (ed.). Seven Books of History Against the Pagans. Liverpool: Liverpool University Press. ISBN 978-1-846-31239-7.
- Strabo (1924). Jones, H. L. (ed.). Geography. Vol. 3. Cambridge, Massachusetts: Harvard University Press. ISBN 978-0-674-99201-6.

=== Secondary sources ===
- "Places: 456108 (Pandosia)". Pleiades. 2012.
