= Pandosia (Lucania) =

Ancient town in Basilicata, Italy

Coordinates: 40.25°N 16.47°E

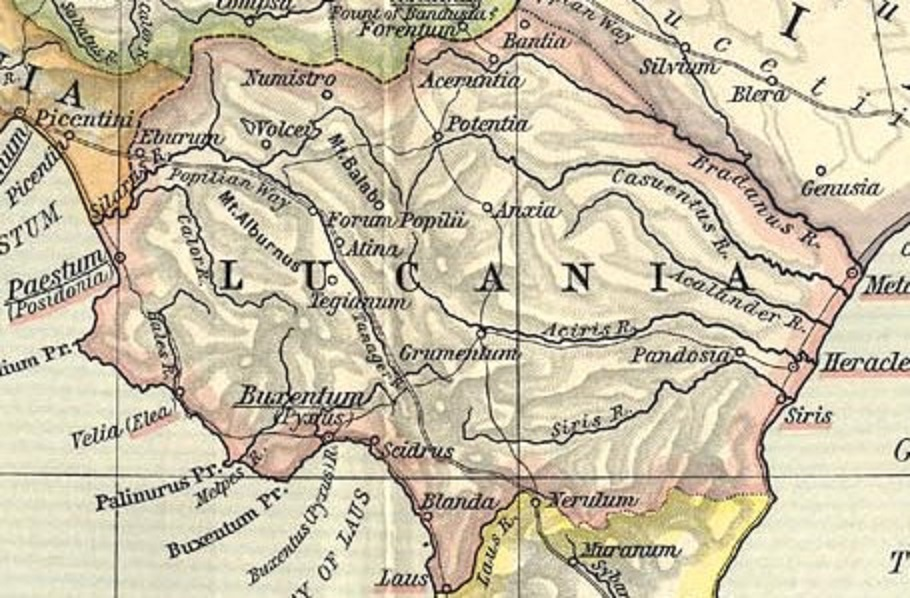
Map settlement of Lucania

Pandosia (Greek: Πανδοσία) was an ancient town of Lucania (now Basilicata), Italy, situated near Heraclea. It has often been confounded with Pandosia in Bruttium; but the distinct existence of a Lucanian town of the name is clearly established by two authorities. Plutarch describes Pyrrhus as encamping in the plain between Pandosia and Heraclea, with the river Siris (modern Sinni) in front of him; and the celebrated Tabulae Heracleenses repeatedly refer to the existence of a town of the name in the immediate neighborhood of Heraclea. From these notices we may infer that it was situated at a very short distance from Heraclea, but apparently further inland; and its site has been fixed with some probability at a spot called Santa Maria d'Anglona, about 11 km from the sea, and 6.5 km from Heraclea.

The medieval city of Anglona was a successor to Heraclea, and was an episcopal see down to a late period of the Middle Ages, but is now wholly deserted.

== See also ==
- List of ancient Greek cities
