= Carnival in Italy =

Festival before Lent

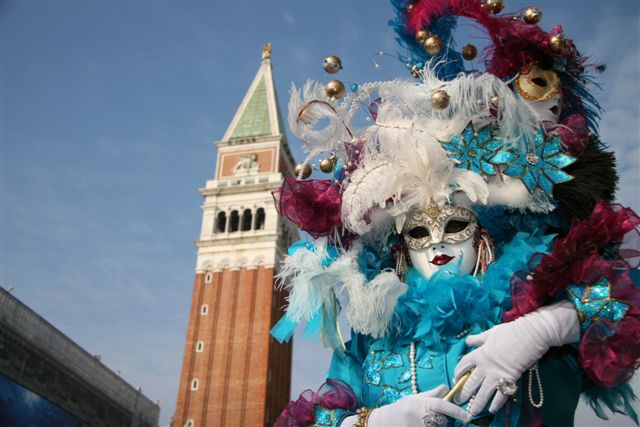
Carnival of Venice in St Mark's Square

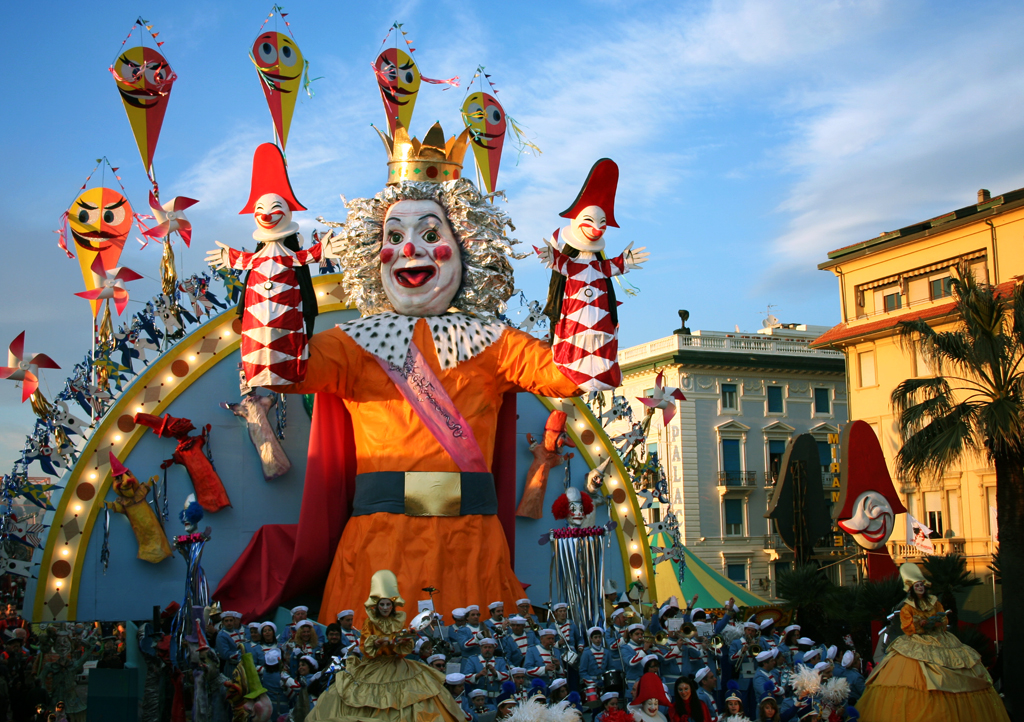
Carnival of Viareggio

Carnival in Italy plays a very important role in Italian folklore, traditionally linked to regional masks, and is celebrated in many cities, some of which are known throughout the world for the special celebrations they organize for this occasion. It is a farewell party to eat, drink, and have fun before the limitations and solemnity of Lent. About a month before Ash Wednesday, Italians celebrate over many weekends with parades, masks, and confetti. The most famous Carnivals in Italy are those held in Venice, Viareggio, Ivrea, Cento, Putignano, Acireale and Sciacca. These Carnivals include masquerades and parades.

The Carnival in Venice was first documented in 1296, with a proclamation by the Venetian Senate announcing a public festival the day before the start of Lent. Today, about 3 million people travel to Venice to take part in the famous Carnival. The Carnival of Viareggio is the second-most popular in Italy. The first Carnival of Viareggio parade was held in 1873. Every year, the Carnival of Viareggio attracts more than 500,000 spectators. The Carnival of Ivrea is famous for its "Battle of the Oranges" fought with fruit between the people on foot and the troops of the tyrant on carts, to remember the wars of the Middle Ages, allegory of struggle for freedom. It is the largest food fight in Italy and surrounding countries. Regarding the origins, a popular account has it that the battle commemorates the city's defiance against the city's tyrant, who is either a member of the Ranieri family or a conflation of the 12th-century Ranieri di Biandrate and the 13th-century Marquis William VII of Montferrat. The Ambrosian carnival is widespread in the most part of the Archdiocese of Milan, where the Ambrosian Rite is observed, and in this area the Carnival ends on the first Sunday of Lent; the last day of Carnival is Saturday, 4 days after the Tuesday on which it ends where the Roman Rite is observed.

In Sardinia, the Carnival (in Sardinian language Carrasecare or Carrasegare) varies greatly from the one in the mainland of Italy. the majority of the Sardinian celebrations features not only feasts and parades but also crude fertility rites such as bloodsheds to fertilize the land, the death and the resurrection of the Carnival characters and representations of violence and torture. The typical characters of the Sardinian Carnival are zoomorphic and/or androgynous, such as the Mamuthones and Issohadores from Mamoiada, the Boes and Merdules from Ottana and many more. The Carnival is celebrated with street performances that are typically accompanied by Sardinian dirges called attittidus, meaning literally "cry of a baby when the mother does not want to nurse him/her anymore" (from the word titta meaning breasts). Other particular and important Carnival instances in Sardinia are the Sartiglia in Oristano and the Tempio Pausania Carnival.

== History ==
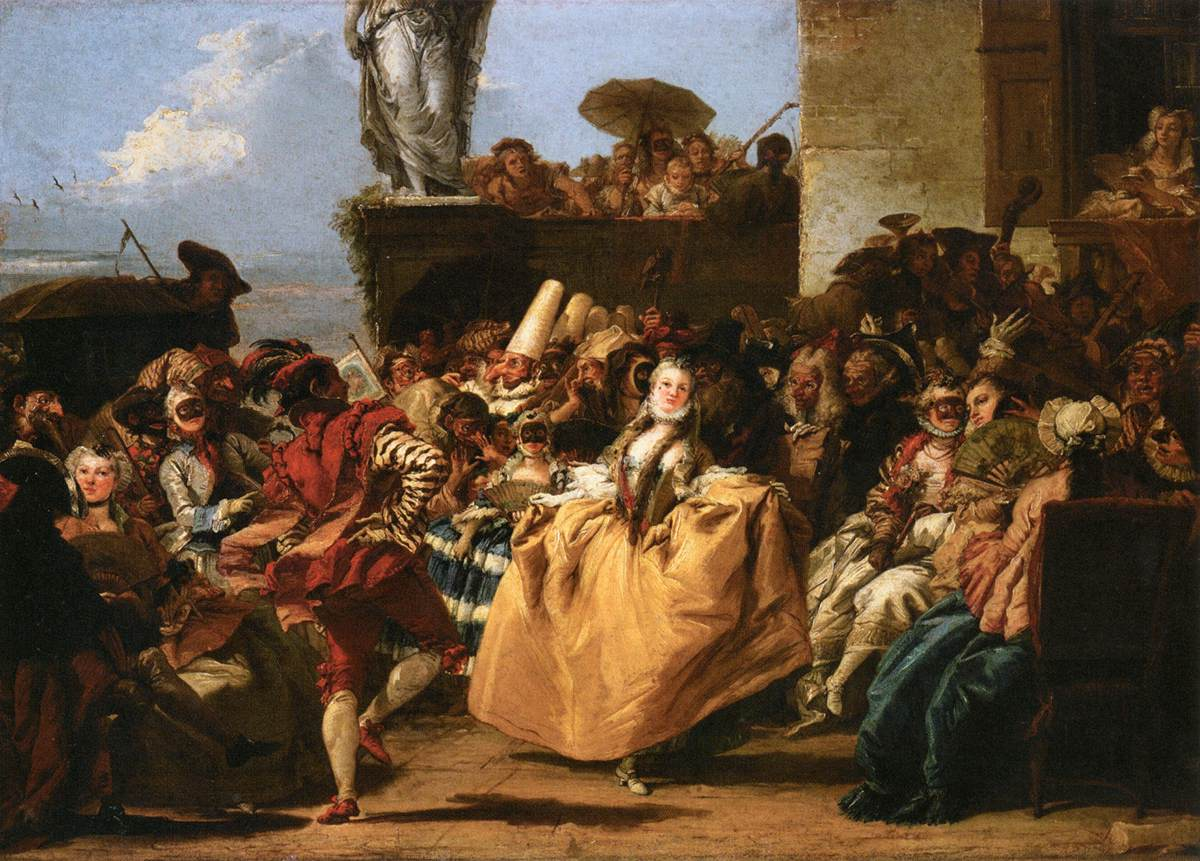
Carnival of Venice, by Giovanni Domenico Tiepolo, 1750

The origins of this event in Italy may be traced to ancient Greece and Rome, when they worshipped Bacchus and Saturn. Some think they date back to archaic winter-to-spring ceremonies. Despite its pagan origins, the event was so extensively celebrated and the tradition so powerful that it was swiftly altered to fit into Catholic rituals. Carnival in Italy is traditionally celebrated on Fat Tuesday, but the weekend prior features activities as well.

Although the origins of Carnival may be traced back to ancient Greek and Roman celebrations, it is associated with the Catholic world. In actuality, it is celebrated on holidays, the final day before Lent when feasting is permitted. Therefore, it does not have a fixed date, but rather relies on the day of Easter. In different places, the celebrations grew into a party and a parade for diverse causes. Whether the higher classes were exhibiting their wealth with elegantly decorated carriages, or the poorer classes were following troops through the streets, Carnival evolved across Italy. Many Carnivals were prohibited in the 18th century, only to be reinstated in the 20th.

== Venice ==
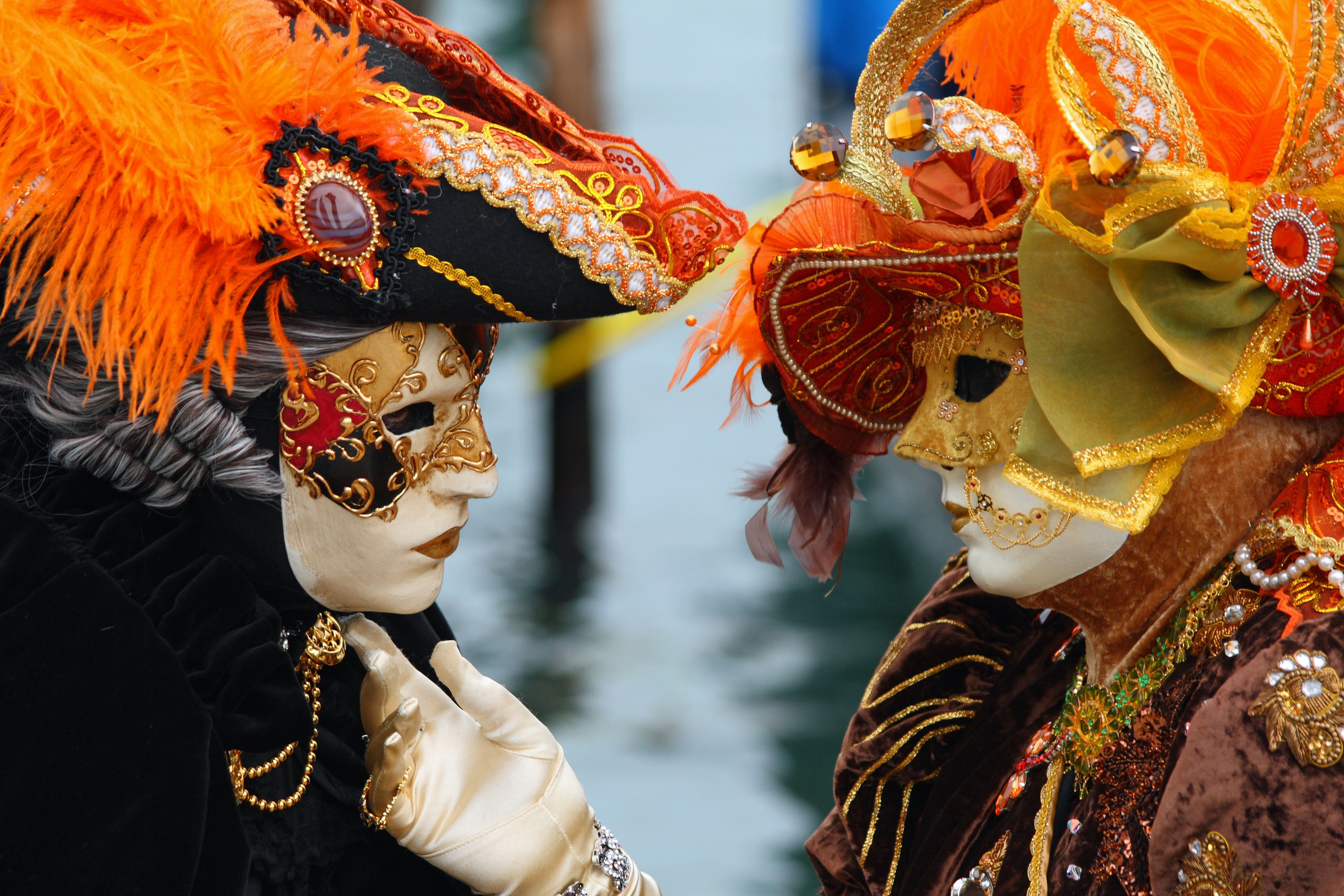
The Venetian Carnival tradition is most famous for its distinctive masks.

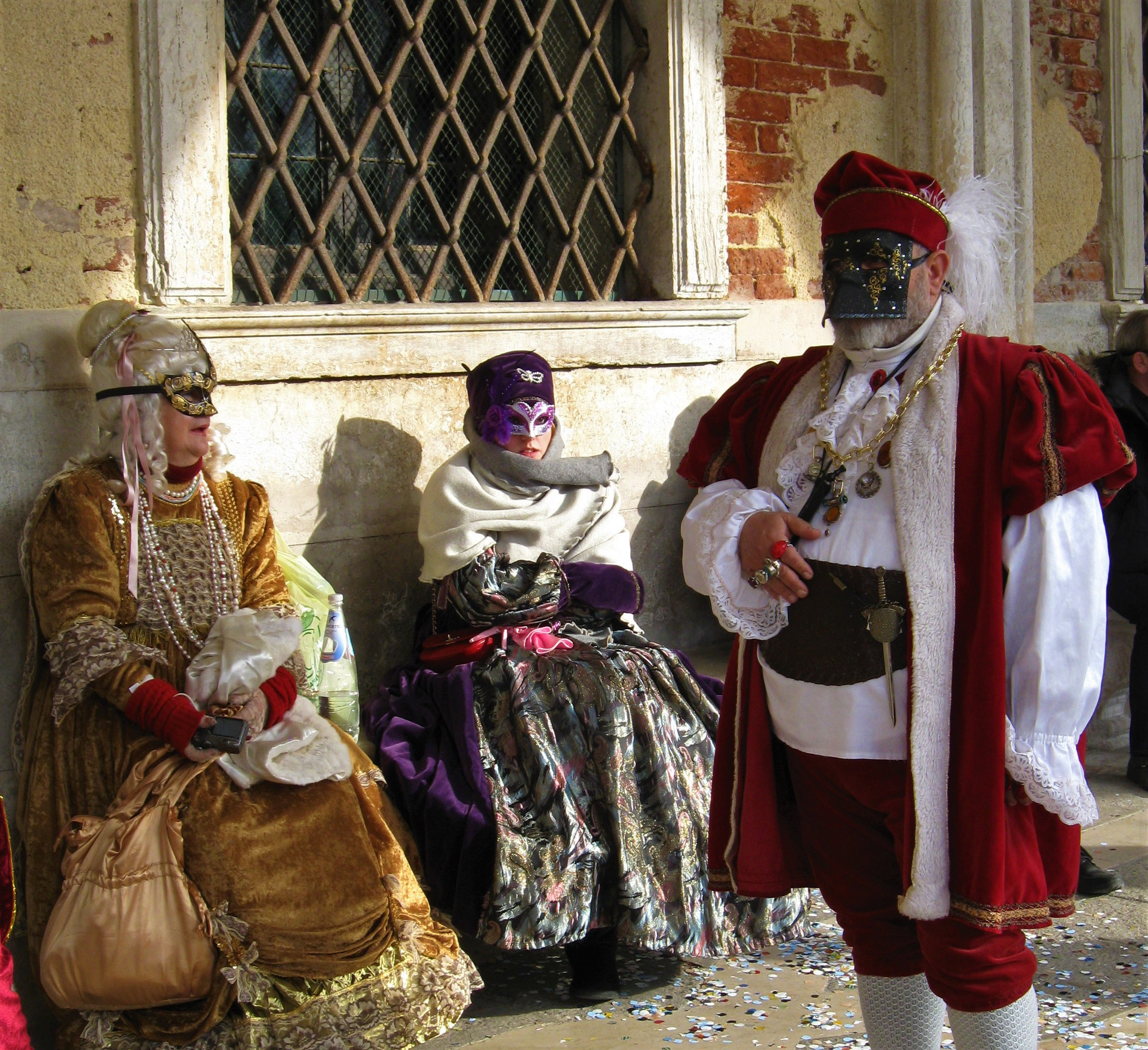
Carnival of Venice in 2013

The Carnival of Venice is an annual festival held in Venice, Italy, famous throughout the world for its elaborate costumes and masks. The Carnival ends on Shrove Tuesday (Martedì Grasso or Mardi Gras), which is the day before the start of Lent on Ash Wednesday. The Carnival traces its origins to the Middle Ages, existing for several centuries until it was abolished in 1797. The tradition was revived in 1979.

The Carnival in Venice was first documented in 1296, with a proclamation by the Venetian Senate announcing a public festival the day before the start of Lent. Unquestionably one of the most well-known Carnival festivities in the world, the Carnival of Venice is rife with mystery, adventure, and conspiracy. The day served to break down barriers between people of different economic standings and religious beliefs. During the Renaissance, masked comic performers performed in Venice's piazzas. Today, about 3 million people travel to Venice to take part in the famous Festa veneziana. This makes it the most important event in the city and the biggest Carnival celebration in Italy.

According to legend, the Carnival of Venice began after the military victory of the Venetian Republic over the patriarch of Aquileia, Ulrich II, in the year 1162. In honour of this, the people started to dance and gather in St Mark's Square. Apparently, this festival started in that period and became official during the Renaissance. In the 17th century, the Baroque Carnival preserved the prestigious image of Venice in the world. It was very famous during the 18th century. It encouraged licence and pleasure, but it was also used to protect Venetians from present and future anguish. However, under the rule of Emperor Francis II, the festival was outlawed entirely in 1797 and the use of masks became strictly forbidden. It reappeared gradually in the 19th century, but only for short periods and above all for private feasts, where it became an occasion for artistic creations.

Masks have always been an important feature of the Venetian Carnival. Traditionally people were allowed to wear them between the festival of Santo Stefano (Saint Stephen's Day, 26 December) and the end of the Carnival season at midnight of Shrove Tuesday (movable, but during February or early March). As masks were also allowed on Ascension and from 5 October to Christmas, people could spend a large portion of the year in disguise.

Maskmakers (mascherari) enjoyed a special position in society, with their own laws and their own guild, with their own statute dated 10 April 1436. Mascherari belonged to the fringe of painters and were helped in their task by sign-painters who drew faces onto plaster in a range of different shapes and paying extreme attention to detail.

Venetian masks can be made of leather or porcelain, or by using the original glass technique. The original masks were rather simple in design, decoration, and often had a symbolic and practical function. Nowadays, most Italian masks are made with the application of gesso and gold leaf and are hand-painted, using natural feathers and gems to decorate. However, this makes them rather expensive when compared to the widespread, low-quality masks produced abroad. This competition accelerates the decline of this historical craftsmanship particular to the city of Venice.

Several distinct styles of mask are worn in the Venice Carnival, some with identifying names. People with different occupations wore different masks.

== Viareggio ==
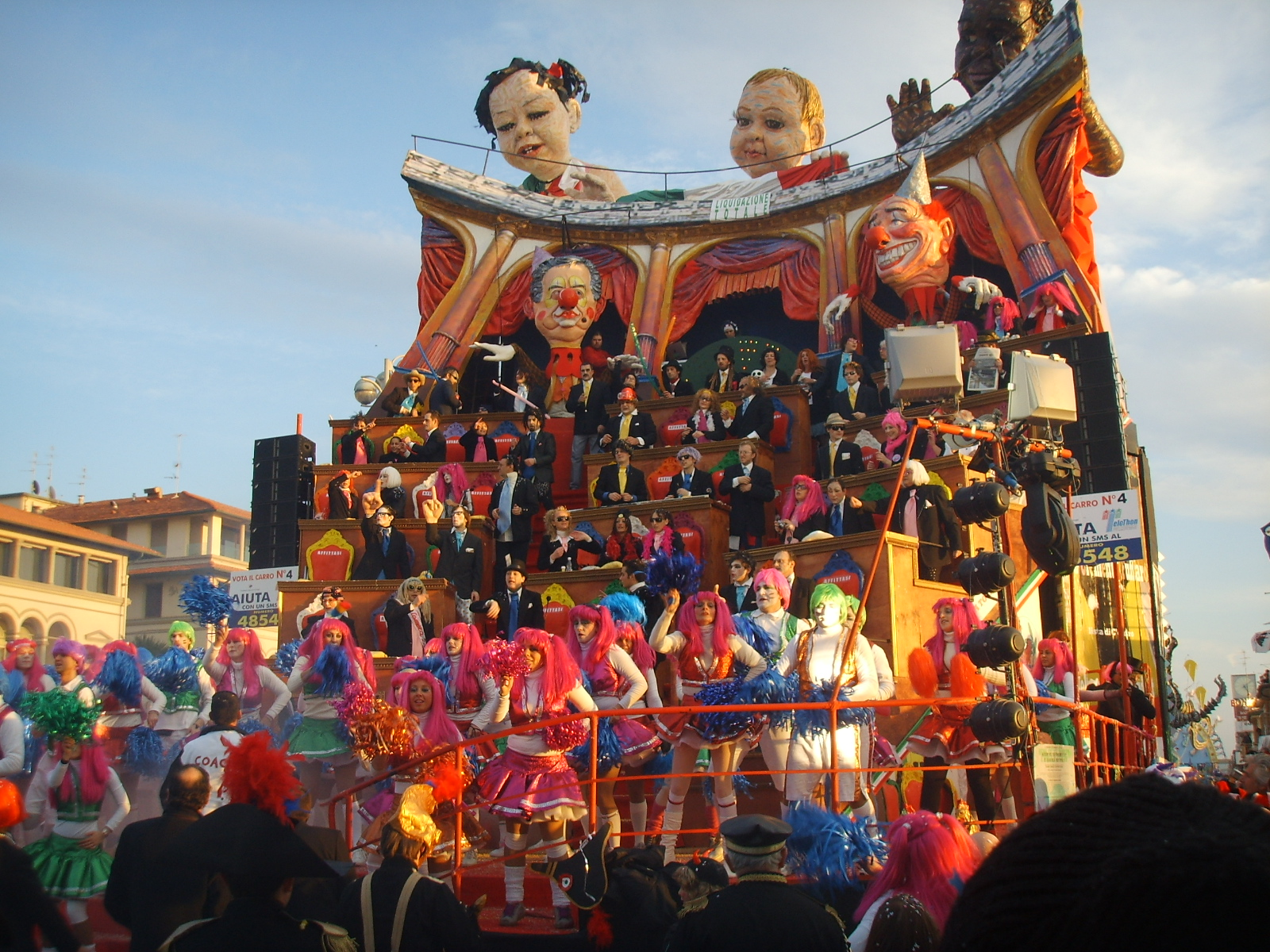
Carnival of Viareggio

The Carnival of Viareggio is the second-most popular in Italy. The Carnival of Viareggio is a carnival event annually held in the Tuscan city of Viareggio, Italy. It is considered amongst the most renowned carnival celebrations in both Italy and Europe. Its main characteristic is given by the parade of floats and masks, usually made of paper-pulp, depicting caricatures of popular people, such as politicians, showmen, and sportsmen; the parade is held on the Viareggio avenue located alongside the local beach. Every year, the Carnevale di Viareggio attracts more than 500,000 spectators.

Carnival celebrations are scheduled every weekend night in the city's different quarters or Rioni with the best known bars, restaurants, discos and hotels in Versilia hosting all-night colourful masked parties. Additionally, during the four-week celebration, plays in vernacular language are staged around the city. The carnival has papier-mâché gargantuan allegorical floats with the largest ones weighing about 40 st (560 lb; 254 kg) and reaching 14 m (46 ft). The Carnival Giant Float Parades take place along a 2-kilometre-long (2,000 m) ring set aside Viareggio's Liberty era boardwalk, best known as La Passeggiata.

The first Viareggio Carnival parade was held in 1873, when some wealthy middle-class men decided to organize a parade of floats adorned with flowers; a number of local citizens, as a sign of protest, then decided to put on masks in order to show their refusal of high taxes they were forced to pay. The first float to win the parade, in 1883, was named I Quattro Mori ('The Four Moors'), an accurate representation of the Livorno statue of the same name. The official mascot of the Viareggio Carnival is a Burlamacco, first depicted in 1931 by Uberto Bonetti. Since 2001, all the floats are built in an apposite seat, called Cittadella del Carnevale ('Carnival Citadel').

== Ivrea ==
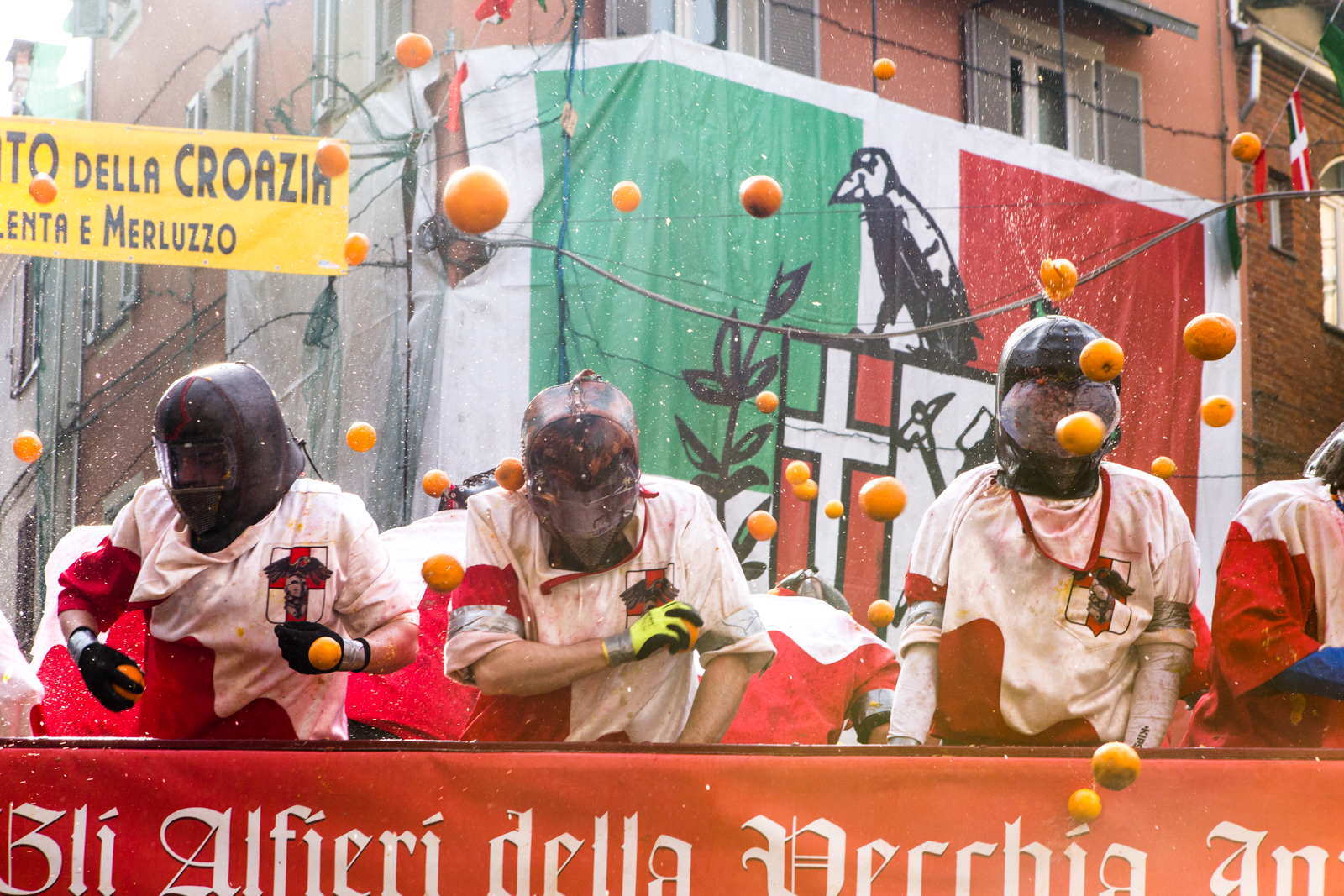
The Battle of the Oranges at the Carnival of Ivrea, in Ivrea, Italy

The Carnival of Ivrea is famous for its "Battle of the Oranges" fought with fruit between the people on foot and the troops of the tyrant on carts, to remember the wars of the Middle Ages, allegory of struggle for freedom. It is the largest food fight in Italy and surrounding countries.

Regarding the origins, a popular account has it that the battle commemorates the city's defiance against the city's tyrant, who is either a member of the Ranieri family or a conflation of the 12th-century Ranieri di Biandrate and the 13th-century Marquis William VII of Montferrat. This tyrant attempted to rape a young commoner (often specified as a miller's daughter) on the evening of her wedding, supposedly exercising the droit du seigneur. The tyrant's plan backfired when the young woman instead decapitated him, after which the populace stormed and burned the palace. Each year, a young girl is chosen to play the part of Violetta, the defiant young woman.

Every year the citizens remember their liberation with the "Battle of the Oranges", where teams of aranceri (orange handlers) on foot throw oranges (representing old weapons and stones) against aranceri riding in carts (representing the tyrant's ranks). During the 19th-century French occupation of Italy, the Carnival of Ivrea was modified to add representatives of the French army. Another adaptation of the story has the oranges used to symbolize the removed testicles of the tyrant.

The oldest rituals of Ivrea Carnival include a large bonfire and are similar to ancient celebrations linked to the end of winter and the rise of the new spring. The battle was on hiatus during 2021, but returned in 2023. Other cancellations occurred in 1915–1918 and 1940–1945.

== Foiano della Chiana ==
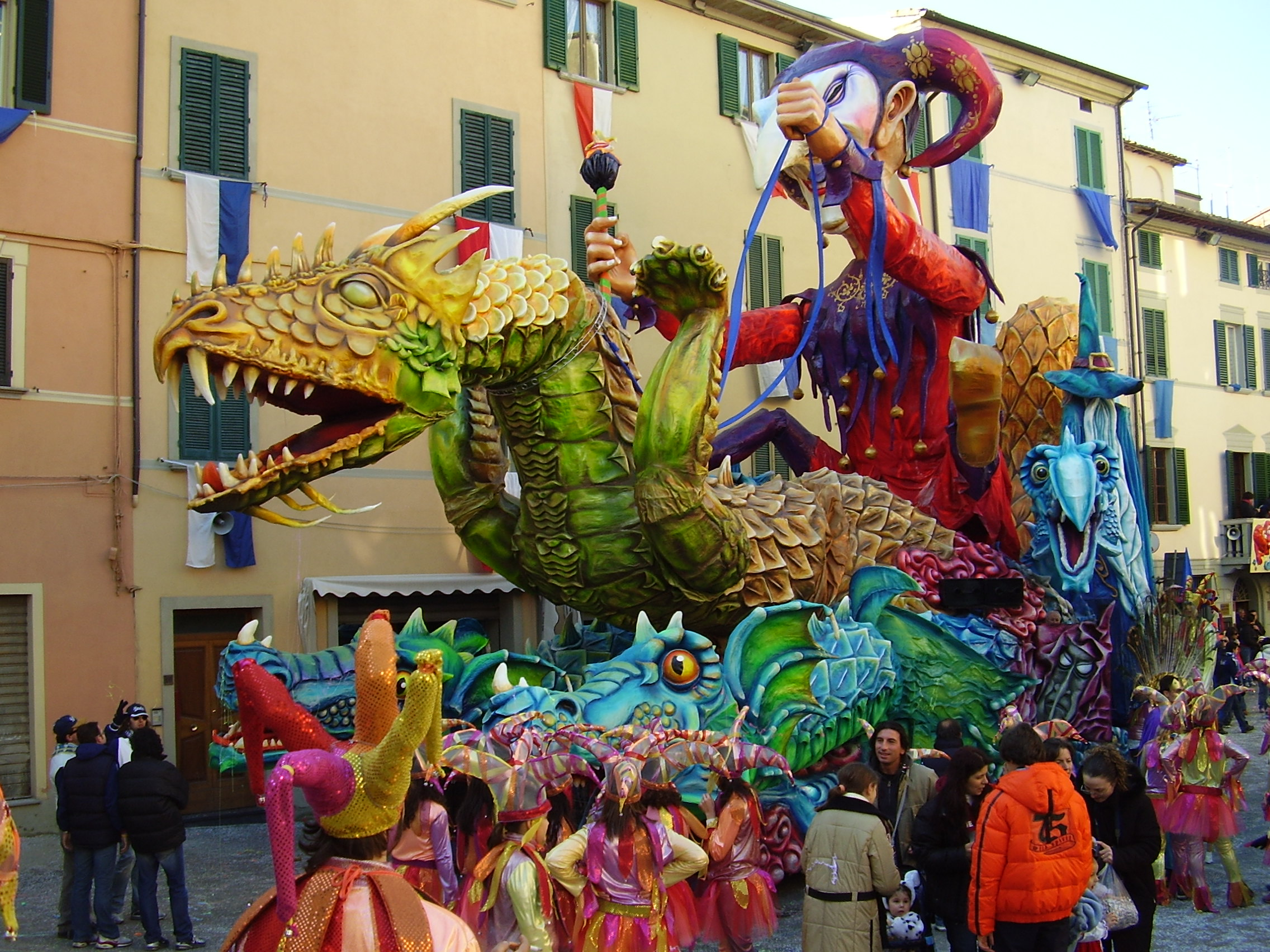
Carnival of Foiano della Chiana

The Carnival of Foiano della Chiana is a carnival event yearly held in the Tuscan city of Foiano della Chiana, in Tuscany. It is one of the most famous carnivals in Italy, and the oldest, starting in 1539. This carnival takes all year to prepare for, and it is as important to Foiano as the Palio is to Siena. The festival is derived from medieval propitiatory rituals meant to appease the townspeople and create a joyous atmosphere to bring in the new year.

The population of Foiano is subdivided into four cantieri (districts): the oldest are the "Azzurri" (azures) and the "Rustici" (rustics), that were created in 1933, and "Bombolo" (plump), which was born in 1934; the youngest cantiere are the "Nottambuli" (night owls), formed in 1961. Other three cantieri, the "Pacifici" (peacefuls), "Cuccioli" (puppies) and "Vitelloni" (big calves) disappeared during the 1940s-1950s. The cantieri compete in making a float, inspired to a free subject.

Initially, the floats were town carriages and carri matti where lupine, chestnuts and salt cod would be thrown out to the crowd as a treat. The floats are now made of papier-mâché and they have allegorical or political subjects, sometimes featuring political or actuality events, famous people or popular culture. The floats are judged by a jury, composed by a sculptor, a painter, a journalist, a scenographer and an art critic. The Cantiere that made the most voted float wins the "Coppa del Carnevale" (Carnival Cup). An effigy of Giocondo, King of the Carnival is made from straw and rags, and is burned in the main square as a form of collective purification for the people of Foiano. Before the burning, a testament of the year’s events is read aloud like an epilogue for the past year and a prologue to the new starting year.

== Satriano di Lucania ==
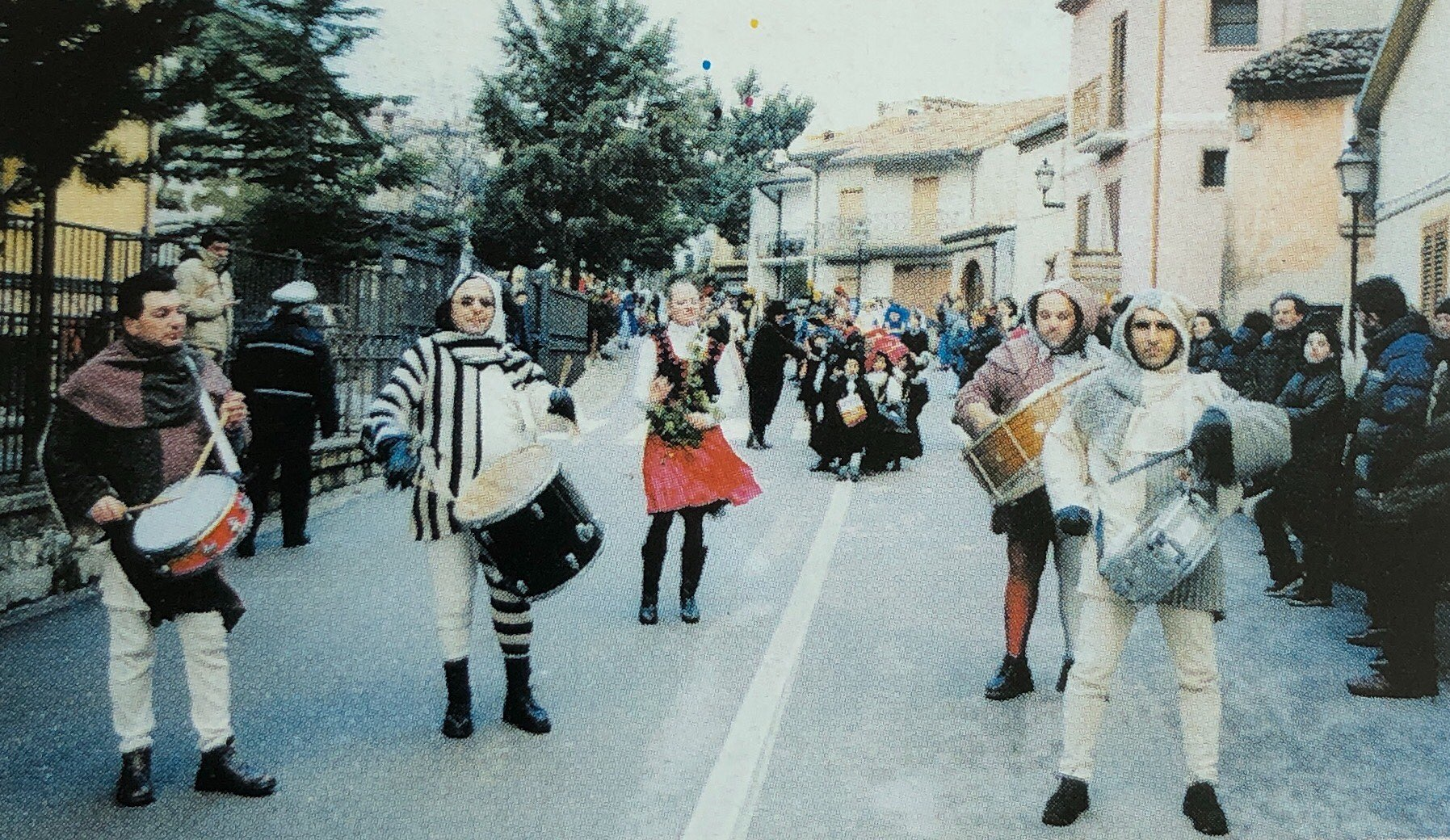
Carnival of Satriano di Lucania

The Carnival of Satriano di Lucania, held in Satriano di Lucania every February, is one of the country's many carnivals. Held on the Friday, Saturday and Sunday before Fat Tuesday (a Mardi Gras festival), it has been conducted for centuries. The event is among the most important carnival traditions of the region and of Italy and it is unique in that participants wear costumes, or masks, of bears, hermits, or lent.

The carnival has been held for centuries, but its origins are largely unknown. One theory is that it comes from the historical destruction of the ancient town Satrianum by Queen Joanna II of Anjou-Durazzo after an aristocratic girl and protégée of the queen was raped in 1421 by young men wearing goat skins. Three symbols, or masks, represent the nature of the crime. Representing the young men dressed in animal skins are skin-cladden bears. Poverty following the destruction of the town is represented by the hermits and sadness is represented by the lent, the women dressed in black.

Another hypothesis promoted before World War II is that a Franciscan hermit lived in poverty in the woods by the town and came to the town in search of food. The meaning of the symbolic figures have changed over time. Originally, the bear took revenge for people who have wrongly suffered and disguised himself in the skins of goats and sheep. The hermit, a tree-like man, chose to live in the forest of his homeland rather than migrate to another area. In the past, the hermit received food for visiting homes and silently giving an omen during the festival.

Carnival, little carnival, give me a bit of salami, and if you do not want to give me that, I hope that it soon rots.

— translation of a nursery rhyme

For a period of time, and by 2013, the festival or some of its customs were not observed. Now, the carnival focuses on ecological values. The carnival is organized by the town of Satriano di Lucania in collaboration with Al Parco and the Lucano Apennine National Park. Private companies, associations, and volunteers coordinate efforts to conduct the carnival. It kicks off with a parade of costumed people from Basilicata towns Teana, Cirigliano, Aliano, Montescaglioso, San Mauro Forte, Tricarico, and Lavello on Friday night, and concludes at Abbamonte square, where there are food stands and folk music.

== Acireale ==
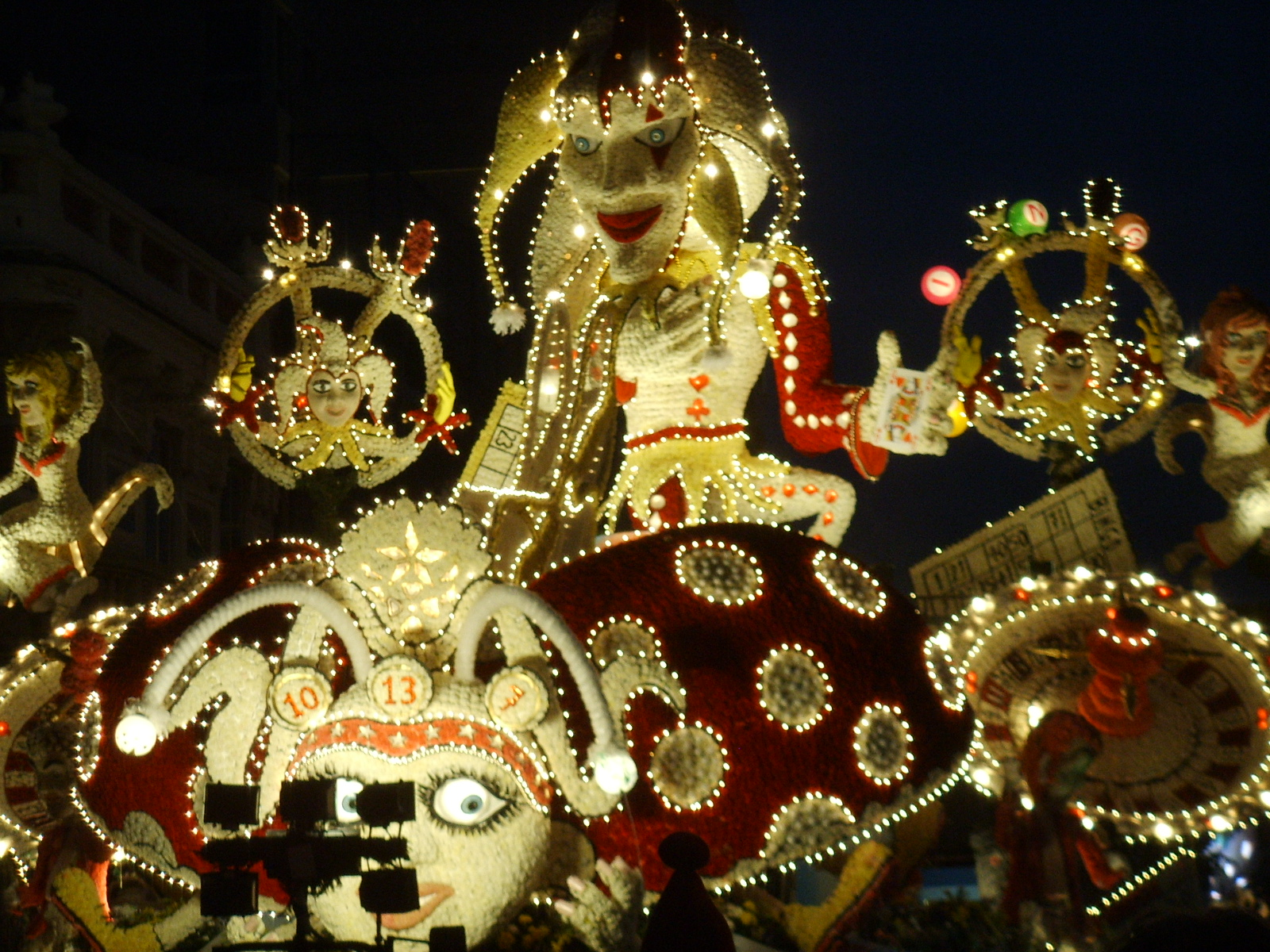
Carnival of Acireale

The Carnival of Acireale, considered one of the most important carnivals in Italy, Europe and the world, takes place every year in the city of Acireale, Sicily. Among its characteristics is the parade of allegorical and flowered floats. The parade of allegorical-grotesque papier-mâché floats takes place every year during the carnival. The floats give their show through thousands of light bulbs and lights, spectacular movements and constantly evolving scenography during the performances.

The first official document that mentions the event is a payment order from 1594. In the 17th century, it was customary to have a battle of oranges and lemons, so heartfelt that on 3 March 1612, the Criminal Court was forced to ban it to put an end to serious events that often resulted in injuries to people or caused significant damage to property. In 1693, the earthquake that devastated eastern Sicily (the 1693 Sicily earthquake) also decreed a period of mourning and for several years the traditional carnival was not held. But already at the beginning of the 18th century, the event was reborn, probably also encouraged by the moment of great excitement and hope that had been created with the post-earthquake reconstruction. Some new masks entered the scene, 'u baruni (the baron) and the very famous Manti. From 1880, the parades of allegorical floats began. Initially, they were preceded by decorated carriages of the nobles (called cassariate or landaus) and later papier-mâché carts were thought of. Papier-mâché was thought of because in the city there were many craftsmen who already used this technique for decorations.

The exquisite floats decked with fresh flowers, which give beauty and fragrance to the streets of Acireale, are largely responsible for the Carnival's reputation as one of Italy's most stunning. In the 16th century, revelers in "Acireale" used to celebrate Carnival by flinging rotten eggs and lemons, but when these activities were formally outlawed, they were replaced with far more refined traditions. Today, both floats and poets may be found at the Acireale Carnival, which is widely regarded as the "best Carnival in Sicily". In fact, it is so popular that the entire affair is recreated in August's mild summer weather. The parade of allegorical-grotesque papier-mâché floats takes place every year during the carnival. The characteristic that distinguishes them in Europe is the sophistication and the impressive use of lights and mechanisms. The floats give their show through thousands of light bulbs and lights, spectacular movements and scenography that is constantly evolving during the performances.

== Putignano ==
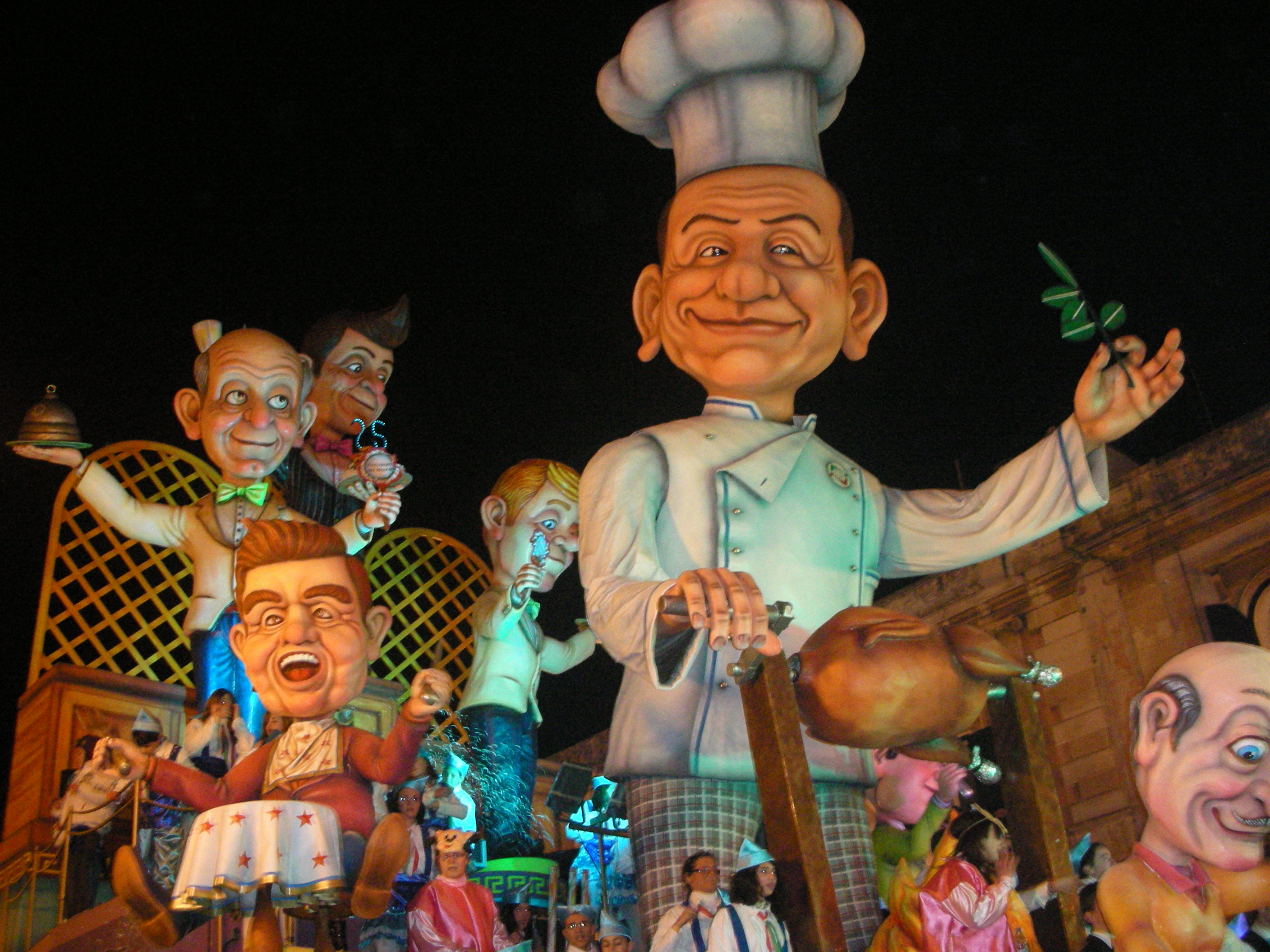
Carnival of Putignano

The Carnival of Putignano is an event that takes place annually in the city of Putignano, in Apulia. In 2025 it reached its 631st edition. The characteristic mask of the event is Farinella, which owes its name to the dish of the same name, typical of Putignano. It is organized annually by the Carnival Foundation of Putignano.

According to tradition, the Carnival of Putignano dates back to 1394, when the Saracen raids on the coasts of Apulia required the relics of the protomartyr Saint Stephen, protector of the city of Putignano, to be moved from the Abbey of Monopoli towards the hinterland, to be able to defend them more easily.

Putignano was chosen as the destination for the transfer: upon the arrival of the relics, the farmers, at that time busy with the grafting of the vine (the so-called propaggine, 'offshoot'), left the fields and joyfully joined the procession, abandoning themselves to dancing and singing. There were then some who recited jokes, verses and improvised satires in the vernacular. According to historians, the propaggini were born at that moment, still today the heart of the local carnival tradition and an event that marks the beginning of the event, every 26 December.

Certainly, we should not forget the theory of some scholars, which would have the roots of the Carnival of Putignano in the last centuries BC, at the time when the city was a colony of Magna Graecia and propitiatory rites towards the god Dionysus were frequent.

In this case, 1394 would represent the passage of "Christianization" of an already existing pagan festival. It is only in the first half of the 20th century that the artisan mastery of the country makes its entrance as protagonists in the Carnival of Putignano, putting art, passion and competence at the complete disposal of the playful carnival fun.

== Bagolino ==
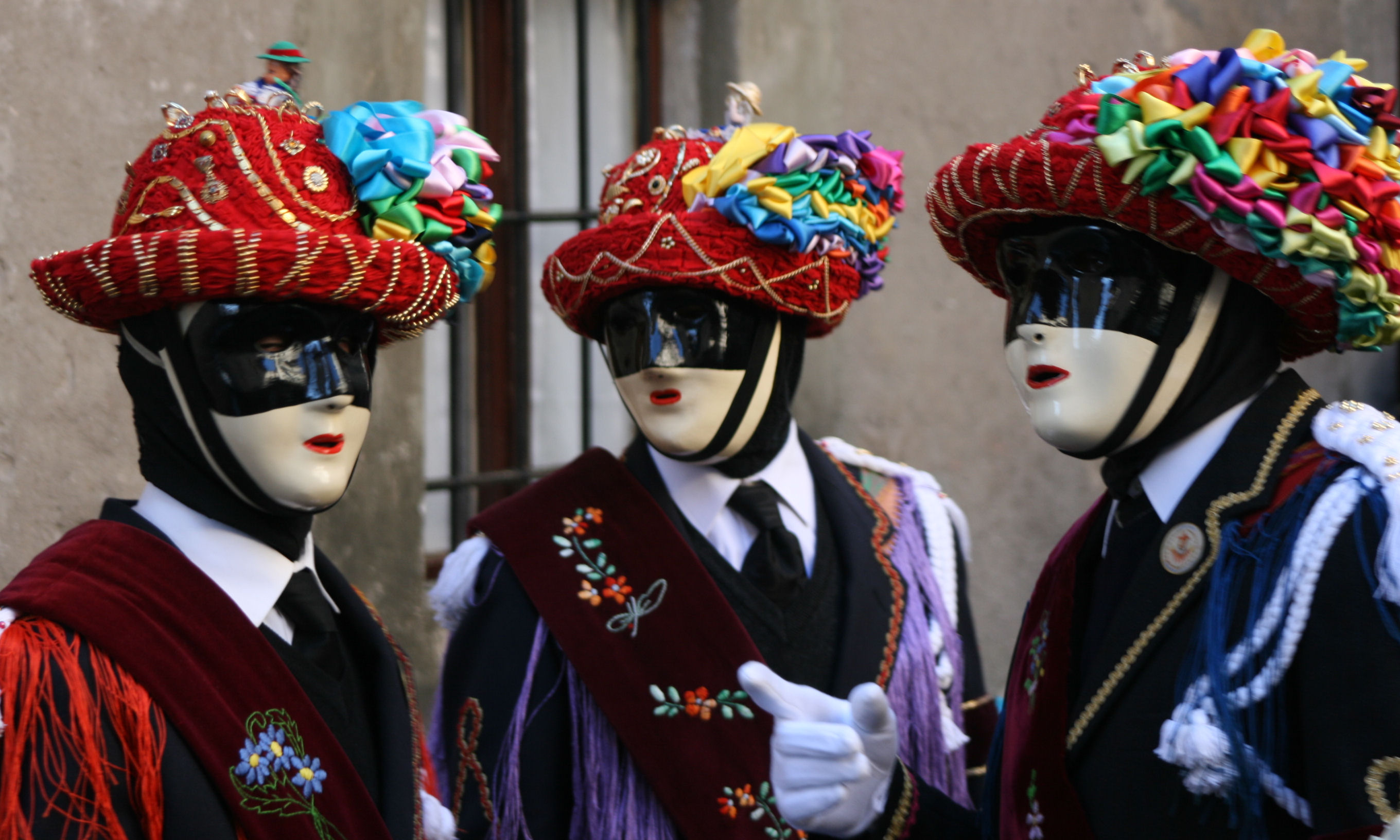
Carnival of Bagolino

The Bagolino carnival, for its typical folklore, preserved by virtue of the isolated position of the town, has acquired increasing notoriety, also attracting the attention of ethnology scholars. The festival is divided into two distinct events, animated respectively by the elegant figures of the Bälärì (dancers and musicians) and by the grotesque figures of the Màscär (masks).

The Bagolino carnival (or Bagosso carnival) dates back to at least the 16th century, as documented by writings preserved in the municipal archive. A municipal resolution of 1518 ordered the Laveno Company to be rewarded with a form of cheese for having come to cheer up the carnival celebration.

The tradition of the balarì, who perform exclusively on the Monday and Tuesday of Carnival, represents the most spectacular aspect of the Bagosso Carnival; it has attracted the attention of ethnographic studies for the originality of the music and the complexity of the dances that are performed in the streets and squares of the town.

== Cento ==
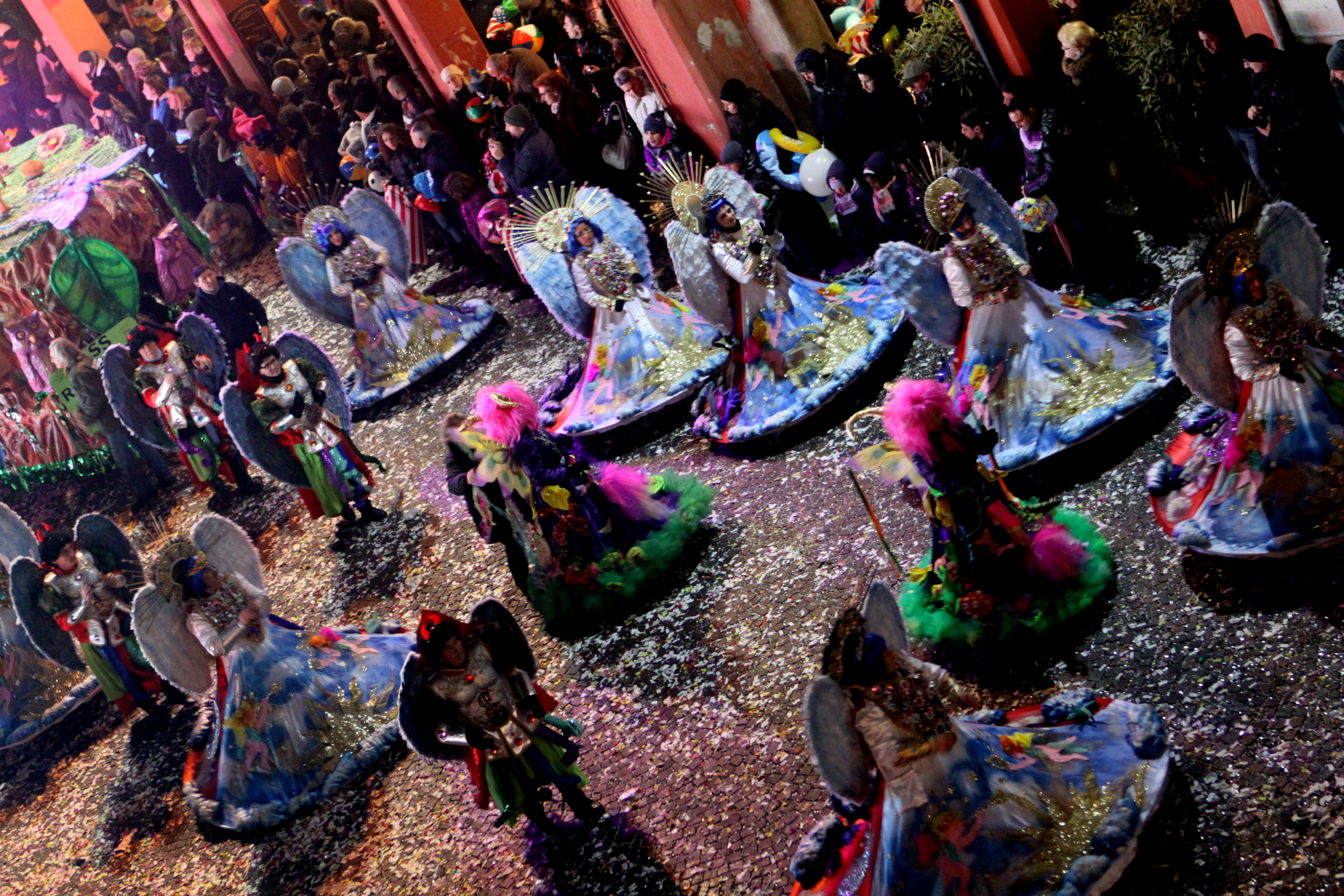
Carnival of Cento

The Carnival of Cento is a historic carnival that takes place in the city of the same name, in Emilia-Romagna. The Carnival in Cento has ancient origins, as demonstrated by some frescoes by the 17th-century painter Giovanni Francesco Barbieri known as Guercino (Cento, 1591-Bologna, 1666), which depict scenes of the festivities and carnival celebrations in the city.

Since 1990, the event has become an important folkloristic event, thanks to the twinning with the Carnival of Rio de Janeiro where for some years masks of the winning float of the previous edition paraded and the constant presence of Italian and international entertainment personalities.

Carnival in Cento usually takes place on 5 Sundays. The parades begin in the early afternoon. The carnival floats pass through the historic center several times accompanied by music and groups of masked figures engaged in choreographies. Peculiar is the rich jet of inflatables and stuffed toys thrown from each float to the spectators. A stage is set up in Piazza Guercino, where the Patron of the Carnival presents the event always accompanied by famous faces from the world of entertainment.

== Rome ==
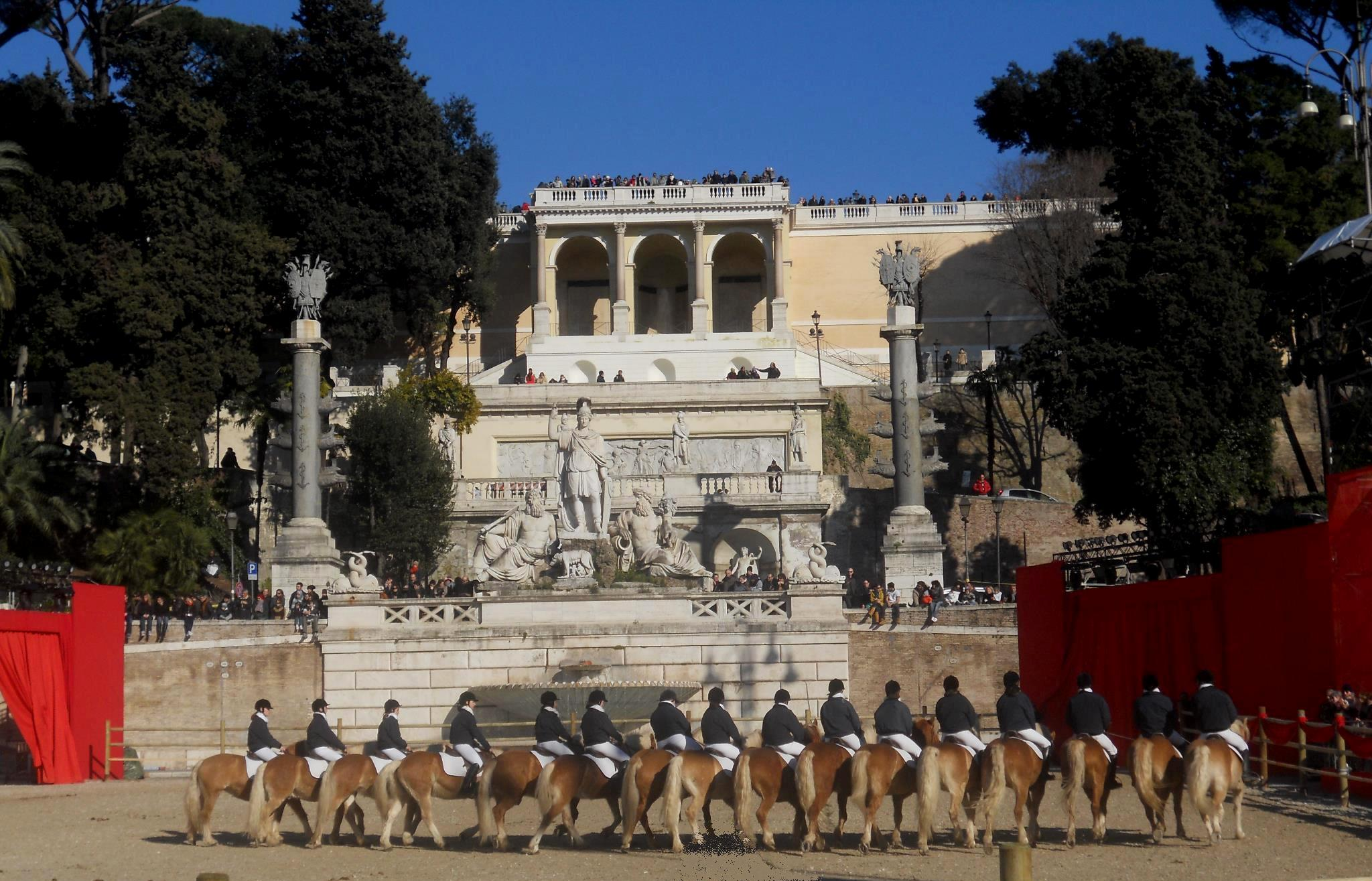
Carnival of Rome

The Carnival of Rome, or Roman Carnival, is celebrated in Rome during the period of the year preceding Lent; strongly inspired by the Saturnalia of the ancient Romans, the carnival was one of the main celebrations of papal Rome.

The origins of the Roman carnival date back to the Saturnalia, religious festivities of ancient Rome characterized by public entertainment, orgiastic rites, sacrifices, dances and the presence of masks.

Starting from the 10th century, carnival celebrations took place on Mount Testaccio, with the intent of recalling the ancient Roman festivity. From the mid-15th century, the games, by order of Pope Paul II, took place in Via Lata (now Via del Corso).

The main event was the race of the Barbary horses: many nobles, royals, artists and travellers flocked to Rome for the race and left traces of it in their writings; it was also a recurring theme in numerous lively prints and paintings. It was held annually, with some exceptions, for example in 1829 for the death of Pope Leo XII.

The Carnival of Rome in Via del Corso in 1836. In the background, you can see the Flaminio Obelisk in Piazza del Popolo. A few years after the unification of Italy, in 1874, King Victor Emmanuel II decided to abolish this event forever due to the death of a young man who was watching the race and was run over and killed: this fact thus marked the beginning of the decline of the Roman Carnival.

== Sartiglia of Oristano ==
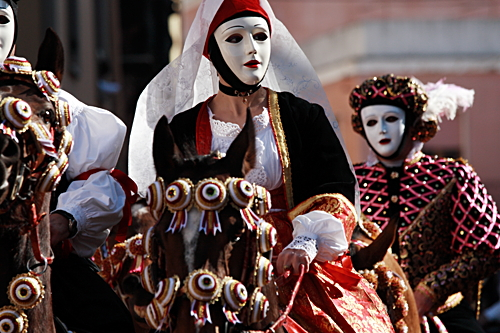
Sartiglia in Oristano, Sardinia

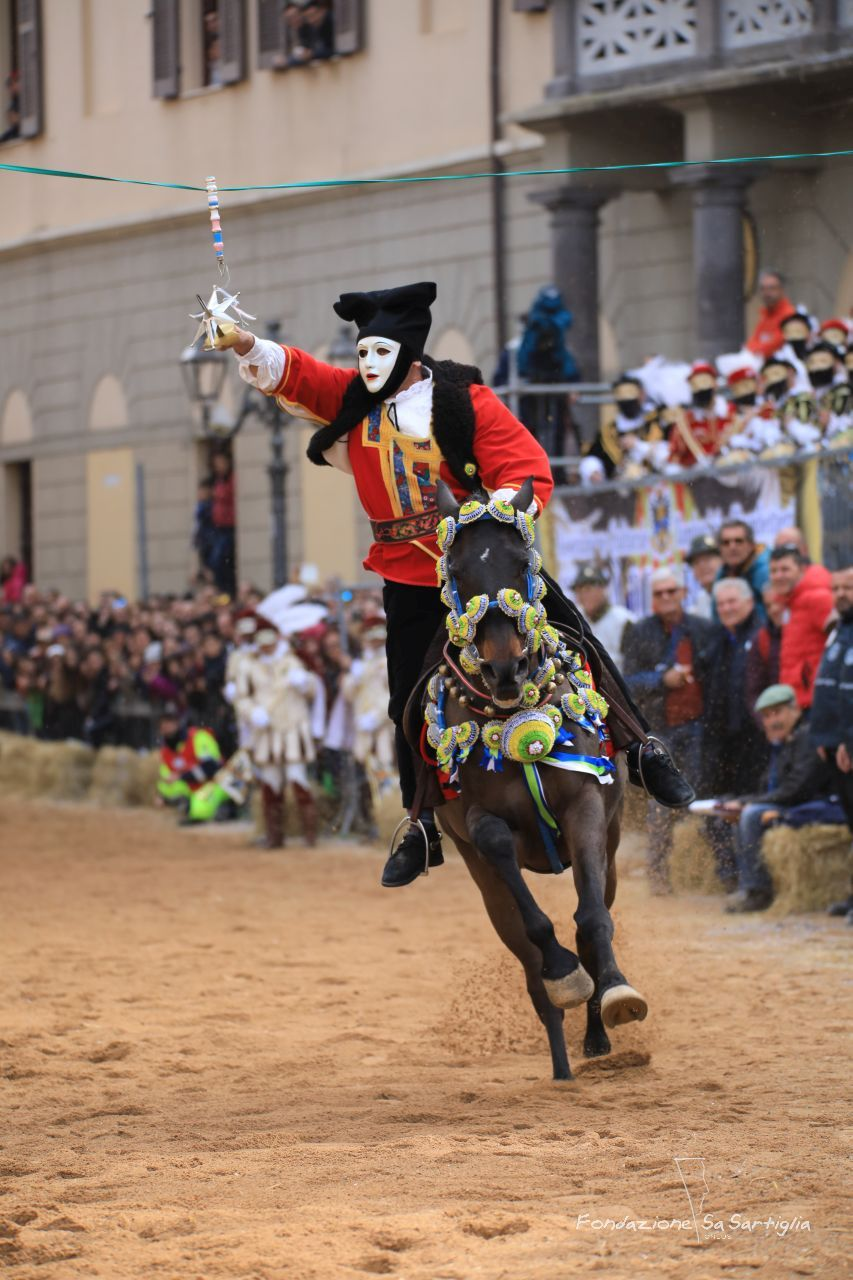
Corsa alla stella ('Race to the Star') of the Sartiglia of Oristano

The Sartiglia is a large race held on the last Sunday and Tuesday of Carnival in the city of Oristano, where Carnival and Sartiglia are practically synonymous. It is one of the oldest equestrian events still held in the Mediterranean area and among the most choreographic forms of carnival in Sardinia. It echoes rites of agrarian regeneration.

The term Sartiglia derives from the Spanish Sortija, in turn deriving from the Latin sorticula, meaning ring, and retains the diminutive sors, luck. The origins of the joust lie in ancient military tournaments, in the race for the star with sword and sabre that has been handed down over the years. It consists of the knights attempting to hit the target, a star, hanging from a green ribbon.

The introduction of military games used to train militias in Europe probably occurred thanks to the Crusaders around the 11th century, who in turn had learned the practice from their Saracen enemies. The race underwent many evolutions and was preserved with some variations. Over time and with the introduction of gunpowder, the lance fell into disuse and equestrian jousts were used only as an exercise for cavalry recruits. During the 15th and 16th centuries, equestrian races lost their military value and were transformed into real public shows. The Oristano joust also falls within the scope of ring races offered to the public by sovereigns, feudal lords or trade corporations on the occasion of special festivities.

There are no medieval documents that report news about the Sartiglia, however the visits of the judges of Arborea to the lords of the Italian municipalities of the 13th and 14th centuries as well as the stays in the Iberian Peninsula, were very frequent and this leads to think that the sovereigns of Arborea knew the military training games and that also in Oristano the nobles tried their hand at horse racing with sword and lance. Over the centuries the practice of the Sartiglia remained alive first as a manifestation of the noble classes, then of the bourgeoisie, finally involving previously excluded social strata, thus becoming an expression of life, customs and popular culture.

During the centuries of Spanish domination we have evidence of equestrian jousts in the Royal Cities of Oristano, Cagliari, Sassari and Iglesias, organized to celebrate important events such as the ascension to the throne of a new sovereign, royal weddings or important festivities of the liturgical calendar.

The oldest evidence of the Oristano race is preserved in a council register dated 1547-48, found in the Historical Archive of the Municipality of Oristano. The document records the payment made by the Royal City to Nicolao Pinna for the supply of a black cloth used on the occasion of a Sortilla. The race was organized in honor of Emperor Charles V, presumably in 1546.

== Tempio Pausania ==
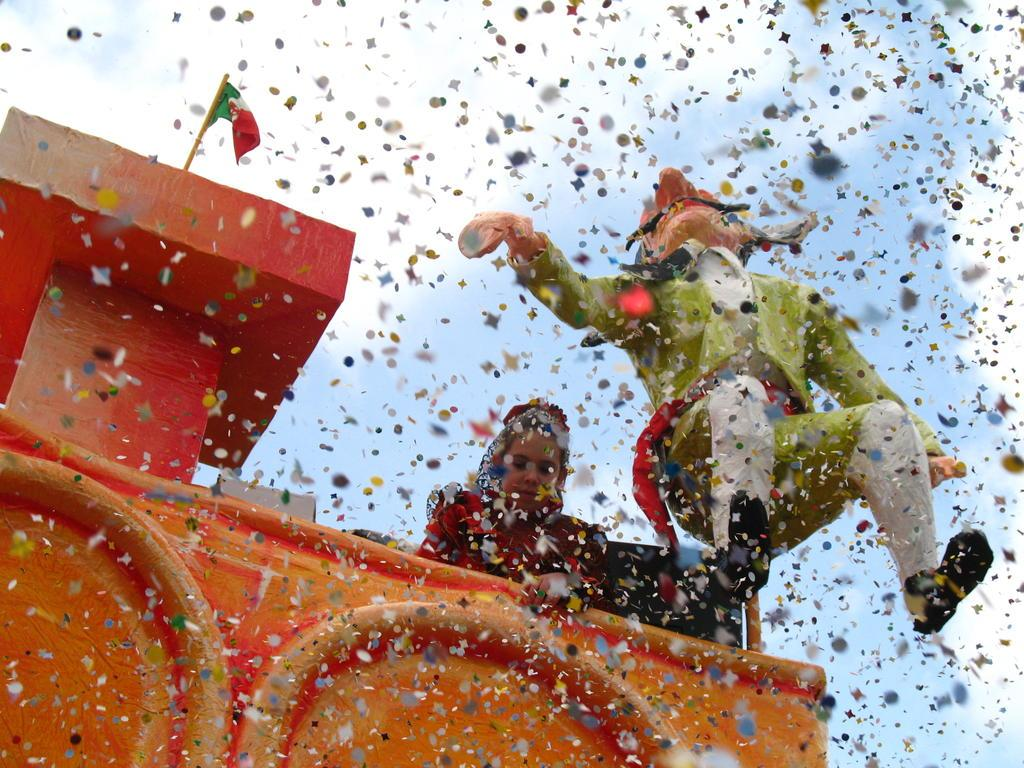
Carnival of Tempio Pausania

The Carnival of Tempio Pausania (in Sardinian Carrasciali Timpiesu) is a folkloristic event that takes place during the carnival in Tempio Pausania, a town in the north of Sardinia. It is the most important allegorical Carnival of the island. On the occasion of the 2018 edition, the Ministry of Cultural Heritage and Activities and Tourism placed the Carrasciali Timpiesu in sixth place for beauty in Italy.

The event, which annually attracts tens of thousands of participants and spectators, has consisted since the 1960s of evocative allegorical parades that pass through the historic center, whose floats mainly represent themes among which political and social satire prevails, crowned by the long and fascinating tradition that drives the main allegorical Carnival of Sardinia. The references to masks, traditions and typical dances dating back to the 18th century stand out. During the "six days" of the Carrasciali Timpiesu, which begins every Fat Thursday of the year and ends on Fat Tuesday, a series of daily and night-time events follow one another, among which the four main parades prevail: the initial parade on Thursday, two intermediate parades on Sunday and Monday (the latter dedicated to children) and the closing parade on Tuesday, which ends with the trial and burning in the square of "His Majesty King George", a float that represents the sovereign of the Tempio Carnival. The staging of numerous masked balls and engaging dances in the city, in conjunction with the parades, makes the Carrasciali Timpiesu unique in its kind, which every year attracts participants and spectators from all over the island.

The Tempio Carnival has ancient origins. In ancient times, from the 17th to the 19th century, it represented a great event that crowned the period in which the workers of the land could rest: the two months that go from the Epiphany (in Sardinian Li Tre Irrè) to the Saturday of the week that follows Fat Thursday (in Sardinian Carrascialoni, the day of the preparation of the traditional pentolaccia), rich in dancing, singing and feasting.

== Santhià ==
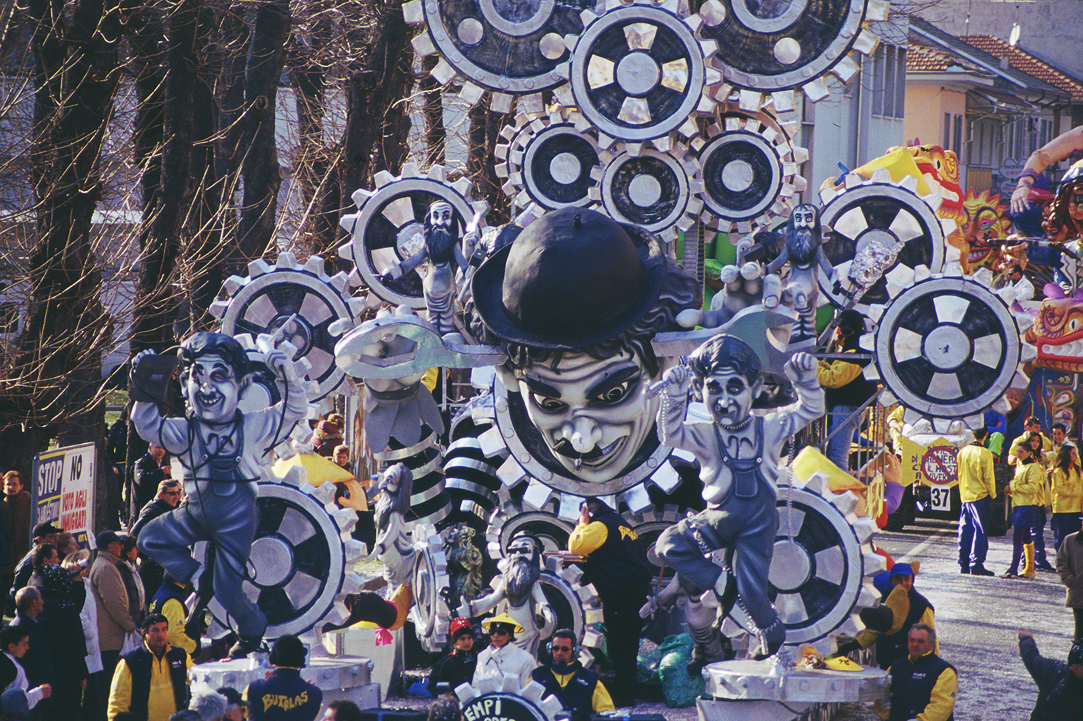
Carnival of Santhià

The Carnival of Santhià, awarded the "Representative Award Medal del President of Republic Giorgio Napolitano" and the Patronage of the Ministry of Culture is a historical allegorical event.

Its origins can be traced back to the first half of the 14th century, a period in which the Abbadia, a lay association of young people, promoted parties and dances during the carnival period. Other writings and documents actually attest that over the centuries in Santhià such a youth association existed. In these writings, reference is made to the Santhià Carnival as an event whose origins are lost in the mists of time: for example, there is documented evidence of a "reminder" (with a relative fine), addressed to the young people of the Abbadia of Santhià, who were condemned, in 1430, to pay 25 soldi. The habit, we read in the document, dated back to earlier times and was tolerated.

Other documents dating back to the advent of the Duchy of Savoy (15th century) report that restrictions were introduced to mitigate the excesses of the "reversal of habits" typical of the Carnival period. These texts also refer to the fact that in Santhià Carnival, with its traditions and excesses, had been a consolidated habit for time immemorial. Finally, a document dated 1893, in the possession of the Pro Loco, states that that year they were celebrating "the 8th centenary of the Antica Società Fagiuolesca", which would allow us to backdate its existence to at least 1093. The sum of these sources makes the Santhià event the oldest Carnival in Piedmont.

== Lachera of Rocca Grimalda ==
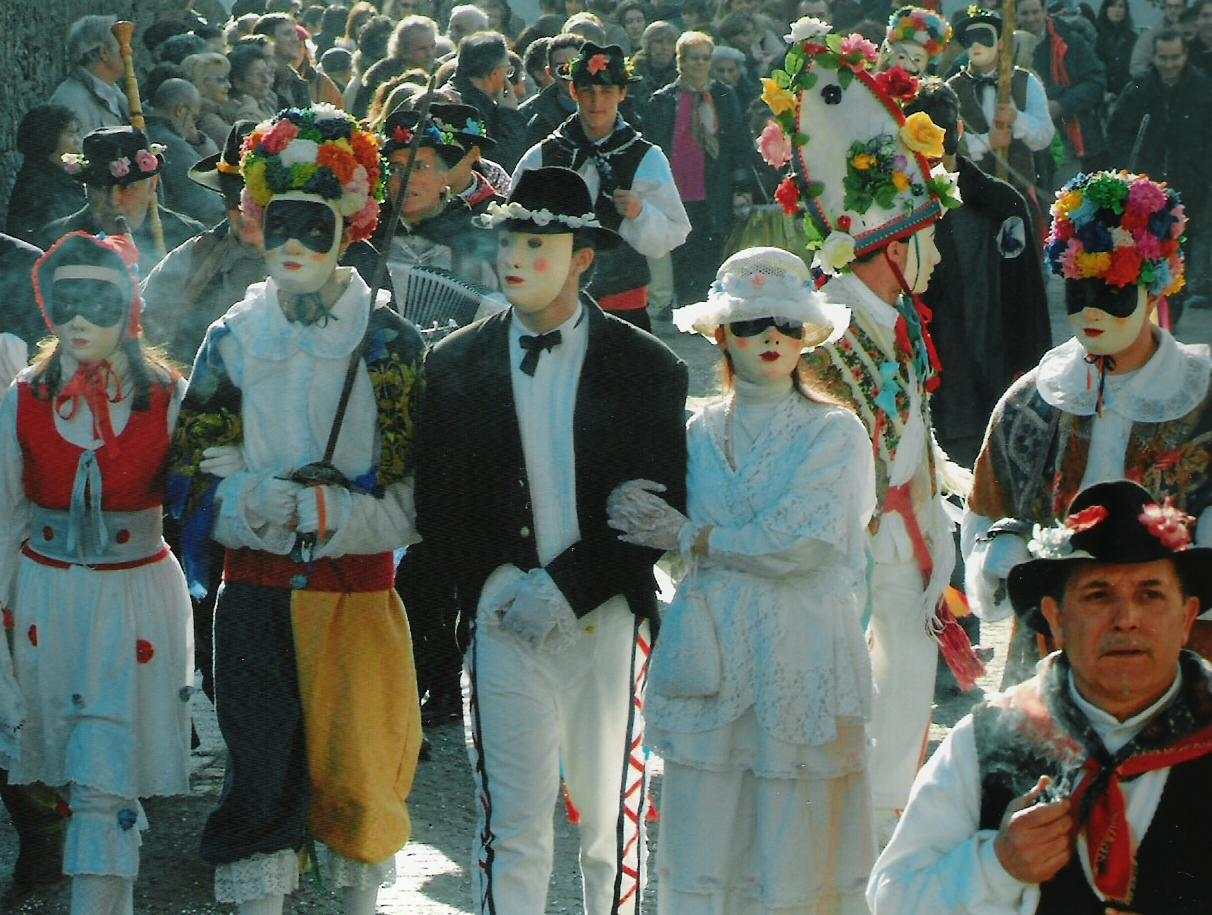
Lachera of Rocca Grimalda

The Lachera of Rocca Grimalda is a carnival ritual that takes place in the municipality of Rocca Grimalda, in the Province of Alessandria. It essentially consists of a dance with hints of theater where the characters fixed by tradition confront and interact with each other with different masks and costumes that recall different roles and intrinsic meanings.

The first photographs of the festival date back to the beginning of the 20th century, but its interpretation as a rite of foundation of the community is believed to be much older, as seems to be demonstrated by the maintenance of elements whose explanation had by now been forgotten, but which have revealed unexpected links with other similar representations widespread in the Alps, in Italy and in other carnival-related events held in Europe.

The Lachera probably originated as a pagan spring and rural rite, but over the centuries its forgotten original meaning has been associated with numerous legends that have accompanied and now permeated the rite itself. The Mask Museum in Rocca Grimalda. According to tradition, the origins of the rite date back to a courageous married couple, who during the Middle Ages rebelled against a tyrant who claimed to exercise the ius primae noctis; the feudal lord sent his henchmen to suppress the revolt but the soldiers soon went over to the side of the local population who all participated in the rebellion, proudly parading through the streets of the town as a sign of defiance.

== Ambrosian carnival ==
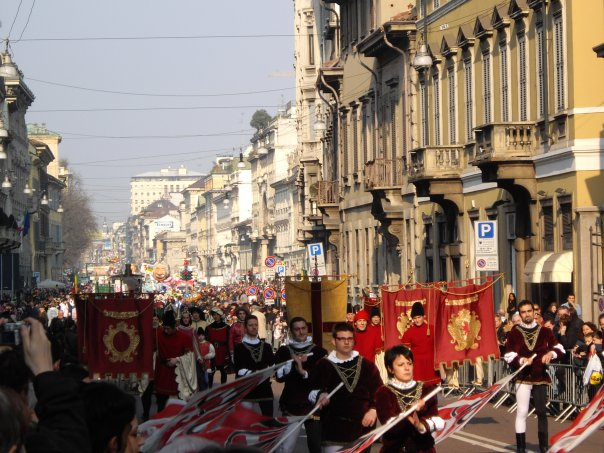
Ambrosian carnival in Milan

The Ambrosian Rite (Italian: rito ambrosiano) is a Latin liturgical rite of the Catholic Church and the Eastern Orthodox Church (specifically The Divine Liturgy of Saint Ambrose). The rite is named after Saint Ambrose, a bishop of Milan in the fourth century. It is used by around five million Catholics in the greater part of the Archdiocese of Milan (excluding Monza, Treviglio and Trezzo sull'Adda), in some parishes of the Diocese of Como, Bergamo, Novara, Lodi, in the Diocese of Lugano, Canton of Ticino, Switzerland, less prominently in some Western Rite orthodox parishes and on special occasions of other jurisdictions. In the most part of the Archdiocese of Milan, the Carnival ends on the first Sunday of Lent; the last day of Carnival is Saturday, 4 days after the Tuesday on which it ends where the Roman Rite is observed.

Tradition has it that Bishop Saint Ambrose was on a pilgrimage and had announced his return for Carnival, to celebrate the first rites of Lent in the city. The people of Milan waited for him, prolonging Carnival until his arrival, postponing the Ash Wednesday rite that in the Milanese archdiocese takes place on the first Sunday of Lent. In reality, the difference is due to the fact that in ancient times Lent began everywhere on Sunday; the days from Ash Wednesday to the following Sunday were introduced into the Roman rite to bring the days of effective fasting to forty, taking into account that Sundays had never been days of fasting. The first documented manifestations date back to the 4th century at the time of Saint Ambrose.

The uses and customs that involve the overturning of the social order and hierarchies to make way for the overthrow of classes, the caricature and mockery of the noble classes and the clergy through the use of satire and criticism, the burlesque imitation of lifestyles through mockery and jokes, irony, parody and comedy, the regimented debauchery in the political and religious field through processions, parades and masked balls. The celebrations are accompanied by abundant feasts and generous libations, a prelude to a long period of penance based on Christian principles such as abstinence, fasting, atonement, repentance, confession and reconciliation, forgiveness. Thus the forerunner of the modern Carnival is determined, which finds its origins in Milan.

== Dates of observance ==
- 2024 - 11 February
- 2025 - 2 March
- 2026 - 15 February
- 2027 - 7 February
- 2028 - 27 February

== Gallery ==
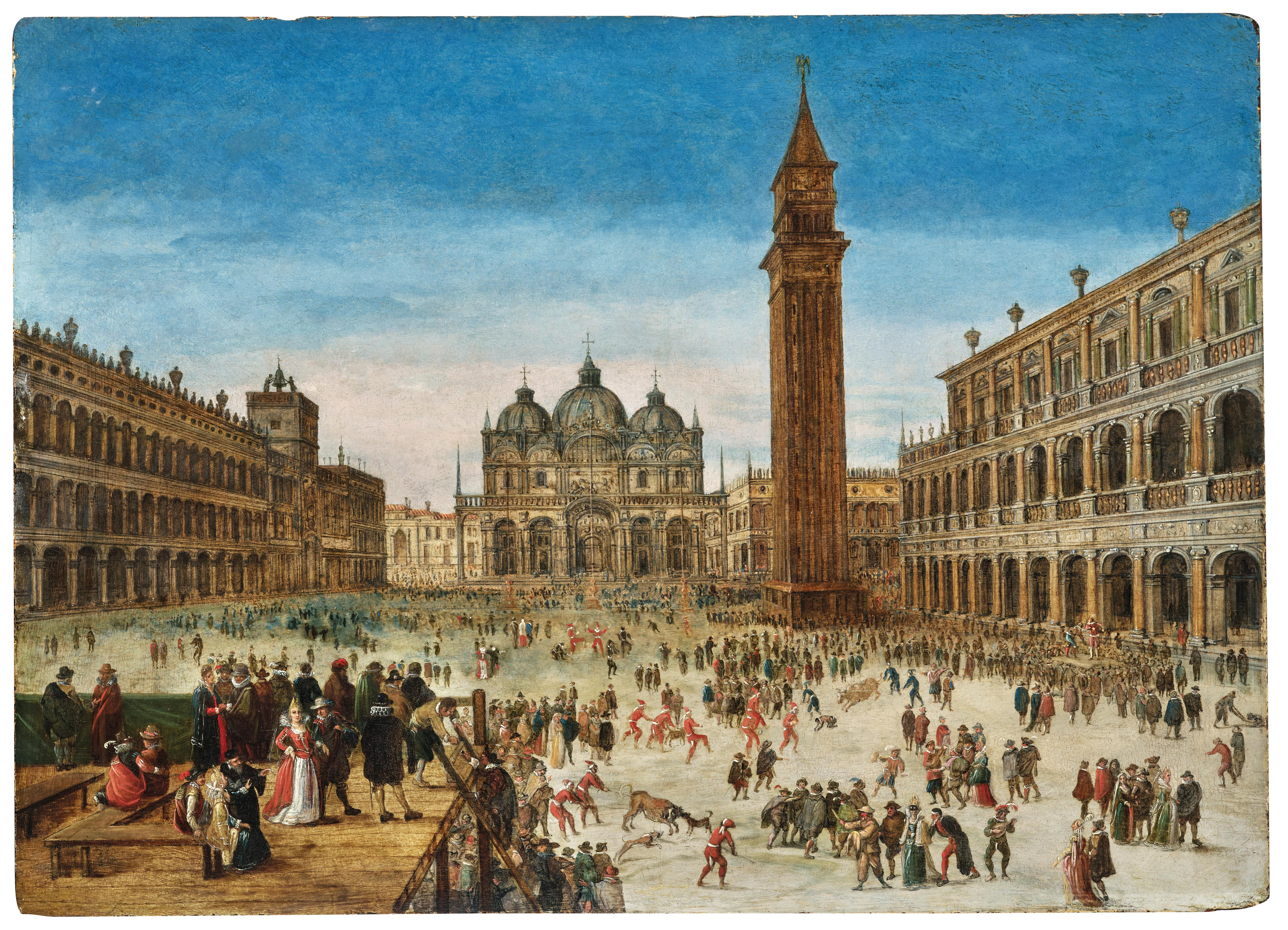
Carnival of Venice, by Louis de Caullery, before 1622

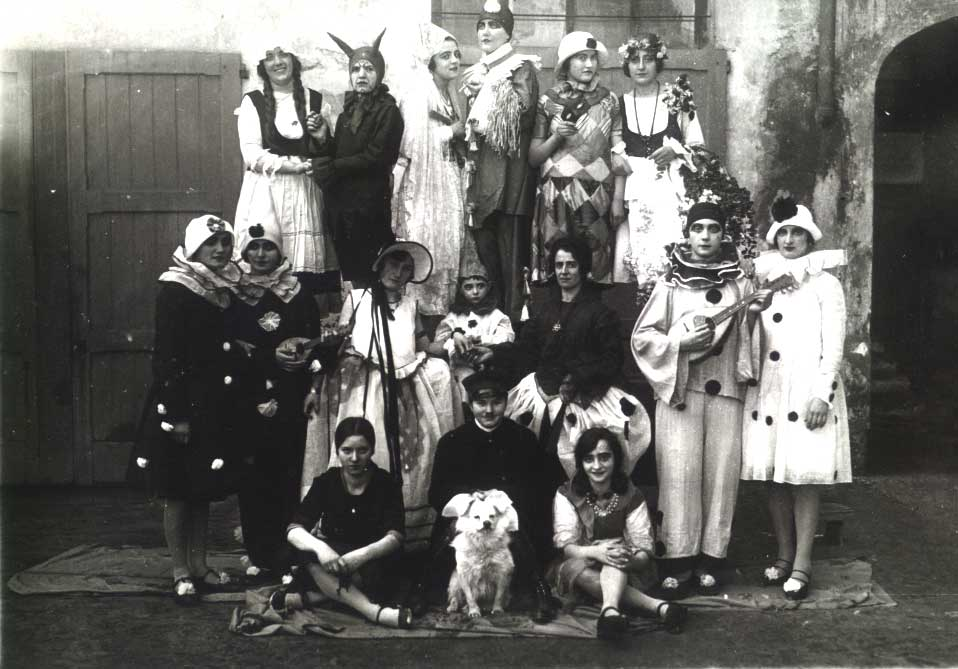
Ambrosian carnival in Milan between 1914 and 1920

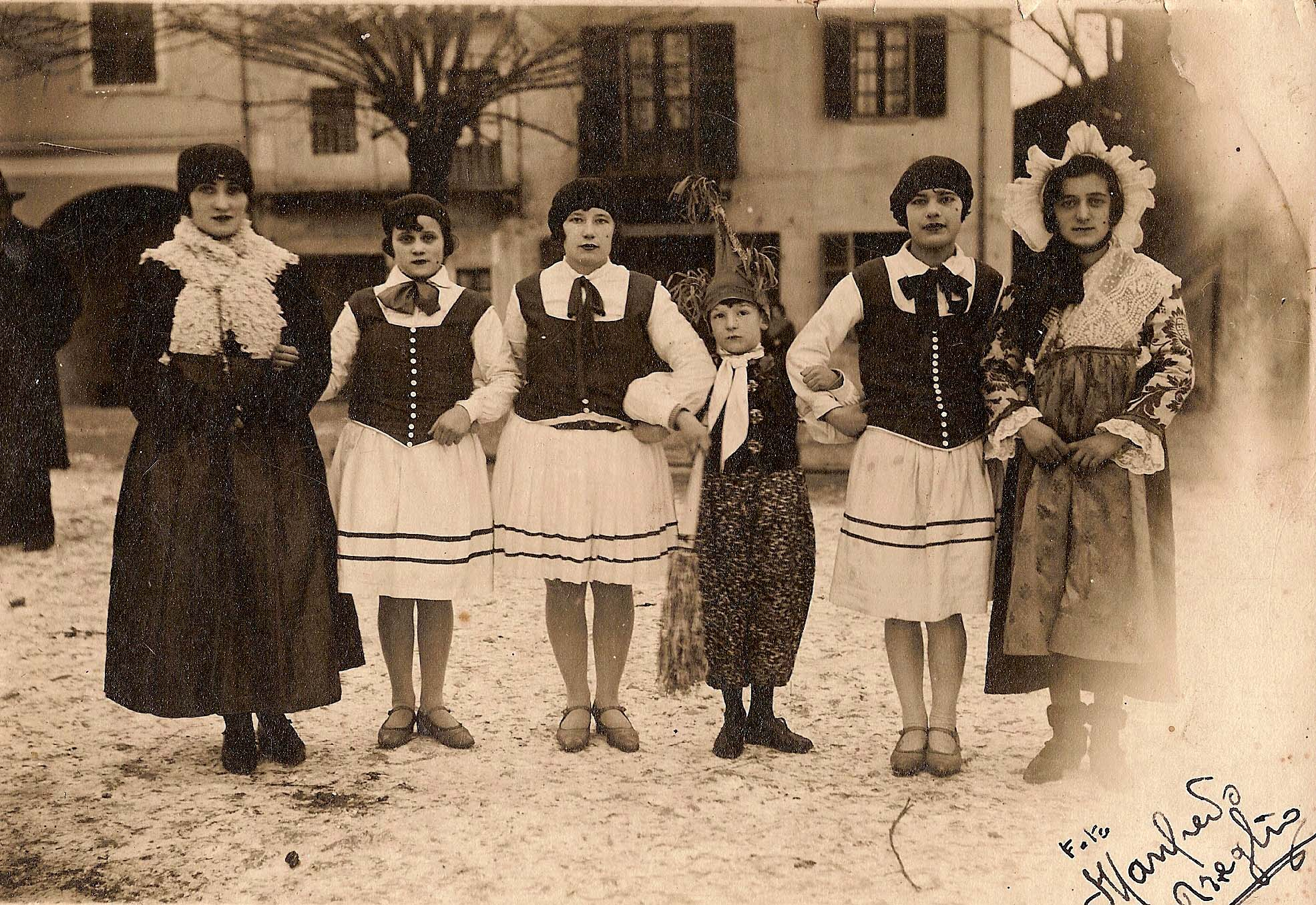
Carnival in the square of Azeglio, near Ivrea, 1929

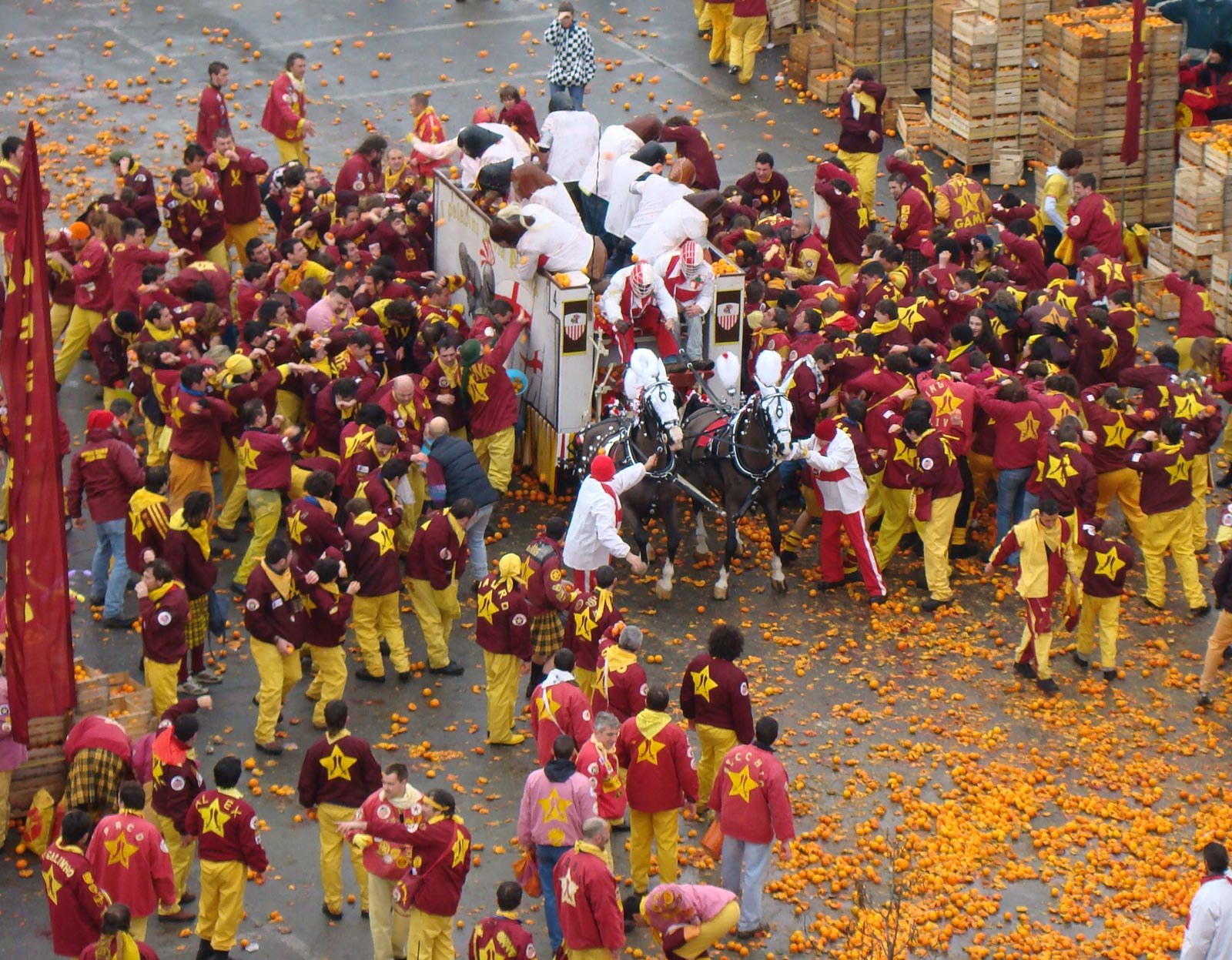
Carnival of Ivrea, Italy: the "battle of the oranges"

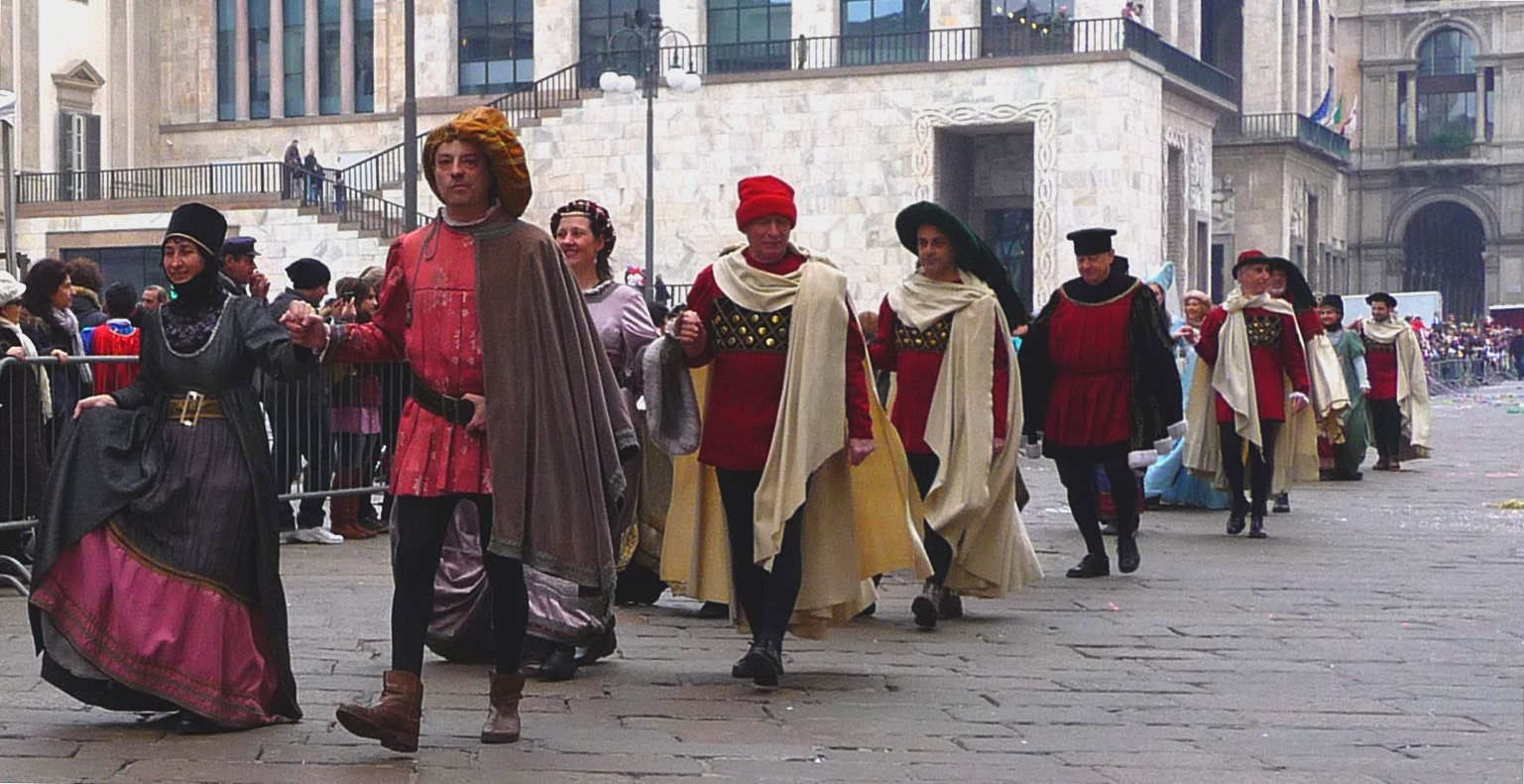
Ambrosian carnival in Milan

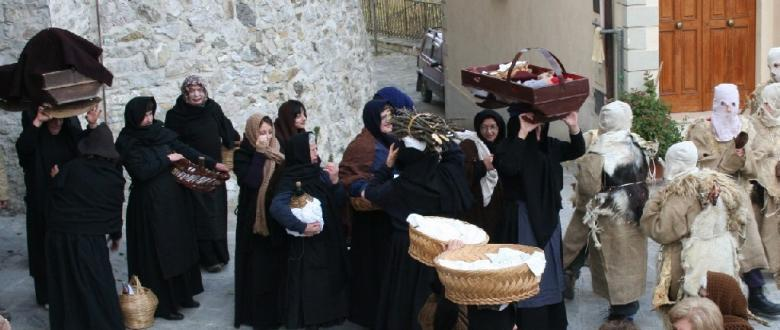
Carnival of Satriano di Lucania

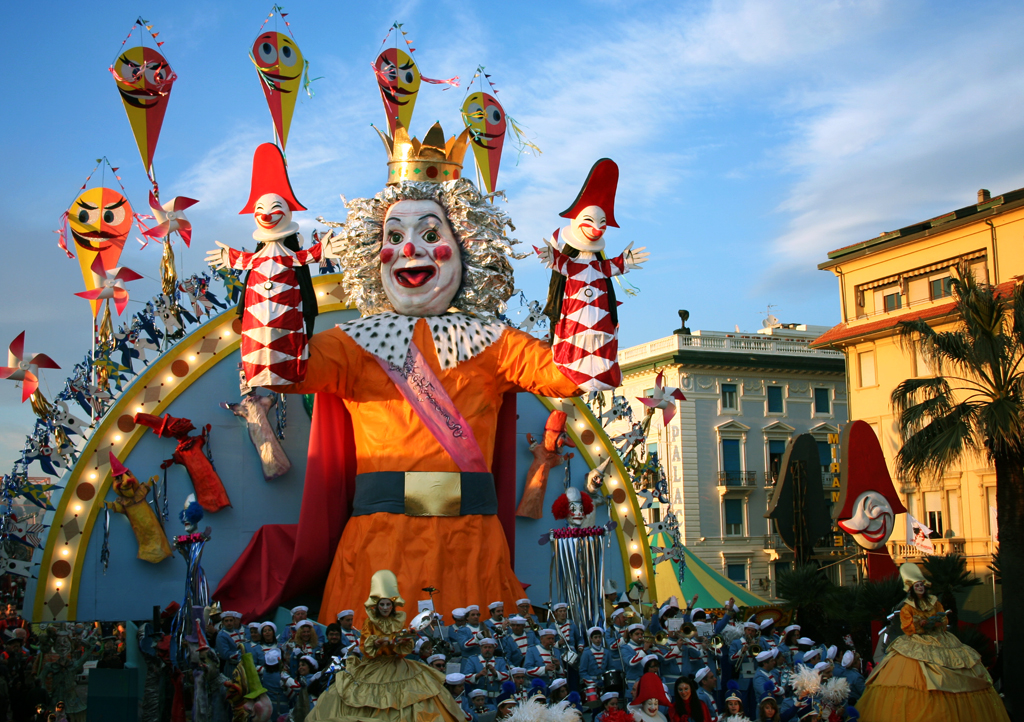
Carnival of Viareggio

== See also ==
- Carnival of Venice
- Carnival of Viareggio
- Carnival of Ivrea
- Carnival of Foiano della Chiana
- Carnival of Satriano di Lucania

== Bibliography ==
- Mussio, Gina. "Carnevale in Italy: What It Is and Where to Celebrate." Ciao Andiamo, Ciao Andiamo, 7 Dec. 2021, https://ciaoandiamo.com/carnevale-in-italy-what-it-is-and-where-to-celebrate/.
- "Most Famous Carnival Celebrations in Italy." Edited by FireBird Tours, Firebird Tours ®, FireBirdTours, 11 Oct. 2022, https://www.firebirdtours.com/blog/most-famous-carnival-celebrations-italy.
- Savarese, Maria Rosaria. "Carnevale in Italy - All You Need to Know about Carnival." Learn Italian Go, Maria Rosaria Savarese Https://Learnitaliango.com/Wp-Content/Uploads/2019/09/Learn-Italian-Go-Logo.png, 26 Feb. 2021, https://learnitaliango.com/carnevale-in-italy/.
