= Carnival of Viareggio =

Italian carnival celebration

Carnival of Viareggio Carnevale di Viareggio
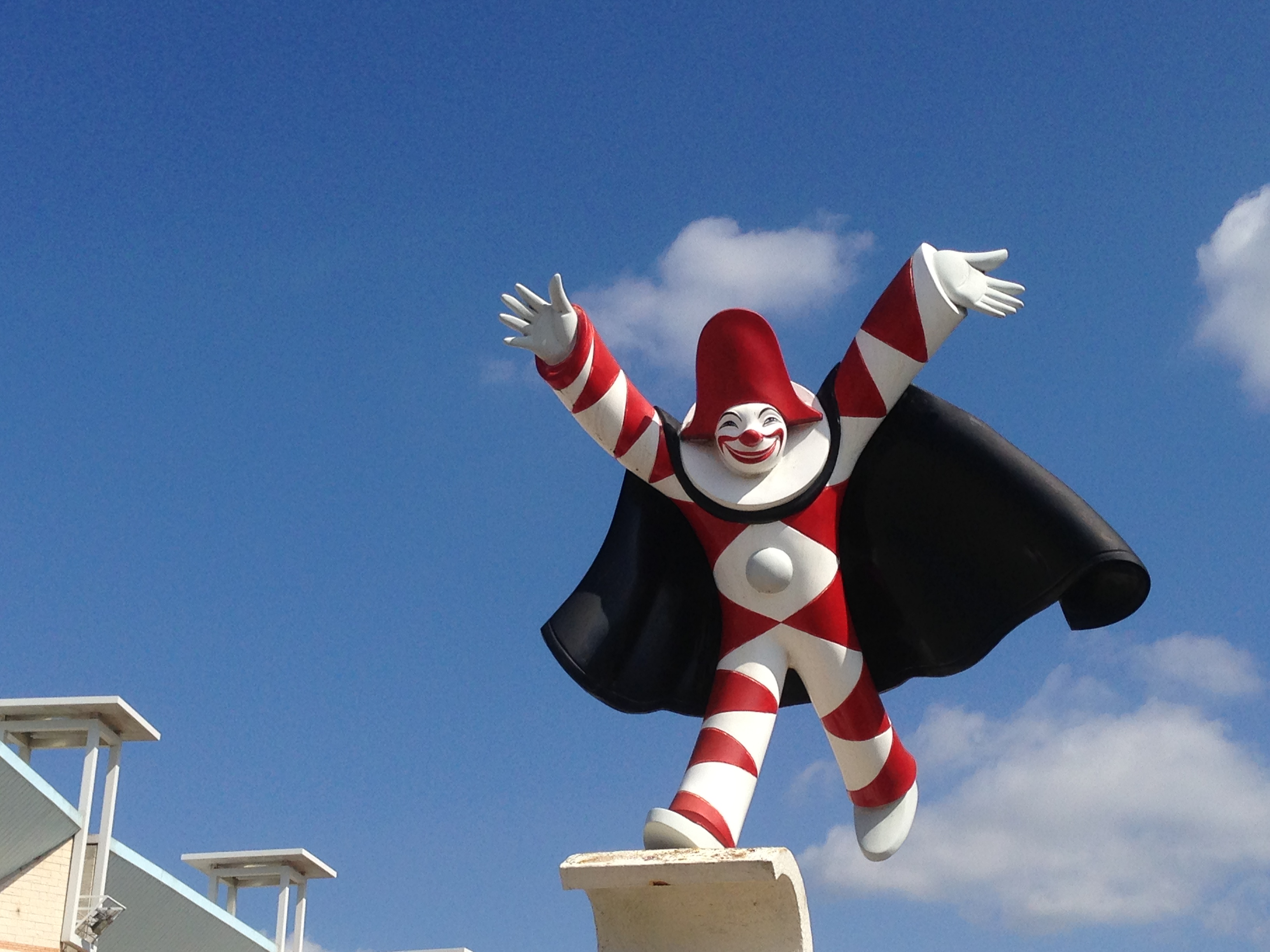
- Burlamacco, mascot of the Carnival of Viareggio, at Cittadella del Carnevale di Viareggio
- Status: Active
- Genre: Carnival
- Date: February - March
- Frequency: Annually
- Location: Viareggio
- Coordinates: 43.870516°N 10.241485°E
- Country: Italy
- Years active: 152
- Inaugurated: 1873 (modern event)
- Most recent: February 9, 2025
- Attendance: 600 000
- Organiser: Viareggio Carnival Foundation
- Website: viareggio.ilcarnevale.com/en/

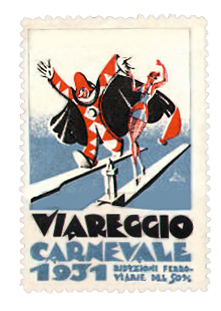
Burlamacco and Ondina, Viareggio Carnevale 1931, cinderella stamp

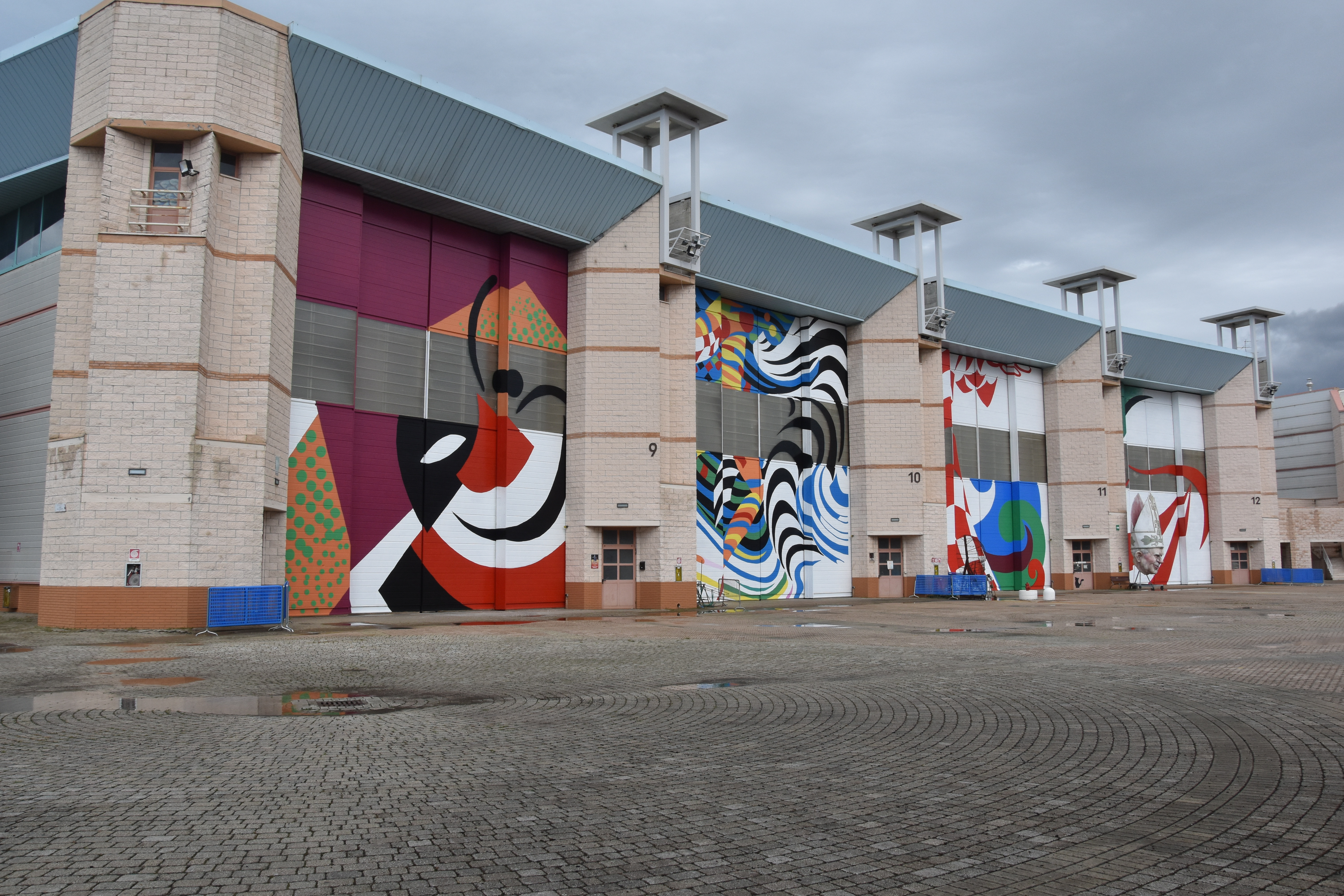
Cittadella del Carnevale di Viareggio

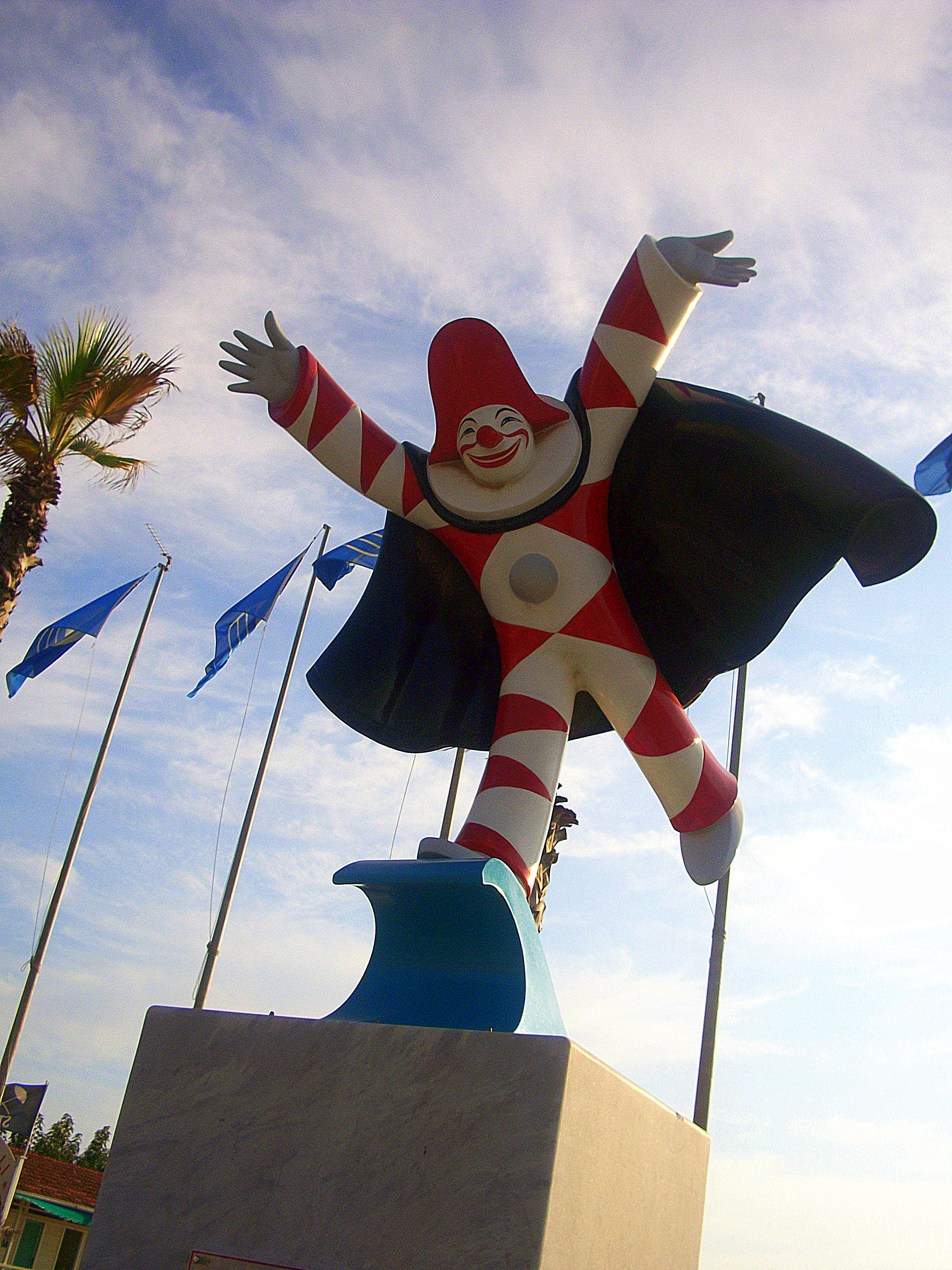
Burlamacco statue, Belvedere delle Maschere, Viareggio

The Carnival of Viareggio (Italian: Carnevale di Viareggio) is a carnival event annually held in the Tuscan city of Viareggio, Italy.

== Overview ==
Its main characteristic is given by the parade of floats and masks, usually made of paper-pulp, depicting caricatures of popular people, such as politicians, showmen, and sportsmen; the parade is held on the Viareggio avenue located alongside the local beach. Every year, the Carnevale di Viareggio attracts more than 500,000 spectators.

Carnival celebrations are scheduled every weekend night in the city's different quarters or Rioni with the best known bars, restaurants, discos and hotels in Versilia hosting all-night colourful masked parties. Additionally, during the four-week celebration, plays in vernacular language are staged around the city. The carnival has papier-mâché gargantuan allegorical floats with the largest ones weighing about 40 st (560 lb; 254 kg) and reaching 14 m (46 ft). The Carnival Giant Float Parades take place along a 2-kilometre-long (2,000 m) ring set aside Viareggio's Liberty era boardwalk, best known as La Passeggiata.

== History ==
The first Viareggio Carnival parade was held in 1873, when some wealthy middle-class men decided to organize a parade of floats adorned with flowers; a number of local citizens, as a sign of protest, then decided to put on masks in order to show their refusal of high taxes they were forced to pay. The first float to win the parade, in 1883, was named I Quattro Mori ('The Four Moors'), an accurate representation of the Livorno statue of the same name. The official mascot of the Viareggio Carnival is a Burlamacco, first depicted in 1931 by Uberto Bonetti. Since 2001, all the floats are built in an apposite seat, called Cittadella del Carnevale ('Carnival Citadel').

The Carnival stopped being held during the First World War and only resumed in 1921. It stopped again during the Second World War and resumed in 1946. From that point on, it grew in popularity.

In 1925, for the very first time, local sculptor Antonio d'Arliano employed the paper mould technique on iron and wood scaffolding, thus changing forever the way the structure of Carnival floats would be made. Since then, the use of papier-mâché has become an integral element in the construction of these giant allegorical floats.

In 2019, the Carnival parade gained international attention for a float depicting then U.S. President Donald Trump dressed as the Emperor from Warhammer 40,000. Many floats had satirized Trump, Vladimir Putin, and Kim Jong Un at previous parades.

== Cittadella del Carnevale di Viareggio ==
The Cittadella del Carnevale di Viareggio complex was inaugurated in 2001 and is dedicated to Carnival floats and masks. It houses sixteen large hangars and workshops where the giant floats are built, a workshop where the art of papier-mâché is taught, museum, photo and film archive and document center; the Papier Mâché Museum where floats are stored and the Museum of the Carnival.

== Mascot ==
Burlamacco the clown-like figure and Ondina his companion, preside over the Carnival in the Tuscan town of Viareggio. Burlamacco, the town's mascot, was first depicted in 1931 by Uberto Bonetti; a competition had been held for the design of the mascot and his was the winning entry. He had chosen the red and white of the outfit from the traditional colours of the umbrellas on the beach at Viareggio and the name came 8 years later; it is derived from the Burlamacca River.

To this day Burlamacco remains a feature of the Carnival and there is a statue of him, by local artist Fabrizio Galli, on a model by Renato Galli, all the year round on Belvedere delle Maschere, in Viareggio.

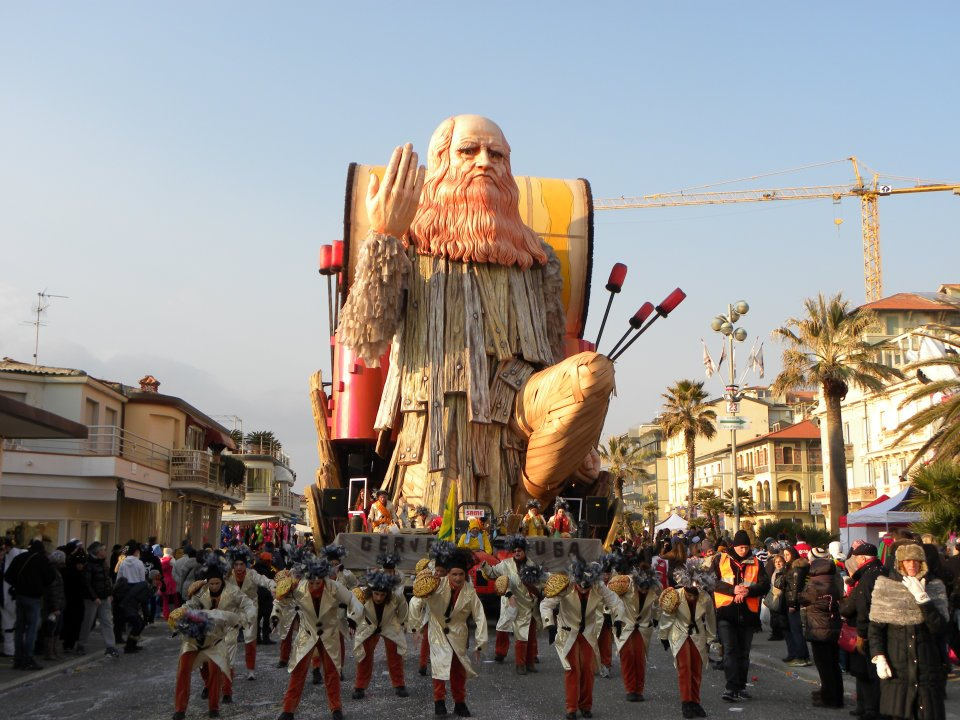
Carnival 2012

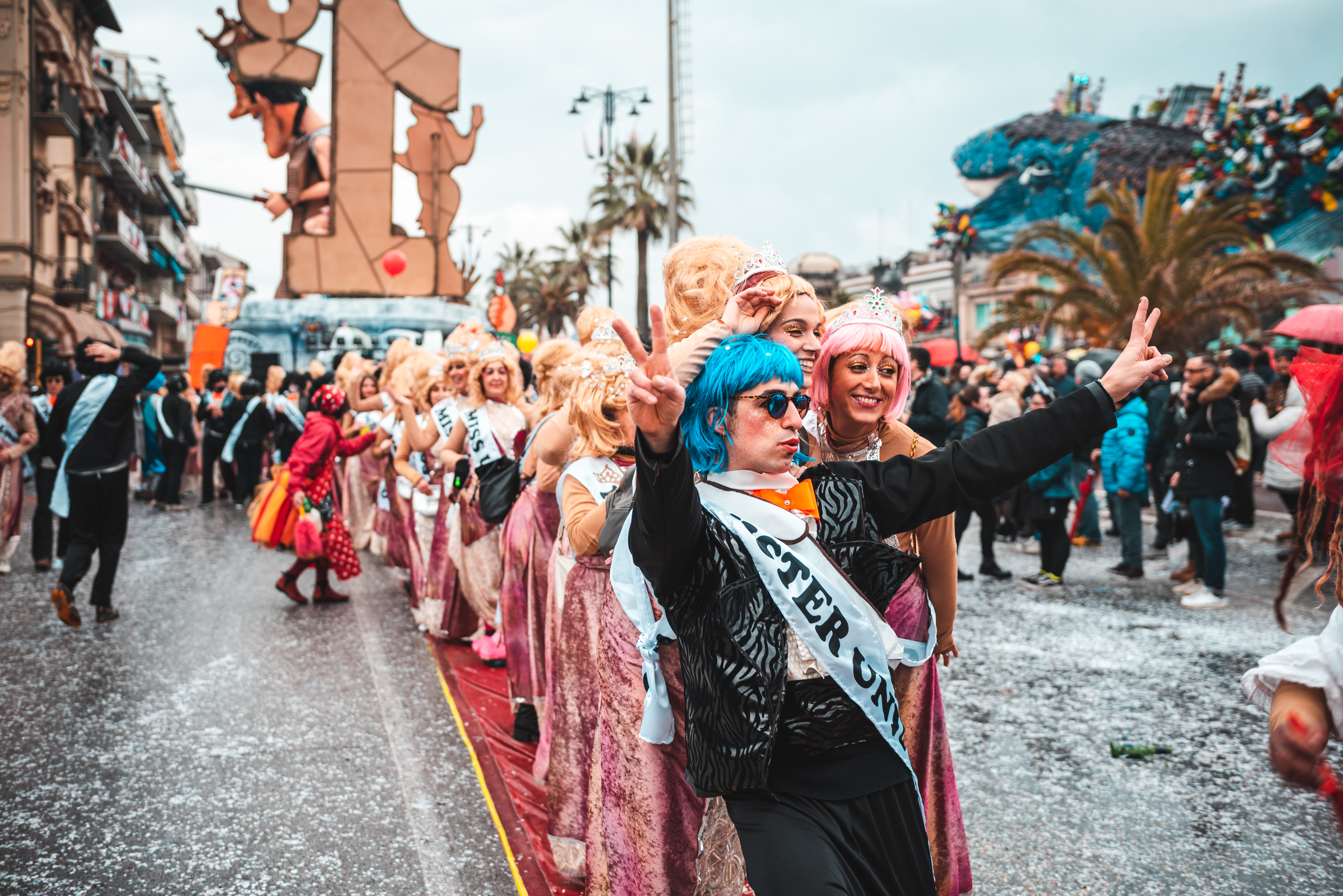
Carnival 2019

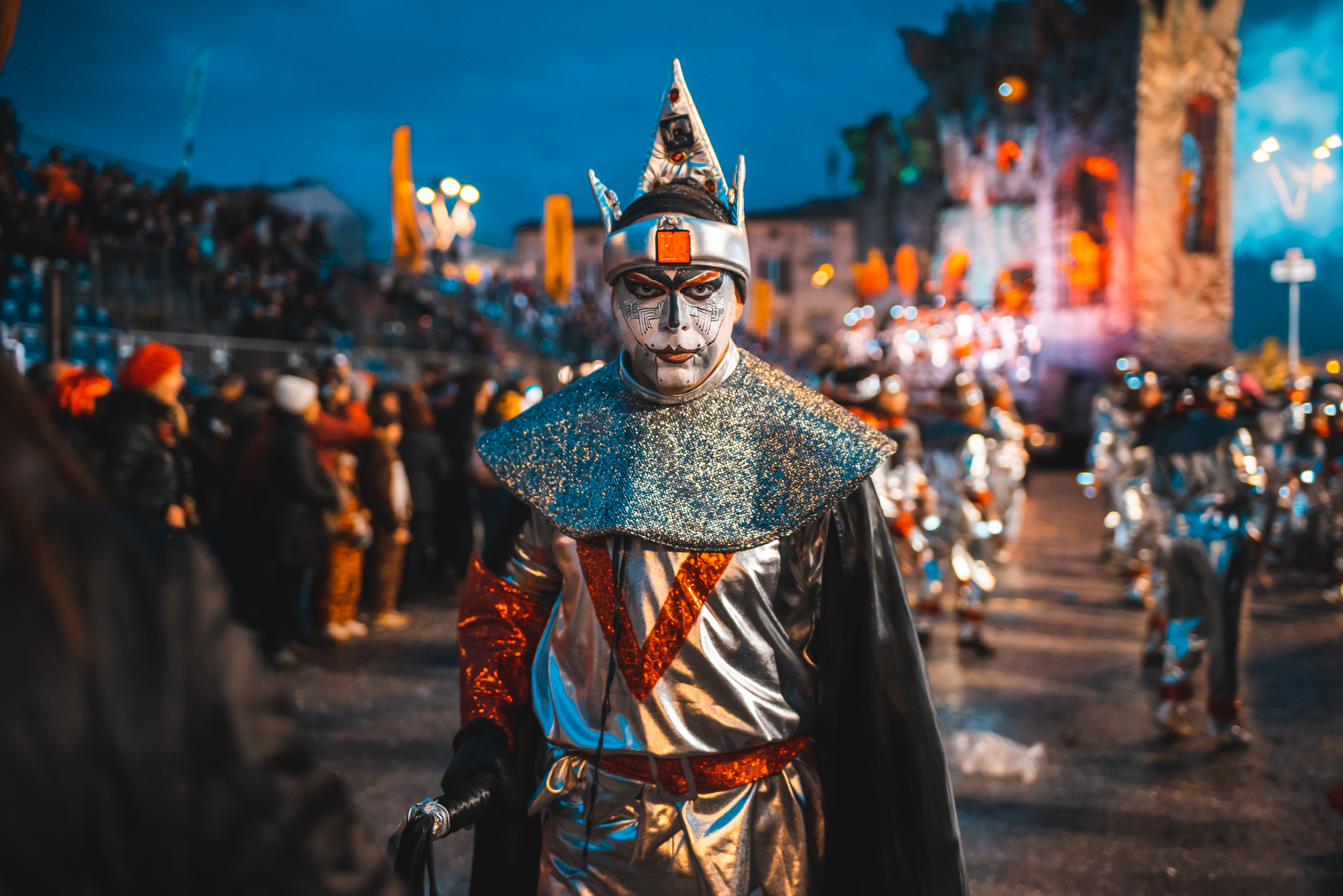
Carnival 2019
