= Carnival of Foiano della Chiana =

Annual carnival in Tuscany, Italy

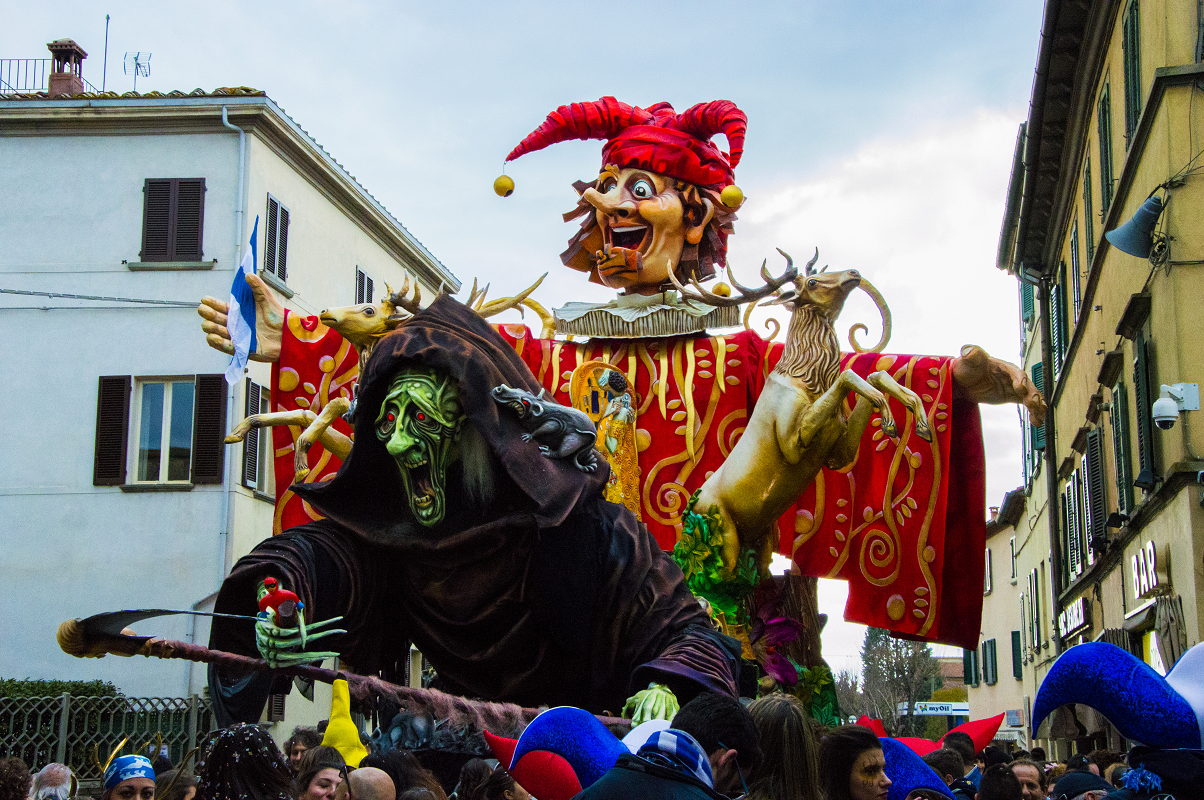
Carro Rustici Foiano 2015 04

The Carnival of Foiano della Chiana (Italian: Carnevale di Foiano della Chiana) is a carnival event yearly held in the Tuscan city of Foiano della Chiana, in Tuscany, in Italy. It is one of the most famous carnivals in Italy, even the oldest, starting in 1539. This carnival takes all year to prepare for, and it’s as important to Foiano as the Palio is to Siena.

The floats are judged by a jury, composed by a sculptor, a painter, a journalist, a scenographer and an art critic. The Cantiere that made the most voted float wins the "Coppa del Carnevale" (Carnival Cup).

An effigy of Giocondo, King of the Carnival is made from straw and rags, and is burned in the main square as a form of collective purification for the people of Foiano. Before the burning, a testament of the year’s events is read aloud like an epilogue for the past year and a prologue to the new starting year.

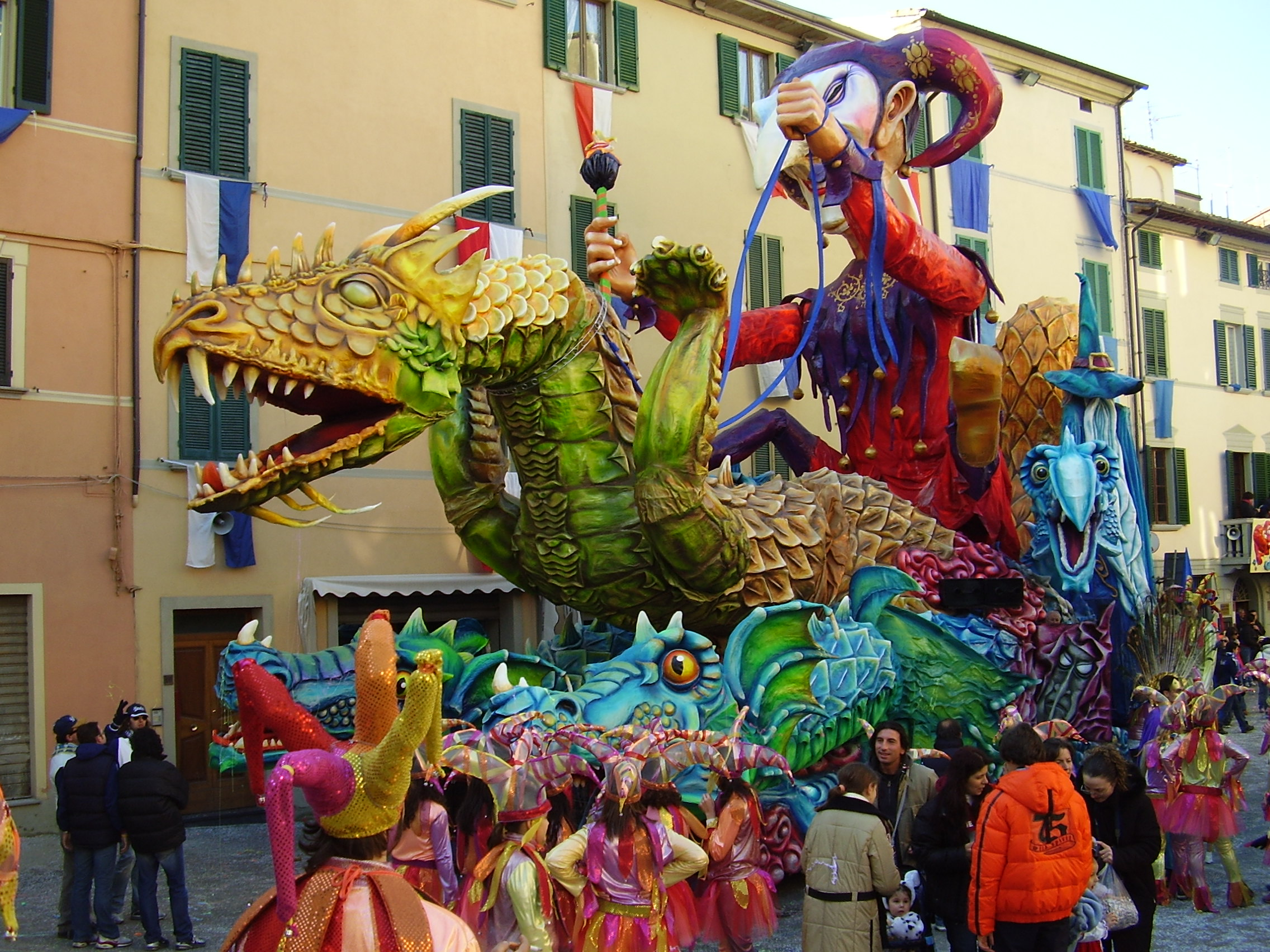
One of the massive, brightly colored floats from the 2006 Carnival.

== Foiano ==
The population of Foiano is subdivided into four cantieri (districts): the oldest are the "Azzurri" (azures) and the "Rustici" (rustics), that were created in 1933, and "Bombolo" (plump), which was born in 1934; the youngest cantiere are the "Nottambuli" (night owls), formed in 1961.

Other three cantieri, the "Pacifici" (peacefuls), "Cuccioli" (puppies) and "Vitelloni" (big calves) disappeared during the 1940s-1950s. The cantieri compete in making a float, inspired to a free subject.

== History ==
The festival is derived from medieval propitiatory rituals meant to appease the townspeople and create a joyous atmosphere to bring in the new year.

Initially, the floats were town carriages and carri matti where lupine, chestnuts and salt cod would be thrown out to the crowd as a treat. The floats are now made of papier-mâché and they have allegorical or political subjects, sometimes featuring political or actuality events, famous people or popular culture.
