= Caltanissetta =

Comune in Sicily, Italy

Caltanissetta Nissa / Cartanissetta (Sicilian)
- Comune
- Comune di Caltanissetta
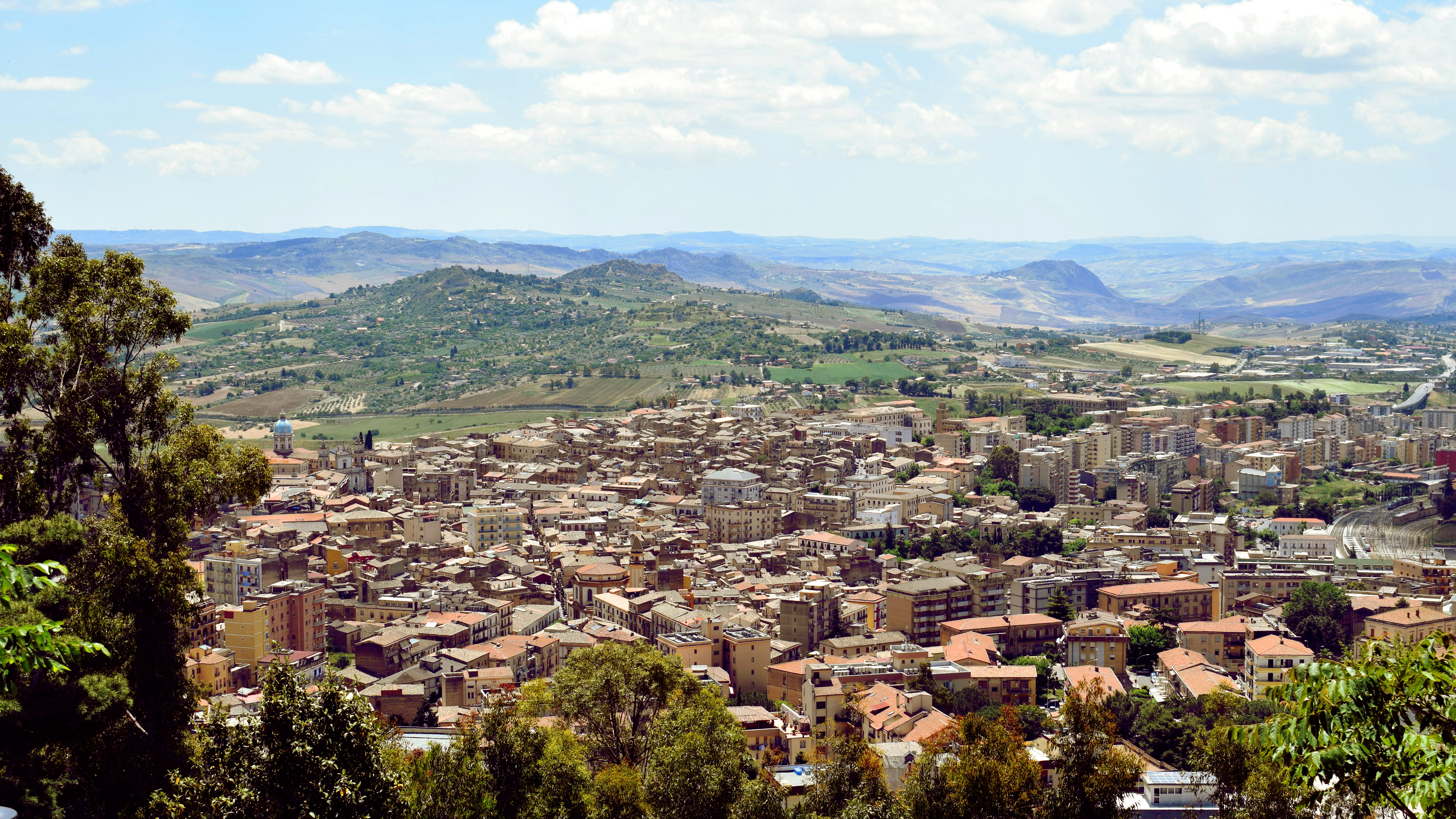

- Coat of arms

- Caltanissetta within its province

- Location within Italy Location within Sicily
- Coordinates: 37°29′25″N 14°03′45″E
- Country: Italy
- Region: Sicily
- Province: Caltanissetta (CL)
- Frazioni: Bifaria, Borgo Petilia, Borgo Canicassè Casale, Cozzo di Naro, Favarella, Prestianni, Villaggio Santa Barbara, Santa Rita, Xirbi

Government
  - Mayor: Walter Tesauro

Area
  - Total: 421.25 km^{2} (162.65 sq mi)
- Elevation: 568 m (1,864 ft)

Population (2025)
  - Total: 58,045
  - Density: 137.79/km^{2} (356.88/sq mi)
- Demonym: Nisseni
- Time zone: UTC+1 (CET)
  - Summer (DST): UTC+2 (CEST)
- Postal code: 93100
- Dialing code: 0934
- Patron saint: St. Michael
- Saint day: September 29
- Website: Official website

Caltanissetta (Sicilian: Cartanissètta) is a city and municipality in the autonomous region of Sicily in Italy, and the capital of the free municipal consortium of Caltanissetta. In 2025, it has a population of 58,045.

The earliest inhabitants of the surrounding territory were the Sicani, who established various settlements as early as the 19th century BC. However, the modern city was likely founded in the 10th century during the Islamic period in Sicily, when the name "Caltanissetta" is believed to have originated, though alternative theories have been proposed over time. Under the Normans, it was transformed into a feudal holding, and after various transitions, it came under the control of the Montcada of Paternò in 1405. This noble family governed the County of Caltanissetta until 1812, leaving behind the Baroque-style Palazzo Moncada, constructed in the 17th century.

From the 19th century onward, Caltanissetta experienced significant industrial growth due to its extensive sulfur deposits, establishing it as a key mining center. Its prominence in the sulfur industry earned it the nickname "world sulfur capital," and in 1862, it became home to Italy's first mining institute, the Sebastiano Mottura Institute. During the 1930s, despite fascist censorship, the city enjoyed a period of cultural vibrancy, leading Leonardo Sciascia to describe it as a "little Athens." After World War II, the mining sector declined, plunging the local economy into crisis. Today, the city's economy relies predominantly on the tertiary sector.

== Etymology ==
The toponym "Caltanissetta" (with an obsolete variant, Caltanisetta) derives from the Arabic Qalʿat an-nisāʾ, literally "fortress of the women" or "castle of the women." This name was recorded by the Arab geographer Muhammad al-Idrisi in 1154 in his Book of Roger. Confirmation of its Arabic origin appears in an 11th-century text by Goffredo Malaterra, who wrote:

Caltanissetta, which, translated into our language, means Castle of the Women
Calatenixet, quod, nostra lingua interpretatum, resolvitur Castrum foeminarum

— Goffredo Malaterra, De rebus gestis Rogerii Calabriae et Siciliae comitis et Roberti Guiscardi ducis fratris eius

The reason behind this designation remains unclear. The notion that the Pietrarossa Castle served as a harem for the Emir of Palermo lacks evidence, given the fortress's military character. According to local historian Rosanna Zaffuto Rovello, the name may reflect a situation in which the men, who worked in the distant fields, lived away from the village, leaving it predominantly inhabited by women.

Scholar Luigi Santagati suggests the toponym indicates an unconfirmed pre-existing Byzantine settlement. He posits that nisāʾ ("woman" in Arabic) might be a corruption of Nissa, an Anatolian city from which Byzantine stratioti originated. These soldiers may have built the Pietrarossa Castle and a nearby village named Nissa, now the Angeli district. Following Arab conquest, the prefix Qalʿat ("castle") was added, akin to the renaming of Henna (modern Enna) as Qasr Yannae, later Castrogiovanni, and other localities where Byzantine names were adapted or integrated.

With the Norman arrival in the 11th century, the city adopted Latinized forms like Calatenixet (per Malaterra) or Calatanesat, a transliteration from al-Idrisi's Arabic. By the late 12th century, historian Hugo Falcandus in his Liber De Regno Sicilie refers to it as Caltanixettum, the official Latin precursor to its modern name.

== History ==
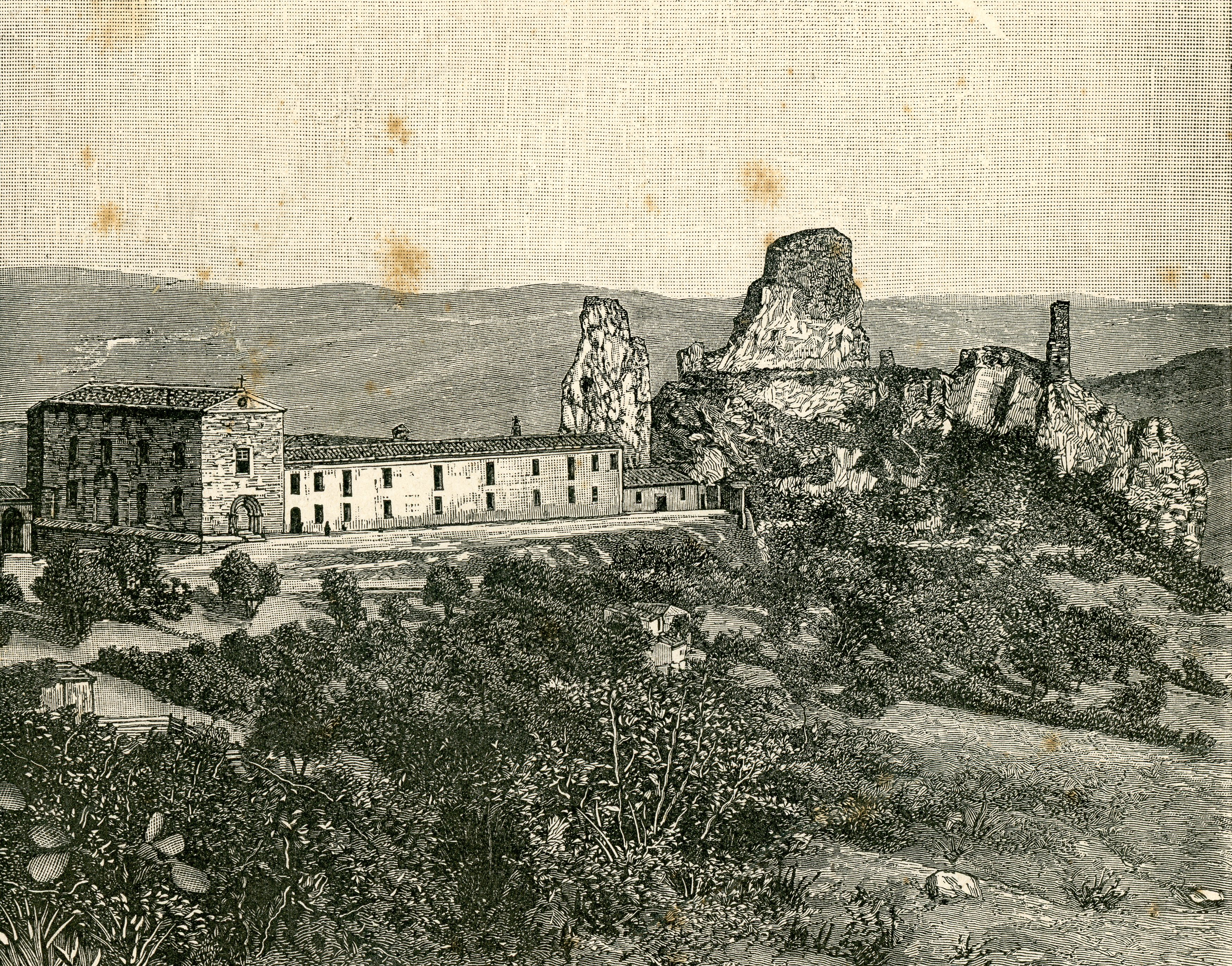
Remains of the ancient Pietrarossa Castle, with the adjacent convent and Santa Maria degli Angeli Church (woodcut by Giuseppe Barberis, 1892)

Caltanissetta's history traces back to the 4th millennium BC, evidenced by Bronze Age artifacts and rock-cut chamber tombs found at Sabucina and Gibil Gabib, settlements linked to the Sicani. These were overtaken by the Greek colony of Gela around the 6th century BC and later fell under Akragas (modern Agrigento). Roman traces include artifacts (e.g., a bust of Emperor Geta) from shaft tombs in the Lannari district near Sabucina and the Santo Spirito Abbey, originally a Roman military outpost, later a granary, and then an abbey in the Norman era.

However, the first documentary evidence regarding the city dates back to 1087, when the current town center was founded by Count Roger the Norman following the Norman conquest of Sicily. The Normans built the Abbey of Santo Spirito and the Castle of Pietrarossa, which was granted as a fief to various members of Grand Count Roger's family. Under Hohenstaufen rule, Emperor Frederick II elevated the Santa Maria degli Angeli Church to parish status, replacing the Santo Spirito Abbey. The Aragonese made it a county for the Lancia family, who passed it to the Aragon, Dukes of Randazzo in the early 14th century. In 1407, it came under the Montcada of Paternò, a dominion lasting until the abolition of feudalism in Sicily in 1812. During Montcada rule, significant public works emerged, including the vital Capodarso bridge linking to Castrogiovanni (modern Enna), alongside Baroque structures like the unfinished Palazzo Moncada, the Santa Maria la Nova Cathedral with frescoes by Flemish artist Borremans, and the Sant'Agata al Collegio Church, seat of the Jesuit Order.

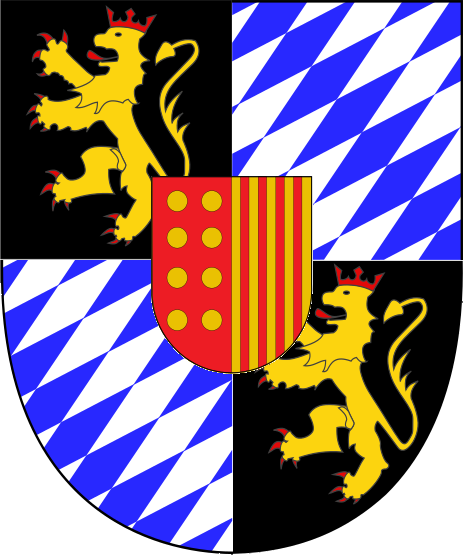
Coat of arms of the Montcada

In 1816, under the Bourbons, Caltanissetta became a provincial capital, opting against the anti-Bourbon revolts of 1820, which led to reprisals and looting by insurgents. It actively joined the revolts of 1848 and 1860, warmly welcoming Garibaldi and the Thousand, and was annexed to the Kingdom of Italy. This era saw a sulfur mining boom, earning it the "world sulfur capital" title, bringing prosperity but also claiming many lives among miners ("zolfatai") working in harsh, inhumane conditions.

In 1943, Caltanissetta endured heavy Anglo-American bombings, resulting in numerous casualties. The post-war period marked the irreversible decline of the sulfur industry, with all local mines closing by the late 1980s. Yet, this time also saw a cultural resurgence, driven by intellectuals like Salvatore Sciascia, Leonardo Sciascia, Vitaliano Brancati, Rosario Assunto, and Luigi Russo, earning it the "Little Athens" moniker. Still, the city struggled with unemployment (stabilizing in the 1970s, worsening again by the end of the decade), alongside clientelism and property speculation, reshaping the city with new residential zones and leading to the gradual abandonment of the historic center. In 1999, it gained national attention due to the assassination of Mayor Michele Abbate by a deranged individual.

Since the early 2000s, alongside rising emigration of locals to other Italian cities or abroad, Caltanissetta has seen a significant influx of immigrants, particularly from Sub-Saharan Africa, partly due to the CARA of Pian del Lago, one of Italy's largest centers hosting hundreds of asylum seekers from these regions.

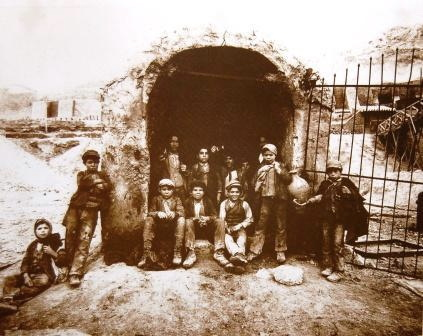
Carusi at the entrance of a sulfur mine shaft; 1899.

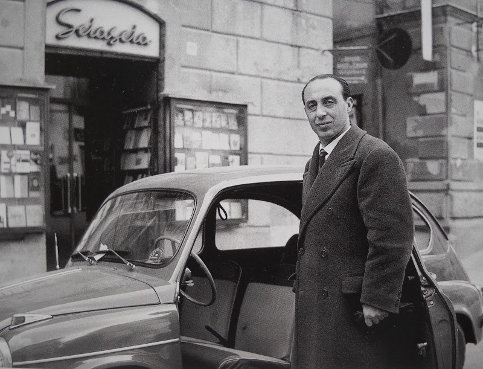
Salvatore Sciascia outside his renowned bookstore on Corso Umberto I in the 1960s.

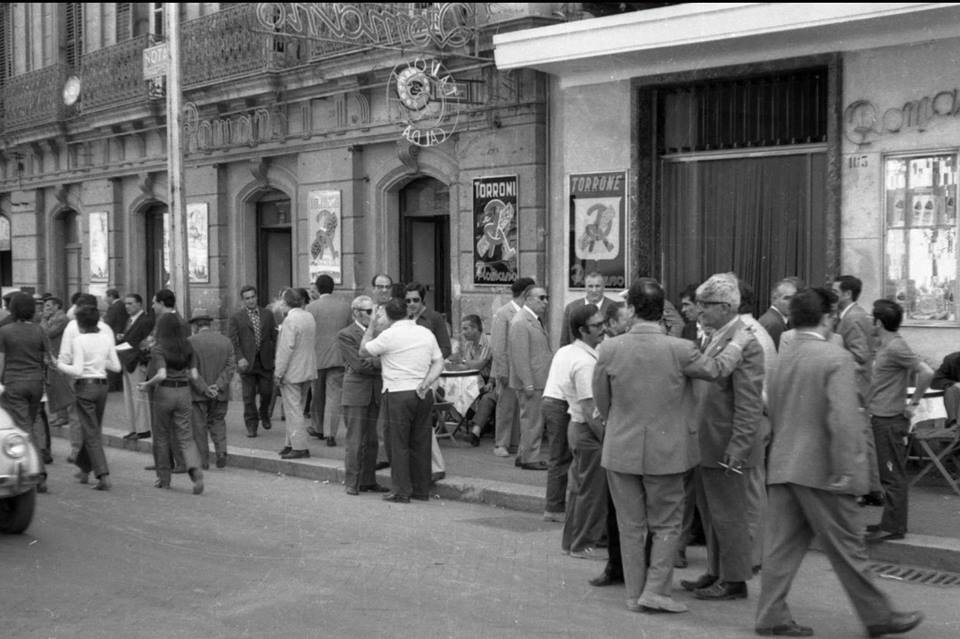
The Romano Bar on Corso Umberto I, a city landmark, in the 1960s.

== Geography ==
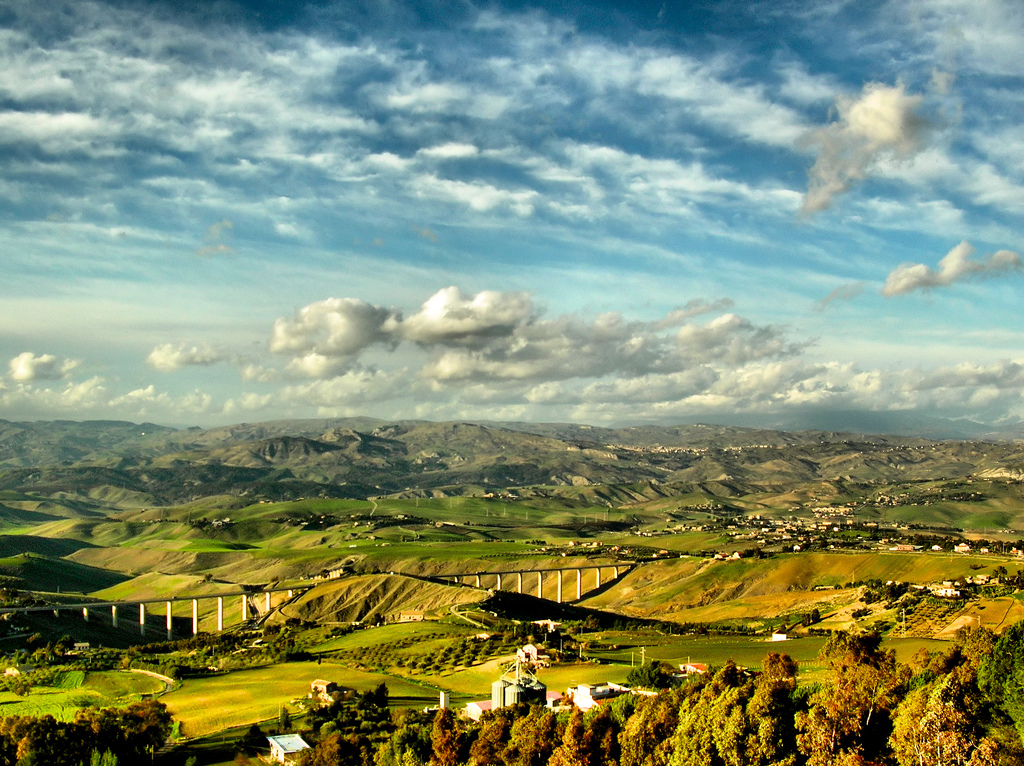
View of the countryside north of Caltanissetta from the summit of Mount San Giuliano

The expansive territory of Caltanissetta ranks as Italy's 14th largest comune by area and the fourth largest in Sicily, following Noto, Monreale, and Ragusa. Located in Sicily's interior, it has no coastline. The terrain, part of the Erean Mountains, is predominantly hilly, with its highest peak reaching 859 meters (2,818 feet) above sea level. The city center, at an elevation of 568 meters (1,864 feet), makes Caltanissetta the seventh-highest provincial capital in Italy, surpassed in Sicily only by Enna.

=== Territory ===
Caltanissetta occupies a commanding position overlooking the entire valley of the Salso River, which extends to include nearby Enna. The city's morphology mirrors the rugged, limestone-clay composition of the surrounding landscape.

The urban center is nestled between three hills—Sant'Anna, Mount San Giuliano, and Poggio Sant'Elia—arranged in an arc that forms a basin encompassing parts of the historic district and all southern neighborhoods.

Under the current Regional Landscape Plan of the free municipal consortium of Caltanissetta, overseen by Sicily's Department of Cultural and Environmental Heritage, much of Caltanissetta's territory falls within local landscape designations No. 9 "Mining Areas," No. 8 "Urban Systems of Caltanissetta and San Cataldo," and No. 5 "Salito Valley."

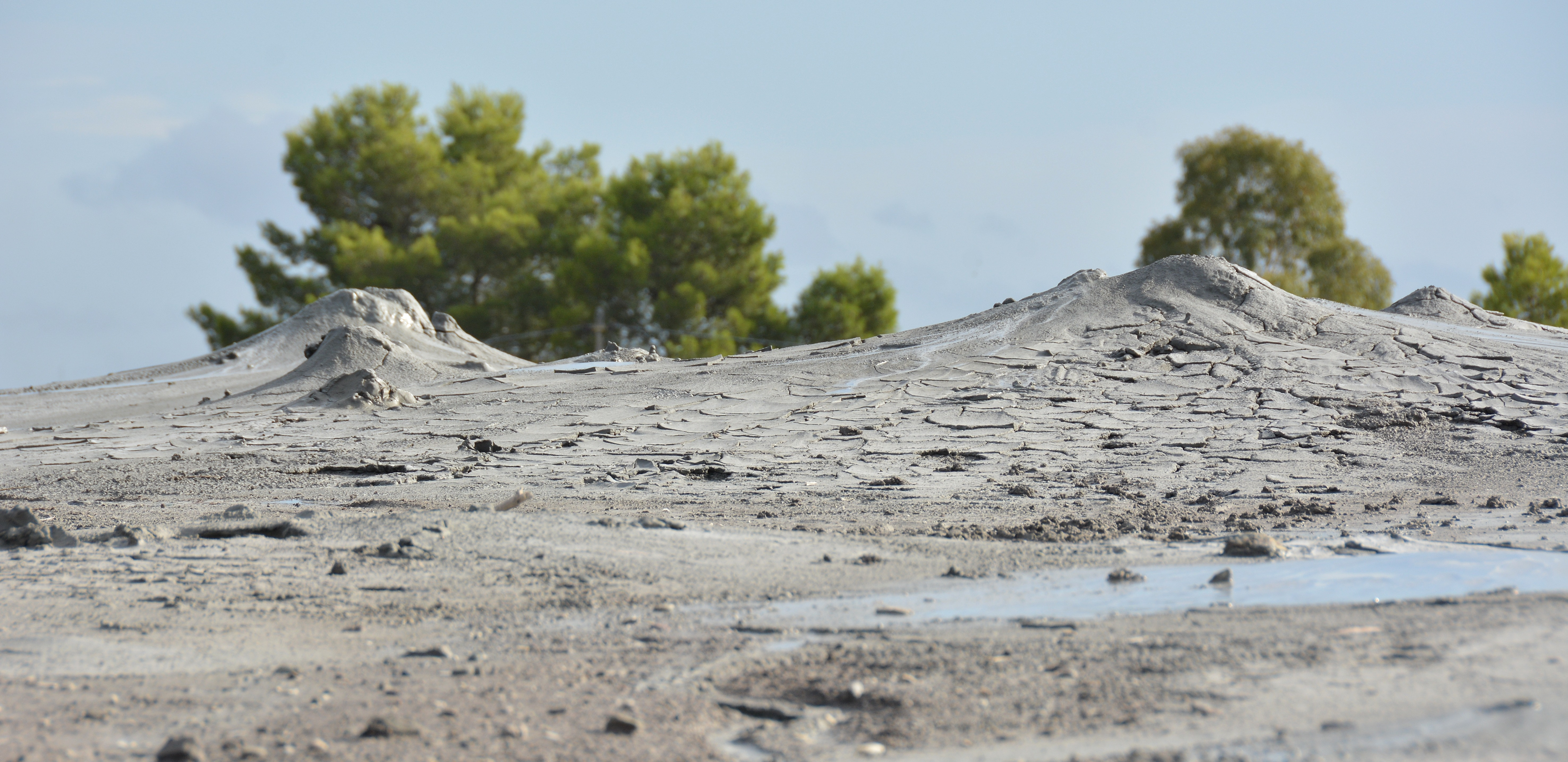
Maccaluba, a mud volcano in the Terrapelata locality

In geological literature, the comune's territory is classified within the "Caltanissetta Basin." Per Legislative Decree 30/2009, this basin is recognized as an underground water body in Sicily, one of the island's 19 hydrogeological basins, and is subject to aquifer quality monitoring by the Sicilian Region. Initial surveys of outcropping geological formations were conducted by Luigi Baldacci and Sebastiano Mottura; further studies in the 1930s were undertaken by German geologist Behermann. Leo Ogniben conducted significant research on Sicily's sulfur-bearing series, while stratigraphic sequences were reconstructed by Paolo Schmidt di Friedberg. Decima and Wezel published studies on Messinian evaporites, introducing the lower and upper evaporitic complexes in Sicily.

A distinctive geological phenomenon is the Maccalube of Terrapelata, small volcanoes that intermittently erupt clay mud and gas, located near the Santa Barbara village.

=== Climate ===
According to the Köppen climate classification, Caltanissetta experiences a hot-summer Mediterranean climate (Csa), locally characterized by cool, wet winters and hot, dry breezy summers, with on average 60 rainy days annually.

Temperatures vary widely: winter highs average 9 to 12 °C (48.2 to 53.6 °F), while summer highs reach 30 to 35 °C (86 to 95 °F); lows range from 4 to 6 °C (39.2 to 42.8 °F) in winter to 15 to 20 °C (59 to 68 °F) in summer. Recorded extremes include a low of −7 °C or 19.4 °F in 1934 and a high of 44 °C or 111.2 °F in the summer of 1983.

Wind is a notable climatic feature of the city. Brief, sporadic snowfalls as well as night frost may occur in winter. Rainfall is concentrated from September to April, with an average annual total of 536 millimetres or 21.1 inches.

Climate data for Caltanissetta (1991–2020)
Month	Jan	Feb	Mar	Apr	May	Jun	Jul	Aug	Sep	Oct	Nov	Dec	Year
Mean daily maximum °C (°F)	12.4 (54.3)	12.9 (55.2)	15.7 (60.3)	19.0 (66.2)	24.7 (76.5)	30.3 (86.5)	33.5 (92.3)	33.5 (92.3)	27.8 (82.0)	23.2 (73.8)	17.3 (63.1)	13.3 (55.9)	22.0 (71.5)
Daily mean °C (°F)	8.8 (47.8)	8.8 (47.8)	11.1 (52.0)	14.0 (57.2)	19.0 (66.2)	24.1 (75.4)	27.0 (80.6)	27.3 (81.1)	22.5 (72.5)	18.6 (65.5)	13.6 (56.5)	9.9 (49.8)	17.1 (62.7)
Mean daily minimum °C (°F)	5.2 (41.4)	4.8 (40.6)	6.5 (43.7)	9.1 (48.4)	13.3 (55.9)	17.8 (64.0)	20.5 (68.9)	21.0 (69.8)	17.1 (62.8)	14.0 (57.2)	9.9 (49.8)	6.6 (43.9)	12.2 (53.9)
Average precipitation mm (inches)	70 (2.8)	40 (1.6)	40 (1.6)	45 (1.8)	30 (1.2)	14 (0.6)	7 (0.3)	15 (0.6)	45 (1.8)	90 (3.5)	65 (2.6)	75 (3.0)	536 (21.4)
Average precipitation days (≥ 1.0 mm)	9	7	6	4	3	1	1	1	4	7	8	9	60
Source: Climi e viaggi

=== Symbols ===
The municipal statute provides the blazon descriptions of the coat of arms and gonfalon, officially recognized by a decree of the head of government on January 13, 1941.

Coat of Arms

The coat of arms of Caltanissetta consists of a fortress with three crenelated towers, rendered in gold on a red field, surmounted by an ancient heraldic crown. From the right lateral tower, on the right, emerges the head of a warrior wearing a helmet with the visor raised, while from the left tower, on the left, protrudes a hand grasping a sword.

Gonfalon

A banner featuring a vermilion cross, bordered below by green and yellow, and above by white on the left and turquoise on the right. At the center of the vermilion cross, a golden eagle bears the city's coat of arms on its chest. Above the eagle's head rests an heraldic crown. With its talons, the eagle clutches two cornucopias overflowing with wheat stalks and fruit.

== Demographics ==
Historical population
Year	Pop.	±%
1861	23,719	—
1871	25,473	+7.4%
1881	30,174	+18.5%
1901	42,590	+41.1%
1911	40,515	−4.9%
1921	59,760	+47.5%
1931	42,794	−28.4%
1936	49,959	+16.7%
1951	60,022	+20.1%
1961	62,392	+3.9%
1971	59,549	−4.6%
1981	60,635	+1.8%
1991	61,319	+1.1%
2001	61,438	+0.2%
2011	61,711	+0.4%
2021	59,245	−4.0%
Source: ISTAT

As of 2025, Caltanissetta has a population of 58,045, of whom 48.6% are male and 51.4% are female. Minors make up 15.1% of the population, and seniors make up 24.7%, compared to the Italian average of 14.9% and 24.7% respectively.

=== Foreigners ===
As of 2024, the foreign-born population is 3,925, equal to 6.7% of the population. The 5 largest foreign nationalities are Moroccans (707), Pakistanis (594), Romanians (488), Belgians (187) and Germans (184).

== Culture ==
A culturally significant yet brief period unfolded between 1935 and 1970, when notable figures such as Leonardo Sciascia and Vitaliano Brancati resided in Caltanissetta, and the publisher Salvatore Sciascia was particularly active. The city once hosted the Regalpetra Literary Park, dedicated to Leonardo Sciascia, though it has since been abandoned. Additionally, SiciliAntica has organized an annual conference on Sicilian history since 2004.

Since 2022, Caltanissetta has spearheaded the project for the First Worldwide Mediterranean Lifestyle Park, in collaboration with 103 other central Sicilian cities.

=== Traditions and folklore ===
==== Holy Week ====
This term encompasses the array of rituals and events held in the city during the week leading up to Easter. The festivities commence on the afternoon of Palm Sunday, when a statue of Jesus is paraded through the streets atop a boat adorned entirely with flowers, commemorating Jesus's entry into Jerusalem. The celebrations continue on Monday and Tuesday with the "Scinnenza," a series of enactments depicting the Last Supper and the Passion of Jesus. The Holy Week observances intensify on Wednesday morning with the procession of the Real Maestranza, a guild comprising all categories of the city's artisans, whose captain is symbolically handed the keys to the city by the mayor. That evening, nineteen small sacred groups known as varicedde, representing various moments of the Passion of Jesus and modeled after the larger vare, proceed through the streets. These are followed by sixteen life-sized papier-mâché statuary groups, the vare, which traverse the main streets of the historic center from Thursday afternoon into the late hours of Holy Thursday night. On Good Friday, the procession features the Black Christ, a wooden crucifix revered as a co-patron of the city, accompanied by the lamentations of the "fogliamari," descendants of ancient wild herb gatherers. Following a day of silence on Holy Saturday, Easter Sunday sees the city's main authorities, including the captain of the Real Maestranza, attending a solemn Mass celebrated by the bishop in the cathedral.

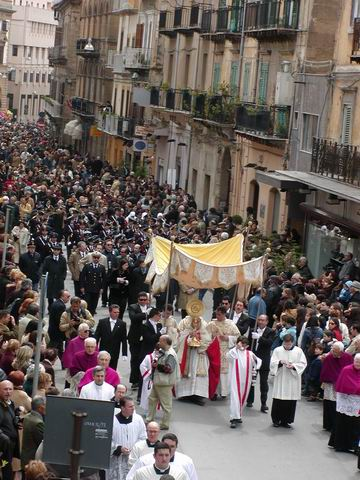
A moment from the Real Maestranza procession on Holy Wednesday.

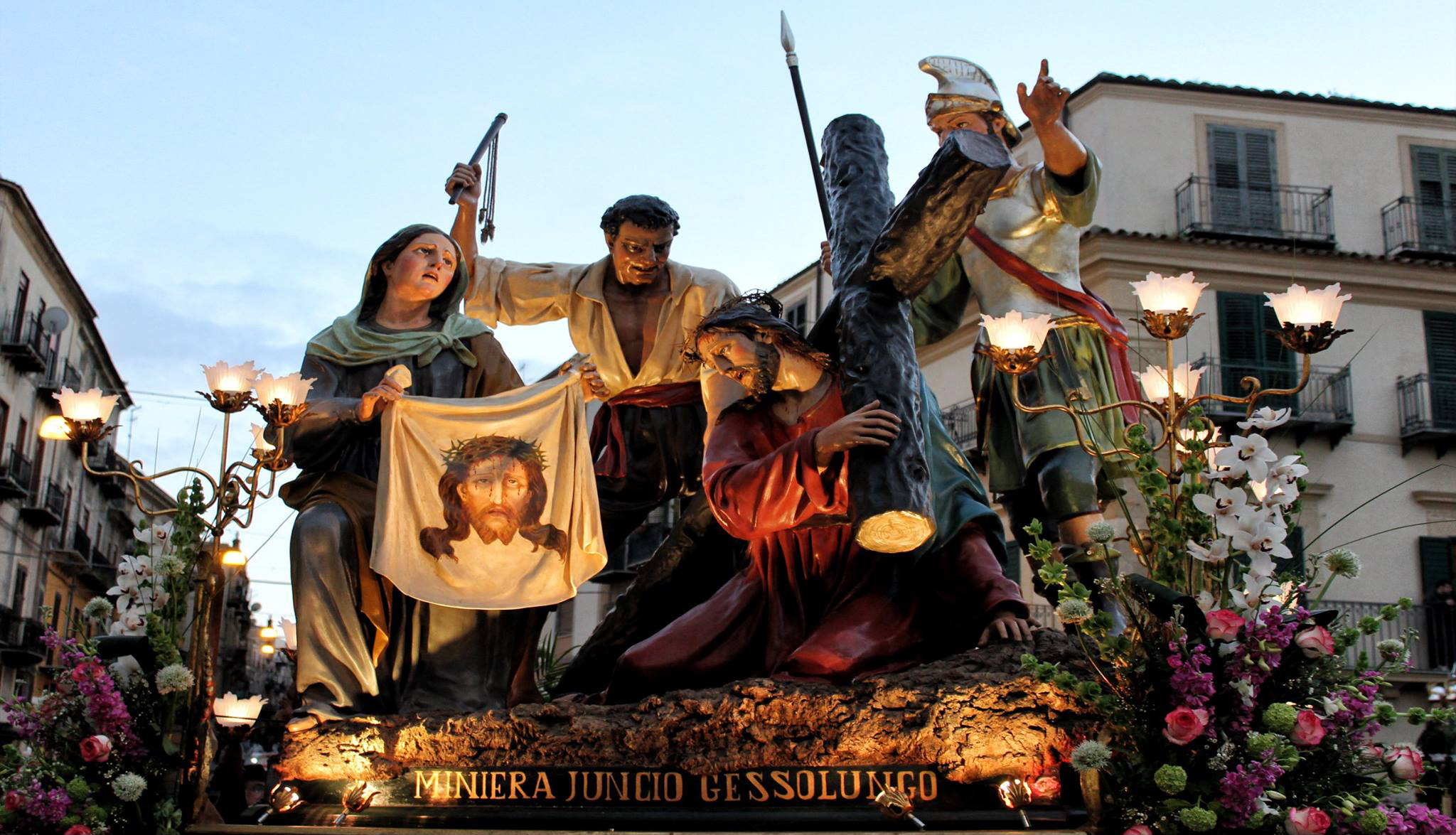
"La Veronica," one of the vare carried in procession on Holy Thursday.

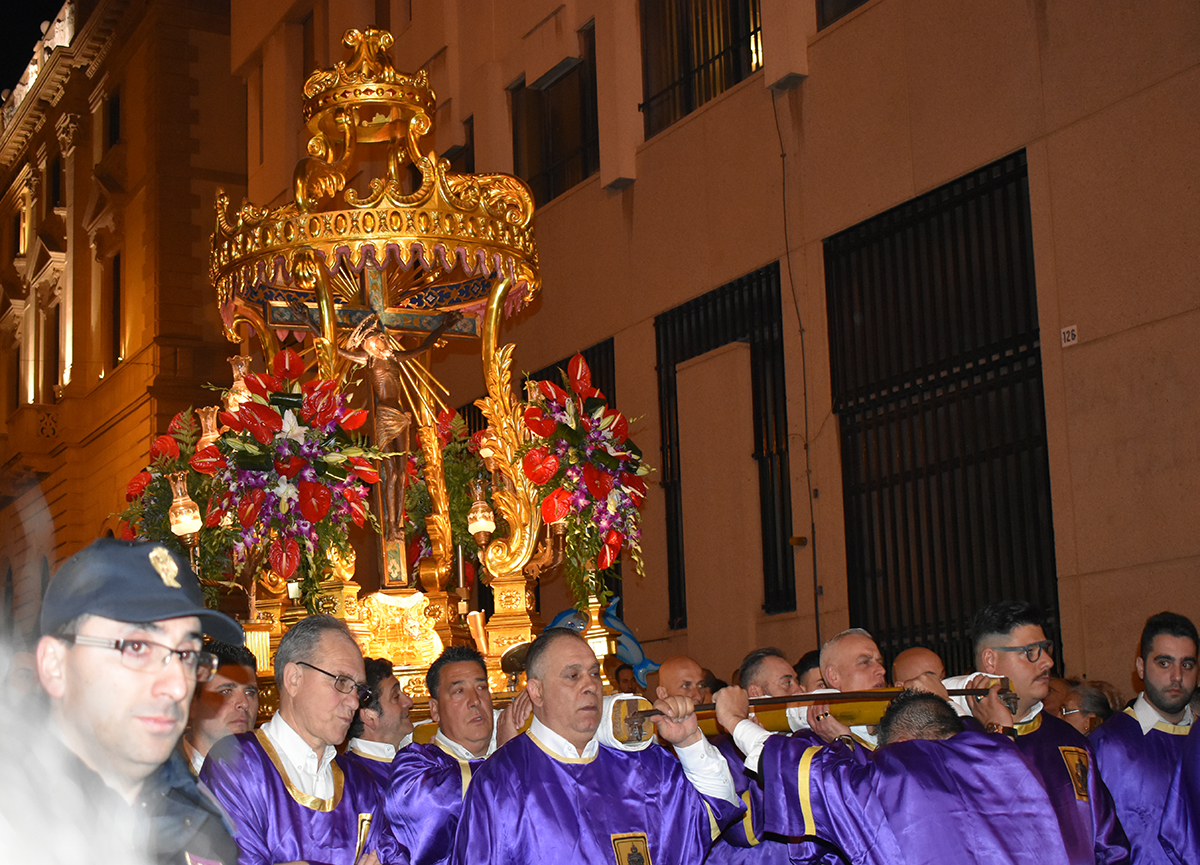
The "Black Christ" carried in procession by the fogliamari on Good Friday.

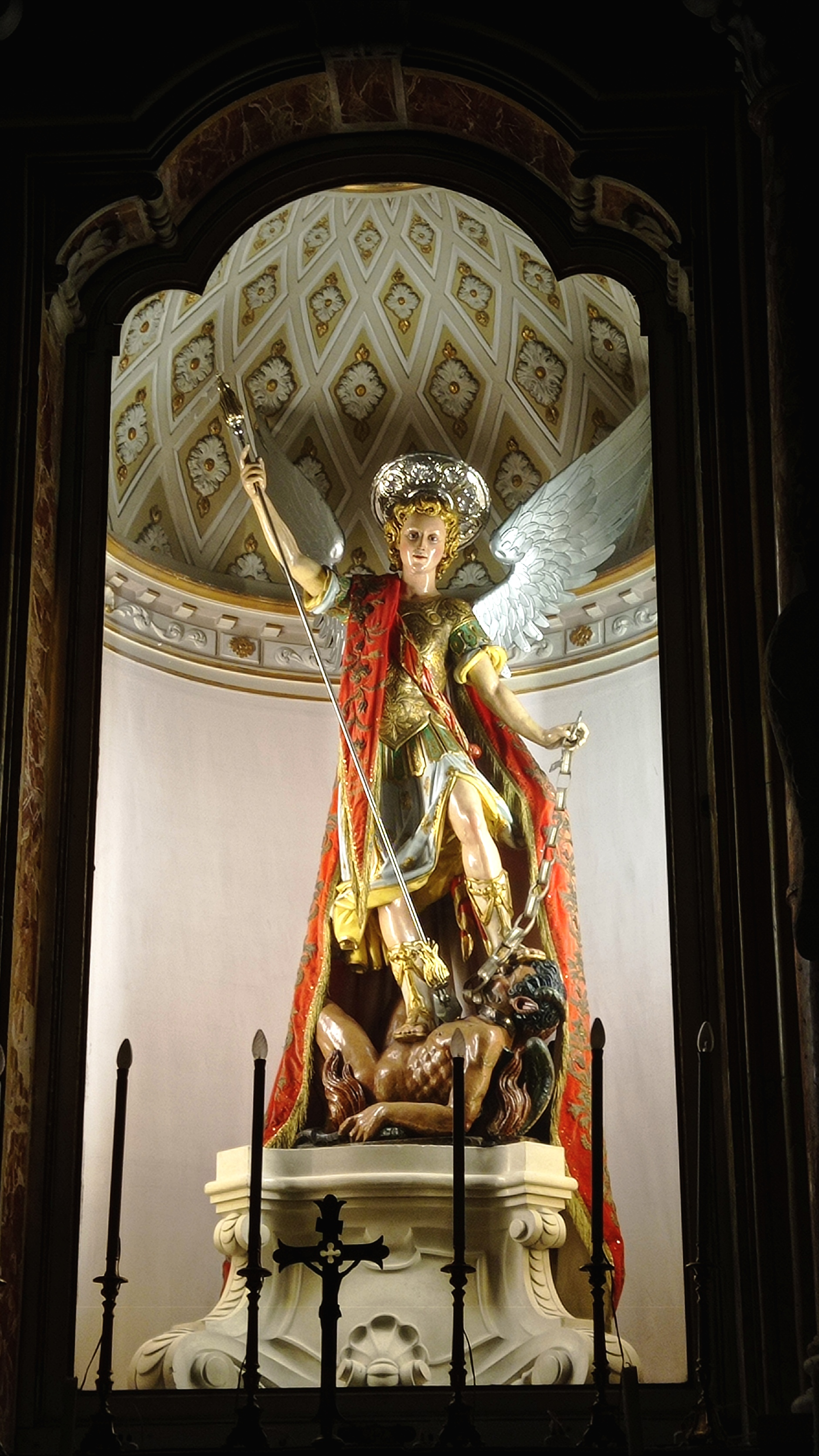
Statue of Saint Michael the Archangel, crafted by Stefano Li Volsi

==== Feast of Saint Michael ====
This patronal festival, celebrated on September 29, honors Saint Michael the Archangel, credited with miraculously saving the city from the plague in 1625. A week prior to this date, the statue of the Archangel, sculpted by Stefano Li Volsi in the 17th century, is moved from the right nave altar of the Cathedral to the main altar. On the morning of September 29, the mayor offers a votive candle to the patron saint, and in the evening, the statue is carried in procession through the historic center's streets on the shoulders of barefoot devotees, who accompany it with the traditional cry, "E gridammu tutti! Viva lu principi San Micheli Arcangiulu" ("And let us all shout! Long live the prince Saint Michael the Archangel"). The faithful, many of whom go barefoot as a votive gesture, follow. The procession concludes with the saint's return to the Cathedral, greeted by a display of fireworks. Throughout the week of festivities, the traditional Saint Michael's Fair is held.

==== Vacation of Saint Michael ====
This event, also dedicated to the patron saint, is observed on May 8, marking the anniversary of Saint Michael's apparition to Francesco Giarratana, a Capuchin friar credited with sparking the city's devotion to the saint. The statue is escorted in procession by the Real Maestranza, adorned with white gloves and bow ties, from the Cathedral to the Sanctuary of Saint Michael, where it remains until the following Sunday, when it returns to the mother church. The event's name reflects the temporary relocation of the statue.

==== Feast of the Redeemer ====
Celebrated on August 6, this event is tied to the construction of the Monument to the Redeemer on Mount San Giuliano, commissioned by Pope Leo XIII alongside nineteen other monuments across Italy for the Jubilee of 1900. The monument initiated the cult of Christ the Redeemer in Caltanissetta, with its culmination in the feast of August 6, coinciding with the liturgical feast of the Transfiguration. The celebration involves a statue replicating the features of the monument overlooking the city being carried through the historic center's streets, while the summit of Mount San Giuliano is adorned with floral arrangements placed before the statue's pedestal.

==== Procession of the Three Saints ====
Held on December 28, this procession is linked to the 1908 Messina earthquake, which devastated eastern Sicily and southern Calabria but spared Caltanissetta. It originated on the day of the earthquake as a thanksgiving for escaping danger and a plea for protection from future tremors, becoming a consolidated tradition in subsequent years. The procession features statues of Saint Michael, the Redeemer, and the Immaculate Conception, the latter a wooden figure entirely covered in silver leaf to evoke the vision from the Book of Revelation passage known as "Woman of the Apocalypse" ("a woman clothed with the sun, with the moon under her feet, and on her head a crown of twelve stars"). On the evening of December 28, the Three Saints depart from the Cathedral, traverse the city center's streets followed by a crowd of devotees, and return to the Cathedral.

=== Institutions, organizations, and associations ===
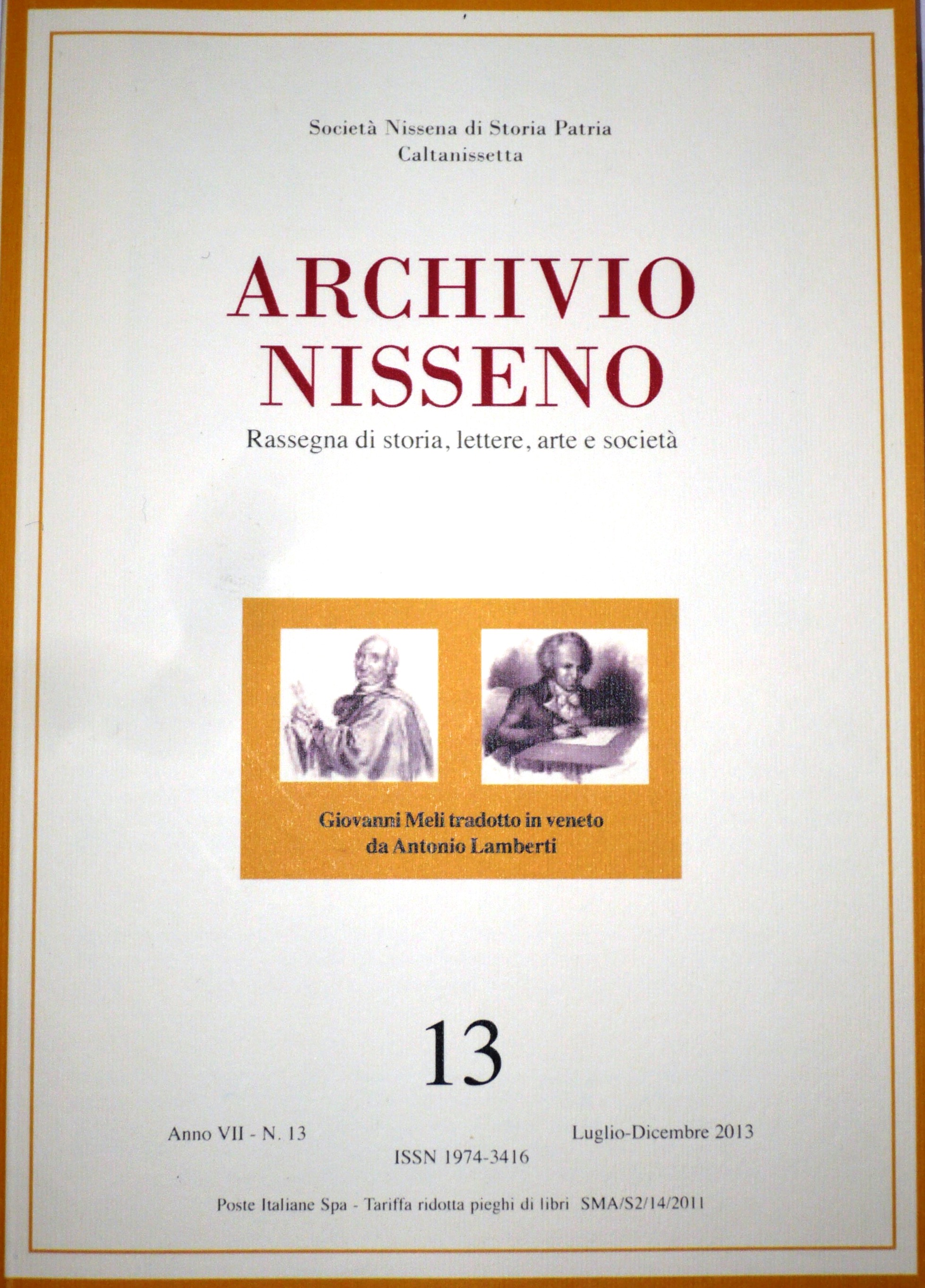
The magazine Archivio Nisseno

Local history
Since 2012, Caltanissetta has been home to the Società Nissena di Storia Patria, a state-recognized thematic deputation. The society's primary mission is to enhance and promote the history of the area, revitalizing the cultural heritage of the Caltanissetta territory, notably through the publication of the biannual journal Archivio Nisseno. It has been a non-profit organization since 2014 and, since 2016, has been housed in the convent of the Minor Friars adjacent to the Church of Santa Maria degli Angeli, where a library has been established thanks to donations.

=== Archives and libraries ===
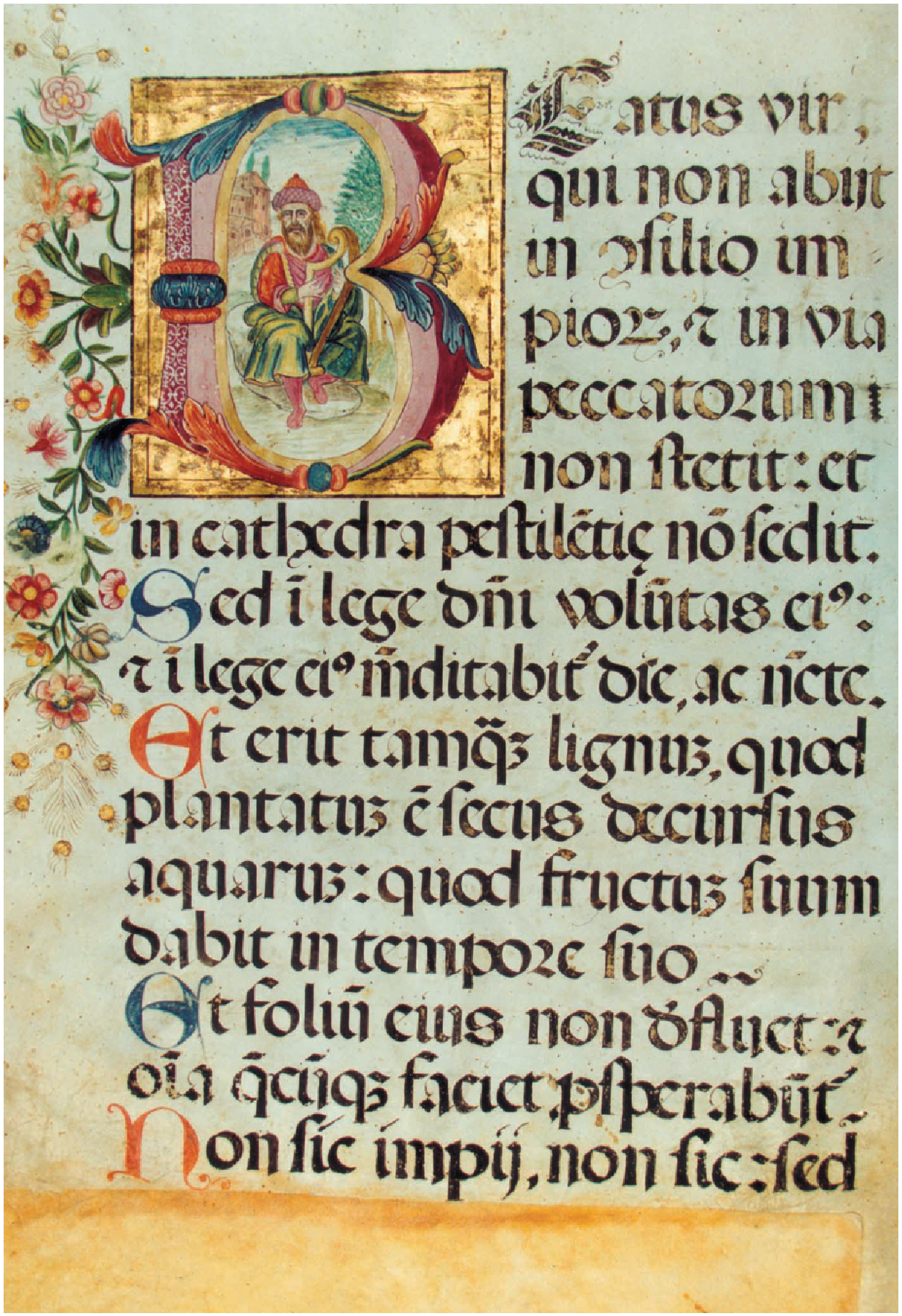
A daily psalter, an illuminated miniature from the 17th century, originating from the Capuchin Convent in the Pigni district, stolen in 2010 from the Scarabelli library.

State Archives
Established in 1843 as an archive under the Bourbon Province of Caltanissetta, it retained this status even after Italian unification until 1932, when the old Bourbon archives came under direct state jurisdiction. Since 1975, its responsibilities have been transferred to the Ministry of Cultural Heritage and Activities. It houses, among other collections, notarial archives up to 1903, records of religious corporations suppressed after 1866, the Mining Corps archive, and the historical archive of the Caltanissetta municipality up to 1860. The building, designed by architect Salvatore Cardella, was built in 1969 and features a ten-story tower for storage and a two-story structure for offices.

Scarabelli library
Located in the premises of the 17th-century former Jesuit College, adjacent to the Church of Sant'Agata, this library was founded in 1862. It boasts a collection of over 140,000 volumes and nearly three hundred manuscripts, amassed through private donations and confiscations from religious orders of the past. Strongly promoted by the Prefect Domenico Marco, it is named after Luciano Scarabelli, a professor from Piacenza, who enriched its collections with numerous donations. Another key figure was librarian Calogero Manasia. The library also has an external branch in the Santa Barbara village.

Diocesan Library

Housed on the ground floor of the episcopal palace, adjacent to the auditorium of the Diocesan Museum, it was established in 1904 by Bishop Ignazio Zuccaro to preserve books bequeathed by his predecessor, Giovanni Guttadauro, forming the ancient collection. Monsignor Giovanni Speciale reorganized the library and cataloged its volumes; upon his death, he left approximately 7,000 volumes, constituting a collection named after him. Today, its holdings total around 47,000 volumes, encompassing theology, spirituality, Italian and foreign literature, Greek and Latin language and literature, art, philosophy, history, Church history, patrology, oratory, legal sciences, sciences, mathematics, music, and various publications. It also features a newspaper library.

Other smaller libraries include the library of the Court of Appeal of Caltanissetta, the general culture and environmental studies library of the Caltanissetta section of Italia Nostra, and the sound library of the Vincenzo Bellini Higher Institute of Musical Studies.

=== Universities ===
Caltanissetta hosts decentralized branches of the University of Palermo, the International University of Rome, and an educational hub of the Niccolò Cusano University.

=== Museums ===
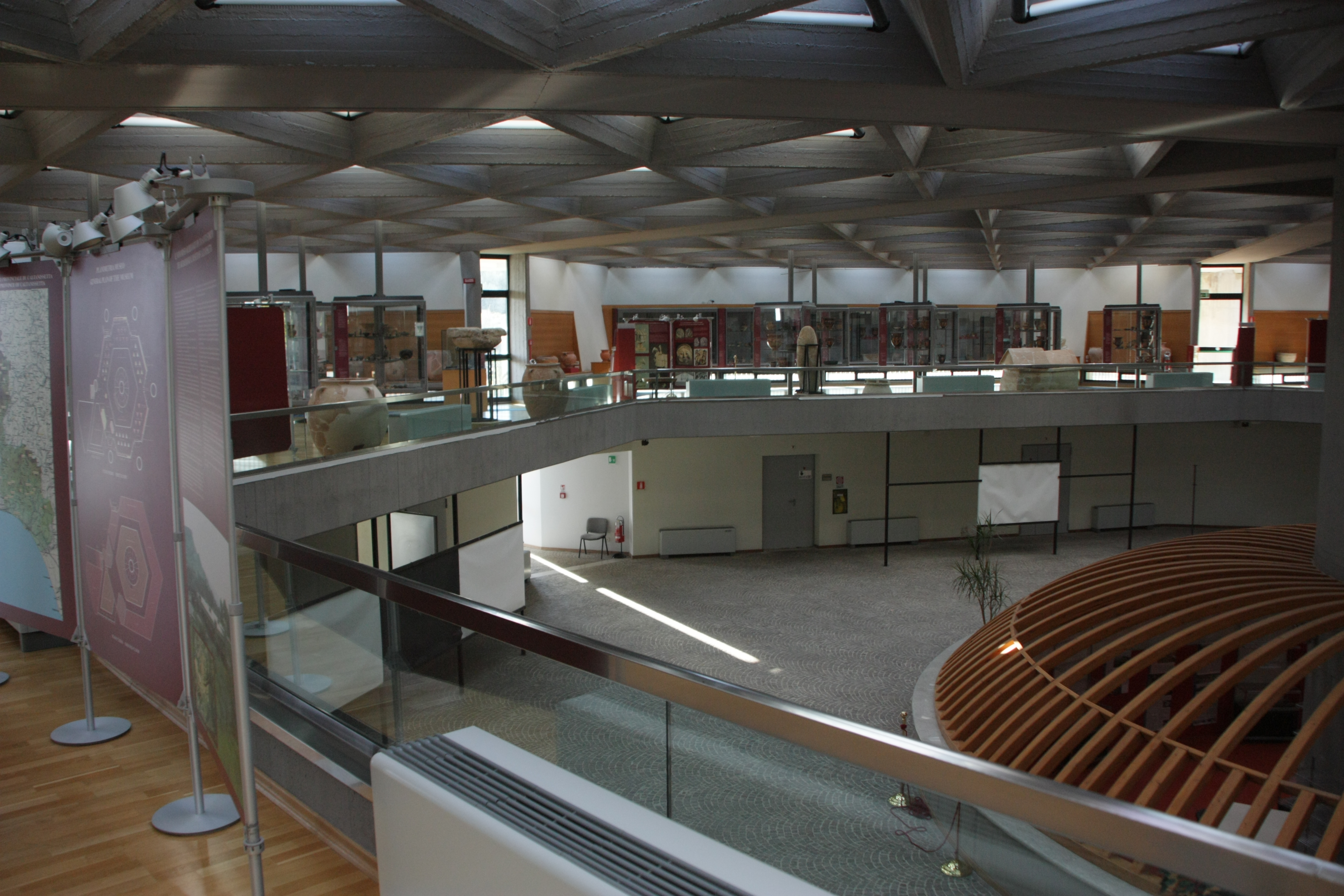
Interior of the Archaeological Museum

Archaeological Museum
Since 2006, it has replaced the civic museum near the central station. Located next to the Santo Spirito Abbey in the district of the same name, it is housed in a modern building designed by architect Franco Minissi. The museum contains a vast collection of archaeological artifacts from the earliest settlements in the Salso valley and surrounding areas. Most artifacts originate from the necropolises of Mazzarino and the indigenous sites of Gibil Gabib and Sabucina, located a few kilometers from Caltanissetta's urban center. Positioned on heights overlooking the Salso River—one of antiquity's primary commercial and military routes—these sites have yielded important collections, among the most important in Sicily, including funerary objects, red-figure Attic vases, bronze and ceramic tools, and artifacts. The museum also preserves the renowned Sabucina shrine.

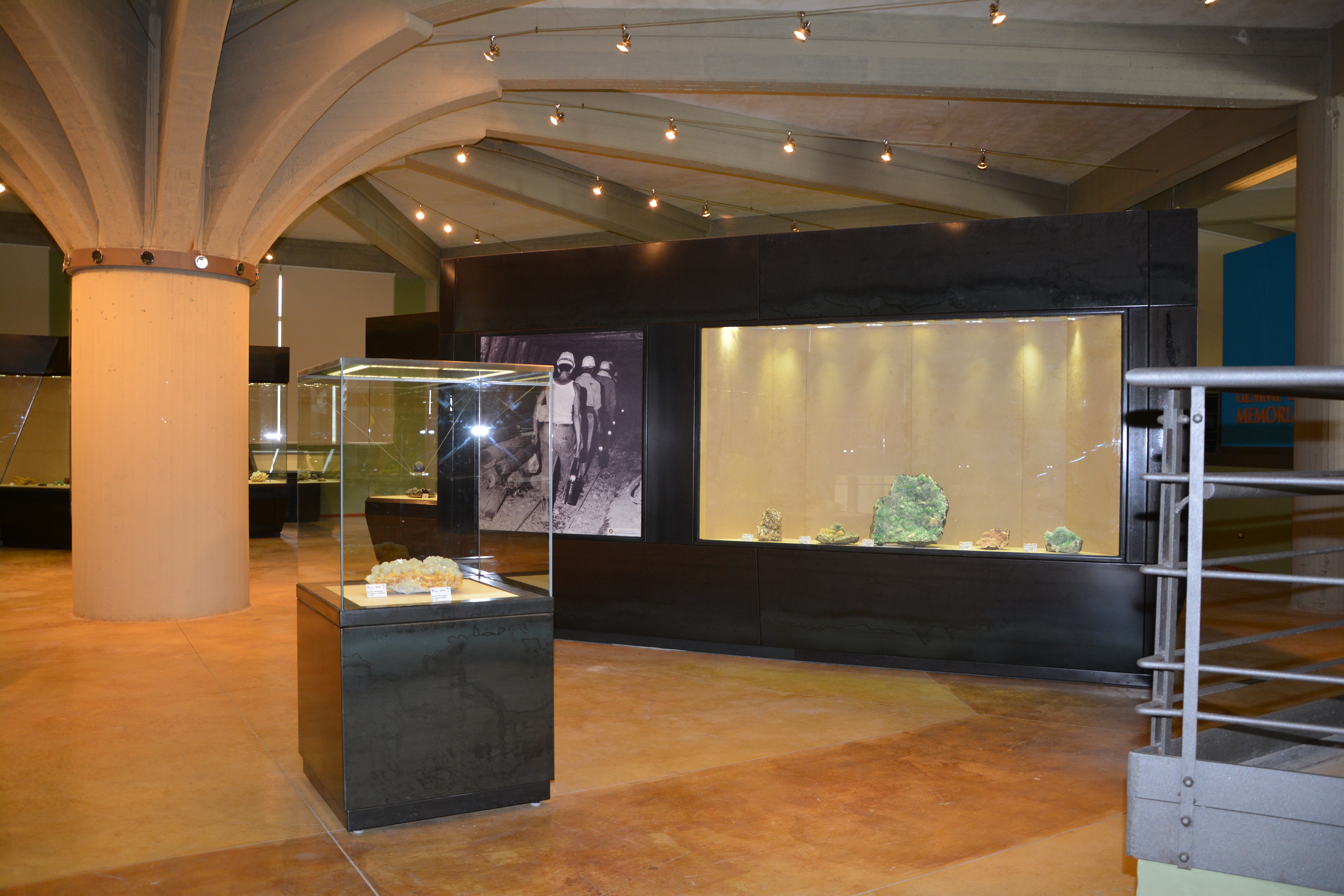
Interior of the Mineralogical Museum

Mineralogical, Paleontological, and Sulfur Mine Museum
Previously located within the former mining institute "Sebastiano Mottura", it was relocated to a more modern, purpose-built facility inaugurated on December 15, 2012. Through exhibits of minerals (notably sulfur samples), rocks, fossils, and specialized equipment, the museum documents the historical exploitation of sulfur mines across the territory of Caltanissetta. It houses collections of minerals and fossils, including items of exceptional mineralogical value, as well as geological maps, topographic plans of sulfur mines, and a rich archive of vintage photographs. A collection of macrofossils, cataloged stratigraphically from the Silurian to the Quaternary period, is also displayed.

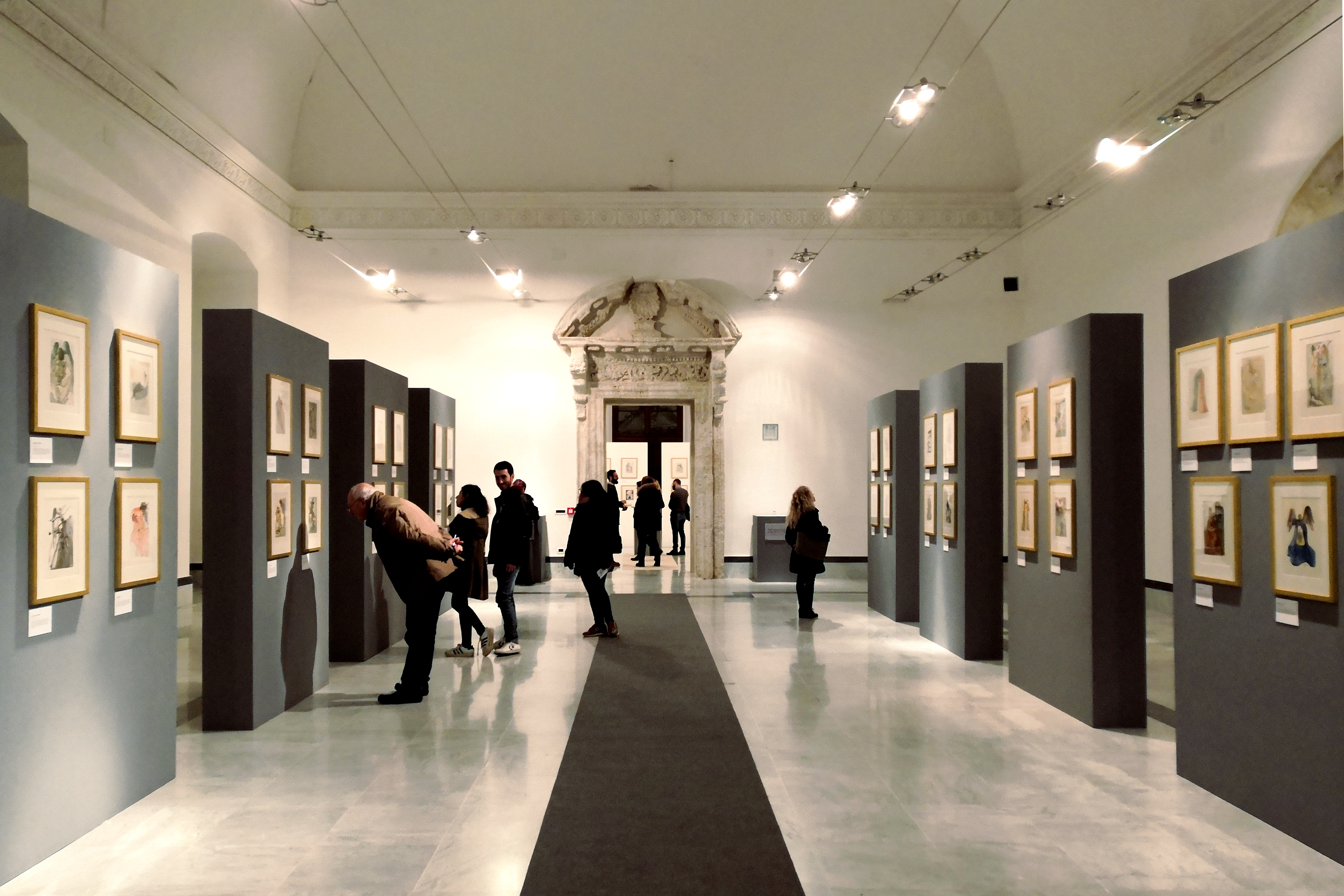
Interior of Palazzo Moncada during an exhibition on Salvador Dalí

Civic Art Gallery
Occupying part of Palazzo Moncada, it hosts both permanent and temporary exhibitions. In 2010, the Tripisciano Museum was inaugurated within the gallery, showcasing a permanent exhibit of works by sculptor Michele Tripisciano, donated by the artist to the municipality upon his death. These sculptures, mostly made of plaster, are displayed in four themed rooms. The gallery also features works by other local artists, including Giuseppe Frattallone and Francesco Guadagnuolo.

Diocesan Museum
Located on Viale Regina Margherita at the Bishop's Palace, it houses collections from numerous churches in the area, offering a vivid testament to the cultural vibrancy of local artists between the 17th and 18th centuries. Its holdings include paintings, silver vases, sacred vestments, furnishings, and valuable illuminated codices.

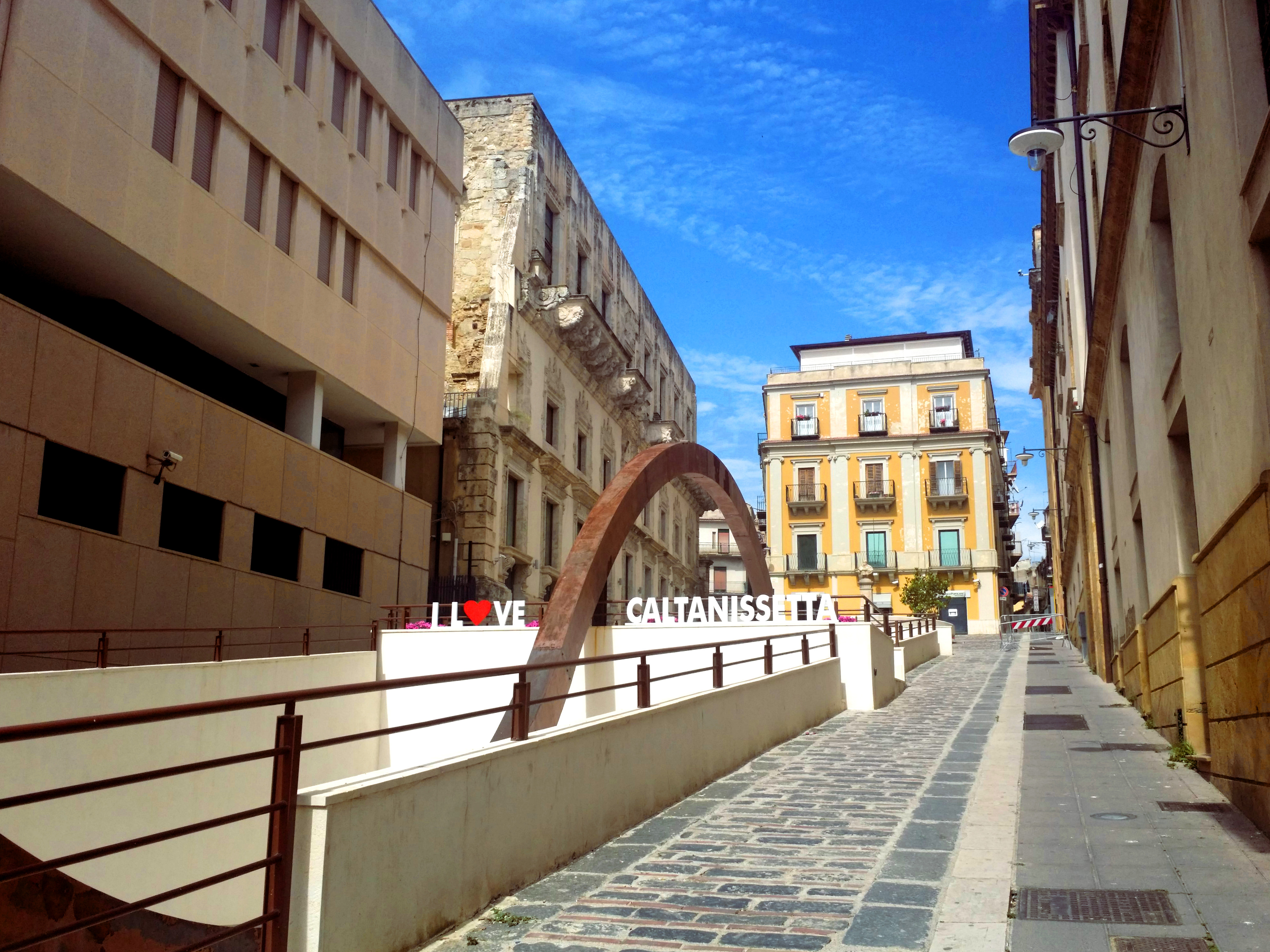
Exterior of the Museum of Contemporary Art

Museum of Contemporary Art
Situated on Salita Matteotti, it hosts temporary exhibitions. Opened in 2017, it was created using the underground spaces of an air-raid shelter built during World War II. The museum comprises ten rooms linked by a central corridor—corresponding to the original shelter—and a new entrance area. Its exterior is marked by a curved metallic structure.

Museum of Folklore and Popular Traditions
This exhibition space, set up in the basement of the San Pio X parish on Via Napoleone Colajanni, houses fifteen of the sixteen vare—plaster and papier-mâché sculptural groups crafted in the late 19th century—that parade through the historic center on the evening of Holy Thursday. A proposal to relocate the vare to a new purpose-built "Museum of the Vare" in the former GIL building was abandoned due to opposition from the vare owners, reluctant to move them to the new site.

=== Theater ===
The city is associated with the Teatro Stabile Nisseno, a theatrical organization established in 1996, building on the legacy of the "Piccolo Stabile Nisseno" and, earlier, the "I quindici" theater group from the 1970s. With approximately 130 performances per season across Sicily and southern Italy, SIAE estimates rank it among the top semi-professional companies in central-southern Italy.

=== Cinema ===
Caltanissetta serves as the setting for the first part of the 1958 neorealist film L'amore più bello, directed by Glauco Pellegrini and starring the young Edoardo Nevola.

=== Cuisine ===
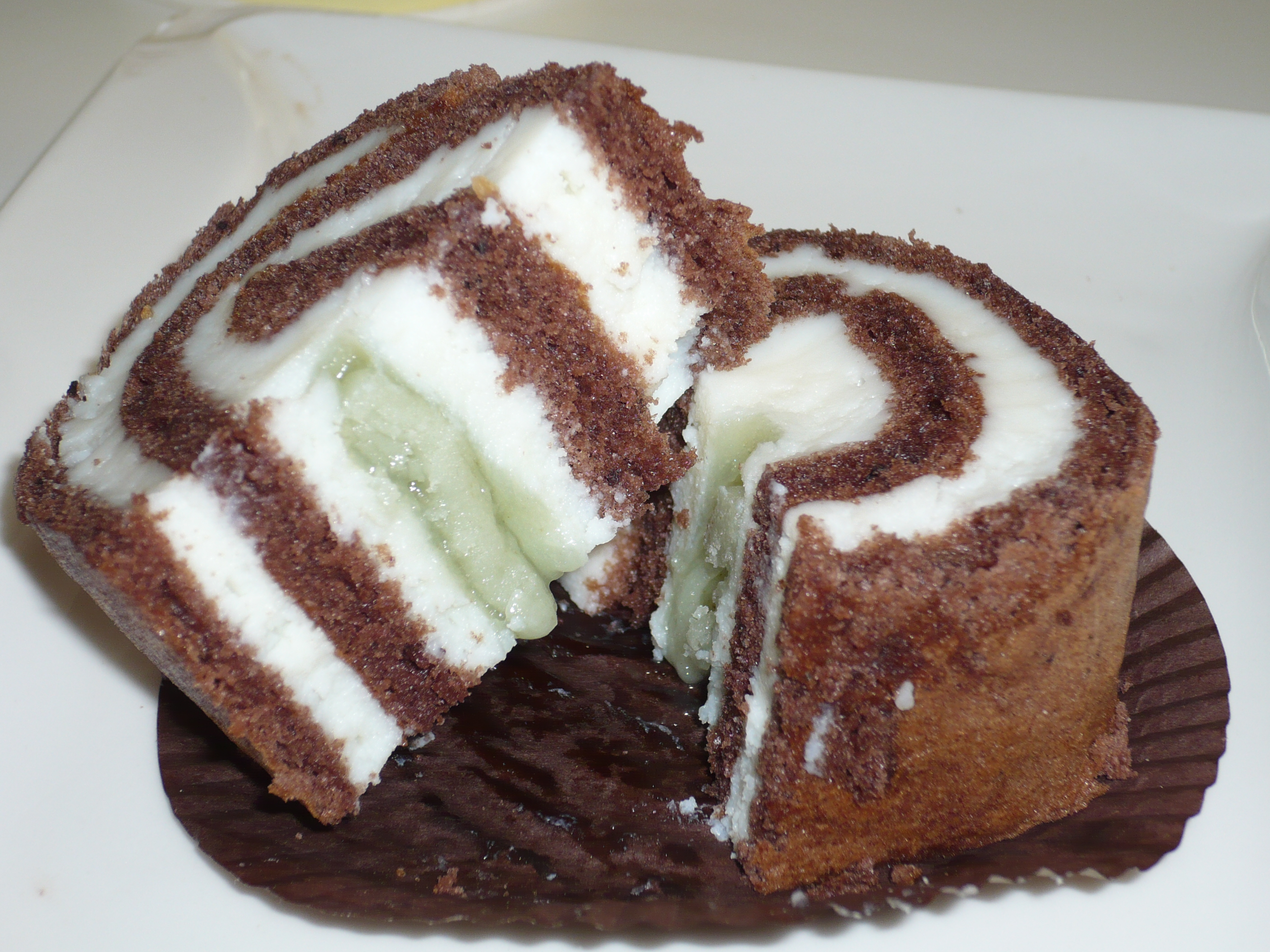
Rollò

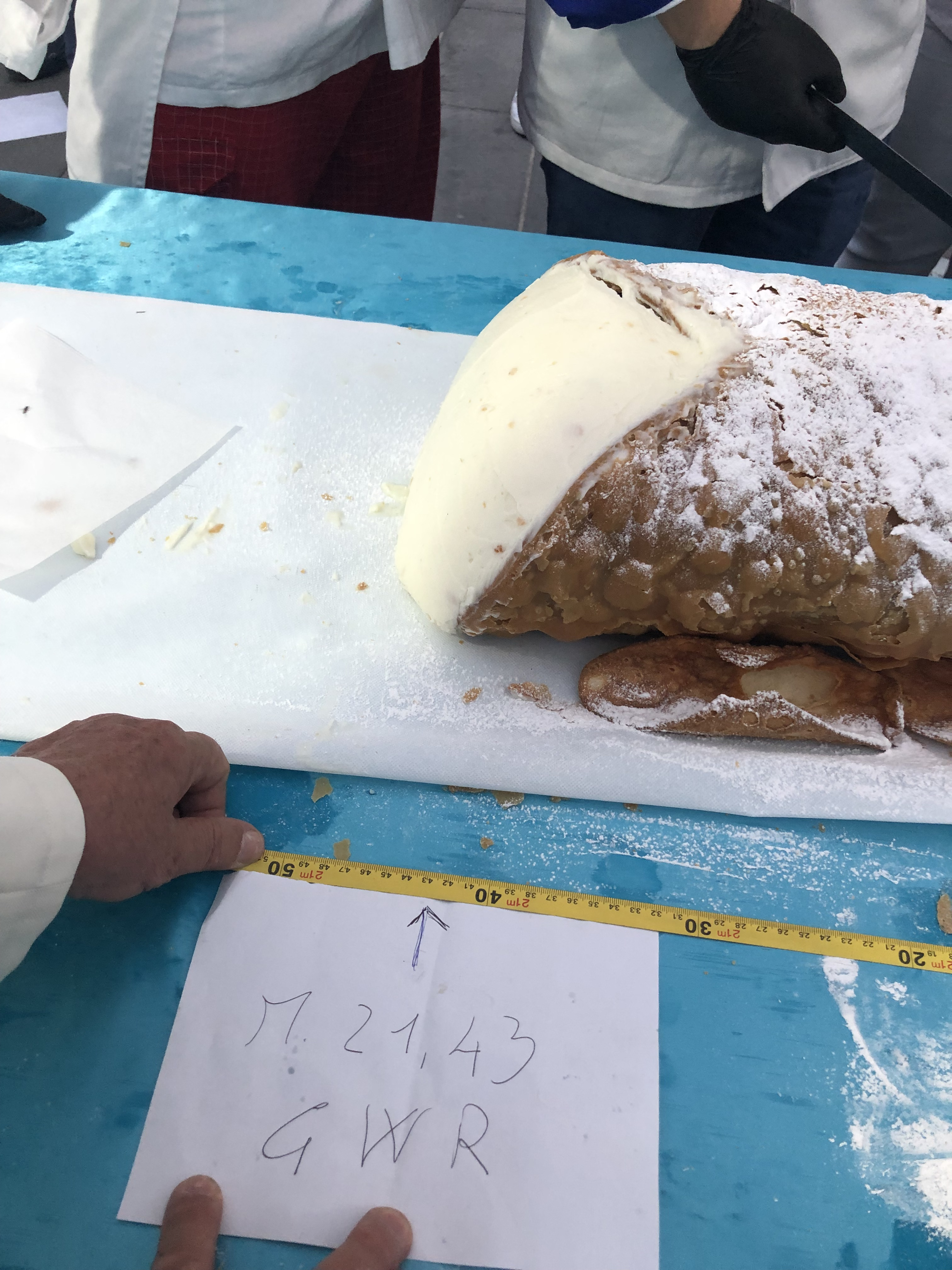
Measuring the record for the world's longest cannolo

Beyond traditional inland Sicilian dishes—such as the first course pesto nisseno and the second course Caltanissetta-style chicken, alongside the focaccia nissena, a typical street food—the city is distinguished by its refined pastry tradition. This is dominated by ricotta-based sweets and others, including the Caltanissetta cannolo, the raviola di ricotta, paste velate, and the rollò, as well as biscuit varieties like raffiolini.

The Caltanissetta variant of torrone, made with almonds and pistachios and characterized by a meticulous, lengthy preparation process, holds particular significance.

In 2021, funding was secured for the construction of the Mediterranean Lifestyle Prototypical Kitchen Laboratory in the premises of the former prison, later a scientific high school, on Via Tumminelli, as part of the broader First Worldwide Mediterranean Lifestyle Park project.

On September 11, 2022, Caltanissetta set the record for the world's longest cannolo.

== Sights ==
=== Religious architecture ===
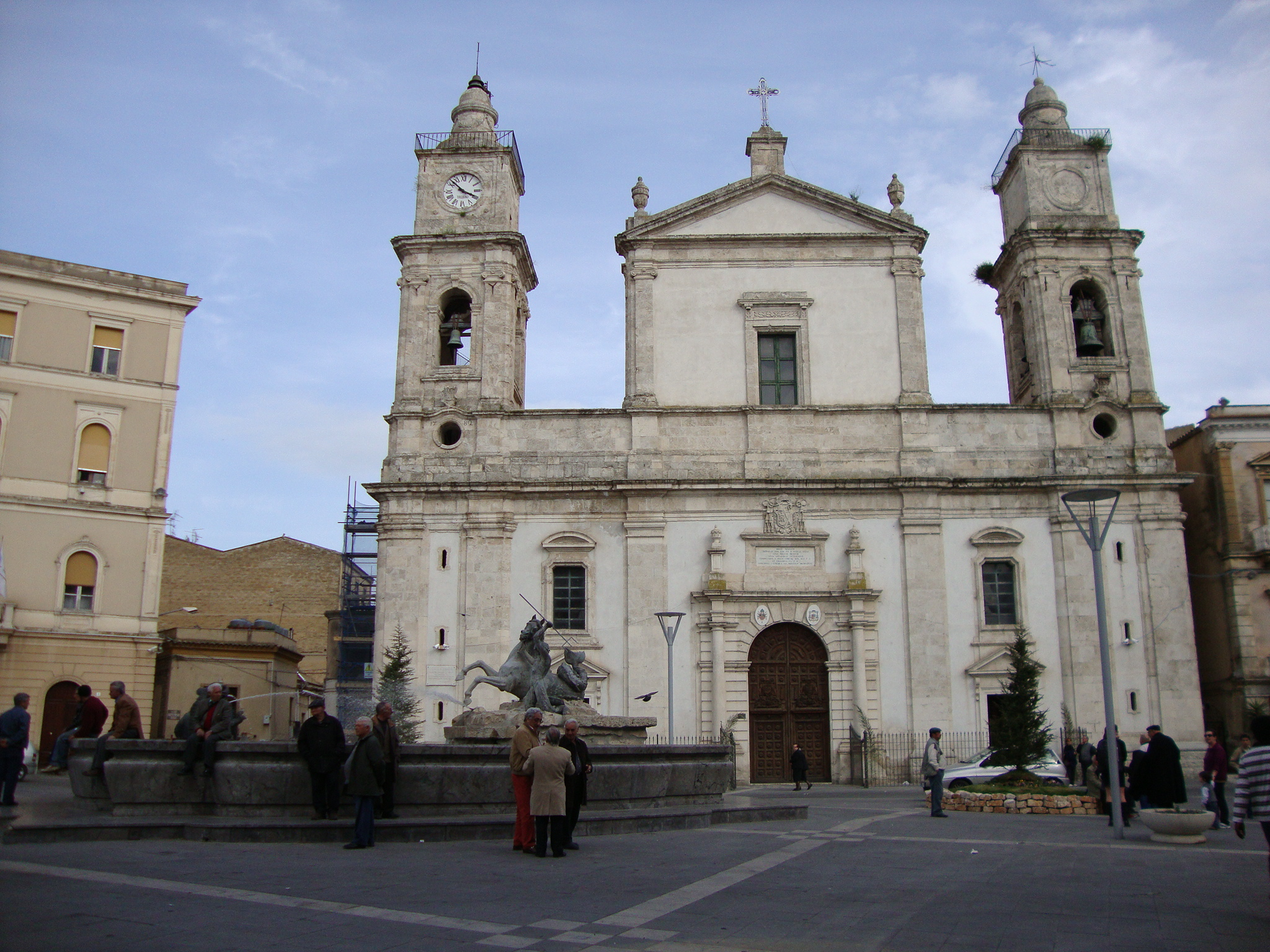
Caltanissetta Cathedral

Santa Maria la Nova Cathedral
This is Caltanissetta's cathedral, housing the Cathedra of the Bishop of Caltanissetta, located on Piazza Garibaldi. Built between 1560 and 1620 and opened for worship in 1622, it was named to distinguish it from the older mother church, constructed in the 14th century near Pietrarossa Castle and later dubbed "la Vetere." Severely damaged in the 1943 bombings, its interior features three naves, with the central one adorned with frescoes by Flemish painter Guglielmo Borremans. To the right of the main altar stands a wooden statue of Saint Michael, the city's patron, crafted by sculptor Stefano Li Volsi.

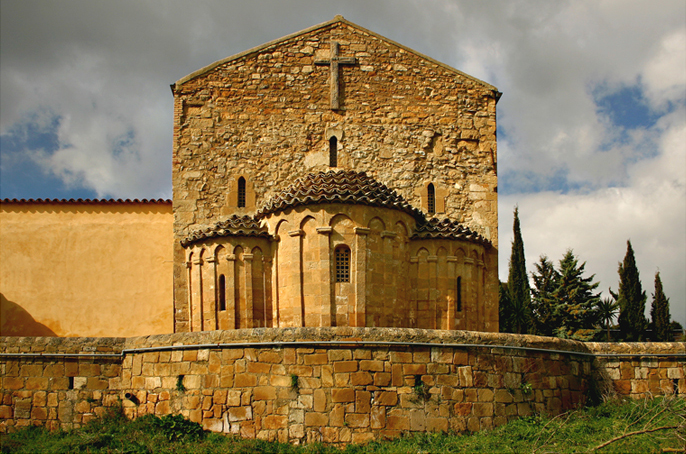
Exterior view of the apses of the Santo Spirito Abbey

Santo Spirito Abbey
Commissioned by Count Roger, this church was consecrated in 1153. It comprises a single tri-apsed nave and boasts remarkable artistic elements, including a baptismal font and numerous interior frescoes.

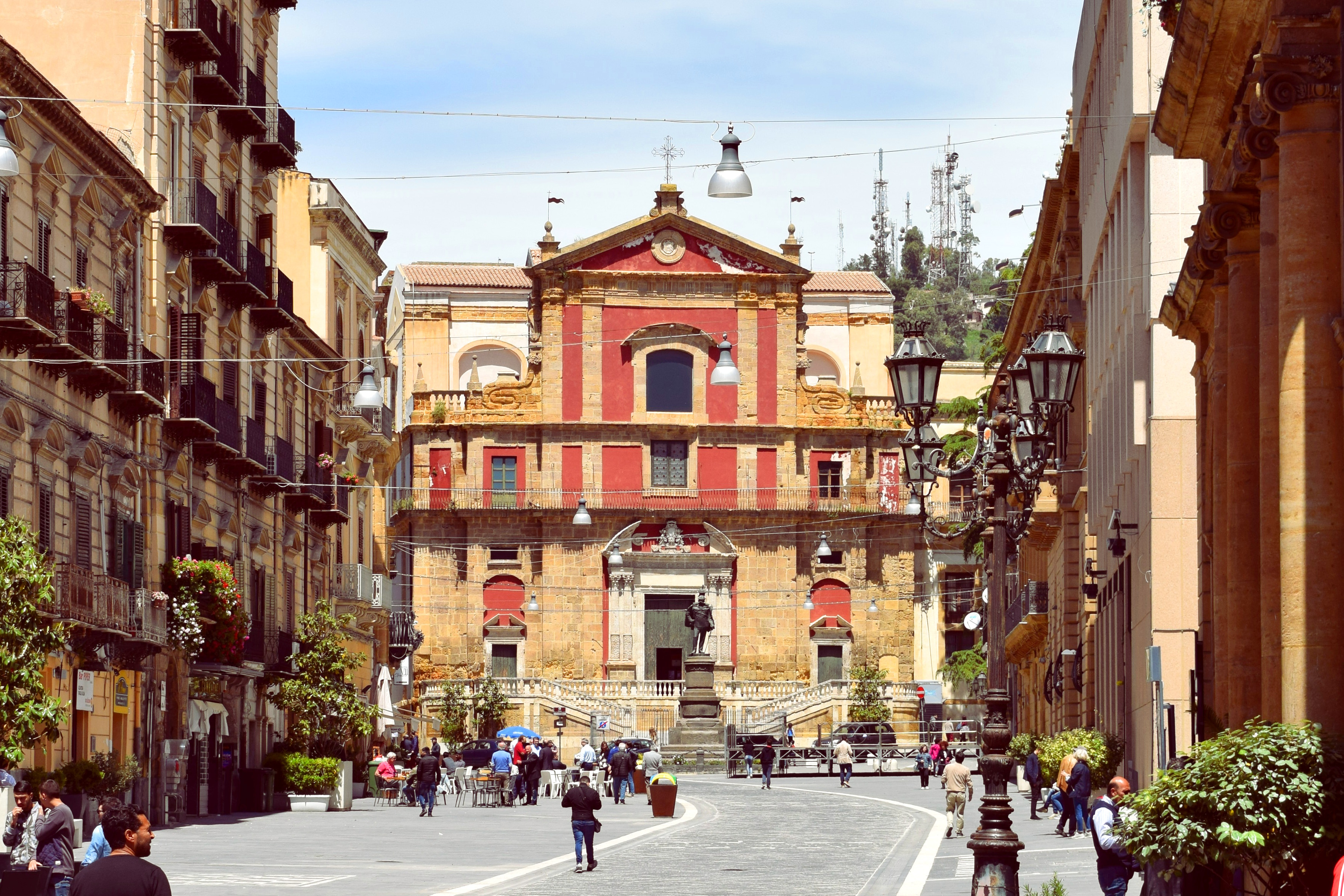
Sant'Agata al Collegio Church

Sant'Agata Church and Jesuit College
Erected between 1600 and 1610 on a pre-existing church also dedicated to Saint Agatha, the church's adjacent Jesuit college began construction in 1589 and was completed in the mid-19th century. The church, designed in a Greek cross layout, is clad in marble and stucco, with frescoes largely repainted post-war by local artist Luigi Garbato. The Baroque-style college houses the Luciano Scarabelli municipal library and the Vincenzo Bellini Institute of Higher Musical Studies.

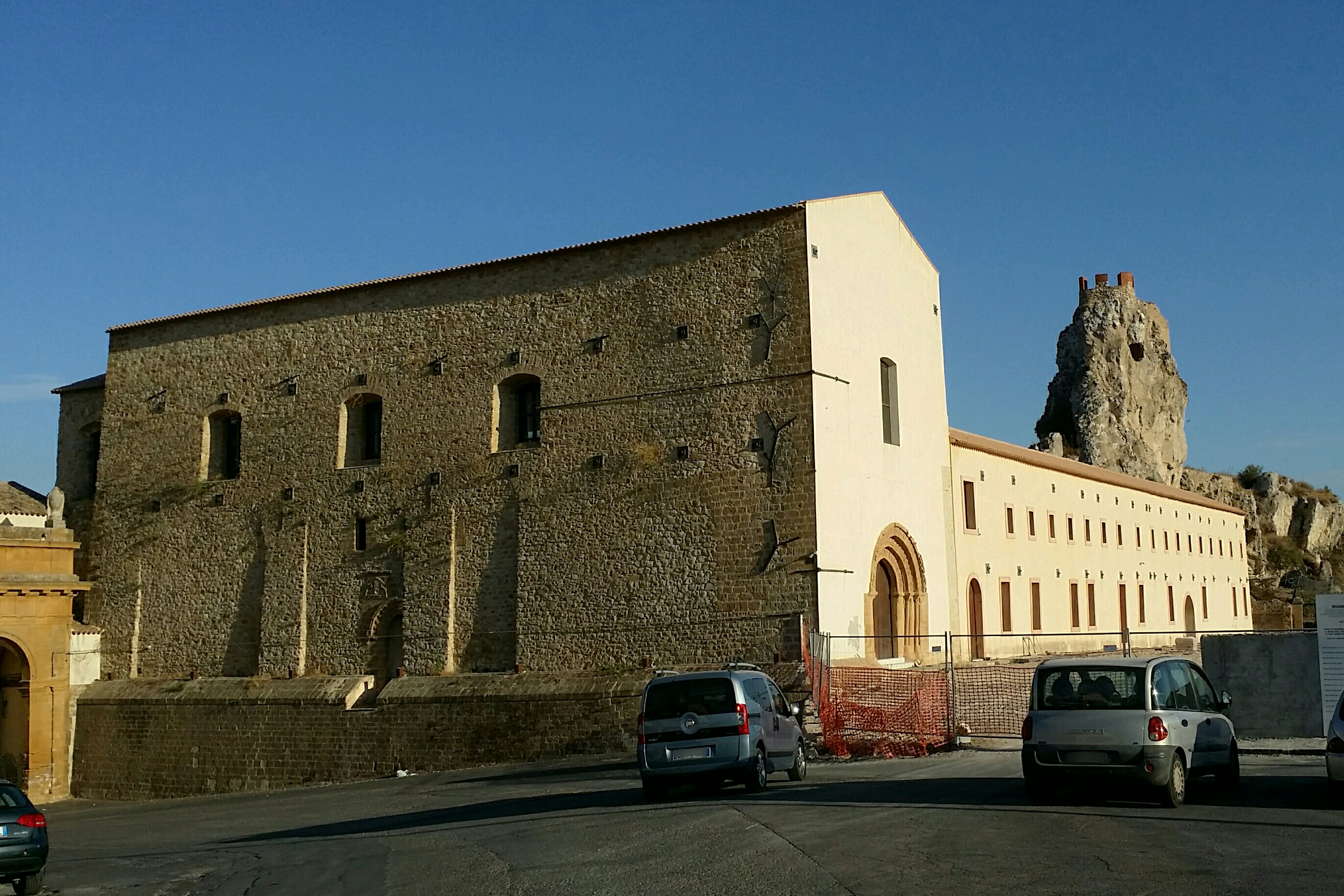
Santa Maria degli Angeli Church

Santa Maria degli Angeli Church
Known as "la Vetere," it lies adjacent to Pietrarossa Castle. Built between the 13th and 14th centuries, it served as the city's parish church from 1239 to 1622, succeeding the Santo Spirito Abbey. Deconsecrated after Italian unification and transferred to the Ministry of War, it fell into decline but underwent extensive restoration in the early 2010s. Notable is its western main portal, adorned with sandstone friezes and a pointed archivolt.

San Giovanni Church
Located in the oldest part of the historic center near the San Domenico Church, it was founded in the 11th century but underwent multiple alterations. An 18th-century overhaul erased its medieval features, and it was destroyed in the 1943 bombing, rebuilt in 1945. Its interior features frescoes by Pollaci. Also called "del Purgatorio" due to a 17th-century confraternity based there.

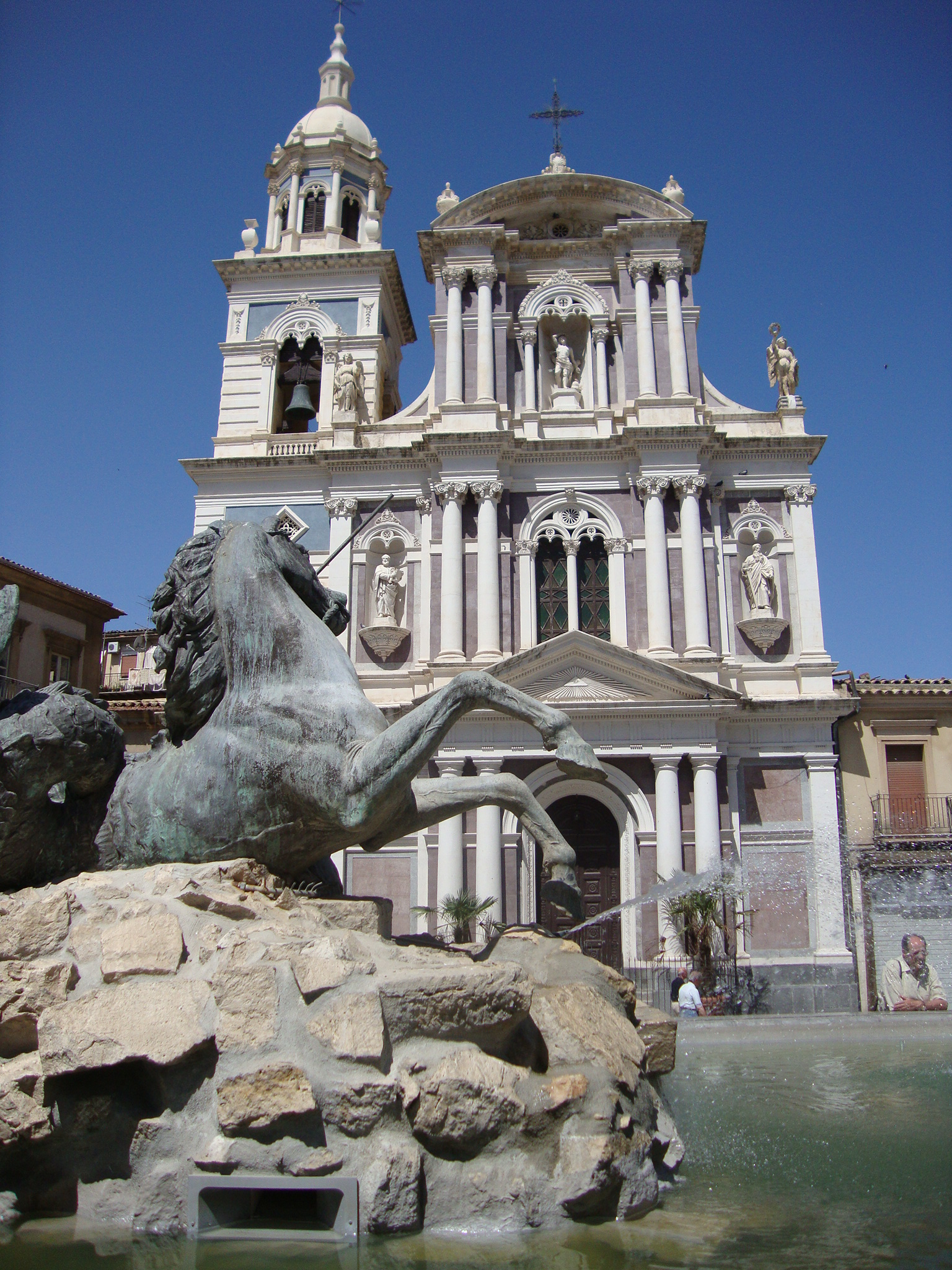
San Sebastiano Church; part of the Tripisciano Triton fountain sculpture is visible in the foreground

San Sebastiano Church
Built around the 16th century as a tribute to the saint for deliverance from the plague, once home to the butchers' congregation, it sits on Piazza Garibaldi opposite the cathedral. Modified and restored several times, it was extended lengthwise in 1711 to accommodate the square, with enhancements to its interior and façade. The elegant façade, designed by architect Pasquale Saetta in the late 19th century, features columns of all three classical orders and statues by Biancardi.

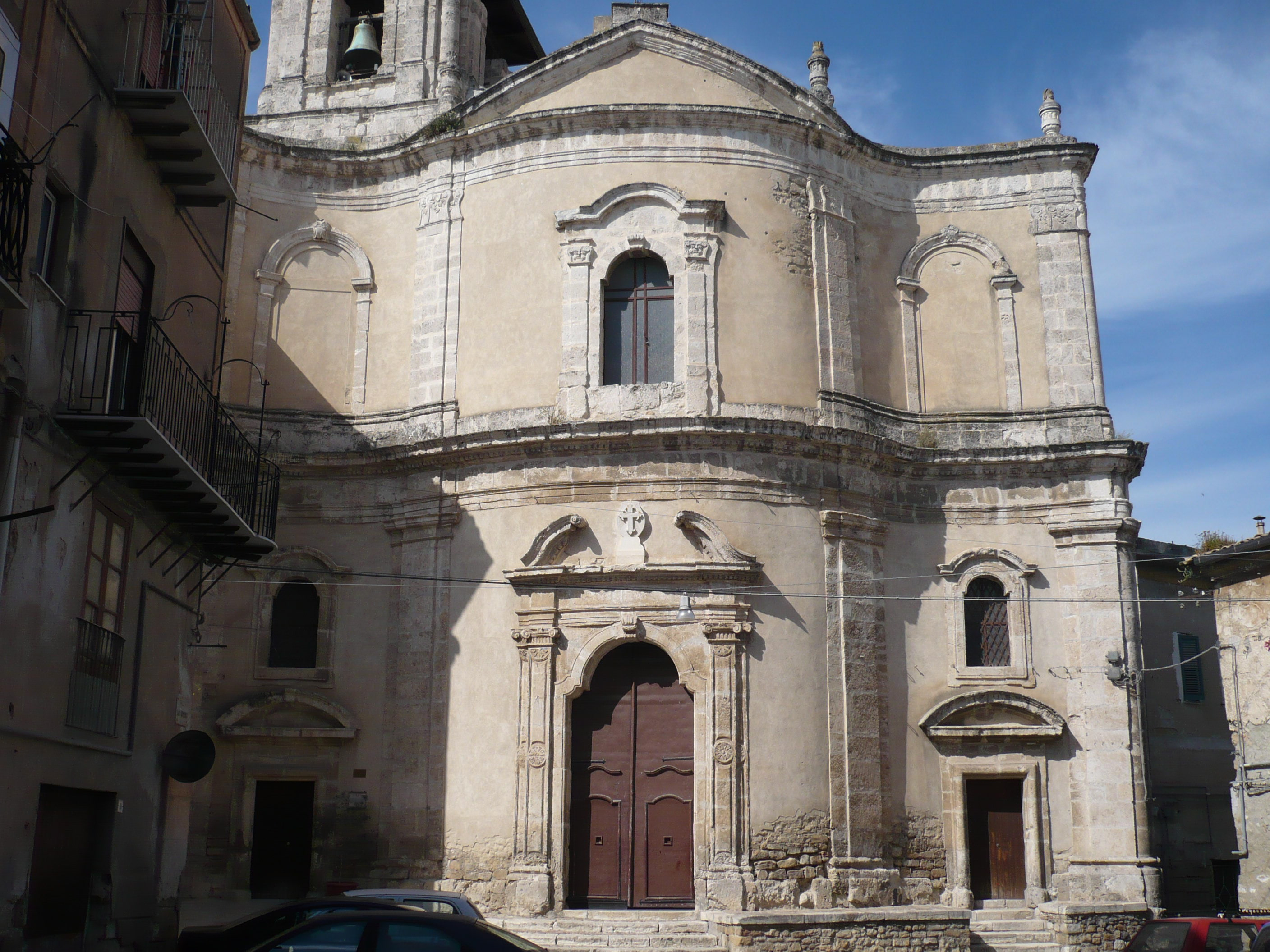
San Domenico Church

San Domenico Church
Founded in 1400 after the Moncada arrival, it was built in the Angeli district, then lacking churches. Its construction ties to the city and Montcada history: Antonio Moncada, to inherit his title in 1458, abandoned the Dominican order, funding the church and convent as compensation. Continually enriched, its façade—centrally convex, laterally concave—was added in the 17th century, as was a valuable painting of the Madonna of the Rosary by Tuscan Filippo Paladini, depicting Francesco II Moncada's children. Recent findings reveal a hidden crypt, possibly among the city's oldest sites.

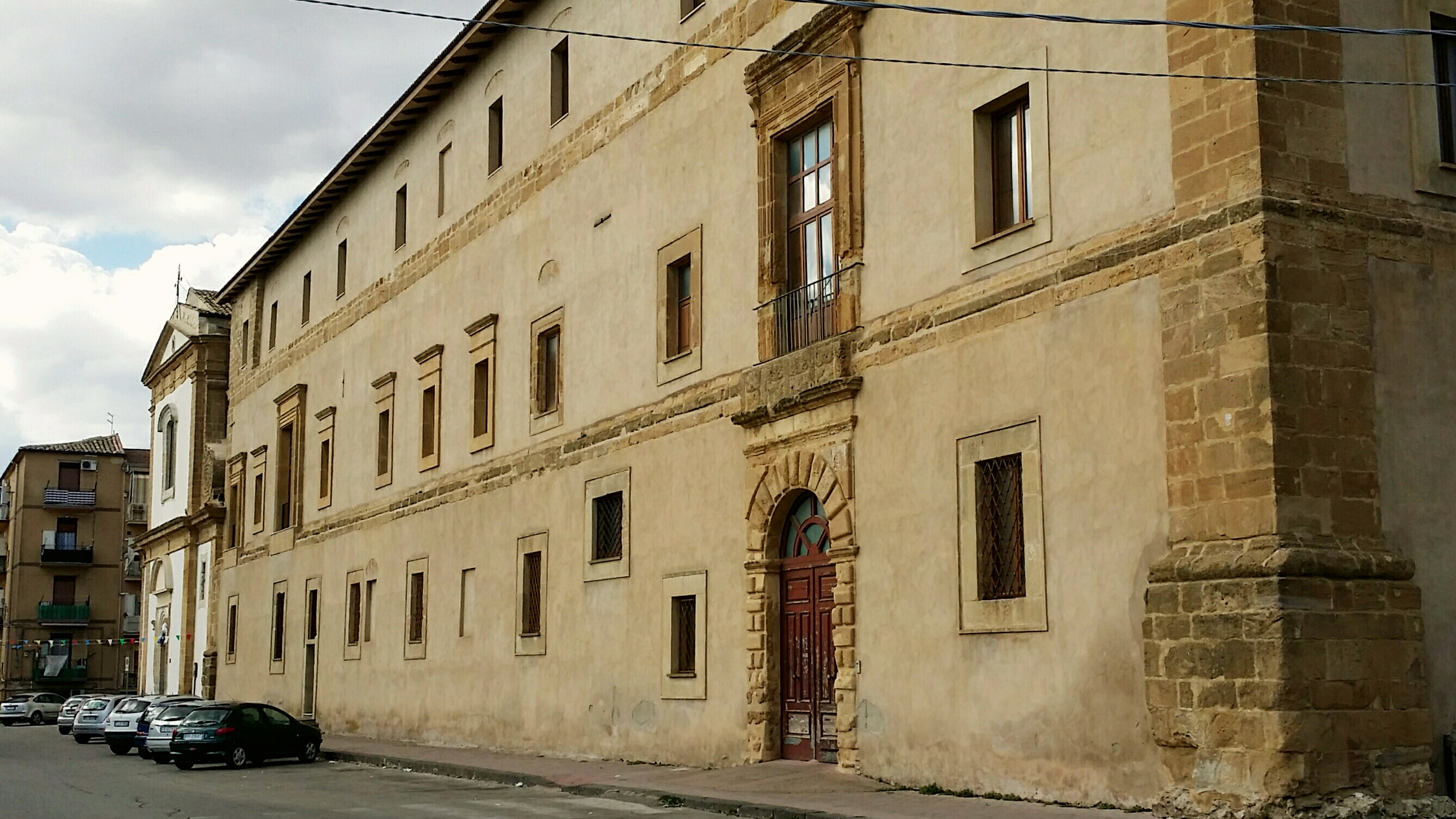
The former Benedictine Santa Flavia Monastery

Santa Flavia Church and Monastery
Situated on Sant'Anna hill's scenic slopes near the historic center's edge, they were commissioned by Maria d'Aragona, widow of Count Francesco II Moncada. The convent was built between the late 16th and early 17th centuries, while the church, atop the earlier Santa Venera church, was completed in 1793. Used as a military barracks in the 19th and 20th centuries, it fell into ruin but was restored between the late 20th century and early 2000s, uncovering the Santa Venera façade.

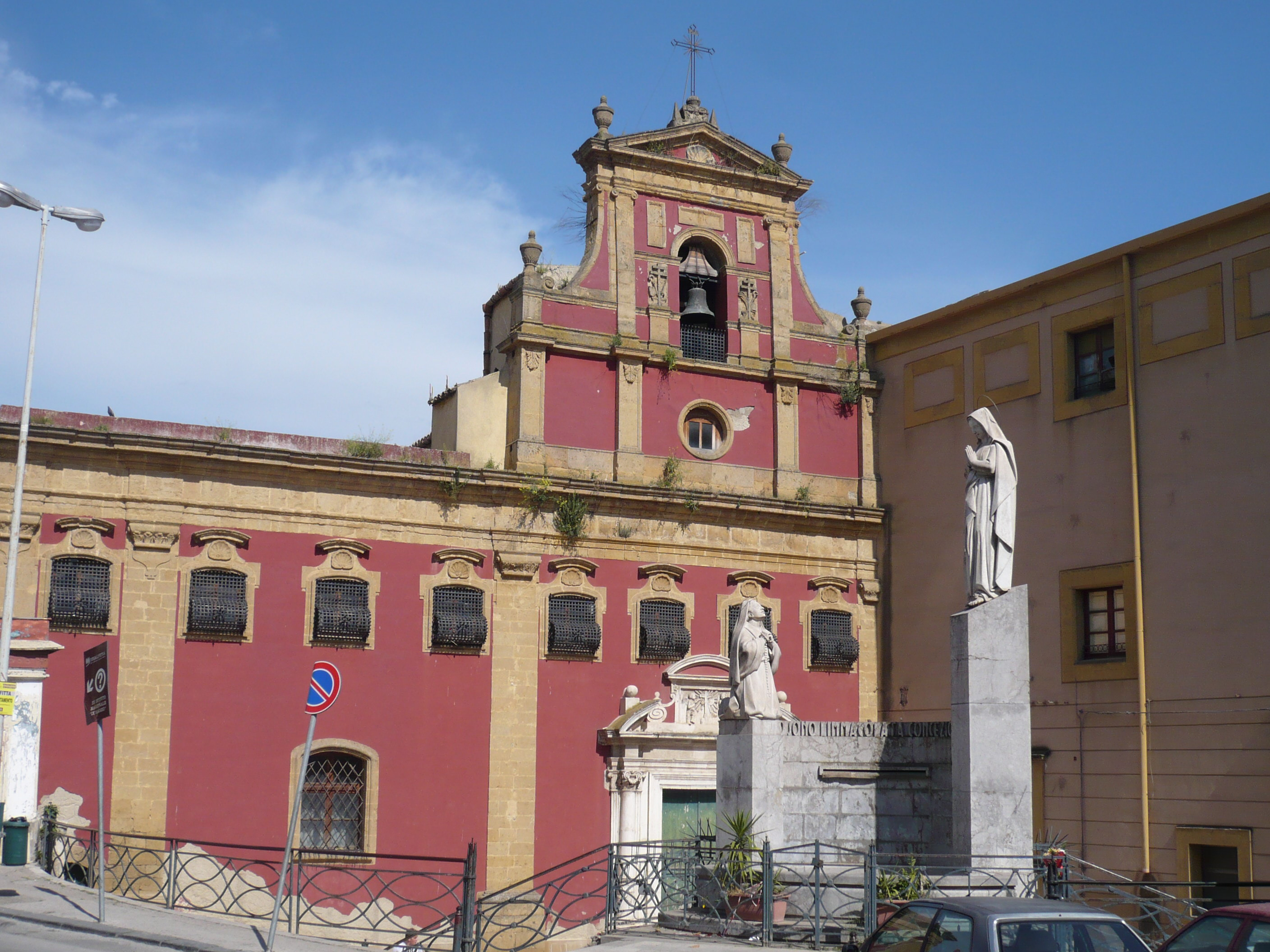
Santa Croce Church

Santa Croce Church and Monastery
Built in 1531 by Count Antonio III Moncada for Benedictine nuns, the church and monastery were renamed in 1590 after Countess Moncada donated a stone cross relic. In 1660, near the Abbey of Santo Spirito, a farmer found a stone with a natural image of the Cross. When it was found to be unaltered, it became a holy reliquary. The single-nave church features a sober 17th-century façade with sandstone blocks and jalousie windows along its length.

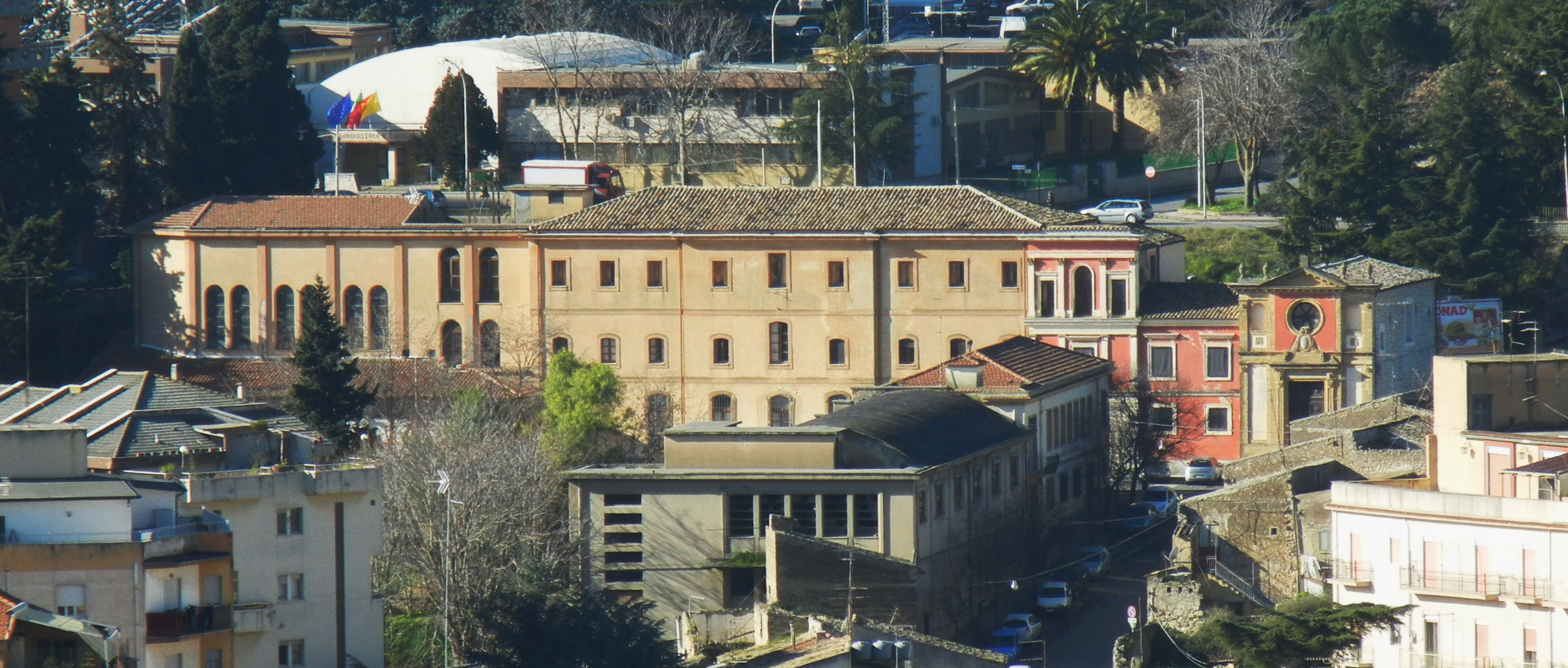
San Michele Church and Convent

San Michele Church and Convent
Their construction stems from visions of Capuchin friar Francesco Giarratana, who in 1625 saw Archangel Michael barring a plague victim's entry to Caltanissetta, later confirmed by a corpse found at the site. The original chapel decayed but was rebuilt in 1837 after the city survived a cholera outbreak. The convent, built in 1888 by Father Angelico Lipani, was the city's third Capuchin convent, following those in Xiboli and Pigni.

Signore della Città Sanctuary
Originally a church for Saint Nicholas of Bari, since the 18th century it has housed the Black Christ, a wooden crucifix co-patron of the city. Key figures include Friar Angelico Lipani, its 19th-century rector, and the Testasecca counts, whose donations expanded and embellished it. The Order of the Franciscan Sisters of the Lord of the City and the charitable institute of the same name were founded there. Inside are statues, including a Saint Francis by Biangardi, and 1950s mosaics by Bevilacqua adorning the altar.

Sant'Antonio alla Saccara Church
Built in the 17th century, it was enlarged in 1866 and consecrated to the Madonna with the name of Santa Maria di Montemaggiore; the current name dates back to 1877. In 1911 the "Boccone del povero" institute was founded. It is located in the district of Cozzarello, also known as Saccara.

Santa Maria della Provvidenza Church
Located in its eponymous district, it features a façade and bell tower from the early 20th century.

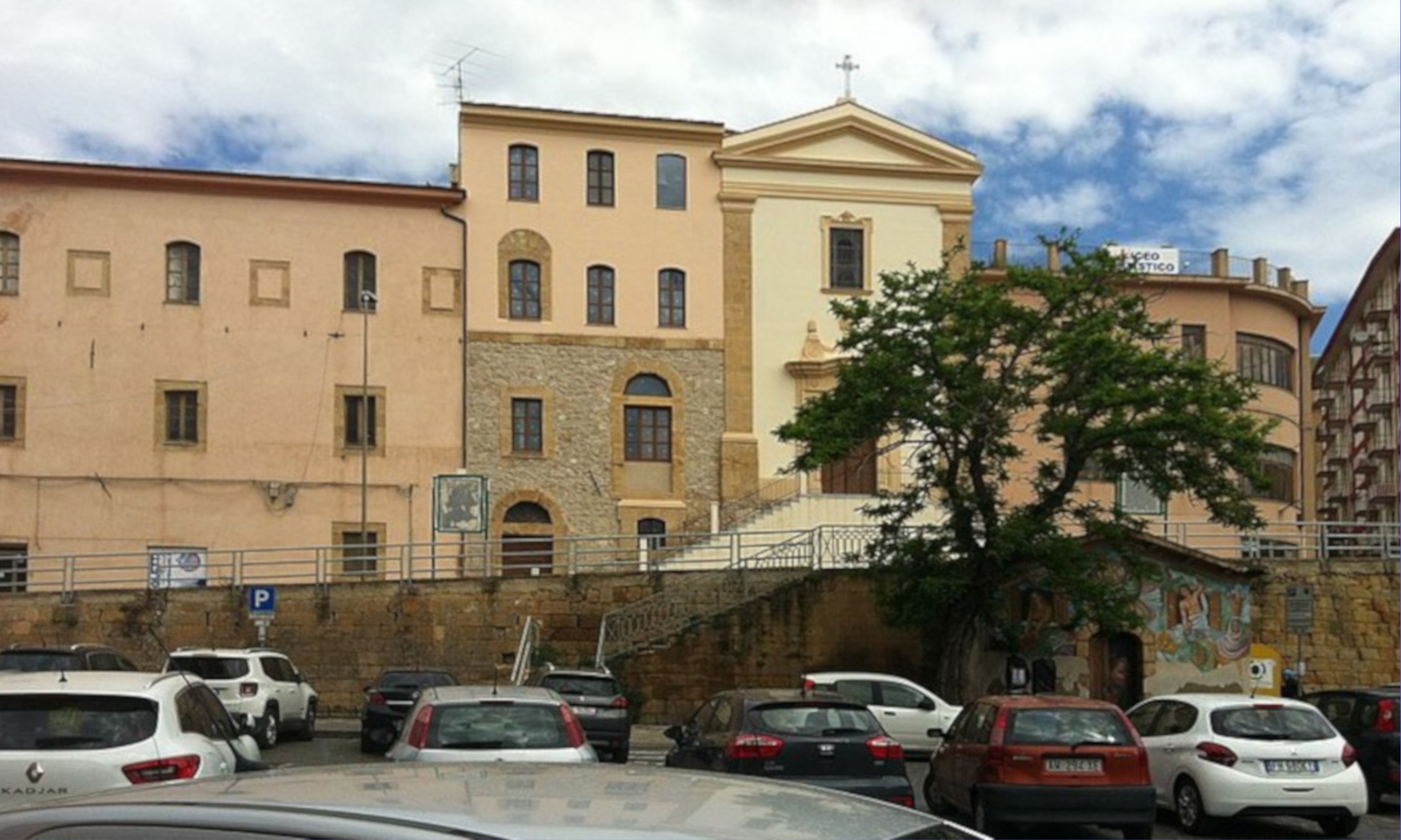
Madonna della Grazia Church

Santa Maria della Grazia Church
A 17th-century church built on a votive chapel dedicated to the Madonna della Grazia, it has a single nave with lateral altars and a richly stucco-decorated barrel vault. The main altar holds a Madonna della Grazia painting by Pietro Antonio Novelli.

Villa Cappellano
This is a monastery-farm built by the Jesuits in the 16th century and used as their summer residence until 1843, when they replaced it with the new house at Balate. It has several buildings that overlook a quadrangular courtyard; the main building has a typically Baroque style façade. The chapel dedicated to the Sacred Heart of Jesus is also part of the complex, and is where the wooden frame kept at the mother church of Delia comes from. Now abandoned, it is located 2 km from Delia.

Casina dei Gesuiti alle Balate
Built by the Jesuits in 1843 to replace Villa Cappellano as a summer retreat, it was expropriated after the Unification of Italy and has been owned by the Municipality of Caltanissetta since 1872. Today it is the residence of the Angelo Di Rocco Institute.

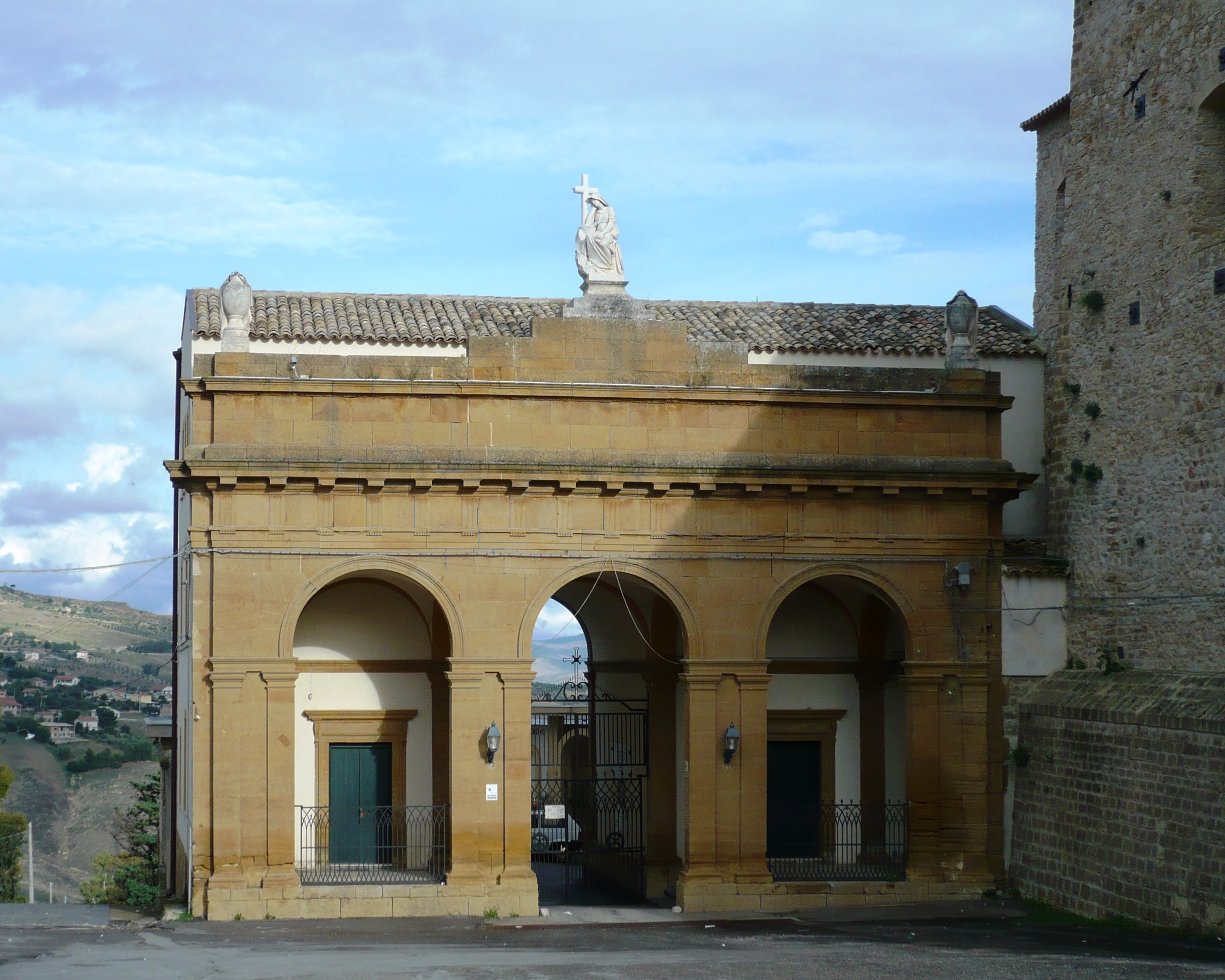
Angeli Monumental Cemetery, entrance adjacent to the Santa Maria degli Angeli Church

Angeli Monumental Cemetery
More commonly known as the “cemetery of the Angels”, it is the municipal cemetery that was built at the end of 1878 near the church of Santa Maria degli Angeli, the adjoining convent of the Friars Minor and the castle of Pietrarossa.

Carusi Cemetery
A small cemetery near the Gessolungo sulfur mine, created after the mining disaster of November 12, 1881, to bury nineteen carusi, nine unidentified, who perished there.

=== Civil architecture ===
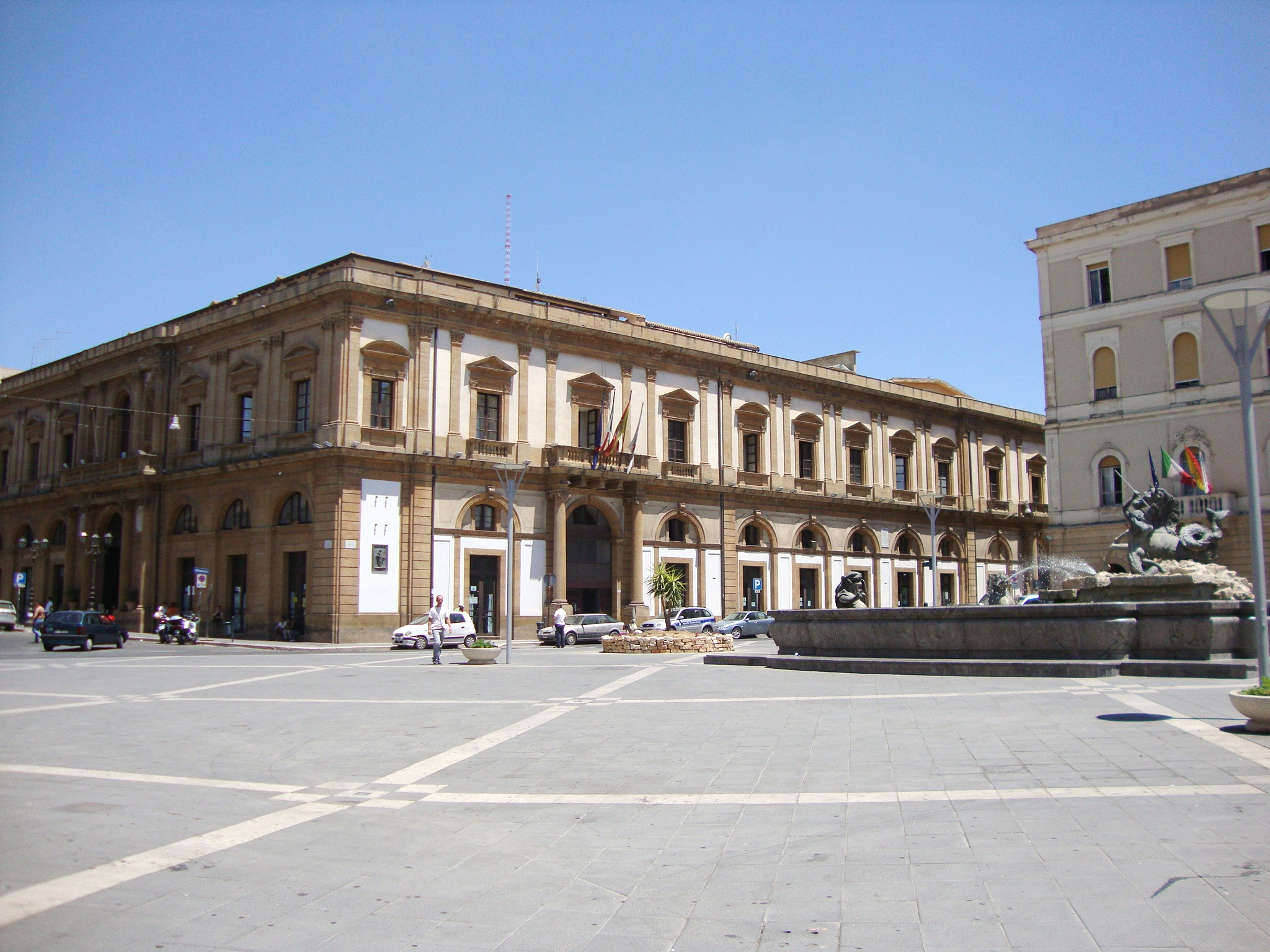
Palazzo del Carmine, Caltanissetta's municipal seat

Palazzo del Carmine
Construction began around 1371 outside the city walls, near a rural chapel dedicated to Saint James. By order of Guglielmo Peralta and his wife Eleanor of Aragon, daughter of the Marquis of Randazzo, a Carmelite Discalced Order convent and the Maria Santissima Annunziata church (known as Madonna del Carmine) were built nearby. Urban expansion by the 16th century integrated the complex into the city, flanked by the new San Giacomo and San Paolino churches. In the 19th century, after religious orders were suppressed, the Carmelites left, the convent was demolished for the municipal seat, and the adjacent churches were razed. The theater (Teatro Regina Margherita) replaced the recessed Salvatore church site. The palace, now the town hall, has an enriched façade, with only fragments of the original convent walls remaining.

Teatro Margherita
Adjacent to Palazzo del Carmine, inaugurated in 1875 and named after Queen Margherita of Savoy who visited Caltanissetta in 1881, it flourished culturally until World War II. Post-war damage and neglect led to its closure in the 1970s after it lost its security clearance. After more than 20 years of restoration, it was reopened in 1997.

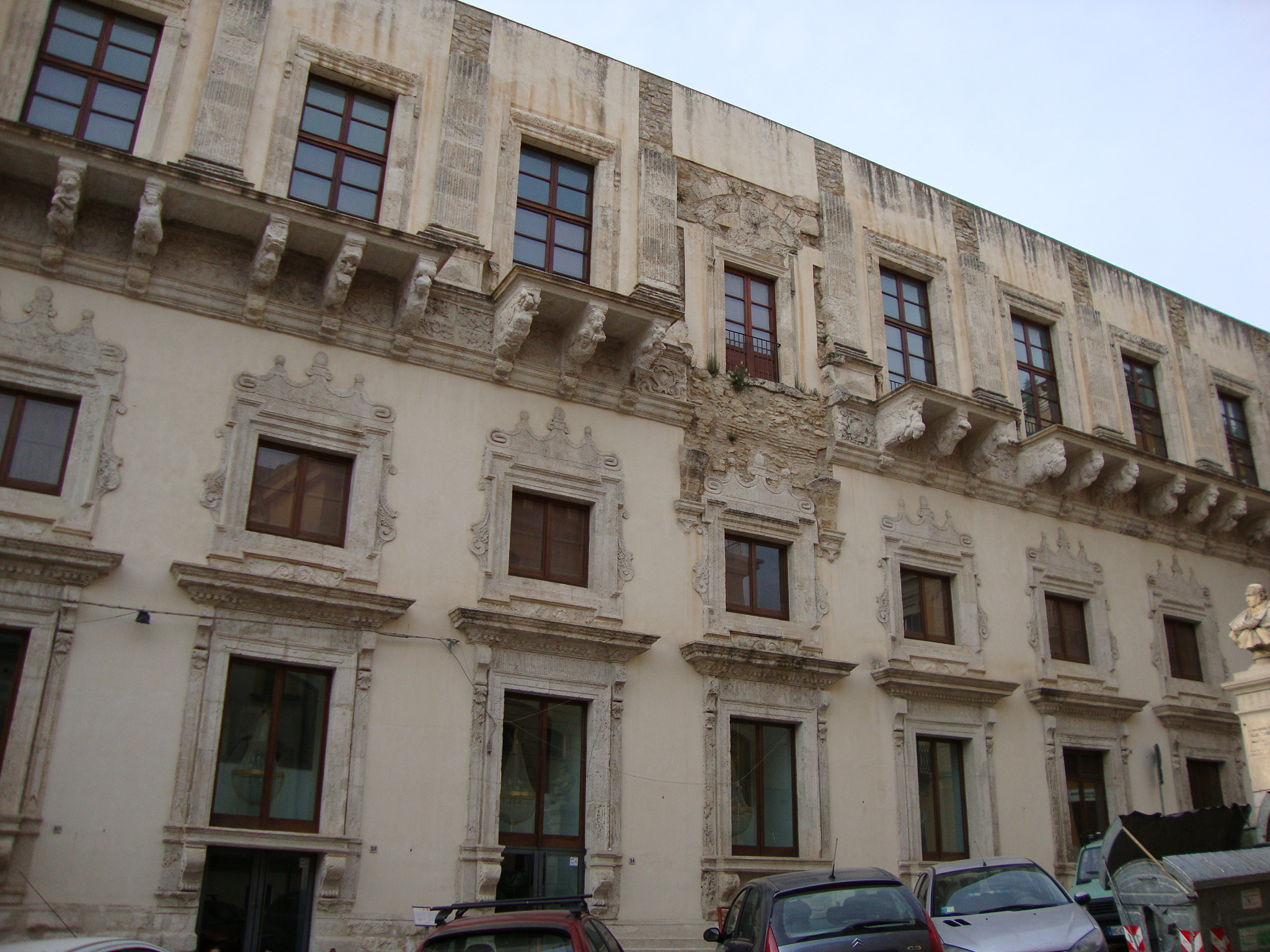
Façade of Palazzo Moncada with Baroque zoomorphic and anthropomorphic friezes

Palazzo Moncada
Built in the early 17th century by Prince Luis Guillermo de Moncada, it was intended as a grand Sicilian noble residence, evident in its scale and ornate balcony friezes. Construction halted when Guglielmo became Viceroy of Valencia and moved to Spain. In 1915, a theater with a gallery was added, followed by a courtyard cinema (first Cineteatro Trieste, then Cineteatro Bauffremont, and since 2009 Multisala Moncada). Since 2010, some of the rooms have housed art galleries with permanent exhibitions on the Montcada and on the local sculptor Michele Tripisciano.

Palazzo della Provincia
Designed in the 19th century by architect Giuseppe Di Bartolo to house provincial and municipal offices, its complexity led engineer Agostino Tacchini to scale it down in 1870 for provincial use only, completed in 1897. Contributors include local artists Luigi Greco (council chamber and main staircase), Michele Tripisciano (sculptures), and Catanese Pasquale Sozzi (interiors).

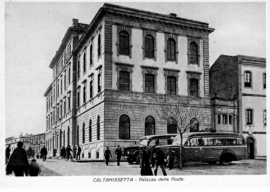
The Palazzo delle Poste in the 1950s

Palazzo delle Poste
Built in the 1920s after demolishing the 1637 Sant’Antonino Church to improve postal and telegraph services, it was designed by engineer G. Lombardo, constructed in 1931, and opened on October 29, 1934. It is a three-storey building, with frescoes by Gino Morici and architecture that reflect the Fascist style, with an attic on the upper floor. Acquired by Banca del Nisseno in 2004, it has been carefully restored after decades of disuse and is now the seat of the Superintendence for Cultural and Environmental Heritage, declared a site of historical-artistic value (D.A. nº 6669, June 22, 1999).

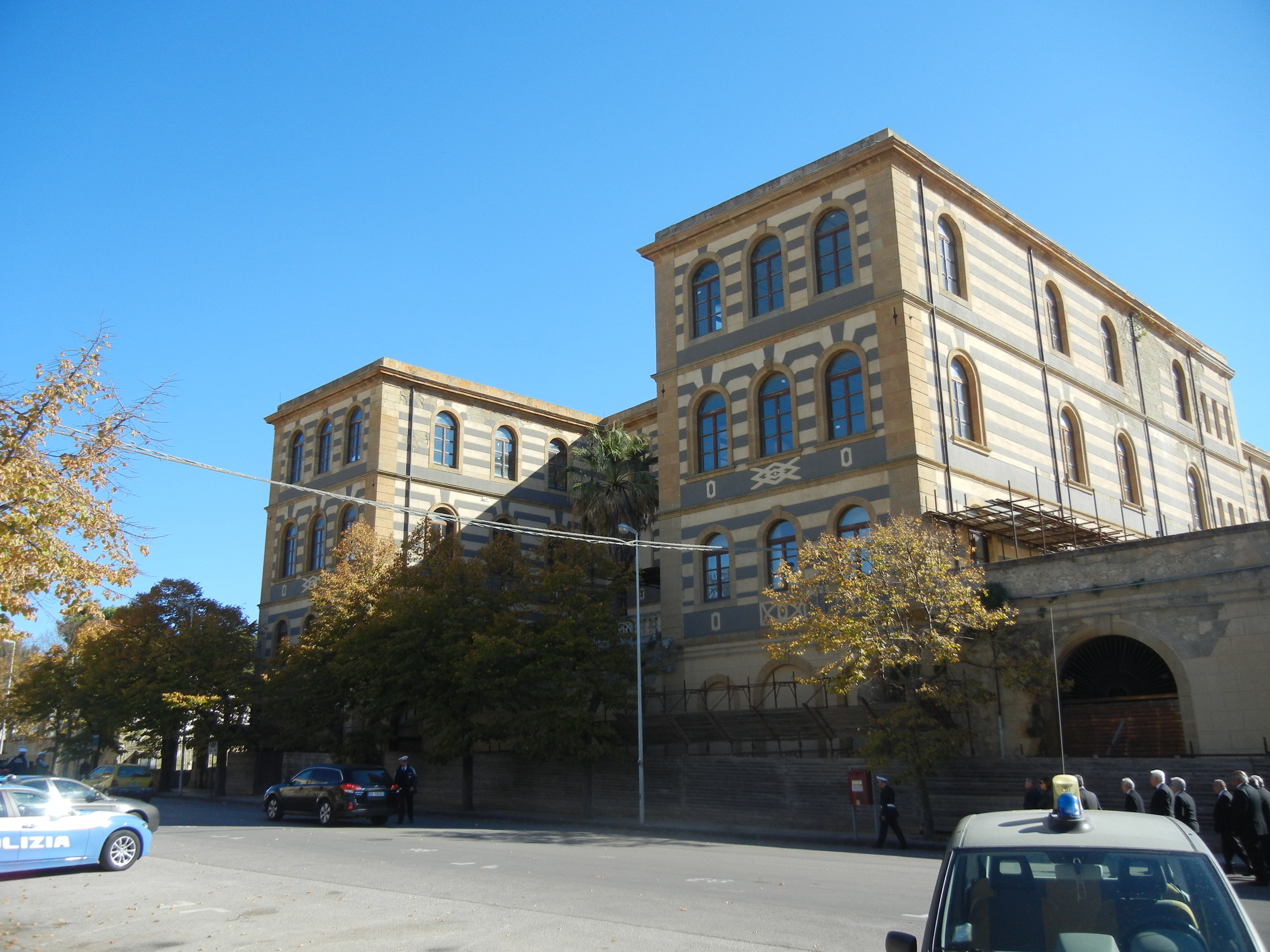
The former Vittorio Emanuele II Hospital

Vittorio Emanuele II Hospital
Built during a violent cholera epidemic in the building of the second Capuchin Monastery, it was the city hospital for over a century, from 1868 to 1979, when it was replaced by the modern Sant'Elia Hospital. It is located in Viale Regina Margherita, next to Villa Amedeo.

Banco di Sicilia Palace
Built around 1920 by Antonio Zanca on the site of the old "Moncada houses" on Corso Umberto I, it was among Caltanissetta's first reinforced concrete structures. In neoclassical style with local stone elements, it features a courtyard with a polychrome glass skylight.

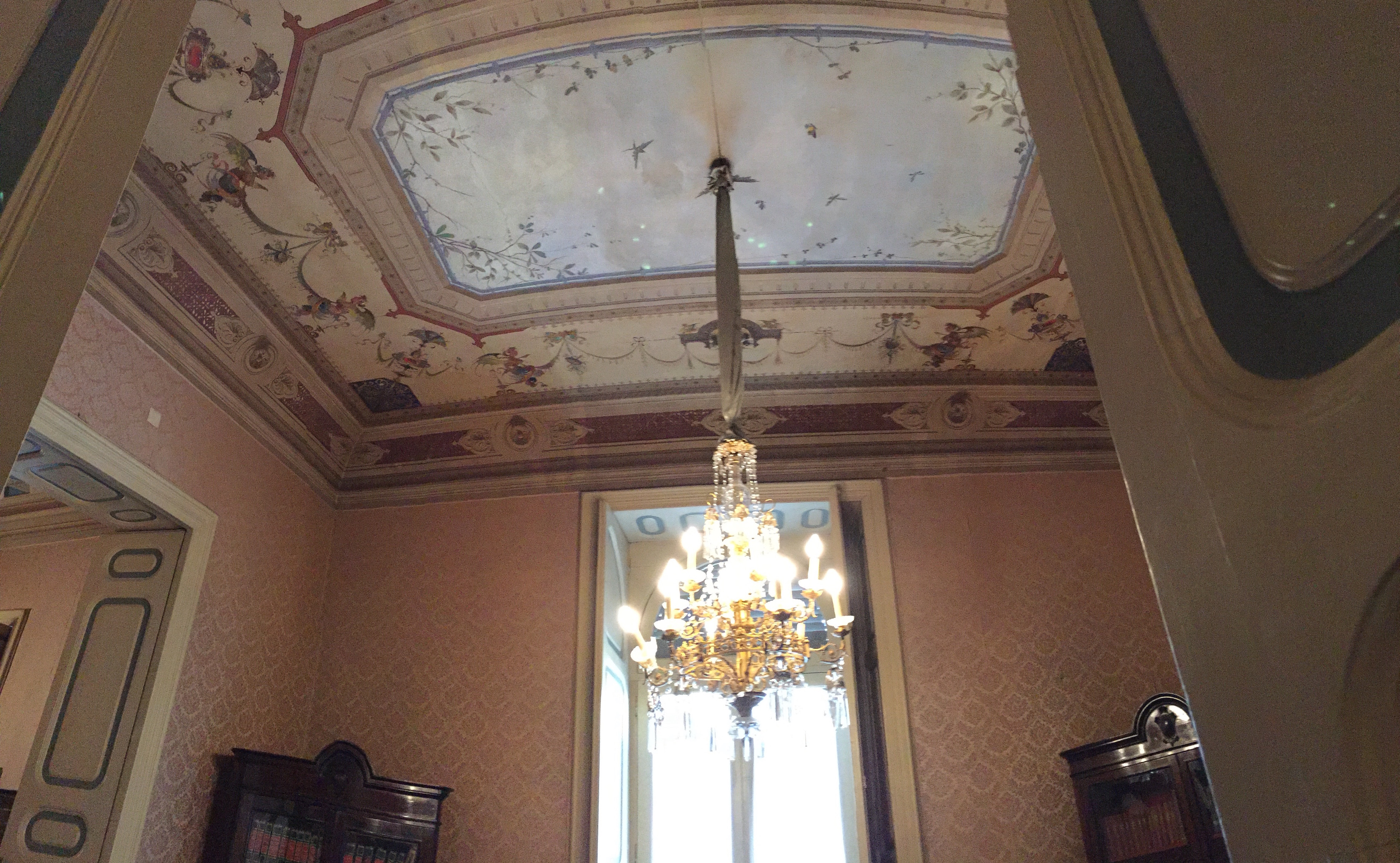
Eclectic frescoed ceilings of Palazzo Testasecca

Palazzo Testasecca
Built in the 19th century in neoclassical style by the family of Count Ignazio Testasecca. It is located in Corso Vittorio Emanuele, in front of Palazzo Benintende. Inside, the main floor is frescoed in an eclectic style.

Palazzo Benintende
Designed by Giuseppe Di Bartolo, it showcases layered architectural orders: Ionic columns on the noble floor, Doric on the second, enhanced by medallions and pilasters. Giuseppe Garibaldi stayed here in 1862. It is located in Corso Vittorio Emanuele.

Villa Mazzone
Also known as Hotel Mazzone, it is located between Via Francesco Crispi and Via Napoleone Colajanni and has a small, well-kept garden. It was built at the end of the nineteenth century to a design by Sebastiano Mottura to accommodate workers on the railroad, but at the beginning of the twentieth century it was enlarged and transformed into the Grand Hotel Concordia, which, after a few decades of fame, was finally closed in the seventies, overwhelmed by the economic crisis. Since the nineties it has been a retirement home.

Palazzo Tumminelli-Paternò
A single-story 18th-century building formed by the consolidation of earlier units, it features exposed stone sides, carved stone balcony supports, and Spanish-style wrought-iron railings.

=== Other ===
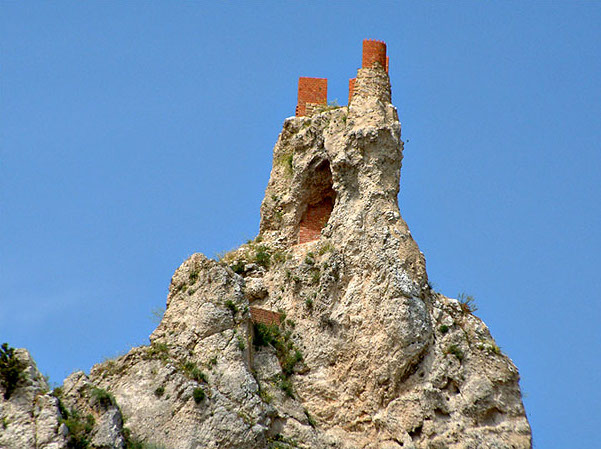
Ruins of Pietrarossa Castle

Pietrarossa Castle
Located on a hill near Caltanissetta, it is thought to date back to the 9th century, built over earlier Sicanian sites. A medieval stronghold, it housed the tomb of Queen Adelasia (granddaughter of Roger I of Sicily) until the late 11th century and hosted a Sicilian baronial parliament in 1378 to appoint the four vicars who governed Sicily. An earthquake in 1567 left only two towers visible today. At the base is the Angeli Monumental Cemetery.

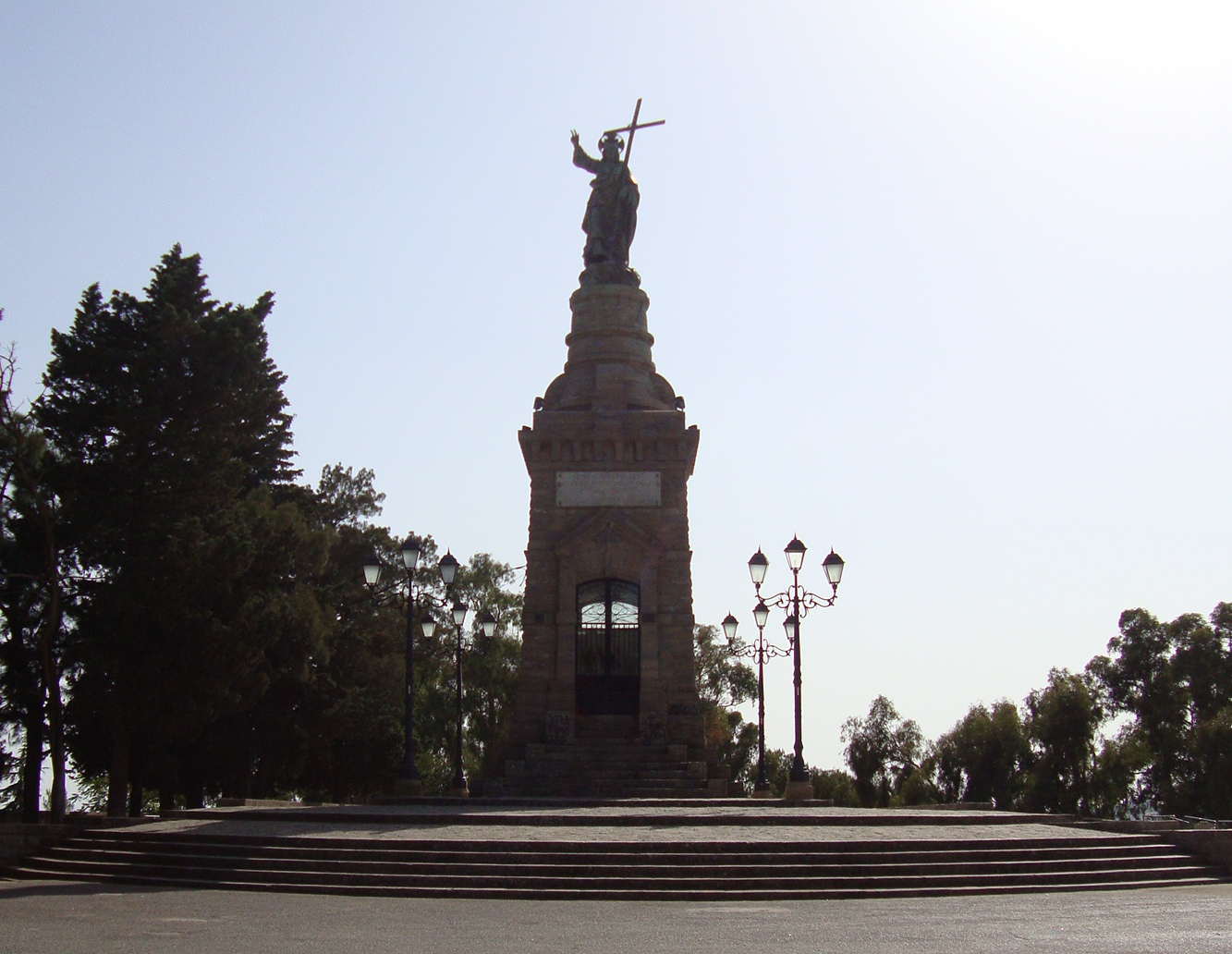
Monument to the Redeemer

Monument to the Redeemer
Erected for the 1900 Jubilee on Mount San Giuliano in the geographic center of Sicily, it is one of Italy's regional monuments to the Redeemer. Designed by Ernesto Basile, it has a stone base with an interior chapel and a bronze statue of Christ inspired by a marble figure in the Basilica of St. John Lateran in Rome. Its devotion is linked to the "Feast of the Redeemer" on August 6.

Piazza Garibaldi
The main square of the historic center, where Corso Umberto I and Corso Vittorio Emanuele intersect, is framed by the Town Hall, the Cathedral and the Church of San Sebastiano, with the "Triton Fountain" in the center.

Between late 2008 and early 2009, the entire Piazza Garibaldi underwent repaving to replace the old asphalt surface with more aesthetically pleasing lava stone paving. This was part of an urban redevelopment project for the historic center called "La Grande Piazza." The work created a large pedestrian area, slightly raised above street level and isolated from vehicular traffic. Historically, before the unification of Italy, the square was named Piazza Ferdinando in honor of King Ferdinand II of Bourbon.

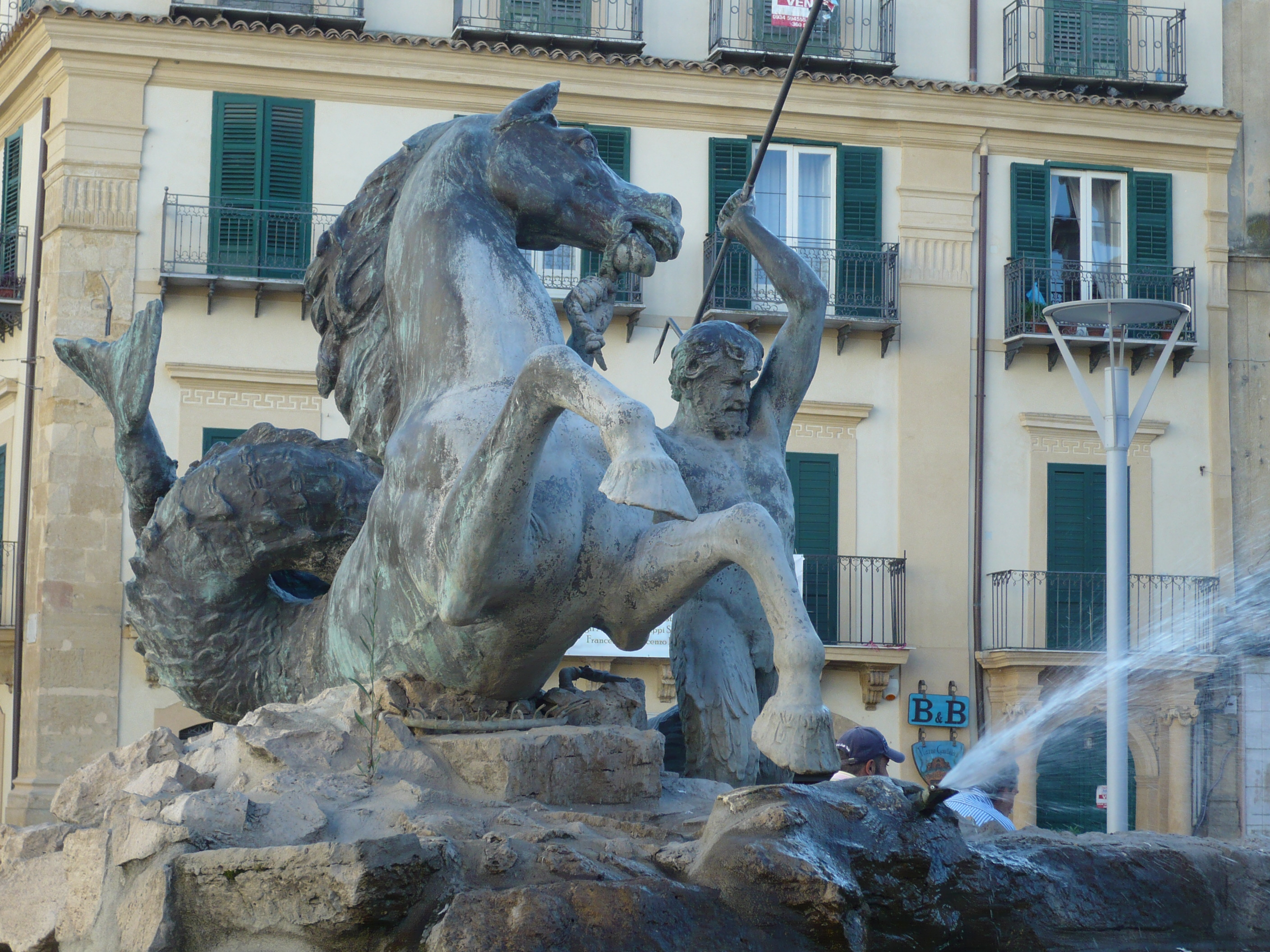
Detail of the Triton Fountain

Triton Fountain
A bronze group representing a Triton subduing a seahorse between two menacing sea monsters, inspired by the Triton of Greek mythology, son of Poseidon and Amphitrite. Sculpted by the local artist Michele Tripisciano in 1890, it was first placed in the atrium of Palazzo del Carmine. Designed by Gaetano Averna, it was moved to the center of Piazza Garibaldi, where it was unveiled on December 15, 1956, replacing an iron lamp-post with five lights. Between late 2008 and early 2009, the square was repaved with lava stone to bar vehicles, and the fountain was restored with lighting, reviving its grandeur. Often stylized, it is a symbol of the city.

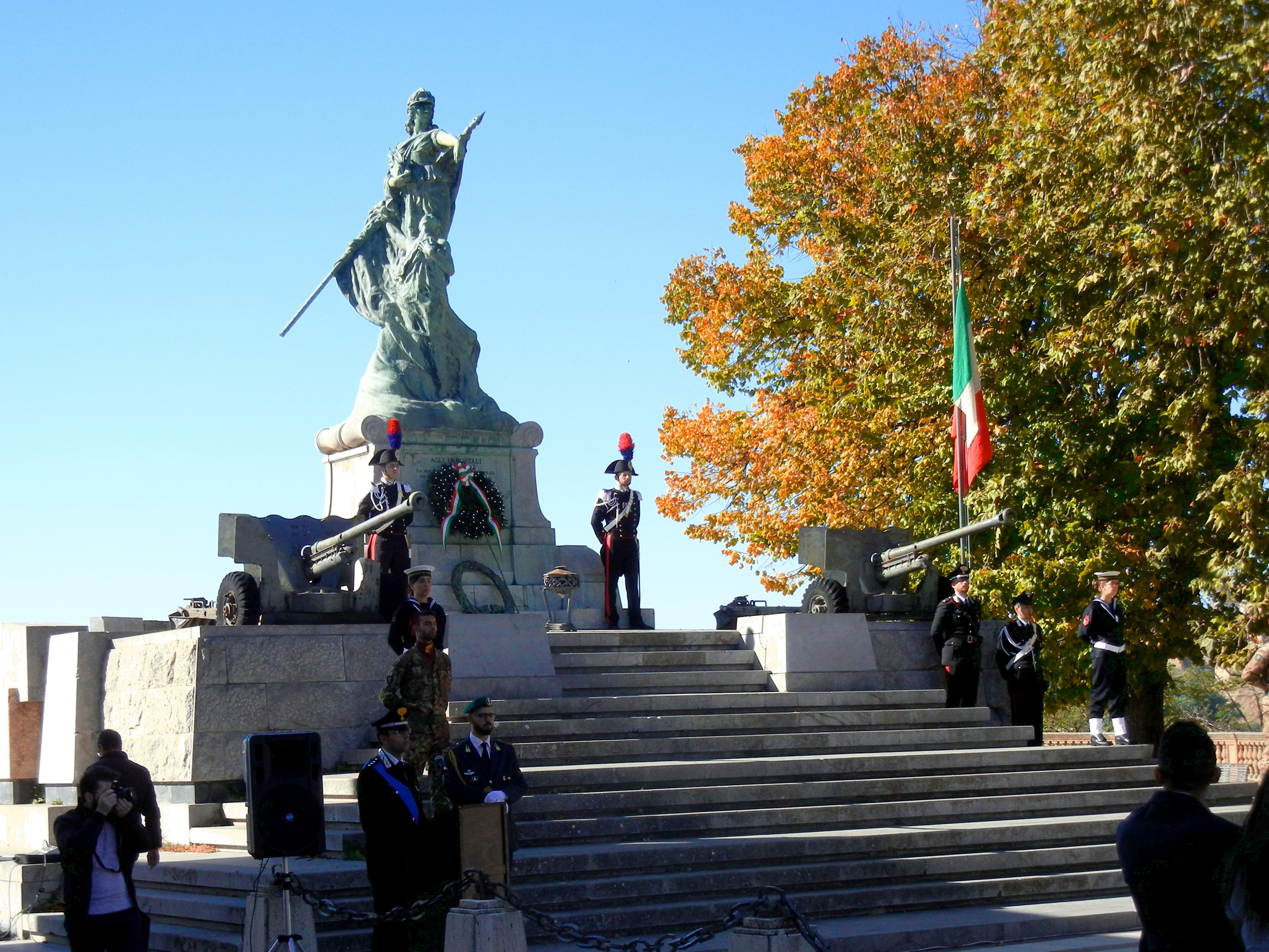
Memorial to the fallen on November 4, 2017

Monument to the Fallen
At the end of Viale Regina Margherita, it honors the 291 soldiers from Caltanissetta who died in the Great War. A bronze statue represents the upright fatherland, holding a helmet with laurel and oak, a book and a palm, gesturing to the hero below, clutching the tricolor flag. On a stepped base with two cannons and a bronze laurel crown, it was unveiled on December 16, 1922, by a committee led by Dr. Luigi Sagona, who had lost relatives in the war. First placed near the seminary in "Viale delle Rimembranze", in 1965 it was moved 500 meters to its current location. It was sculpted by Cosimo Sorgi with bronze from the Laganà foundry, and hosts the November 4 commemorations.

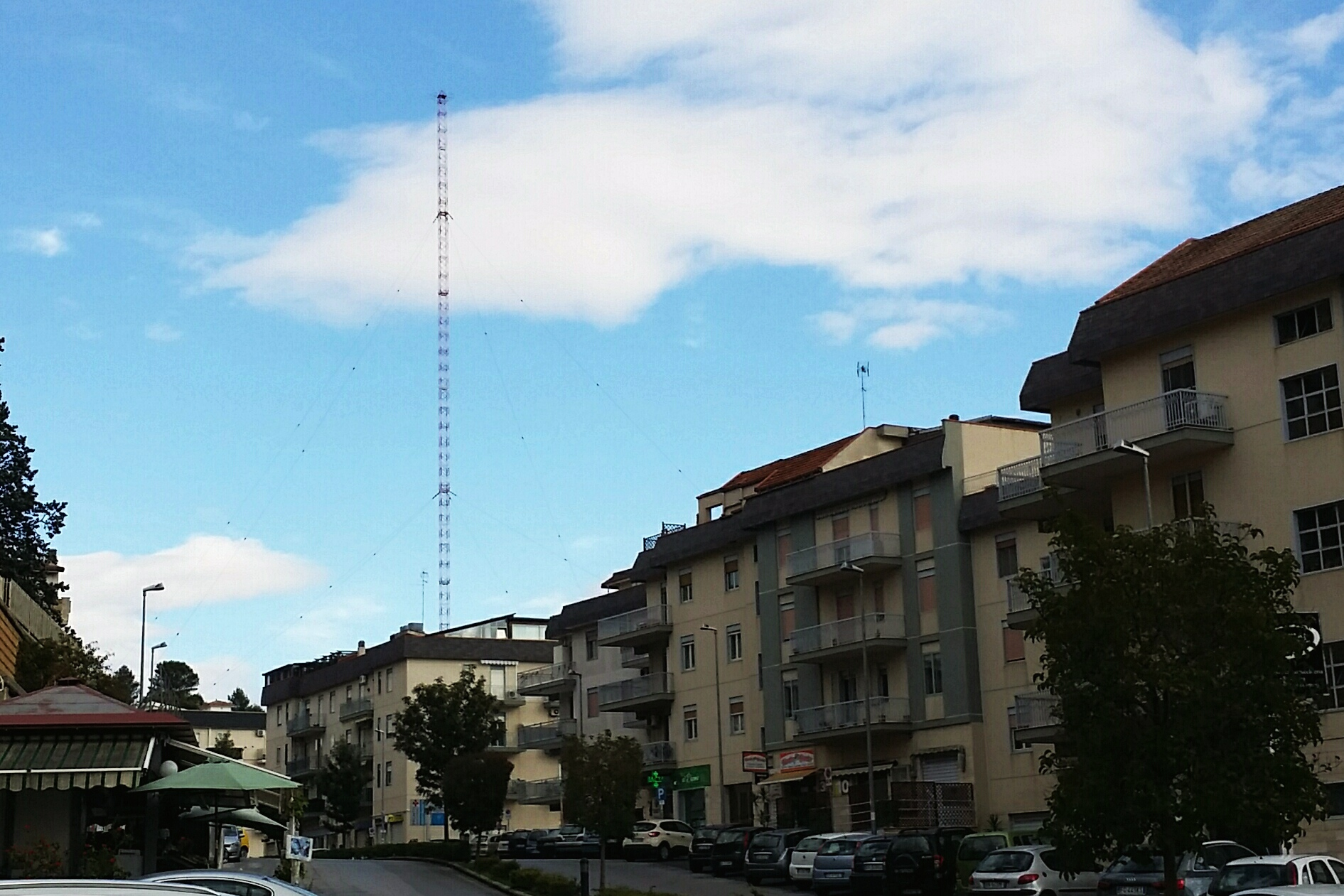
The Caltanissetta Rai antenna from Via F. Paladini

Caltanissetta Transmitter Station
This radio transmitting station for longwave, mediumwave, and shortwave broadcasting featured a 286-meter (938-foot) omnidirectional antenna, till 2025 Italy's tallest structure, on Sant’Anna hill at 660 meters (2,165 feet) above sea level. On November 2, 2013, the city council bought the antenna, its buildings, and surrounding land for €537,000 to prevent RAI's demolition and convert the wooded area into a public park. On November 23, 2021, Sicily's Department of Cultural Heritage instructed the Superintendence of Caltanissetta to seek cultural heritage status for the antenna, which is locally valued for its historical and cultural significance.

On May 28, 2025, the Department of Cultural Heritage and Sicilian Identity revoked the protection constraint imposed on the transmitter on the LF-AM-HF frequencies, highlighting serious structural issues that would have prevented the implementation of extraordinary maintenance and could have posed a risk to public safety.

On July 18, 2025, the Regional Administrative Court for Sicily authorized the demolition of the structure, recognizing the structural issues.[50] And the antenna was demolished on Wednesday 23rd at 5:40 pm by Rai Way.

Capodarso bridge
Located on the Imera Meridionale, on the border between the territories of Caltanissetta and Enna, it was built in 1553 at the behest of Charles V; in the 18th century the scholar Antonio Chiusole included it among the three wonders of Sicily ("a mountain, a bridge and a fountain"). Originally it had the appearance of a humpback bridge, but during the 19th century it underwent radical changes to facilitate the passage of wagons, which gave it its current shape. Today it is located along the S.S. 122 Agrigentina, inside the Natural Reserve of Monte Capodarso and Valle dell'Imera Meridionale.

=== Public gardens ===
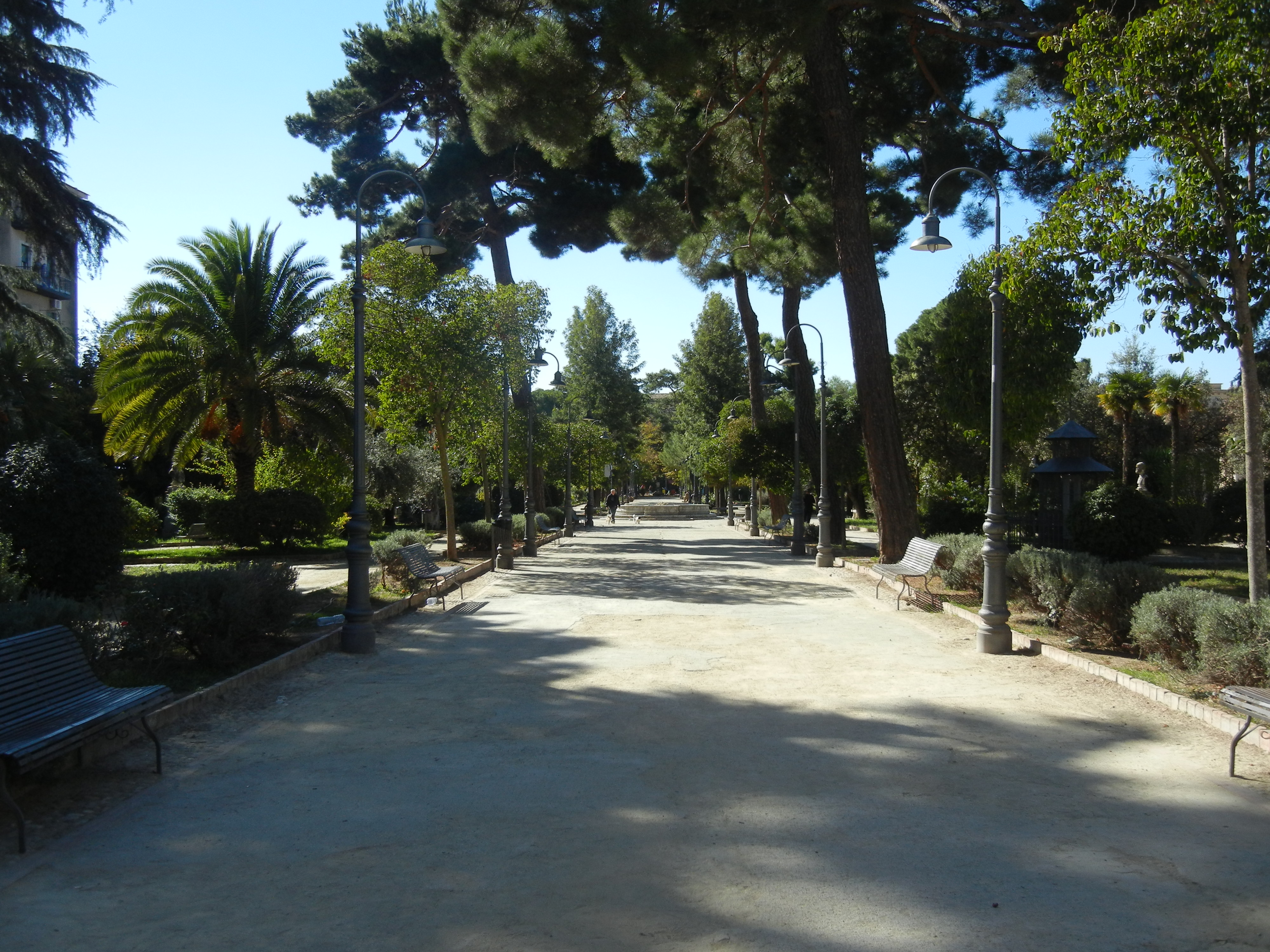
Avenue in Villa Amedeo

The city has three municipal gardens ("villas"):

- Villa Amedeo, the largest, on Viale Regina Margherita,
- Villa Cordova, on Viale Conte Testasecca,
- Villa Monica, on Via Filippo Turati.

Additional green spaces include:

- Dubini Park, on Viale Luigi Monaco,
- Garden of Legality, on Viale Stefano Candura,
- Robinson Park, on Via De Amicis.

Smaller green areas exist in Piazza della Repubblica, Piazza Giovanni XXIII, Piazza Falcone e Borsellino, between Via Catania and Via Galilei, Via Niscemi, Piazza Iacono, and on Mount San Giuliano. Despite this, in 2018, usable public green space was just 4.5 m^{2} per inhabitant, ranking Caltanissetta near the bottom nationally.

Two larger, undeveloped green areas awaiting funding are:

- Balate Urban Park, between Via Rochester and the Balate-Pinzelli district,
- Sant’Anna Park, at the decommissioned RAI antenna site.

== Archaeological sites ==
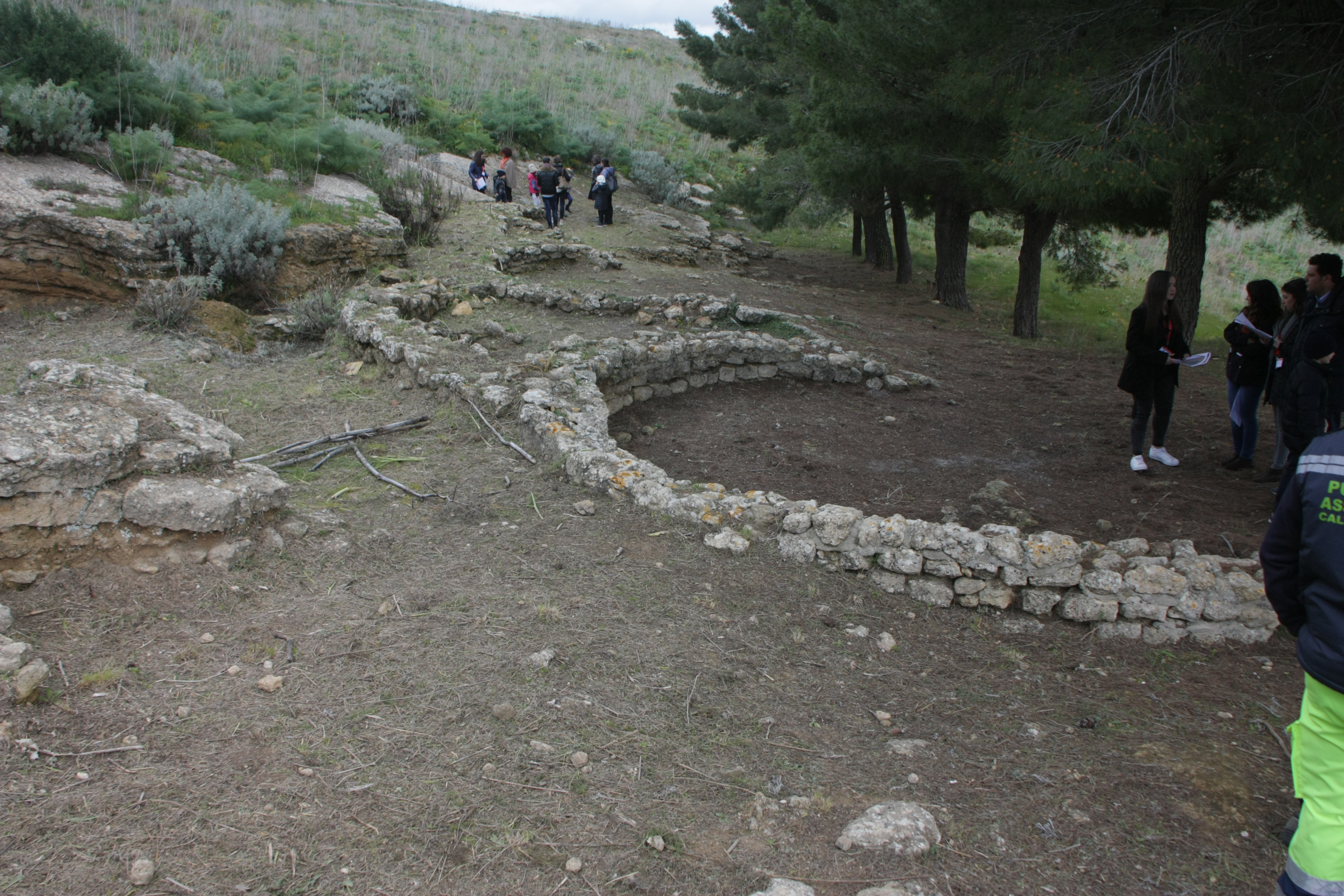
Circular huts within the Sabucina Regional Archaeological Park

Within the urban perimeter of the city of Caltanissetta lies the Palmintelli Archaeological Park.

The primary archaeological parks located outside the city center include:

- The archaeological excavations of Sabucina
- The archaeological excavations of Gibil Gabib

Palmintelli
The Palmintelli Archaeological Park is situated in a central area of the city, adjacent to the Viale della Regione. The site was uncovered following excavations conducted in 1988. Originally, the area now occupied by the park housed a funerary complex of rock-cut tombs dating back to the Bronze Age, of which only one remains intact. The rectangular entrance to this tomb, featuring a regular layout and a flat ceiling, is clearly visible. Several archaeological artifacts were discovered within it, some of which are preserved at the Caltanissetta Archaeological Museum.

Sabucina
Located east of the city, Sabucina's discovery is relatively recent, with the first excavations beginning in the 1960s. The site reveals settlements spanning from the Early Bronze Age (20th–16th centuries BCE) through the period of Hellenization, up to the Roman period. An iconographic antiquarium preserves artifacts unearthed in the area.

Gibil Gabib
Situated approximately five kilometers from the capital, this site occupies a hill overlooking the southeastern slope of the Salso valley. Comprising three platforms descending southeastward, it hosted indigenous prehistoric and Greek-era settlements. Excavations began in the mid-19th century and resumed with greater intensity in the 1950s, led by Dinu Adameșteanu. The most recent excavations occurred in 1984. Around the mid-20th century, structures from the 6th century BCE were unearthed, along with sections of the defensive wall and ceramic objects linked to the Castelluccio facies of the Late Bronze Age. In the 1980s, a significant defensive tower from the mid-6th century BCE was excavated, a discovery that clarified the purpose of the defensive walls found nearly three decades earlier.
Excavations of the structures yielded vases, everyday objects, plates, and oil lamps. Additionally, a terracotta statue of a female deity and a votive terracotta head were found, attesting to the presence of various spaces dedicated to worship and veneration within the settlement. At the base of the hill stretched two necropolises, from which grave goods featuring red-figure pottery of Siceliot origin were recovered.

== Industrial archaeology ==
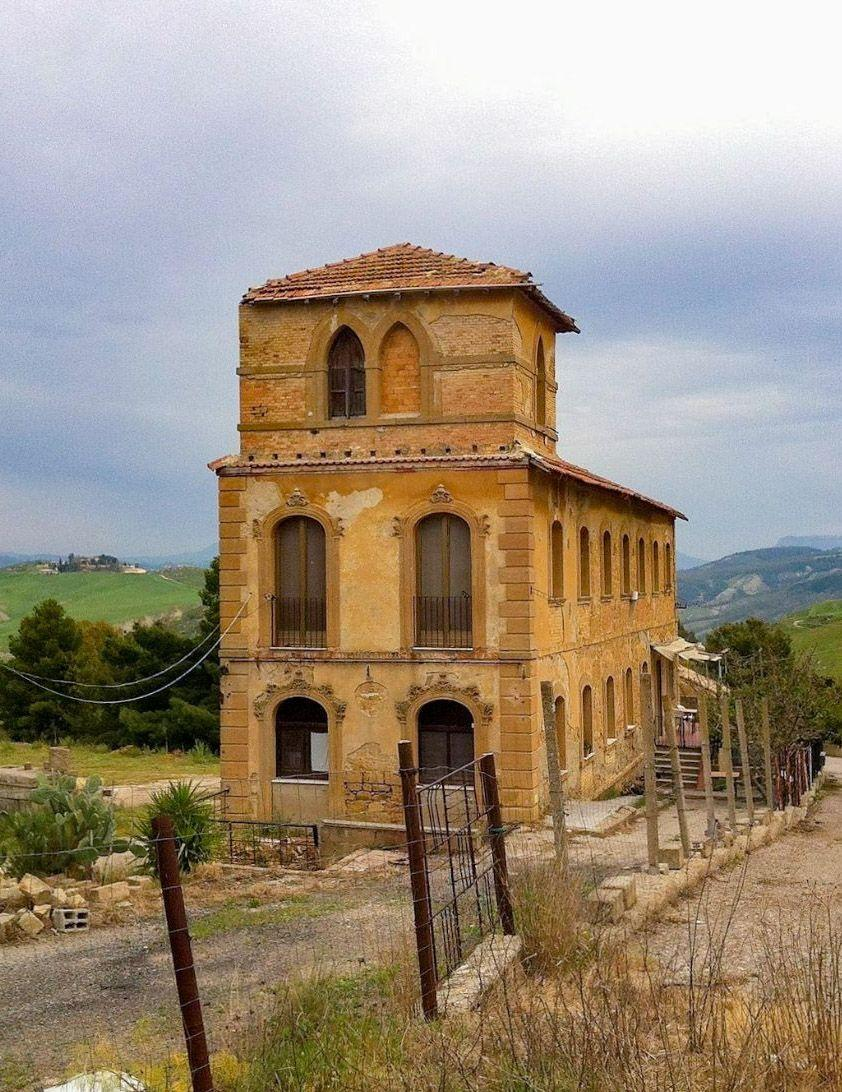
Building of the Trabonella sulfur mine

Sulfur mines
Caltanissetta's past is deeply intertwined with sulfur extraction and the mining industry, as evidenced by the numerous now-inactive sulfur mines ("solfare") scattered across the territory, leaving behind abandoned structures. Notable examples include the Gessolungo, Giumentaro, Iungio Tumminelli, Saponaro, Stretto Giordano, and Trabonella mines.

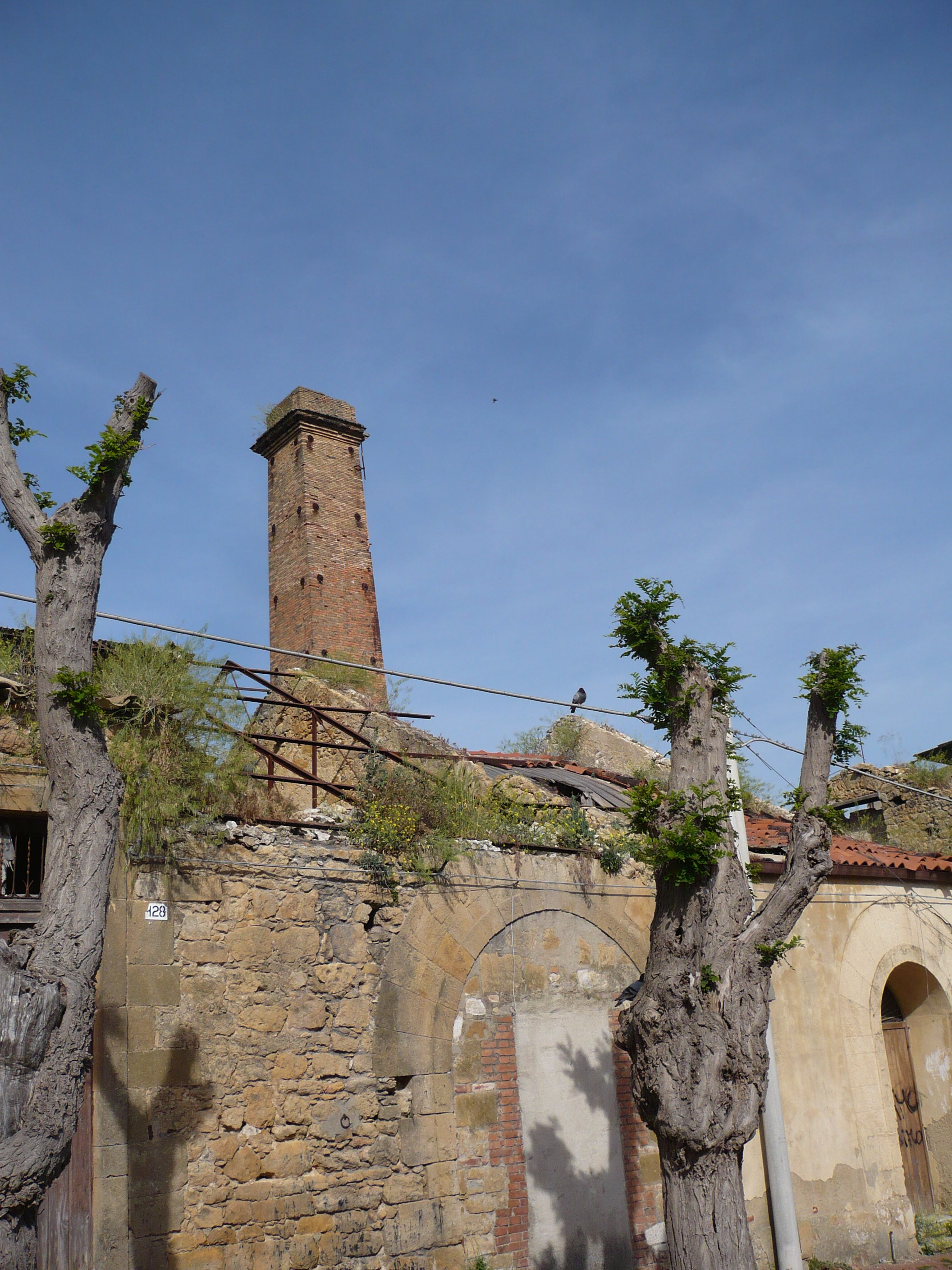
Ruins of the gasometer or Power plant factory, in Via Angeli

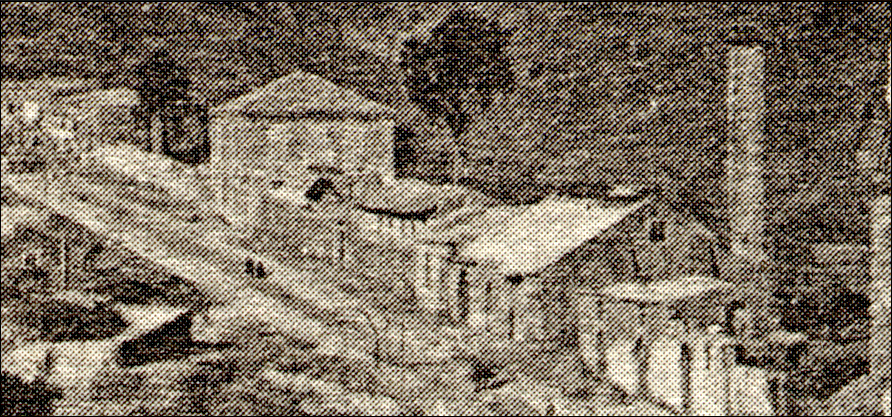
The gasometer or Power plant factory in a photo from the end of the 19th century

Gasometer of the Angels or Power plant factory
A rare example of industrial archaeology, this gasometer was constructed in 1867 in the southern part of the historic Angeli district, along the road leading to the cemetery and the Church of Santa Maria degli Angeli. It significantly contributed to the city's modernization and was municipalized in 1893. Originally designed to produce gas for public lighting, it later served as the municipal kennel with the advent of electricity until the 1950s, and subsequently housed four historic funeral carriages, which were later relocated for safekeeping. Today, the structure lies in a severe state of neglect, despite being declared a structure of "particularly significant ethno-anthropological interest" by a decree from the Regional Councillor for Cultural Heritage.

Mulino Salvati
The first steam mill in the city, it was established in 1866 by brothers Francesco and Luigi Salvati from Campania, in an area then outside the city walls at the intersection of present-day Via Salvati and Via Sallemi. The building complex straddled both banks of a torrential stream, a tributary of the Grazie torrent, near a fountain and a water trough that no longer exist. It ceased operations in 1913.

== Urban planning ==
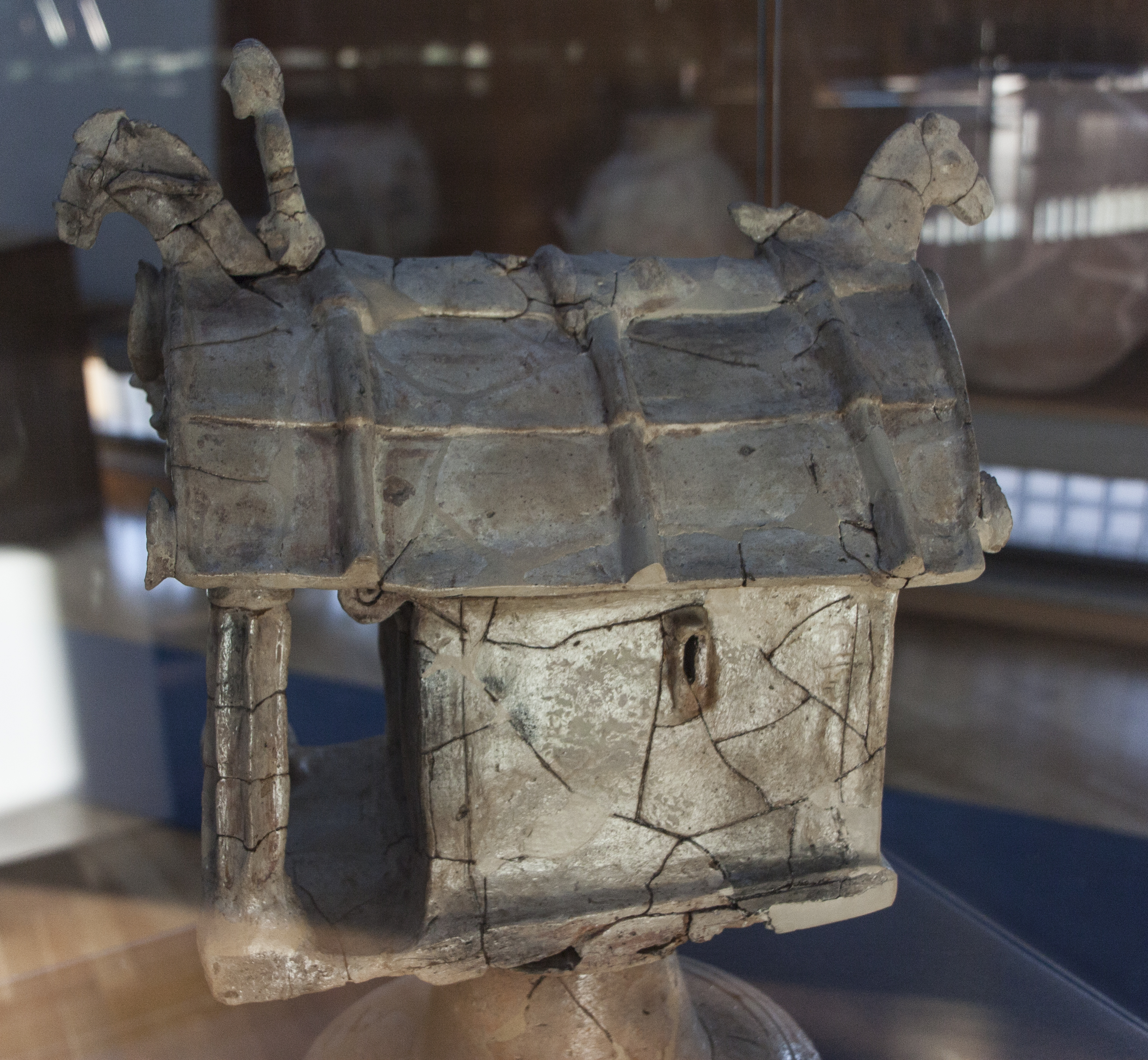
The Sabucina shrine, a small replica of a Greek temple from the urban settlement of the same name in the 6th century BC.

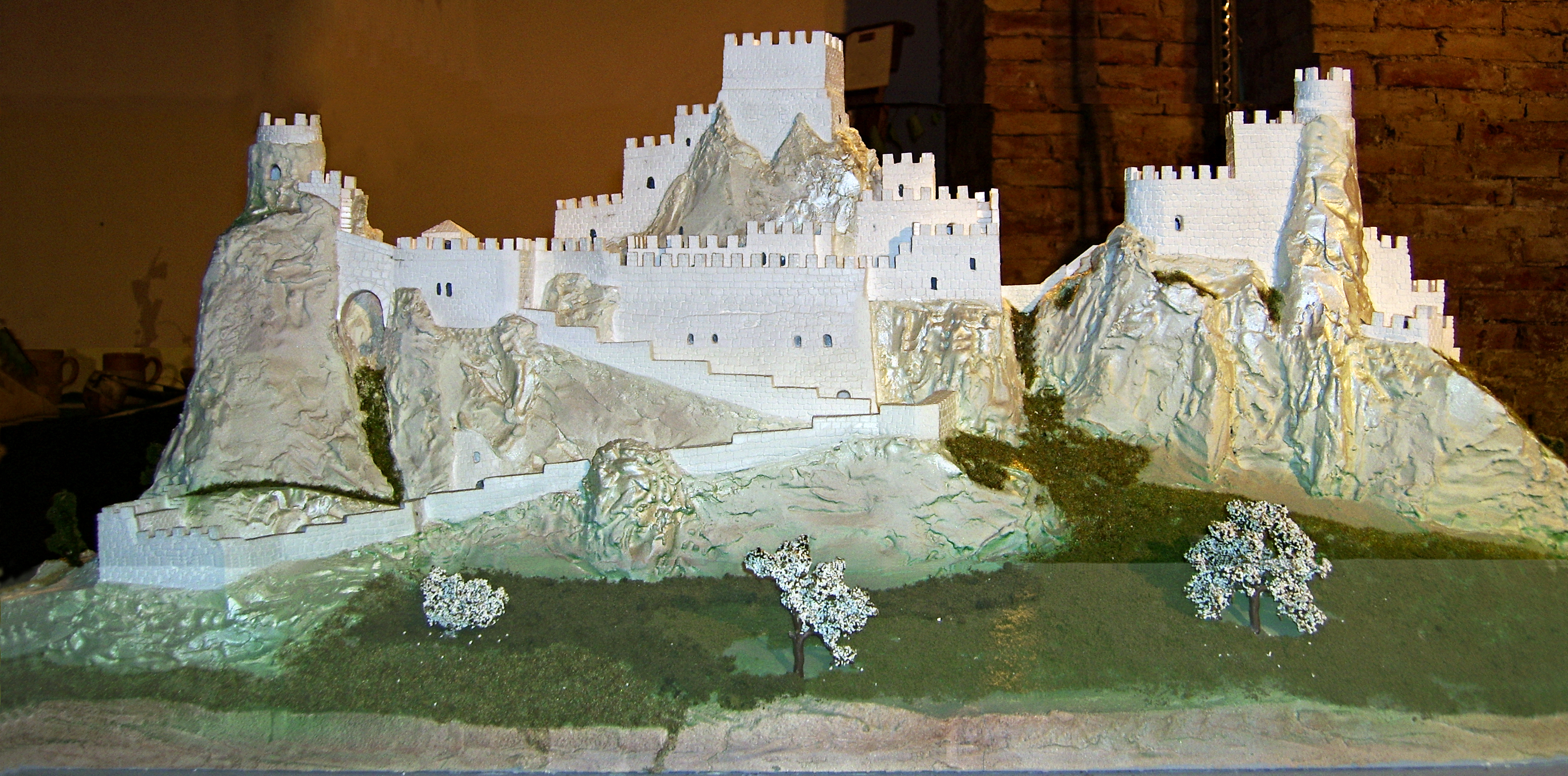
Model of the Pietrarossa Castle preserved in Seville.

The earliest urban nucleus of Caltanissetta is the Sicanian village of Sabucina, dating to the 12th century BC, located about four kilometers from the current city. Other significant urban centers included Gibil Gabib, Vassallaggi, and Capodarso, all of which, along with Sabucina, fell under Siceliot influence. Artifacts found in the Lannari district (now housed in the Archaeological Museum of Caltanissetta) indicate that during the Roman period, the urban settlement shifted to the valley below Mount Sabucina.

The ancient village, possibly of Byzantine origin, emerged around the Pietrarossa Castle (the ancient Qalʿat an-nisāʾ, "Castle of the Women"), developing organically along the slope without formal planning, offering a strategic view of the Imera Meridionale valley. Built on high cliffs and fortified by sturdy walls—demolished in the 17th century—it was protected by the nearly impregnable castle. The subsequent Arab village corresponds to the present-day San Francesco district (commonly, though inaccurately, known as "Angeli"), where triangular courtyards typical of Arab urban planning remain visible among the alleys and narrow streets.

With the arrival of the Normans, the Santo Spirito Abbey was expanded, becoming the city's parish church. Preexisting since the 8th century, it was accompanied by a nearby Roman-era rock-hewn hamlet used as a granary.

During the Swabian period, the city consisted of clustered districts centered around key architectural landmarks: the castle, the abbey, the 15th-century Magistrate's Palace (of which only a tower remains, now integrated into later structures), the new parish of Santa Maria la Vetere (or Santa Maria degli Angeli), and others.

The organic growth of the urban fabric truly began in the 16th century under the rule of the Montcada family, when urban development started to be planned. The city was divided into four districts: San Francesco (encompassing the medieval borough) to the southeast, Santa Venera (named after a convent built by the Montcada, later renamed Santa Flavia) to the north, San Rocco to the northwest, and Zingari (or Provvidenza), the former Jewish ghetto, to the southwest. These districts were separated by four roughly perpendicular roads: Via dei Fondachi and its extension Via del Monastero di Santa Croce, opened in 1827 (now Corso Vittorio Emanuele) running east–west, and Via del Collegio (now Corso Umberto I) running north–south. These intersected at a central square, Piazza Grande, renamed Piazza Ferdinandea in 1828 after a statue with a pedestal of Ferdinand I of the Two Sicilies, sculpted by neoclassical artist Valerio Villareale, was erected there. The statue was toppled during the 1848 uprisings, and after the Unification of Italy, the square was renamed Piazza Garibaldi in honor of the hero of the two worlds, who arrived in the city in 1860 with his "Thousand".

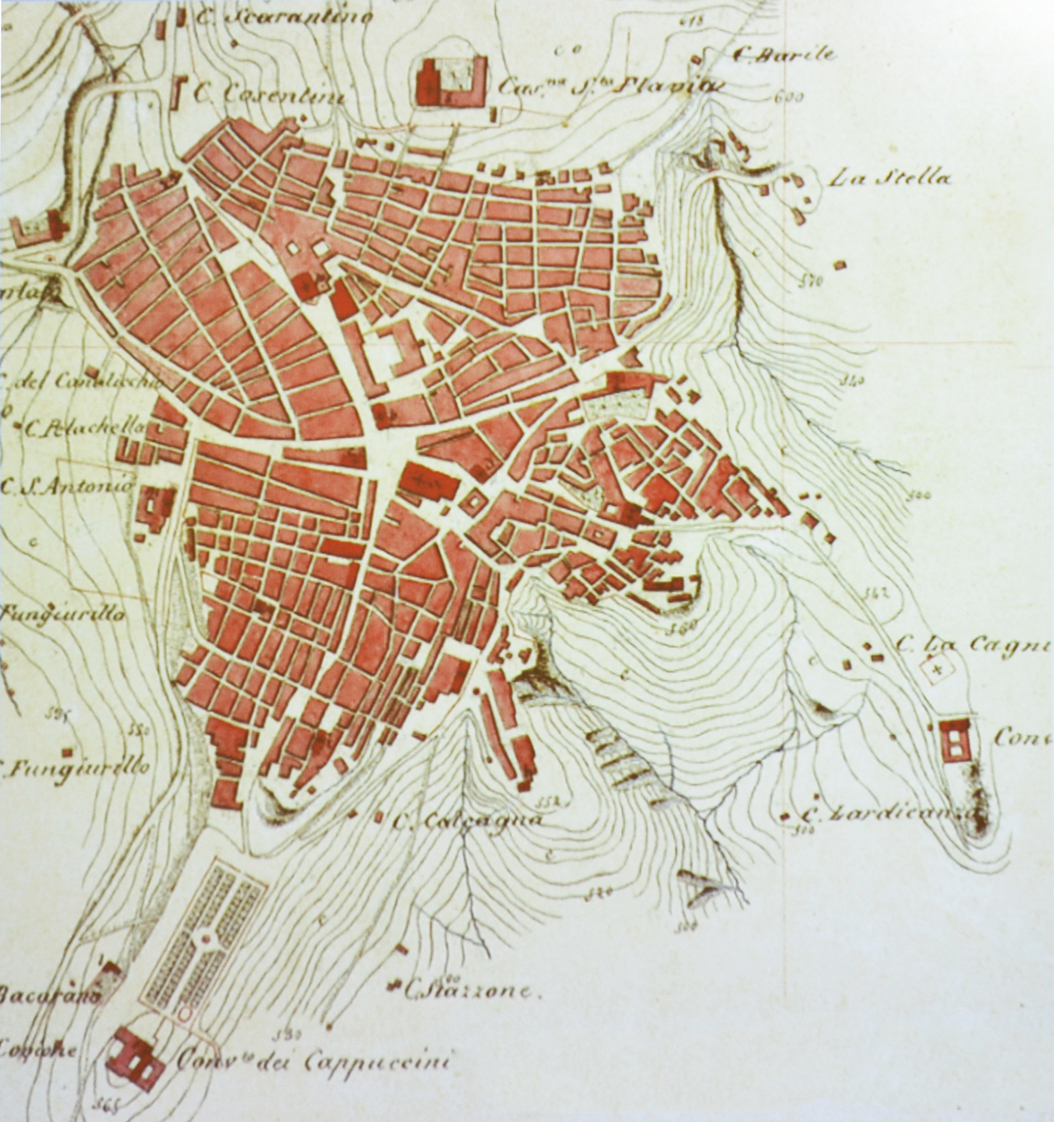
Old map of Caltanissetta from early 1864.

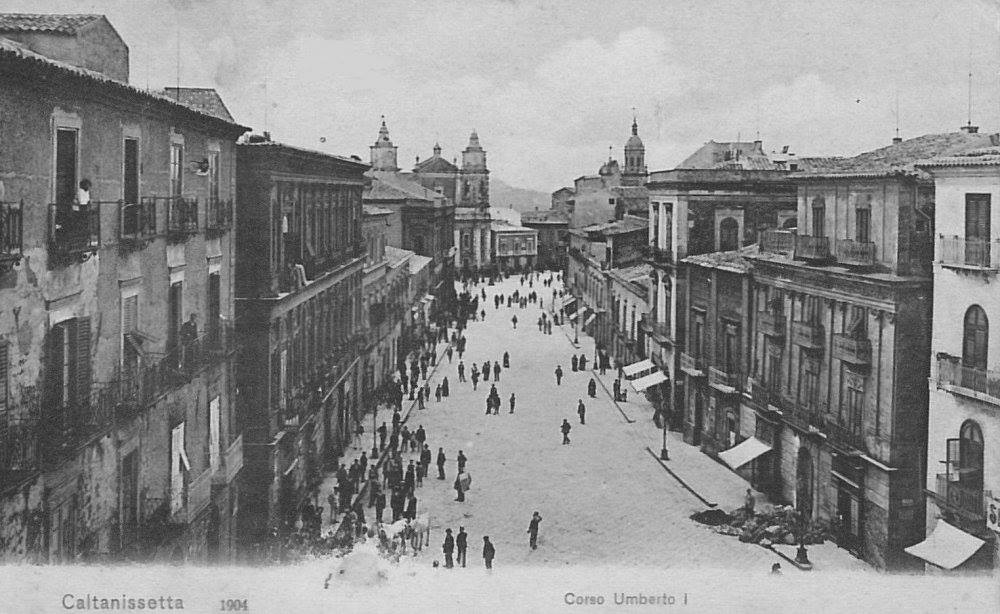
Corso Umberto I in 1904: on the left, the "Moncada houses," former residences of the noble family of the same name, are still visible; they were demolished three years later to widen Salita Tribunali (now Via Matteotti) and build the Banco di Sicilia and Banca d’Italia palaces.

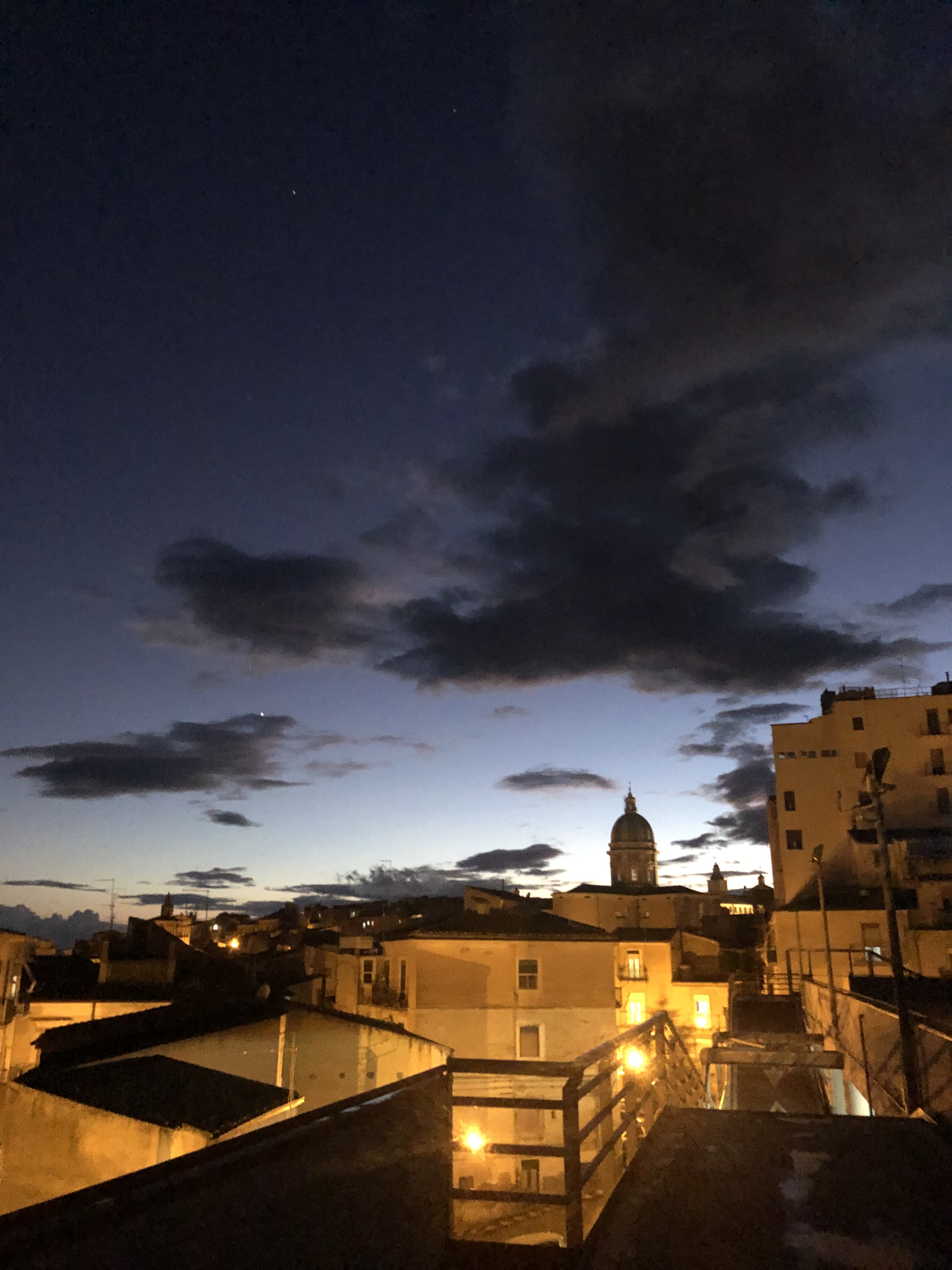
Nighttime view featuring the Caltanissetta Cathedral.

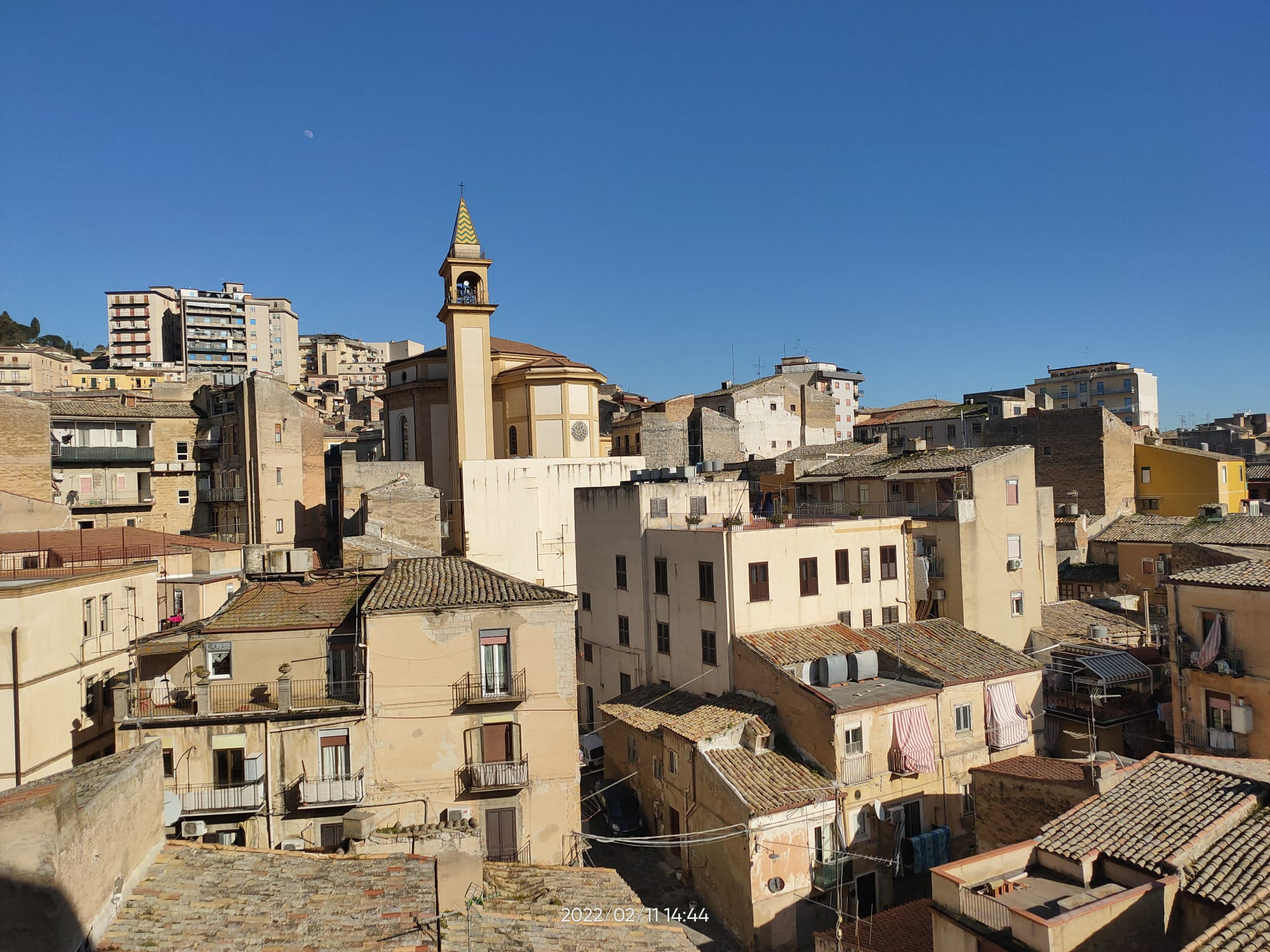
Rooftops of the historic center, with a view of the rear of the Santa Lucia Church.

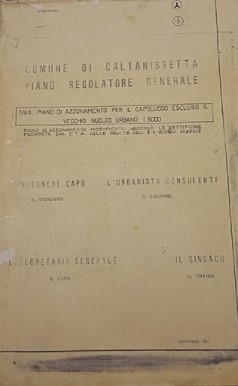
Cover of the 1962-approved PRG by architect Giordano.

The city center weaves through narrow lanes, steep inclines, staircases, and craggy streets, yet it also boasts the grand and elegant Viale Regina Margherita, modeled after French boulevards. This avenue recalls the prosperity the city enjoyed during the sulfur extraction boom of the late 19th century, which saw the construction of opulent residences for wealthy sulfur entrepreneurs along the two main thoroughfares—such as the Testasecca Palace, Benintende Palace, Lanzirotti Palace, Sillitti Bordonaro Palace, and others—as well as significant institutional buildings like the Provincial Palace, the Episcopal Seminary, and the Banco di Sicilia and Banca d’Italia Palaces (the latter demolished in the late 1960s to make way for a new reinforced concrete structure, now closed). During the Fascist era, additional public buildings were erected: the Dubini Sanatorium (now abandoned), designed by architect Salvatore Cardella, who also created the Casa Littoria (now the Financial Offices Palace, home to the provincial Revenue Agency), and the Provincial Studies Palace (currently the site of the accounting school "Mario Rapisardi"); the renowned Viterbo architect Franco Petrucci designed the Casa del Balilla (later the G.I.L. headquarters and, in the postwar period, the Civic Archaeological Museum until 2006) on Via Cavour; and the eclectic artist Gino Morici constructed the Post Office Palace in Piazza Sant’Antonino (later renamed Piazza Guglielmo Marconi). The historic center retains its role as the city's administrative and economic hub, though the eastward expansion of modern districts has led to some decentralization of administrative offices.

The center is home to the Regina Margherita Theater, the city's other cinemas, the Town Hall, and its main churches, including the Cathedral.

It also hosts the picturesque and historic fruit and vegetable market, known as Strata 'a foglia, which has existed since the 16th century—a vibrant example of how local traditions endure, albeit with challenges. The historic center also features numerous notable monuments: the San Domenico Church, the Church of Sant’Agata (former Jesuit college), the Scarabelli library, and various arches, bridges, terraces, and gardens.

This layout remained intact until the post-World War II period: in the 1950s, nearly the entire population resided within the four districts defined by the intersection of the two main streets, Corso Vittorio Emanuele and Corso Umberto I. With the approval of the 1962 master plan—one of Italy's earliest—it aimed to preserve the historic center, prioritizing development in peripheral areas. Consequently, many historic district, starting with the ancient Arab San Francesco district, began to empty out. Over the past half-century, rapid urbanization has dramatically altered the city's urban structure, absorbing hamlets and villages and encroaching on surrounding countryside, leading to the emergence of new neighborhoods. This shift spurred the development of other key roads such as Viale Trieste, Via Niscemi, and Via Napoleone Colajanni, where numerous apartment buildings for residential and commercial use were constructed.

The first expansion, in the 1950s, urbanized the Palmintelli district west of the center, toward the UNRRA-Casas village (built in 1944 and later integrated into the urban fabric), along the main road to San Cataldo (now Viale della Regione), which today serves as the city's bustling service hub.

Following this initial growth, construction began in the Balate district, just south of Palmintelli, and continued further south toward the Pinzelli district. Here, the pivotal axis is Via Turati, an extension of Via Sallemi. This 2-kilometer artery features two busy roundabouts and serves as the primary link to the southwestern urban area (occupied by the Balate district). The two neighborhoods of Balate and Pinzelli together house around 25,000 residents, and urbanization in this area shows no signs of slowing.

West of Palmintelli, nearing the center of San Cataldo, lies Poggio Sant’Elia (at about 700 meters altitude), an elegant low-density residential quarter hosting, among other facilities, the local hospital and the CEFPAS (Center for Continuing Education and Training of Healthcare Personnel), operational since the 1990s. Today, between Palmintelli and Poggio Sant’Elia, lies the city's main entrance (at the junction with the SS 640), from which major traffic routes branch out toward Canicattì, Agrigento, and the A19 (SS 640), San Cataldo (Via Due Fontane), Santa Caterina Villarmosa (SS 122/bis), and the city itself via the ring road.

Just south of Poggio Sant’Elia is the Due Fontane district, a solely residential low-density area with a strong trend toward further urbanization. Between the late 20th century and early 21st century, rapid development of businesses and shopping centers has occurred along its main road, Via Due Fontane, given its critical connection between Caltanissetta and San Cataldo.

While westward expansion progressed in the Balate district, the San Luca district emerged in the late 1990s to the south. Predominantly composed of housing cooperatives, this densely populated neighborhood (about 5,000 residents) is an example of low quality construction, with densely packed buildings and little green space, despite recent planning. To address this, efforts have been made to redevelop a plot featuring an Enel pylon, transforming it within a few years into the Garden of Legality, dedicated to Mafia victims and inaugurated in May 2017.
From here, the southern periphery expanded with the gradual construction of mostly single-family villas in the Pian Del Lago district, a low-density residential area hosting the city's sports facilities and the CARA, an asylum seeker reception center operational since 1998 and currently one of Italy's largest.

Further south, along the Caltanissetta – Pietraperzia road, is the industrial area, developed at the end of the 1950s, which represents an important manufacturing center.

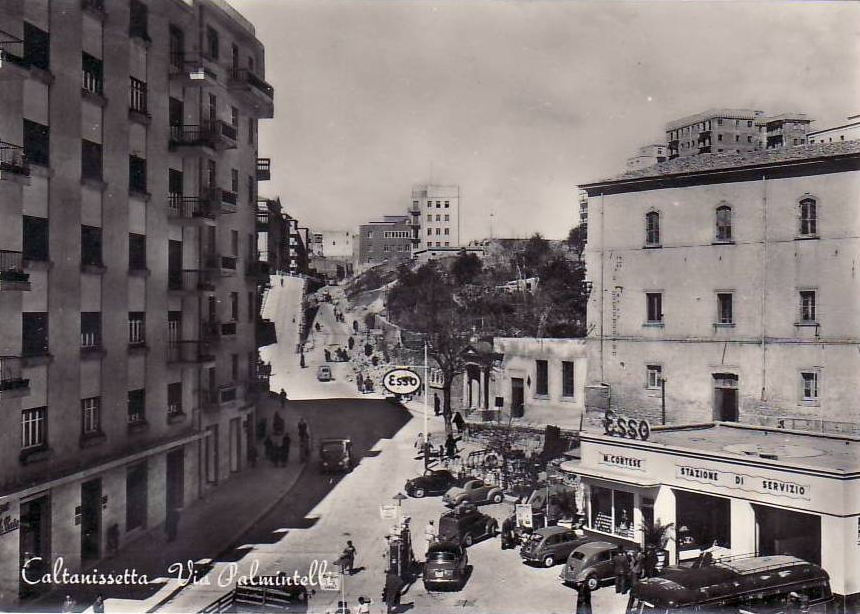
View of Via Palmintelli (now Via R. di San Secondo) during its building boom (1950s).

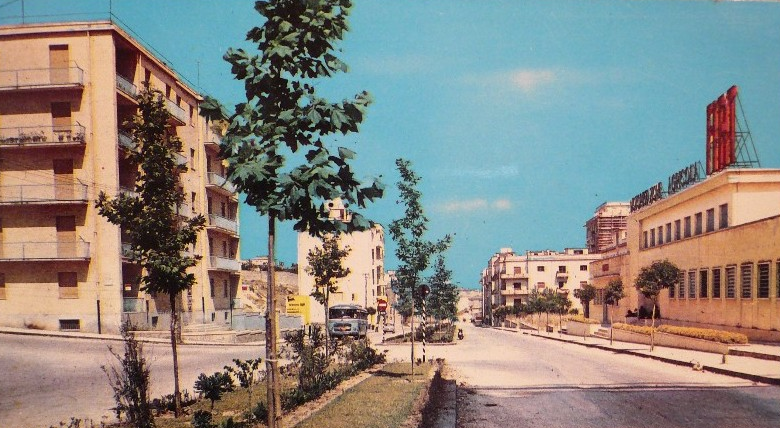
A section of Viale della Regione in the 1960s.

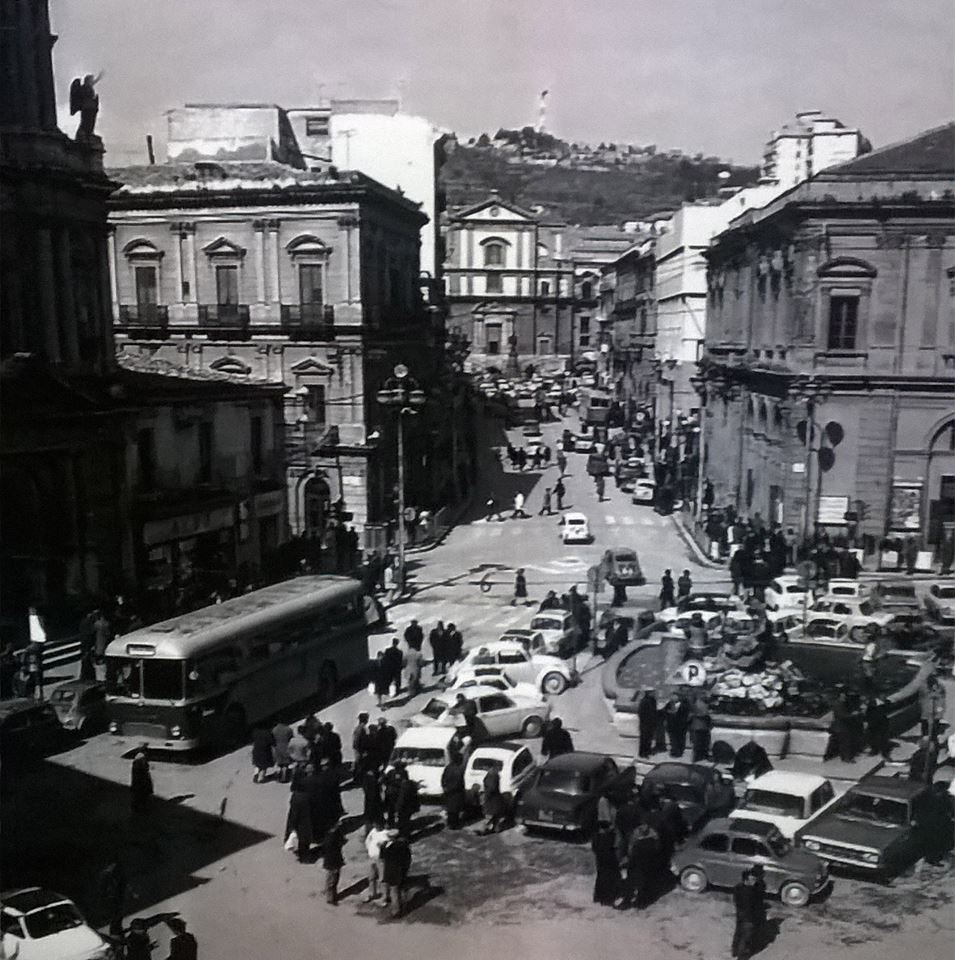
Piazza Garibaldi and Corso Umberto I in the 1970s.

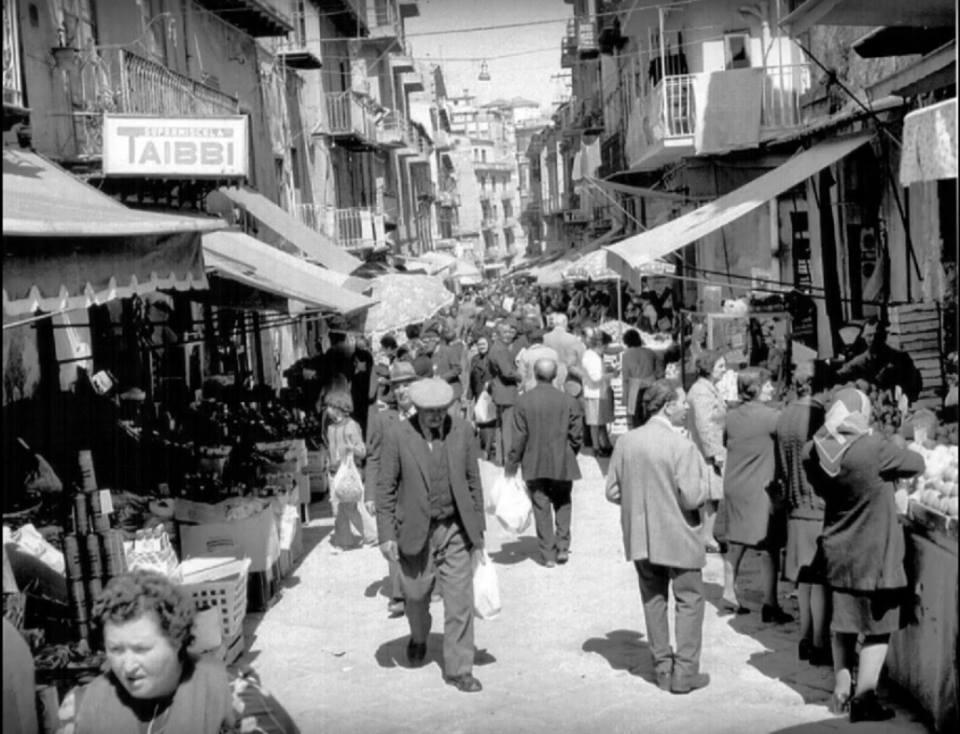
The Strata 'a foglia market in the 1960s.

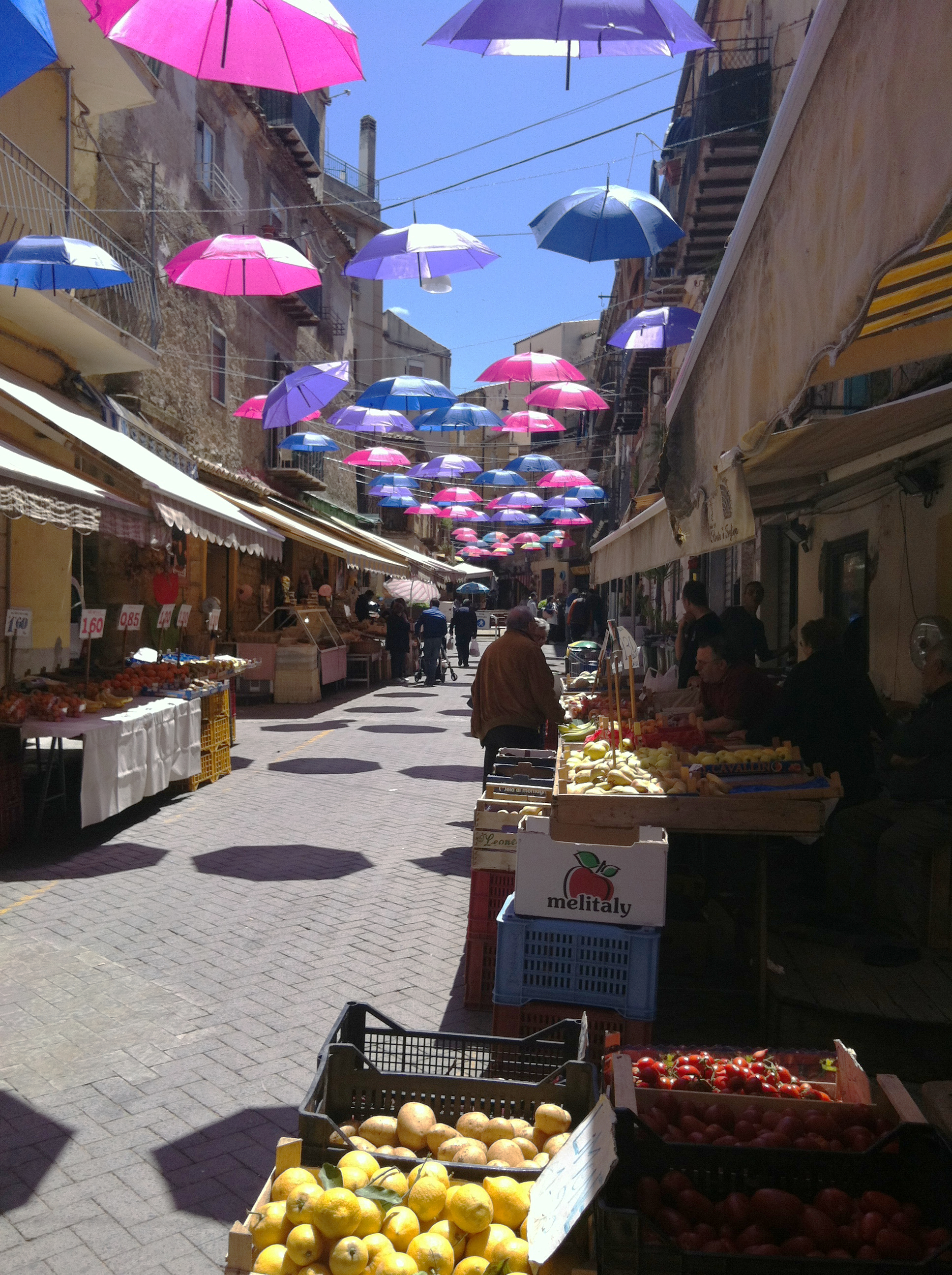
The Strata 'a foglia market today.

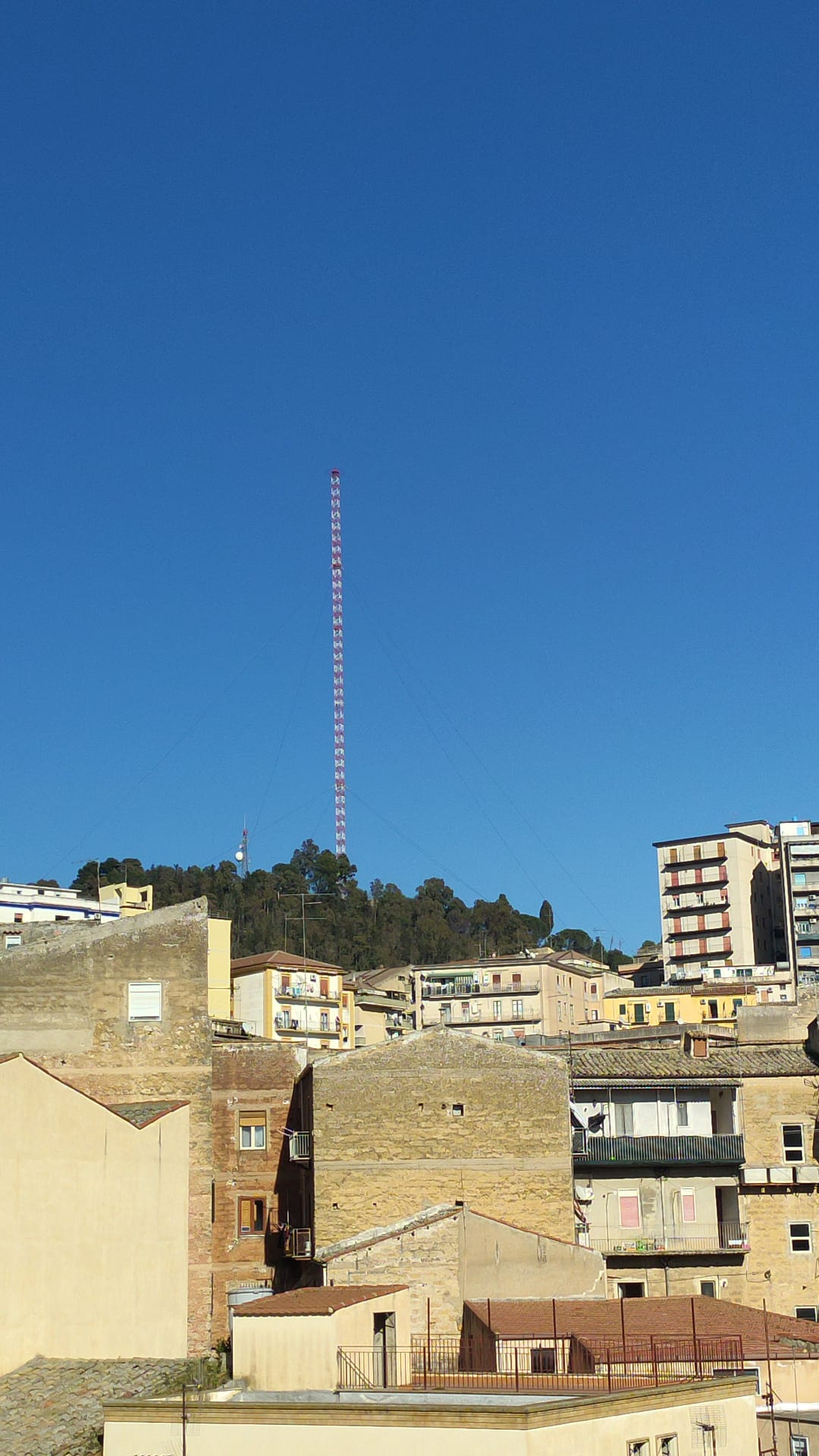
View of the RAI antenna from the historic center.

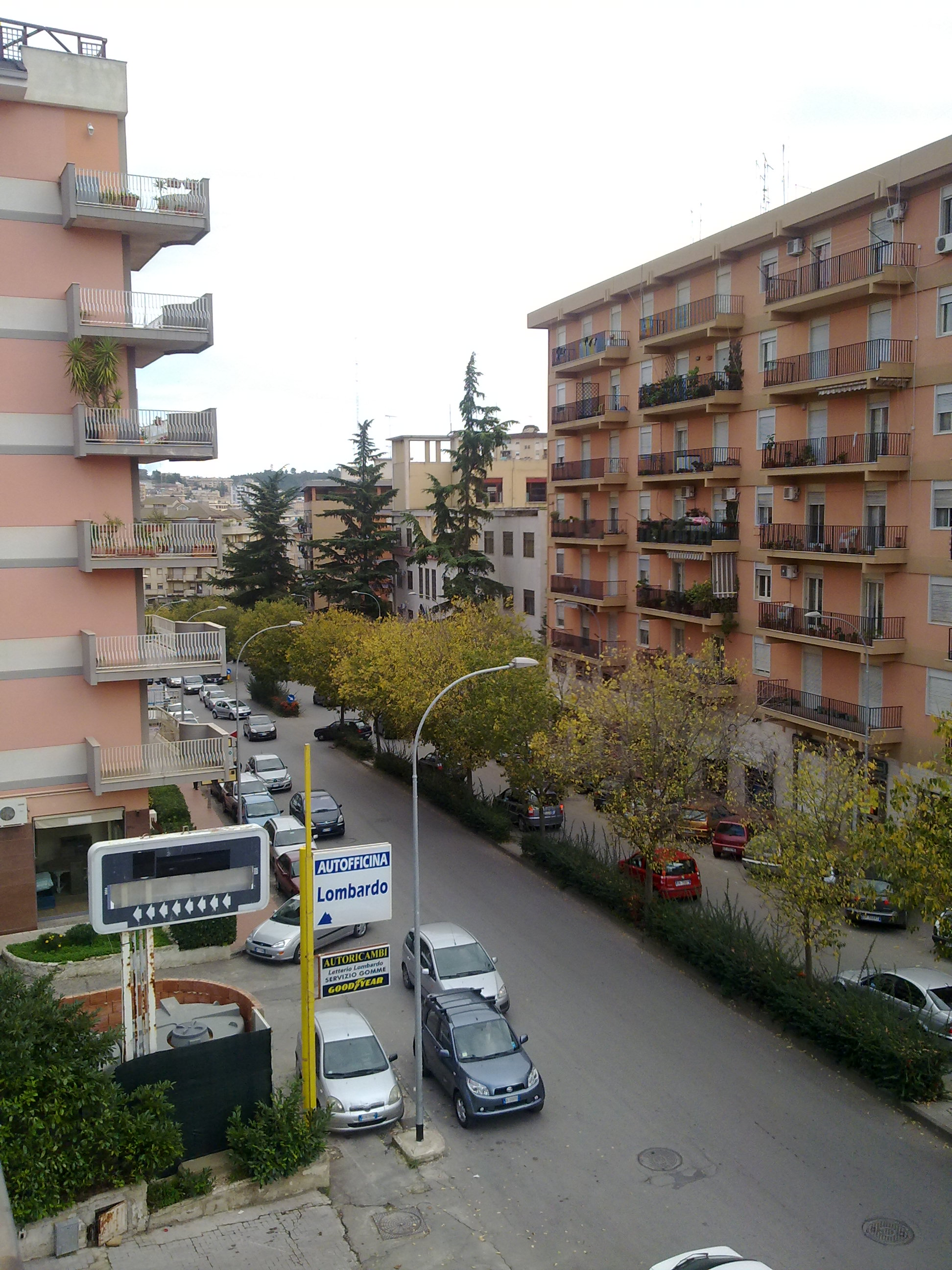
A section of Viale della Regione in the Palmintelli quarter today.

Expansion northward began in the 1970s with the construction of the working-class Santa Petronilla district (named after an ancient rural church in the area), crossed by Via G.B. De’ Cosmi. It extends from this street, branching right into Via Pietro Leone (the le Fontanelle area, home to the city's most important equestrian club) and left into Via Libertà (where the Palace of Justice and Court of Appeal are located). The area also features the Hotel San Michele, opened in 1990 and the city's only four-star hotel.

Further north, the Firrìo district is undergoing urbanization, designated for single-family villas.

Due to the rugged terrain, eastward expansion from the historic center has been minimal, limited to some 1950s–1960s constructions along the main Xiboli and Redentore streets.

== Historic districts ==
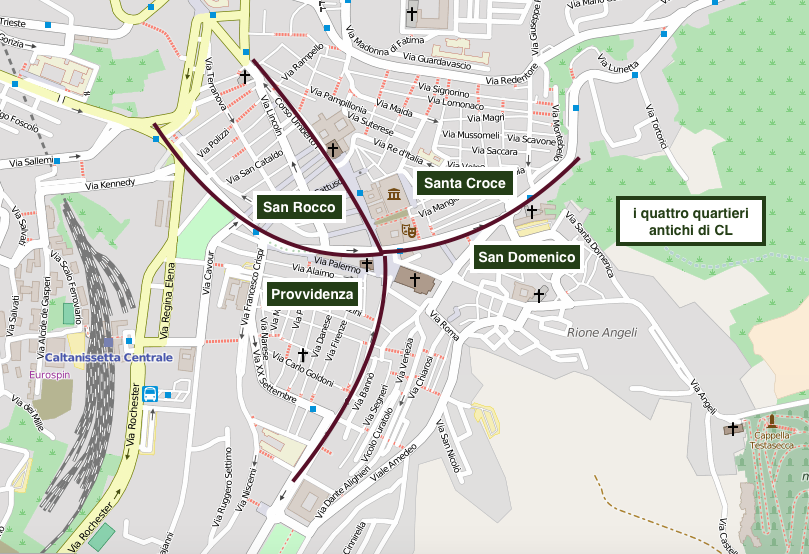
Map of the ancient districts

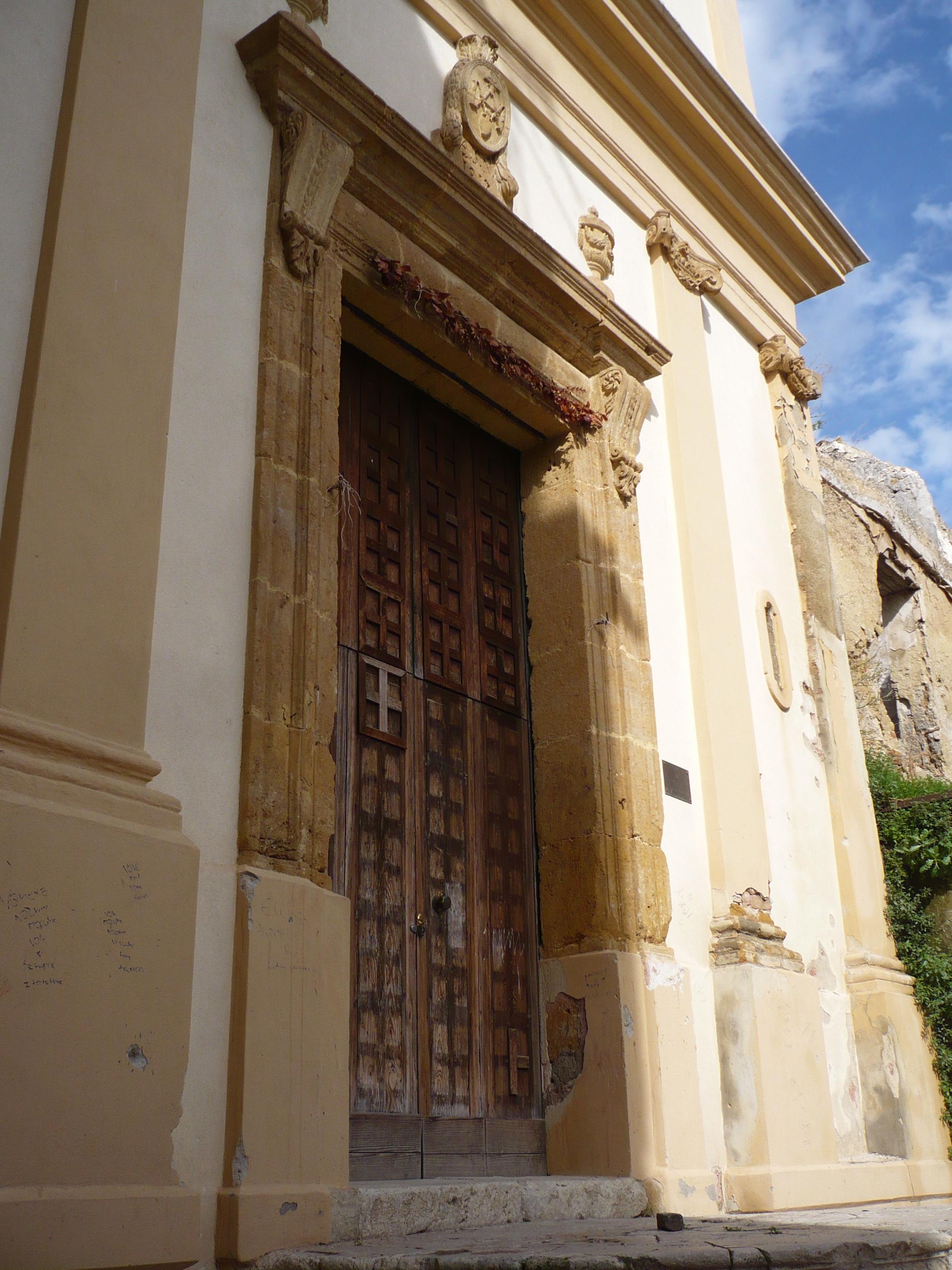
Doorway of the Church of Santa Maria della Provvidenza, at the heart of the historic Zingari district

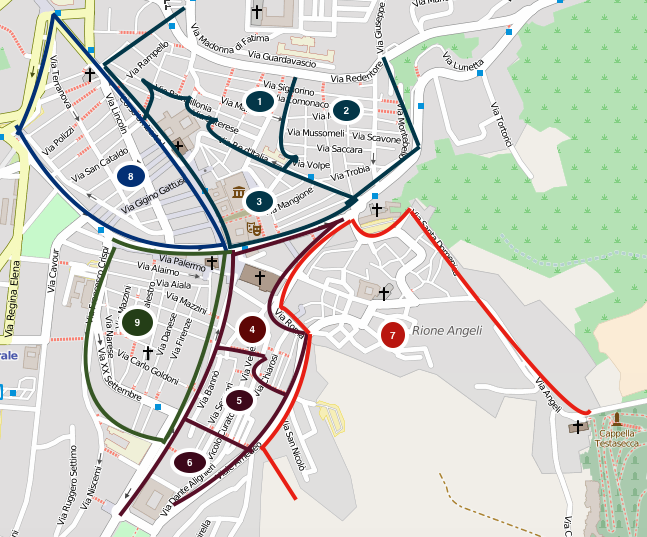
Neighborhoods and districts in Caltanissetta

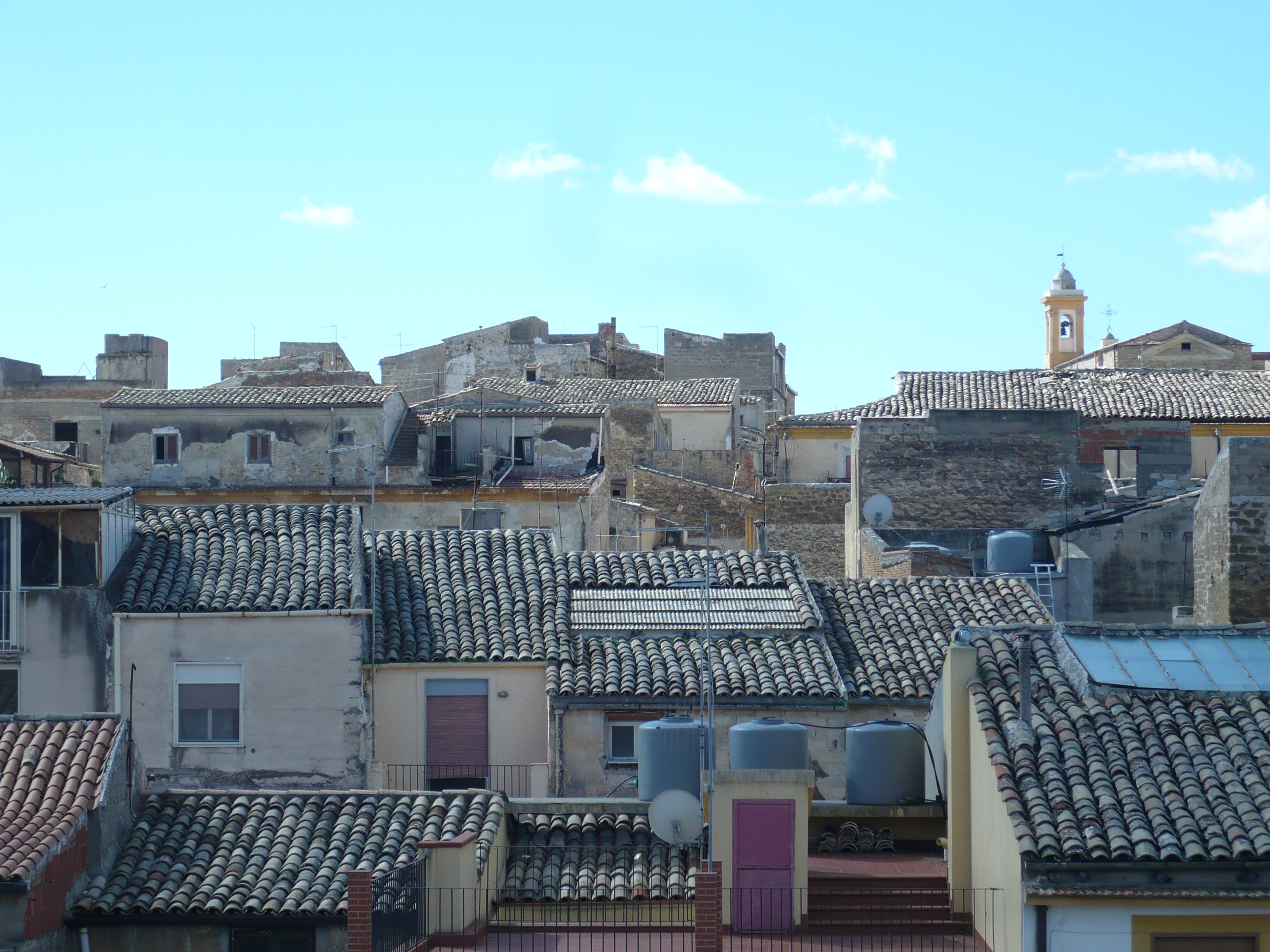
Rooftops of the Provvidenza district

From the 1700s, the city developed into four districts centered around Piazza Ferdinandea (now Piazza Garibaldi) and defined by two perpendicular main roads: Corso Umberto I and Corso Vittorio Emanuele. These roads delineate the internal boundaries of the four districts.

The oldest district, predating the square, is the San Domenico district, also known as the Angeli district, named after the church of the same name. It originally served as the Arab district from which the city's urban development began.

Next is the Provvidenza district, also called the Zingari or Furchi district, named after the church at its highest point. Historically, it may have been the city's Jewish ghetto or Giudecca, though this remains an unconfirmed historiographical hypothesis.

The third is the Santa Venera district, named after a now-vanished church that once dominated the area and the city. It later became the Santa Flavia district, incorporating the adjacent miners’ quarter built during the Fascist era.

Finally, the San Rocco district, the most recent of the old city's four districts, constructed between the 16th and 18th centuries, takes its name from a church that no longer exists. It developed along a straight road once called "u’ Cassariddu" (now Via Berengario Gaetani and Via Lincoln).

Other districts of the city include:

- Annunciata District
- Cozzarello District (or Saccara)
- San Francesco District
- San Salvatore District

=== UNRRA Casas Village ===
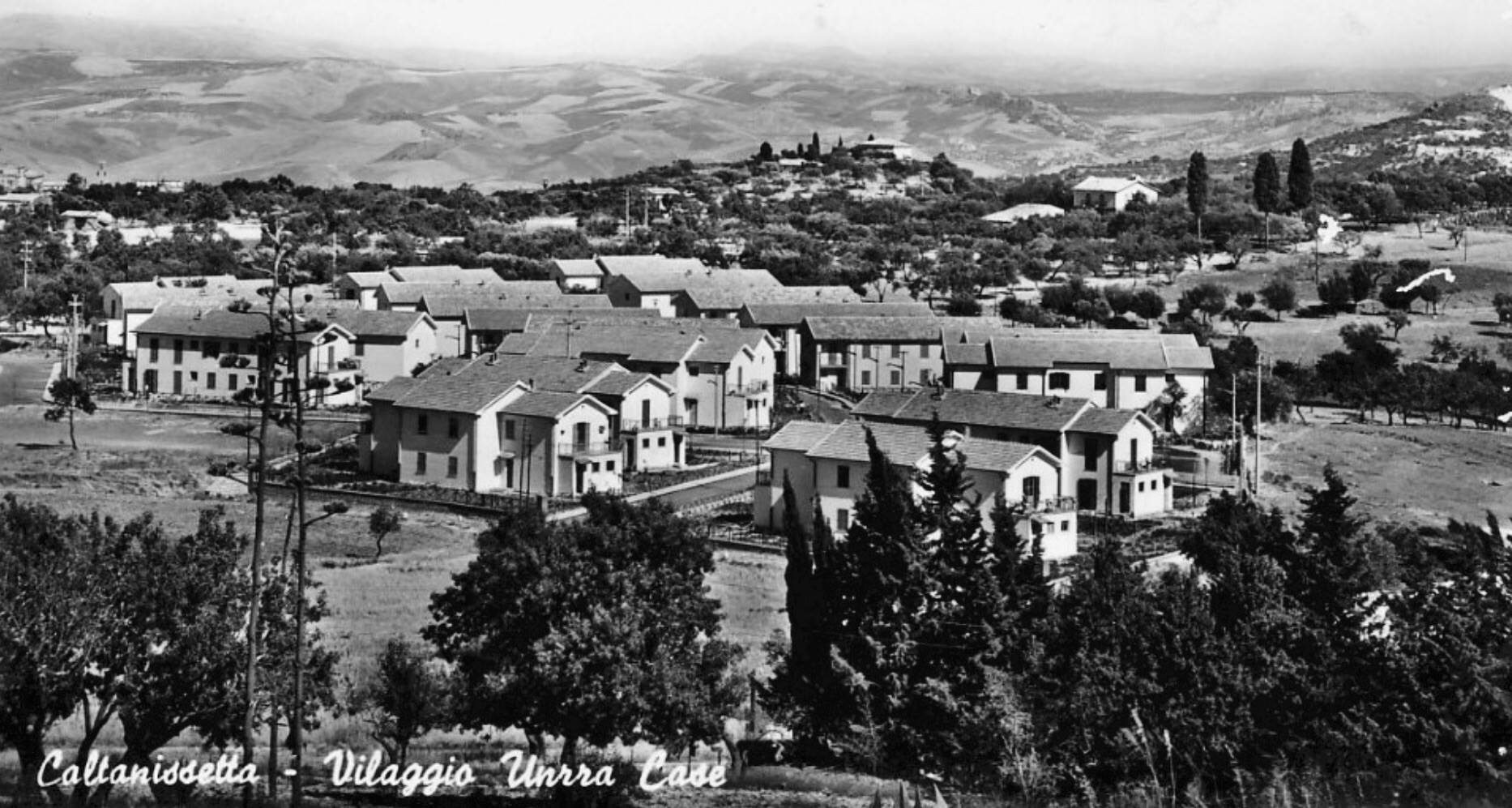
Vintage postcard of the UNRRA Casas Village (1960s)

The UNRRA Casas Village, located about 3 kilometers from the historic center, is now fully integrated into the city, abutting the northern end of the modern Viale della Regione, and is simply known as the UNRRA Casas district. This housing complex was built in the immediate postwar period by the international organization UNRRA Casas (United Nations Relief and Rehabilitation Administration), established in Washington in 1944 to provide aid and assistance to war-affected populations in Allied-controlled countries. In the city's general master plan, the UNRRA Casas Village is classified as A2 "post-unification city zones or early 20th-century city," recognized for its historical value and subject to preservation restrictions on construction interventions.

=== Hamlets ===
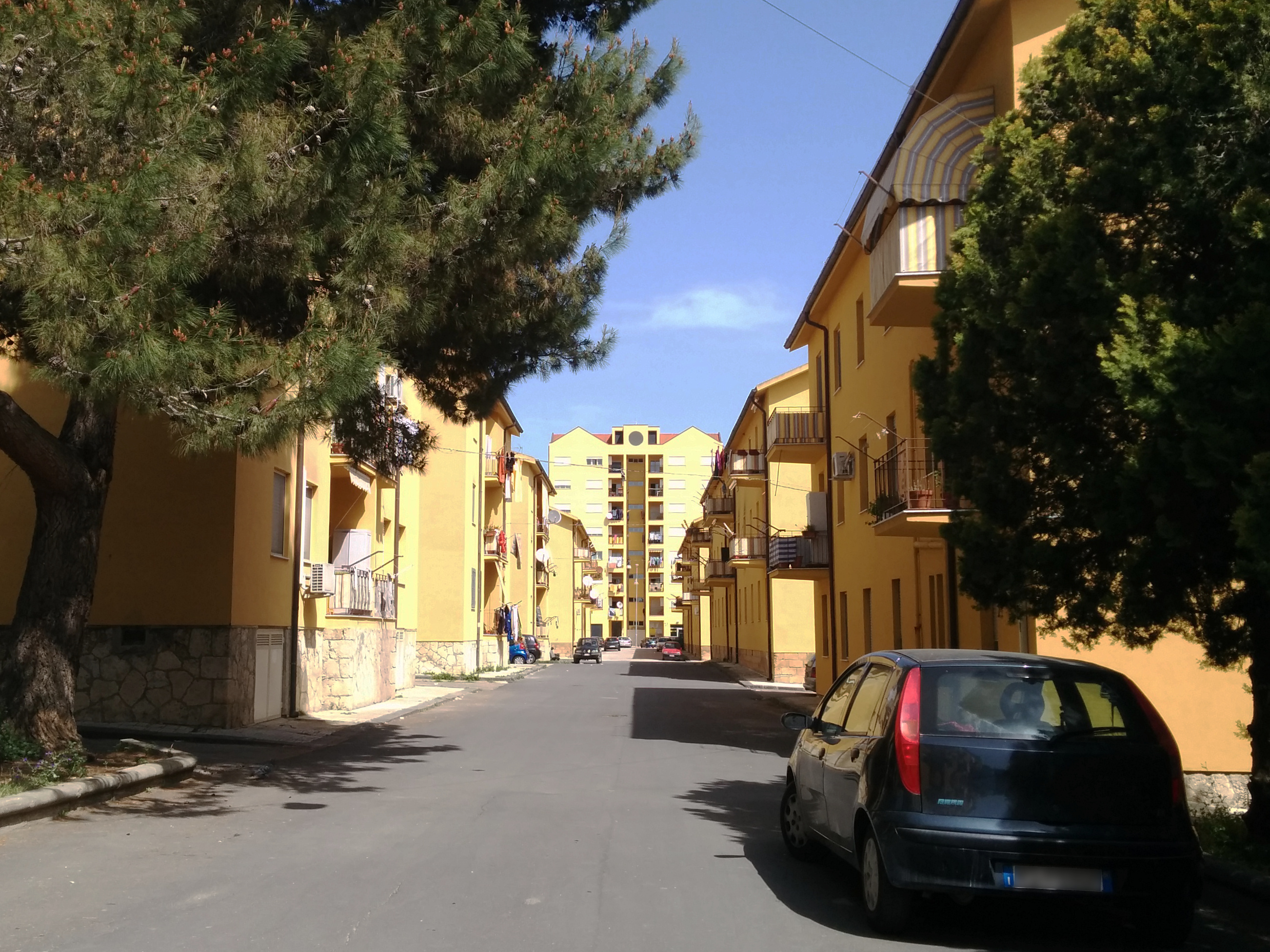
Santa Barbara Village

The hamlets of the Caltanissetta municipality are:

- Borgata Favarella
- Borgo Canicassè Casale
- Borgo Petilia
- Cozzo di Naro
- Prestianni
- Santa Rita
- Torretta
- Santa Barbara Village
- Xirbi.

These are inhabited settlements located several kilometers from the city, typically featuring a church and, in some cases, a post office and public telephone station. Some, classified as historic hamlets in the master plan under zone A3 "historic rural centers," are protected for their historical significance.

== Economy ==
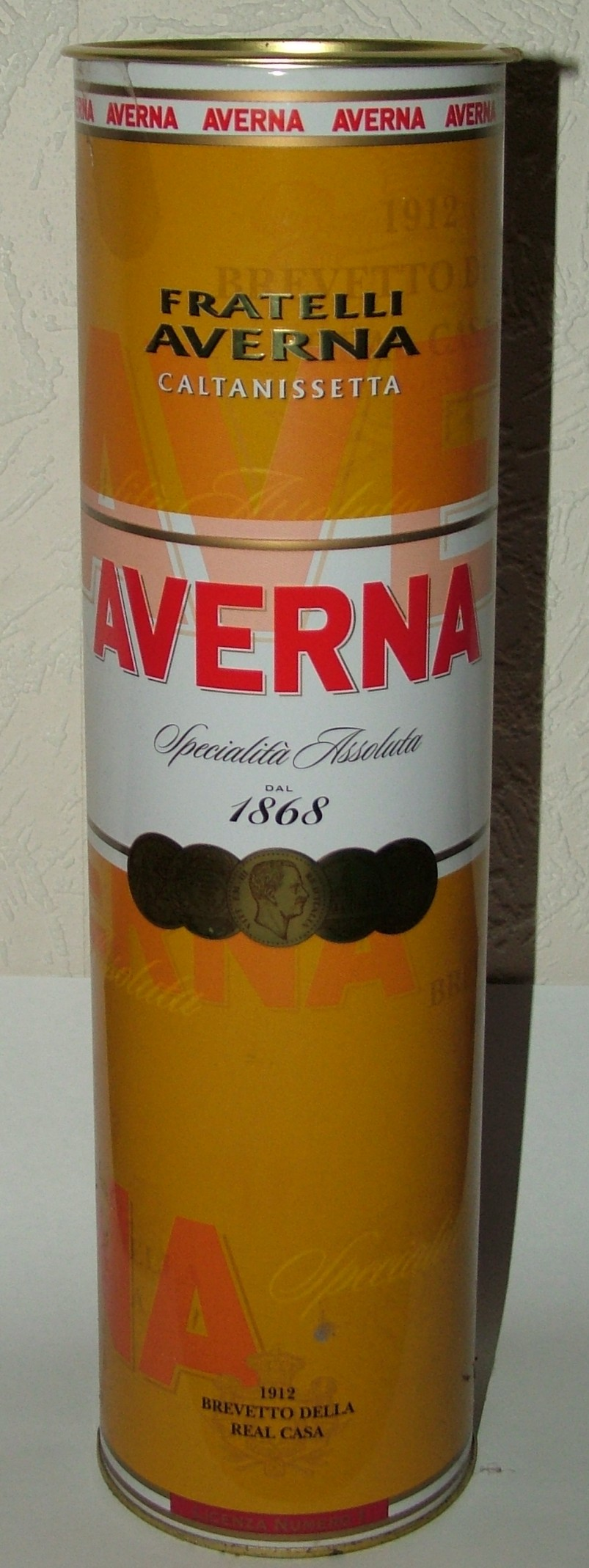
Amaro Averna

Caltanissetta is primarily known as an agricultural and administrative center in decline, with a prestigious past rooted in extraction industries. Sulfur mining was the city's dominant economic activity throughout the 19th and 20th centuries. In the early 20th century, Caltanissetta ranked among the world's leading sulfur exporters, earning it the nickname "world sulfur capital". However, foreign competition and new extraction methods led to its decline as the "sulfur capital," culminating in the closure of all mines. The Caltanissetta sulfur saga is chronicled at the Trabia Tallarita Sulfur Mines Museum, located in the former mining area between Riesi and Sommatino, part of the Mining Tourism District circuit established in 2011, spanning 2,500 km^{2} across the free municipal consortia of Enna, Caltanissetta, and Agrigento.

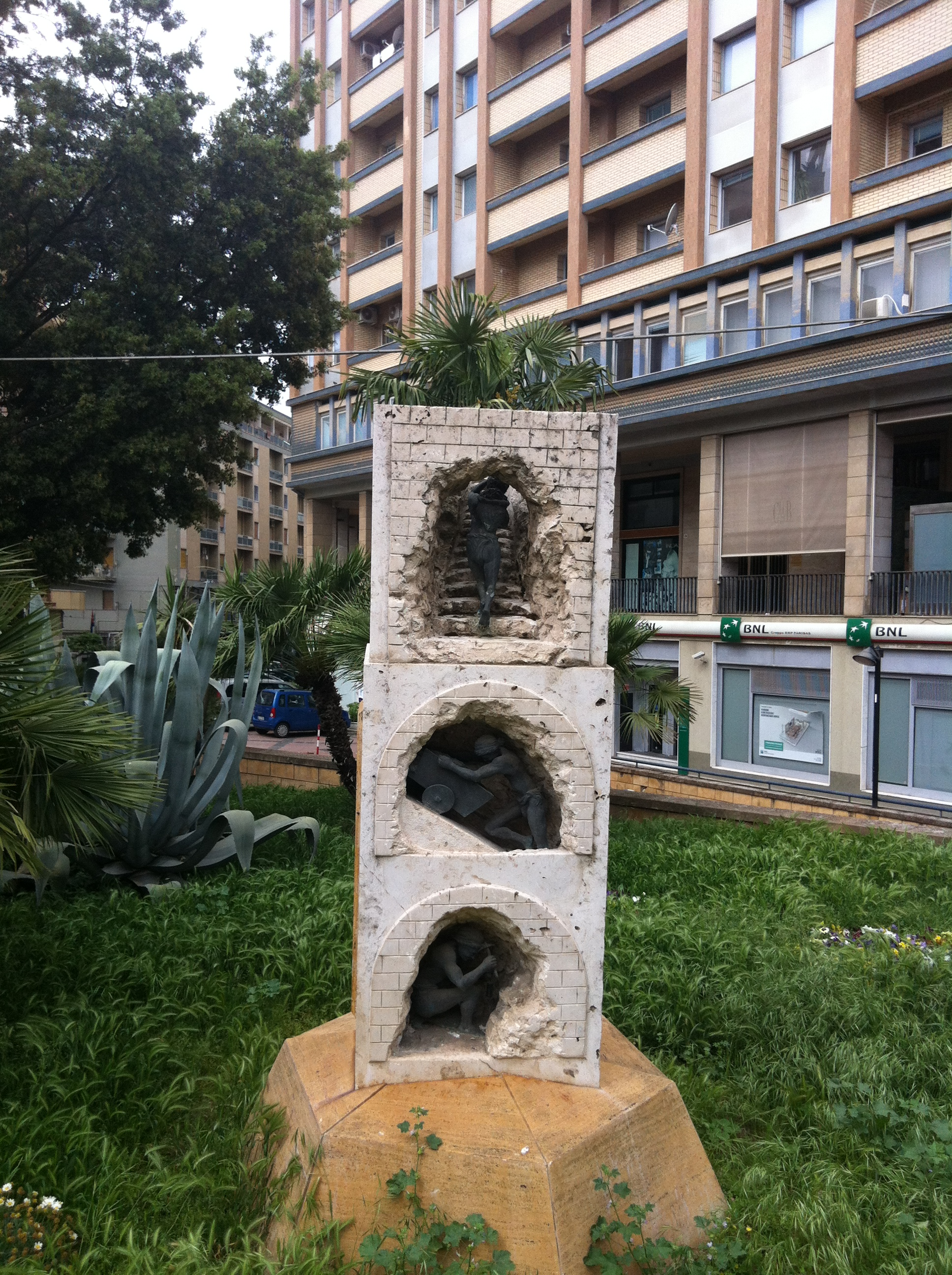
"The Memory Box" (2003), a work by sculptor Leonardo Cumbo, placed in a flowerbed on Viale Conte Testasecca to commemorate the harsh lives of sulfur miners.

With the sulfur era's end, the primary sector has remained the backbone of the local economy.

Another economic sector is craftsmanship, particularly in pipe-making, confectionery, and torrone production. Caltanissetta was once home to the Averna Group, the area's leading company.

The Caltanissetta industrial sector is fragile and still developing. Key industrial zones include Calderaro, San Cataldo Scalo, and Grottadacqua.

The Caltanissetta Industrial Zone, located in the Calderaro district, is managed by the ASI Consortium under the oversight of the Regional Department of Productive Activities. Spanning approximately 100 hectares, it hosts around a hundred businesses, primarily in the mechanical, food, construction materials, and clothing sectors.

Another industrial area within Caltanissetta's territory, San Cataldo Scalo, covers about 45 hectares and houses roughly a hundred factories, with strong representation in manufacturing, mechanical, food, textile, and electronics industries.

Lastly, between Caltanissetta and Serradifalco lies the Grottadacqua industrial area, near the SS 640.

The tertiary sector is the most developed and diverse. Beyond commercial activities and construction (the true economic driver during the postwar "boom," though frequently investigated for recurring mafia infiltration), the area hosts numerous bank branches, insurance agencies, and offices of key administrative bodies (notably, the city is home to the Tribunal and Court of Appeal). Nevertheless, the tertiary sector has notable weaknesses, including tourism. According to data from the Sicilian Region's Tourism Department, in 2005, tourist visits to the province accounted for just 1.13% of the regional total, making it Sicily's least-visited province. This low figure likely stems not from a lack of accommodations but from poor promotion of the area's artistic, monumental, and scenic heritage.

Overall, Caltanissetta's territory remains economically underdeveloped due to a confluence of unfavorable factors (infrastructure deficits, resource scarcity, pervasive illegality, political disinterest, and imprudent investments). According to Il Sole 24 Ore, the province's per capita GDP is €13,388.84 (103rd in the country), with exports accounting for only 11.47% of GDP and an average pension of €621.18.

Another critical issue contributing to underdevelopment is the difficulty in securing stable employment, particularly for vulnerable groups like youth (45.9% unemployed) and women (only 24.87% employed, among the lowest rates in Italy).

Unemployment is a persistent historical challenge, driving emigration—especially since the 1960s. While this trend had nearly halted by the late 20th century, it has resurged in recent years.

== Infrastructure and transport ==
=== Roads ===
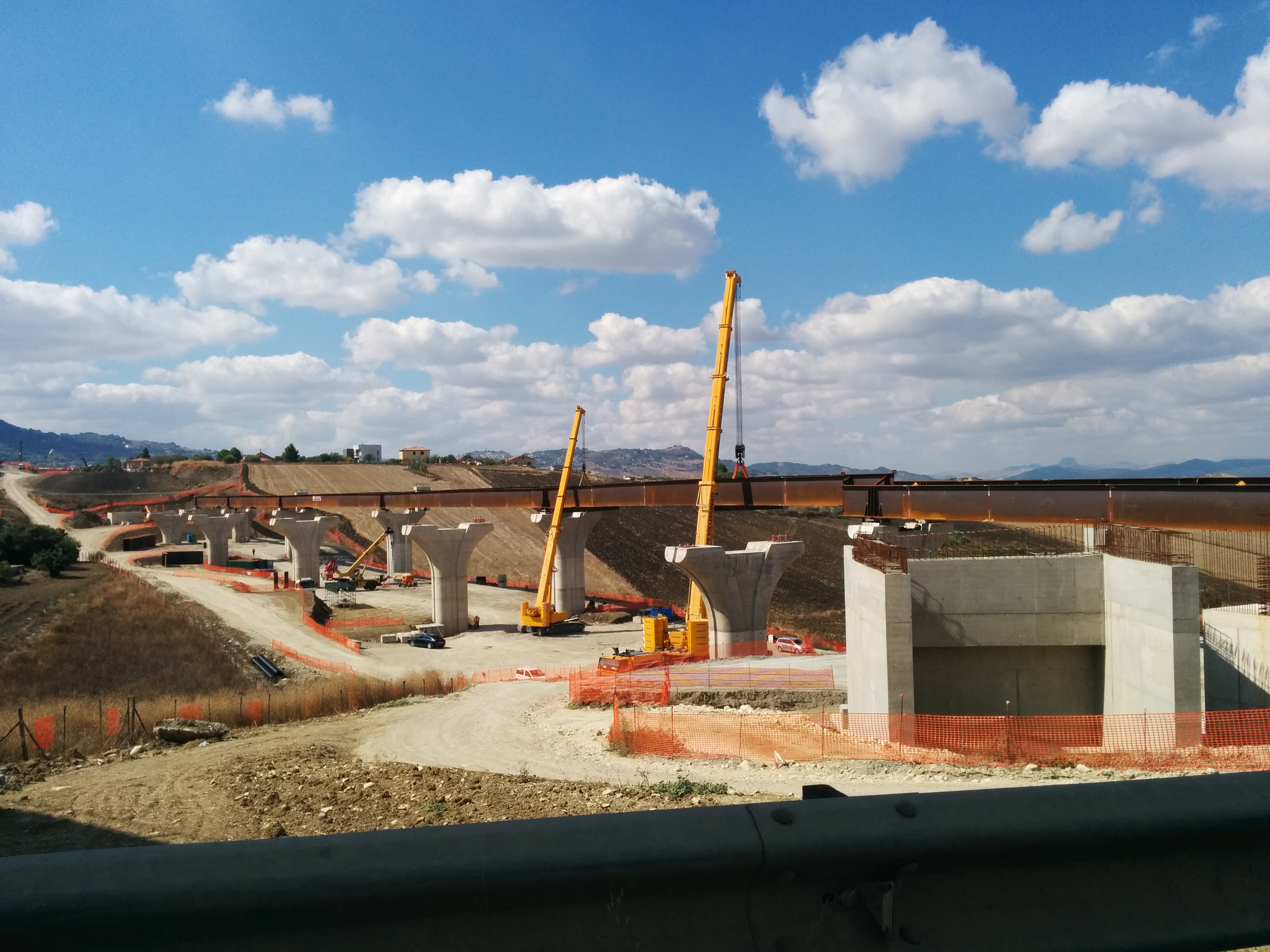
Construction work on the Strada degli Scrittori near Caltanissetta Nord (2014)

Caltanissetta is a moderately significant node in the regional road network. The main extra-urban roads serving the city are:

- The A19 Palermo-Catania motorway, a vital link to Sicily's two major cities; however, accessing the Caltanissetta junction from the city center requires a 13-km stretch of the SS 640 (commonly known as the junction), currently undergoing upgrades;
- The State Road 640 Strada degli Scrittori, the latest route to Agrigento, opened in 1971 as "State Road 640 of Porto Empedocle" and under modernization since 2009 to become a modern expressway;
- The SS 640 dir Pietraperzia Junction, a fast-flowing road connecting to the SS 626 and Pietraperzia;
- The State Road 626 of the Salso Valley, or "Caltanissetta-Gela expressway";
- The State Road 122 Agrigentina, an older route to Agrigento passing through the city center, heading west to San Cataldo, Serradifalco, and Canicattì, and east to Enna;
- The SS 122 bis to Santa Caterina Villarmosa.

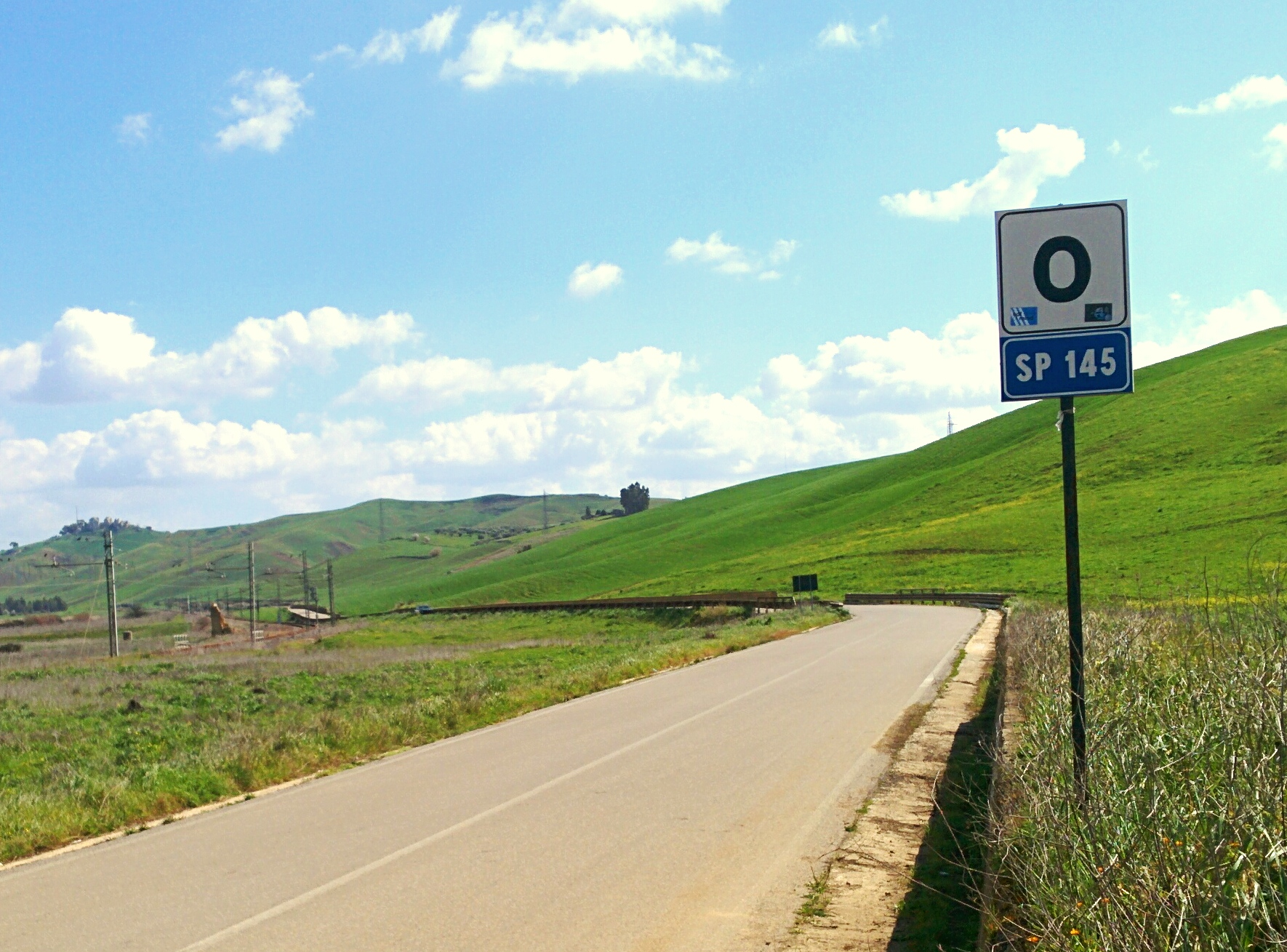
Provincial road to Marianopoli

Other roads connect to smaller centers:

- The Provincial Road 29 to San Cataldo;
- The Provincial Road 1 to Delia;
- Provincial Road 40 to Serradifalco;
- Provincial Roads 155, 44, 145, and 42 to Marianopoli;
- Provincial Road 127 to Sommatino;
- The Provincial Road 5 to San Cataldo and Favarella.

Caltanissetta was also the starting point of the State Road 191 of Pietraperzia. In 1988, the section from Caltanissetta to Pietraperzia was downgraded to the "Provincial Road 103 Caltanissetta-Pietraperzia" and lost prominence with the opening of the SS 640 dir.

=== Railways ===
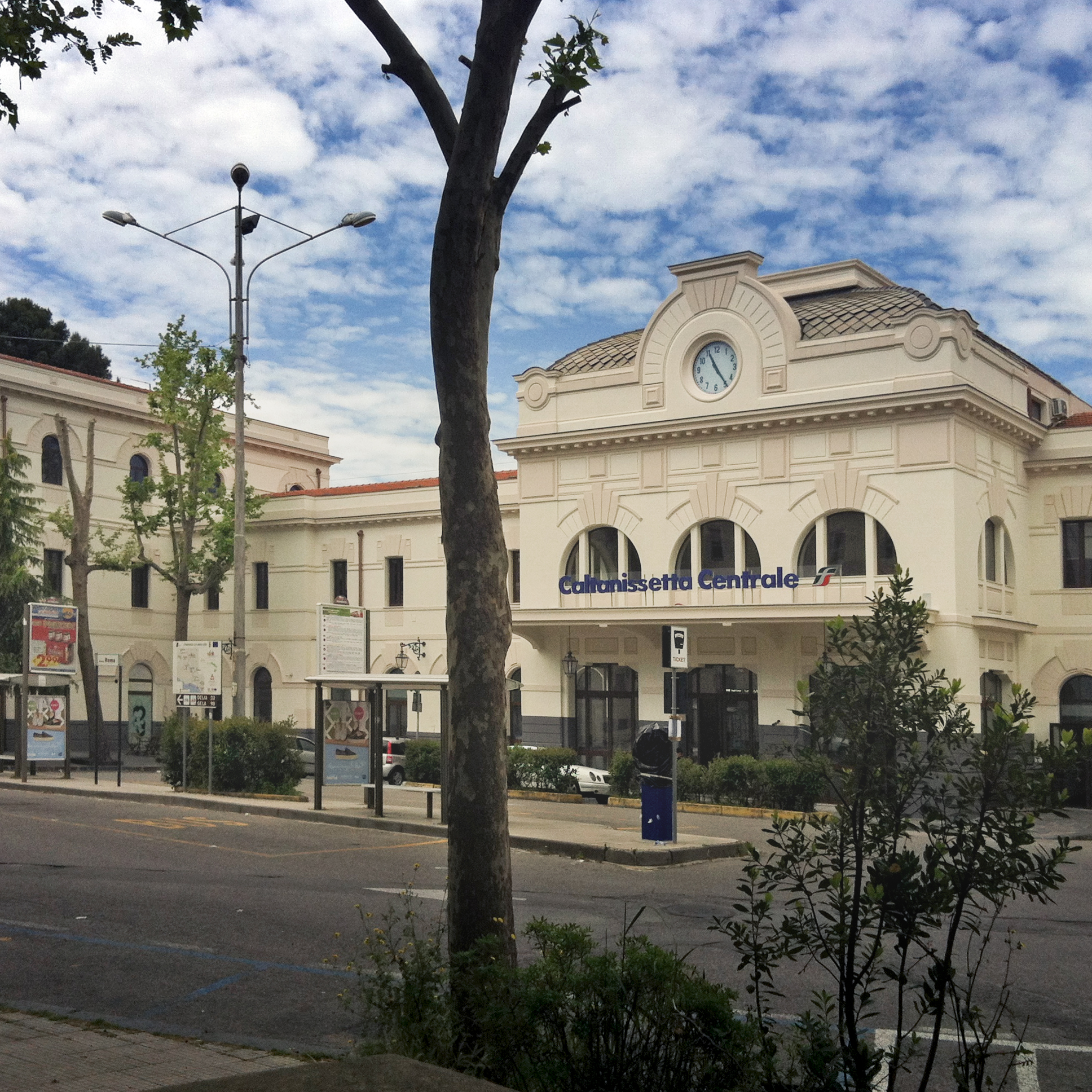
Caltanissetta Centrale Station

The city is bisected north to south by a railway tunnel approximately 2 kilometers long. At its southern exit lies the Central Station, located in Piazza Roma near the extra-urban bus terminal, serving the entire city. Though now in a strategic, well-connected area, when inaugurated in September 1876, it stood at the city's outskirts.

Today, the station primarily serves commuters—workers and secondary school students—and handles only regional traffic, with key destinations including Catania, Modica, Agrigento, and Xirbi (a transfer point for Palermo and Catania).

About 7 kilometers north of the city lies the Caltanissetta Xirbi Station, situated in a rural area near the Xirbi hamlet, opened in 1869. Originally named after nearby Santa Caterina Villarmosa, it remains closer to that town. This station is a crucial railway hub in Sicily, lying on the Palermo-Catania line and connecting to the line from Agrigento. Its distance from the city long limited its use to passengers catching connections. However, following the 2015 landslide that damaged the Himera viaduct on the A19, disrupting road travel, enhanced direct rail links between Palermo and Catania revitalized the station, making it a busy transit point.

As part of the new high-capacity Palermo-Catania railway, the station is slated for upgrades to handle increased traffic from high-speed services.

=== Urban mobility ===
The city operates a bus-based urban transport system managed by the local SCAT company. The central hub for all lines is in Piazza Roma, opposite the Caltanissetta Centrale railway station. The extra-urban bus terminal is located on Via Rochester.

== Administration ==
=== Twin towns ===
- Rochester, since 1965

== Sports ==
=== Weightlifting ===
One of Caltanissetta's most practiced sports is weightlifting, which enjoys significant investment. With high-quality facilities and gyms, the city is considered one of Italy's most innovative hubs for weightlifting and serves as the regional headquarters of the Italian Weightlifting Federation. Notably, 50 of Italy's 180 national records—15 men's and 35 women's—have been set by Caltanissetta athletes.

It also hosts the youth division of the Fiamme Oro Sports Group and annually produces numerous athletes selected for the national team. The only five Caltanissetta Olympians in history were weightlifters:

- Giovanni Scarantino, at the Seoul 1988, Barcelona 1992, and Atlanta 1996 Olympics;
- Eva Giganti, at the Sydney 2000 Olympics;
- Genny Caterina Pagliaro, at the Beijing 2006 Olympics;
- Luca Parla, at the Singapore 2010 Youth Olympics;
- Mirco Scarantino, at the London 2012 and Rio de Janeiro 2016 Olympics.

Caltanissetta also hosted the Italian Absolute Championships finals in 2012 and 2018.

=== Football ===
The city's first football club was U.S. Nissena 1929, which competed in the Prima Divisione, Serie C, and fourth division for several years before disbanding in 1960.

In 2020, a merger between Sporting Vallone, formerly Mussomeli, and Nissa F.C. enabled the city to field a team in the Eccellenza championship.

=== Motorsport ===
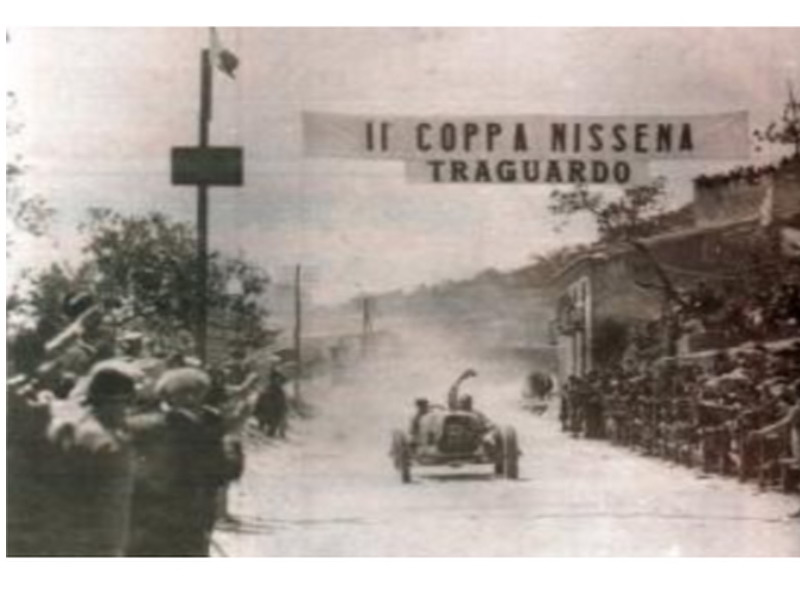
Finish line of the second edition of the Nissena Cup, 1923

Motorsport holds a prominent place among the city's sports. The most significant event is the Nissena Cup, a hillclimbing race first held in 1922. Other competitions include the Caltanissetta City Rally and the Borgo Slalom, held along roads in nearby districts.

=== Tennis ===
The international Città di Caltanissetta tournament is a key annual event in the city. Starting in 1999 as a Satellite category tournament, it joined the ITF Men's Circuit in 2005 and was part of the ATP Challenger Tour from 2009 to 2018. In 2024, the international tournament returned with the M15 category.

=== Other sports ===
Handball
The leading men's handball team is Nova Audax, competing in the Serie A2 championship.

Futsal
In men's futsal, a notable former team was Nissa Futsal (formed in 2012 from the merger of Nissa 5 and Futsal Cl), which played in the Serie B championship. Another team, Pro Nissa Futsal, founded in 2009, competes in the Serie B 2019/2020 season after winning the previous Series C1 championship.

Volleyball
Caltanissetta's main volleyball teams include the men's Look Nissa Volley, playing in the First Division, and the women's Posta Express Albaverde, competing in Serie C.

Rugby
The city's men's rugby team, Nissa Rugby, participates in the Serie C championship.

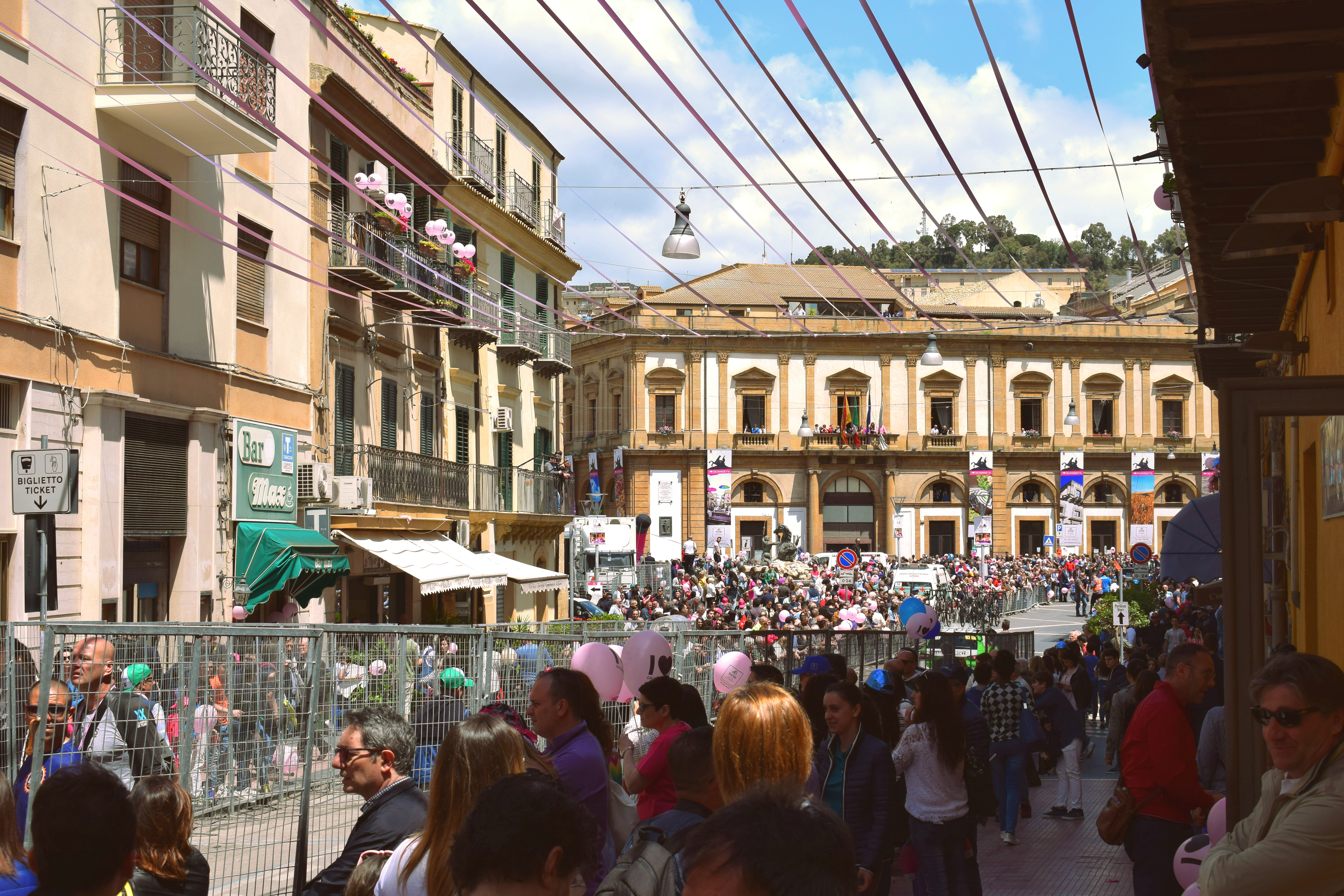
Piazza Garibaldi during the sixth stage of the 2018 Giro d’Italia

Cycling
The city is home to cycling associations like Open Bike, Imera Bike, and the "Team Lombardo Bike," which competes nationwide. A municipal mountain bike trail is available for training. In 1976, Caltanissetta hosted the finish of the second stage of the 59th Giro d’Italia, won by Roger De Vlaeminck, and in 2018, it served as the starting point for the sixth stage of the 101st Giro, showcasing its continued relevance in competitive cycling.

=== Sporting facilities ===
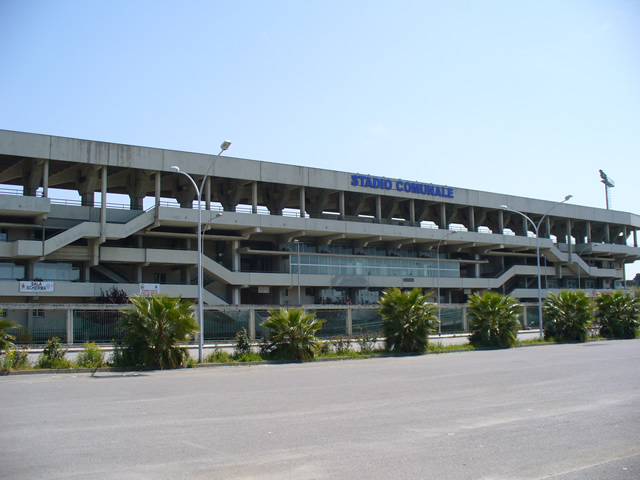
The Marco Tomaselli Stadium

Caltanissetta boasts a range of sports facilities, primarily concentrated in the southern Pian del Lago district and the western Poggio Sant’Elia district. Major venues include:

- Marco Tomaselli Stadium: A modern multi-purpose sports center, also known as the Pian del Lago stadium after the district where it is located, it has a synthetic turf surface, an athletic track and a fencing hall; it seats 12,000 and is one of the largest facilities in Sicily. In 1994, it hosted a qualifying match for the 1996 European Under-21 Championship between Italy and Croatia; the Italian national team played in Nissa jerseys because both teams wore the same kit and the match started very late. The final of the 2003 Italian Rugby Cup and the 2013 Six Nations U20 match between Italy and France were also played there.
- Palmintelli Stadium: It is the historic stadium of the city, built during the 20-year fascist period. It is located in the central Region Avenue, offers five thousand seats and has a clay field.
- Villa Amedeo Tennis Club: Officially known as the Caltanissetta Tennis Club, it is located downstream from Villa Amedeo, from which it takes its name. The history of the Tennis Club began in the 1930s, when the first clay court was built; in later years the facility was expanded with the construction of other courts, and in 1967 the current sports association was founded. Today there are four clay courts and every year the Città di Caltanissetta Tournament is held, which since 2009 has been included in the ATP professional circuit.
- PalaCarelli: The Provincial Gymnasium, with a maximum capacity of 5,000 seats, the fourth largest among the facilities of its kind at regional level, has been the stage for important events, not only of a sporting nature, that have taken place over the years. In 2010 the Italian Junior Weightlifting Championships were held, in 2011 the Italian Under-17 Weightlifting Championships and in 2012 the Italian Absolute Weightlifting Championships. Also in 2012, it hosted the Group 2 qualifiers for the 2012 FIFA Futsal World Cup. The gymnasium has hosted a number of national artists such as Pooh, Antonello Venditti, Modà and others. Also worthy of mention are the other two municipal gyms: the PalaChiarandà (with a capacity of 1,000 seats) and the PalaCannizzaro (with 2,000 seats). All of these facilities offer a wide range of indoor sports, including martial arts, weightlifting, fencing, basketball, volleyball and handball.
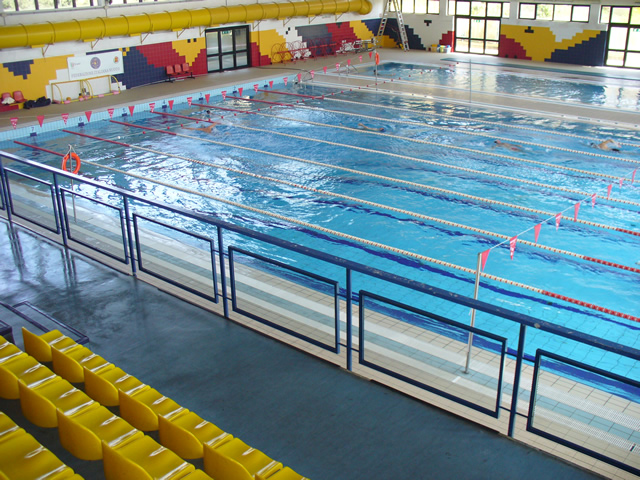
  Municipal swimming pool
- Municipal Swimming Pool: It consists of two swimming pools, a short one (25 m long, 17 m wide and up to 3.50 m deep) and a smaller one (25 m x 6 m, 90 cm deep). Inside the complex there is also a gymnasium, a bar area and an area for commercial activities; it has a capacity of two hundred seats, while the grandstand can hold four hundred spectators. Since 2002 it has been managed by the Amateur Sports Association Swimming srl.
- Michelangelo Cannavò Multipurpose Centre: It is equipped with outdoor clay and concrete courts for various sports (soccer, volleyball, basketball, etc.), a skate park, a mountain bike track and a jogging track. During the summer, the same facility also has a sand court for beach volleyball and beach soccer. The skate park, one of the largest in southern Italy, is no longer usable due to incidents of vandalism that completely destroyed the wooden ramps.
- Street Factory Eclettica: This is a 3000 m^{2} sports facility where skateboarding, skating, bmx, field hockey, basketball and free climbing are practiced. Opened in 2016, it is the result of a project selected in the Boom! Urban Lungs competition. In addition to sports activities, it is also designed to host cultural and artistic events.
- Shooting range: The local branch of the National Shooting Range has been operating there since 1884. It was requisitioned in 1939 due to the Second World War and then abandoned until 1980, when the Military State Property returned it free of charge to the then Army Captain Giovanni Vitali, who rebuilt the section there. The range includes a 10-meter stand for pistols and air rifles and a 50-meter facility where weapons with a kinetic energy not exceeding 63 kgm can be fired. The institutional activity delegated by law to the TSN sections for the training of all persons performing armed services in public and private entities is also carried out there.

== See also ==
- Roman Catholic Diocese of Caltanissetta
- Province of Caltanissetta

== Bibliography ==
- Curcuruto, Michele (2001). I signori dello zolfo. Personaggi, vicende, aneddoti della borghesia mineraria siciliana fra '800 e '900 [The Sulfur Lords: Figures, Events, and Anecdotes of the Sicilian Mining Bourgeoisie Between the 19th and 20th Centuries] (in Italian). Lussografica. ISBN 978-88-8243-093-1.
