= Villa of Geraci =

Roman villa in Sicily, Italy

Villa Romana di contrada Gerace
- Location within Italy
- 37.465295014379336°N 14.253325926144448°E
- Type: Roman villa
- Cultures: Roman
- Location: Sicily, Italy

History
- Built: early 3rd century AD

The Villa of Gerace (or Geraci; Italian: Villa Romana di contrada Gerace) is a Roman villa located near Enna along provincial road 78 at the Rastello-Ramata junction, on the Fontanazza estate, Sicily.

The elaborate villa was part of a rich estate covering 3.5 ha, one of the many historically reported but rarely excavated latifundia on the island. It lies about 15 km from the Villa Romana del Casale at Piazza Armerina and 5 km from the ancient city of Sabucina.

== History and description ==
The remains of a villa rustica were found in the early 1990s when a flood revealed a mosaic floor. Archaeology has continued since then, and from 2013 by the University of British Columbia.

The villa of at least 10,000 m^{2} area is further evidence that Roman villas in Sicily are not just represented by a few examples such as the exceptional Villa del Casale but have a significant distribution density which raises estimates of the rural population and economy. It is known that Sicily through its latifundia, or villa estates, was vital to the agricultural economy of the Roman Empire and produced most of the wheat, barley, olives and grapes imported by the city of Rome. Few latifundia have been properly excavated in Sicily so Gerace is important in being able to fill gaps in knowledge of the late Roman economy.

The owner was one Philippianus as indicated by the mosaic text and stamps on many recovered roof tiles. He also owned the villa 12 km away at Piano della Clesia near Sabucina as indicated by tile stamps there.

The earliest buildings date to late Roman period of 325-50 AD, and after their collapse possibly in the earthquake of 361 they were overbuilt in about 370 by a more extensive villa which may never have been completed, and was burnt down 100 years later.

Five of the ten main rooms uncovered in the villa are situated around a peristyle and have mosaic floors. The range of colours used in the mosaics is very varied: black, grey, red, green, pink, white and the compositions are accurately made. The mosaics of the peristyle and the southern corridor particularly have numerous motifs. The skilled workmanship and design indicate North African influence and similarity to that of the Villa Romana del Casale.

A freestanding bath house has also been excavated which used exotic coloured marbles to face floors and walls in some rooms and mosaic floors in others, particularly in the frigidarium whose floor is unique in its geometric design and dates from probably 380-400. A text in mosaic is written around all four sides floor which is also probably unique, and reads: PHILIPPIANORVM PRAEDIA FELI[cia]/CAPITOLINIS GAVDIVM/PLVRA FABRICETIS MELLIORA DEDI/CETIS ASCLEPIADES SENESCAS CVM TVIS Translation: May the estates of the Philippiani prosper. Joy to the Capitolini (e.g. in contests). May you build more and may you dedicate better things. Asclepiades, may you grow old with your family. Philippianus' monogram, used on the roof tiles, is also repeated in the mosaic. Asclepiades might have been his son.

The baths may never have been completed as one of three pools in the cold room was never installed and its wall decoration unfinished. After the earthquake repairs were followed by smashing of mosaics in heated rooms to retrieve bricks and removing marble panels from walls. The cold room's mosaic was left intact.

There is also a significant number of brick and tile kilns in an industrial area dating from the late 4th to the 6th c. AD. Tile-stamp designs featuring horses and many equid bones imply there was a stud farm on the estate.

The villa was probably destroyed by another earthquake after 450, judging by cracks and debris in the building. However, a more modest early Byzantine settlement was built on the site from about 500.

== Sources ==
- E. CILIA PLATAMONE, Rinvenimenti musivi nel territorio di Enna tra passato e presente, in Atti IV Colloquio AISCOM [Palermo 1996], Ravenna 1997, p. 273-280
- "Enna un tesoro ancora tutto da scoprire: la Villa Romana di contrada Geraci | Enna Press tutte le notizie di Enna". ennapress.it. Archived from the original on 2019-10-31.
- "Archeologia dei Nebrodi - Photos". facebook.com.
