= Sabucina =

Archaeological site in Caltanissetta, Sicily, Italy

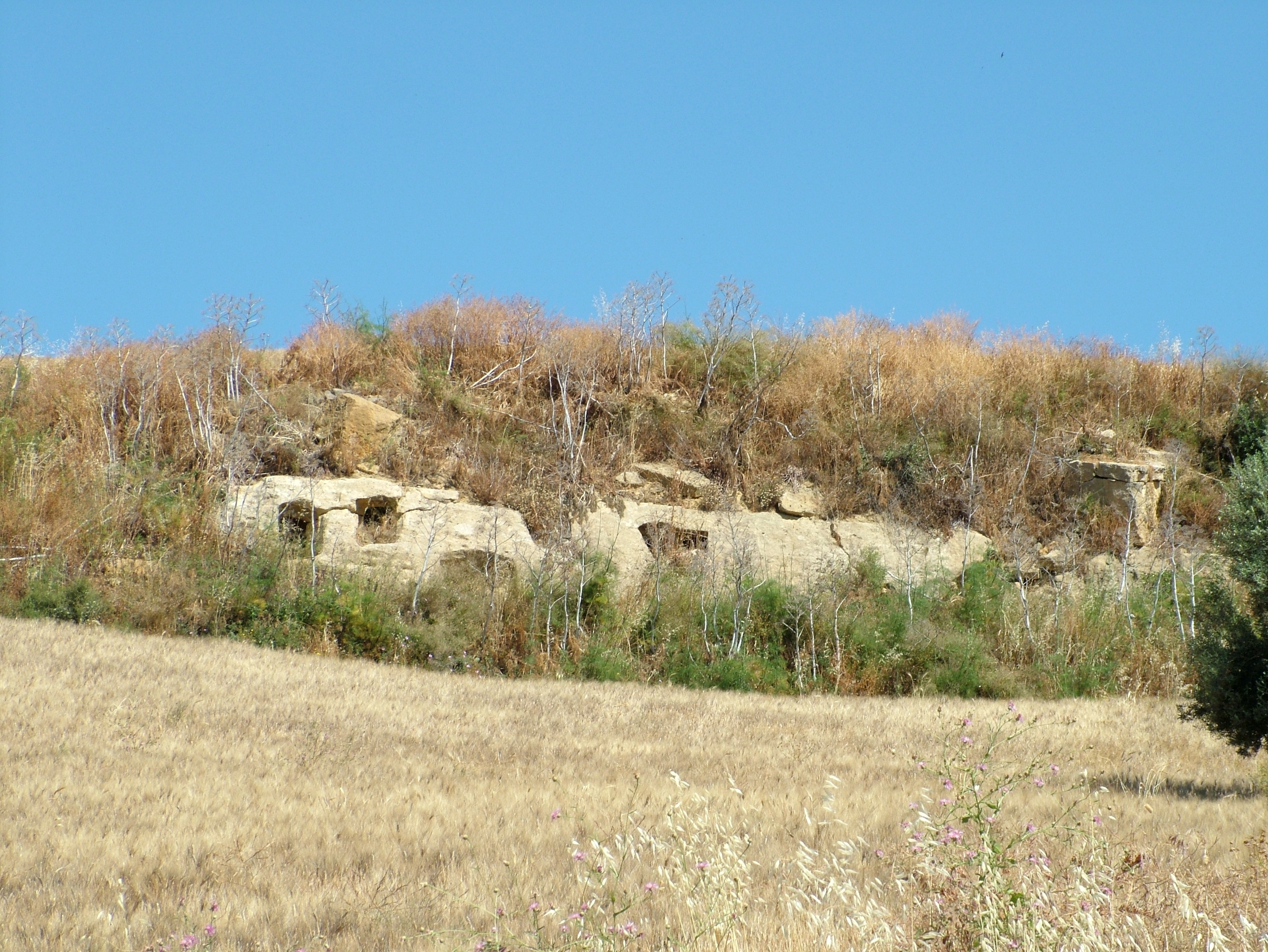
- The grotticella tombs of Sabucina

- Location within Sicily
- 37°30′9.47″N 14°7′15.82″E
- Periods: c.2300-300 BC
- Location: Caltanissetta, Sicily, Italy

Site notes
- Archaeologists: Piero Orlandini

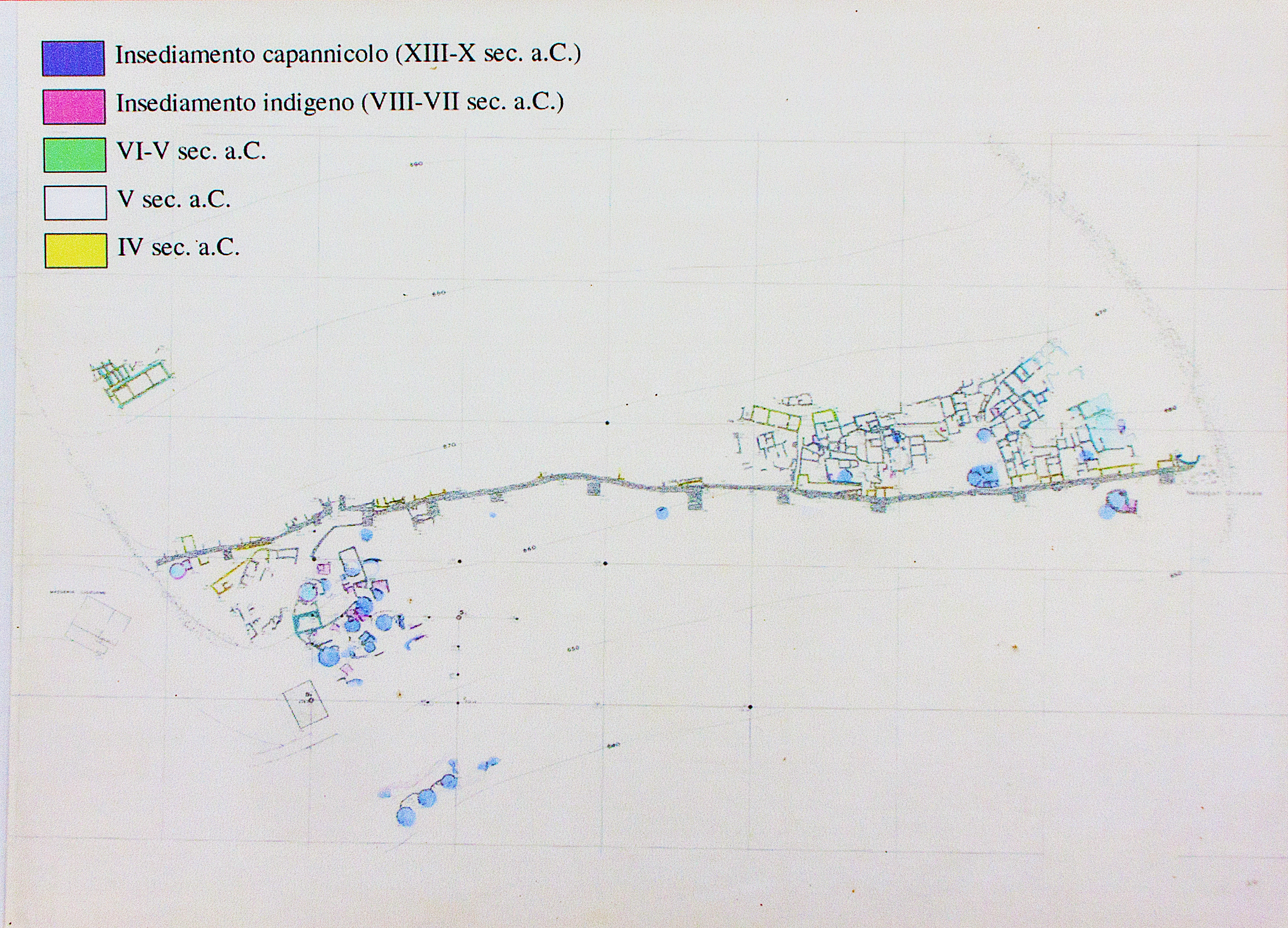
Plan of excavations

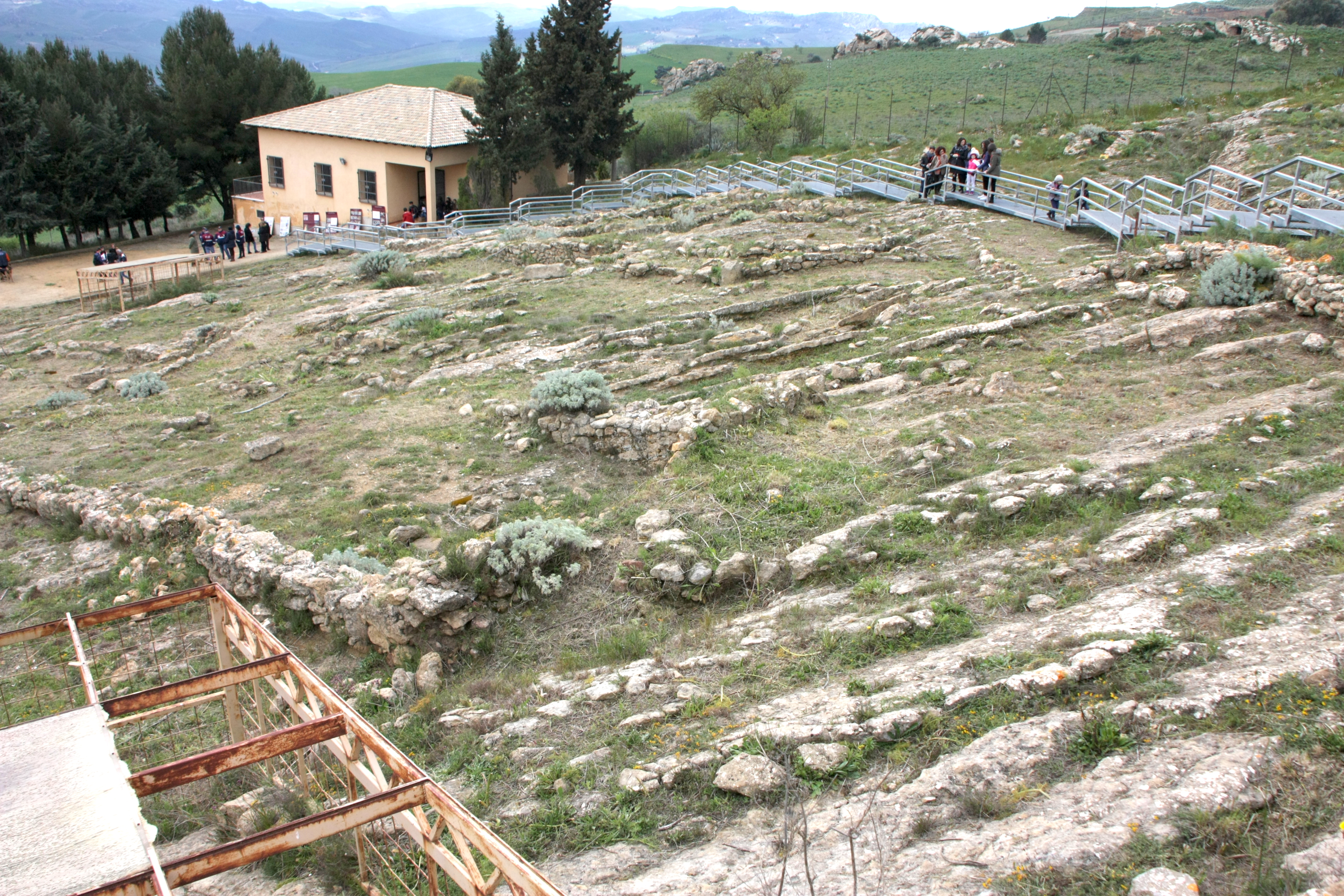

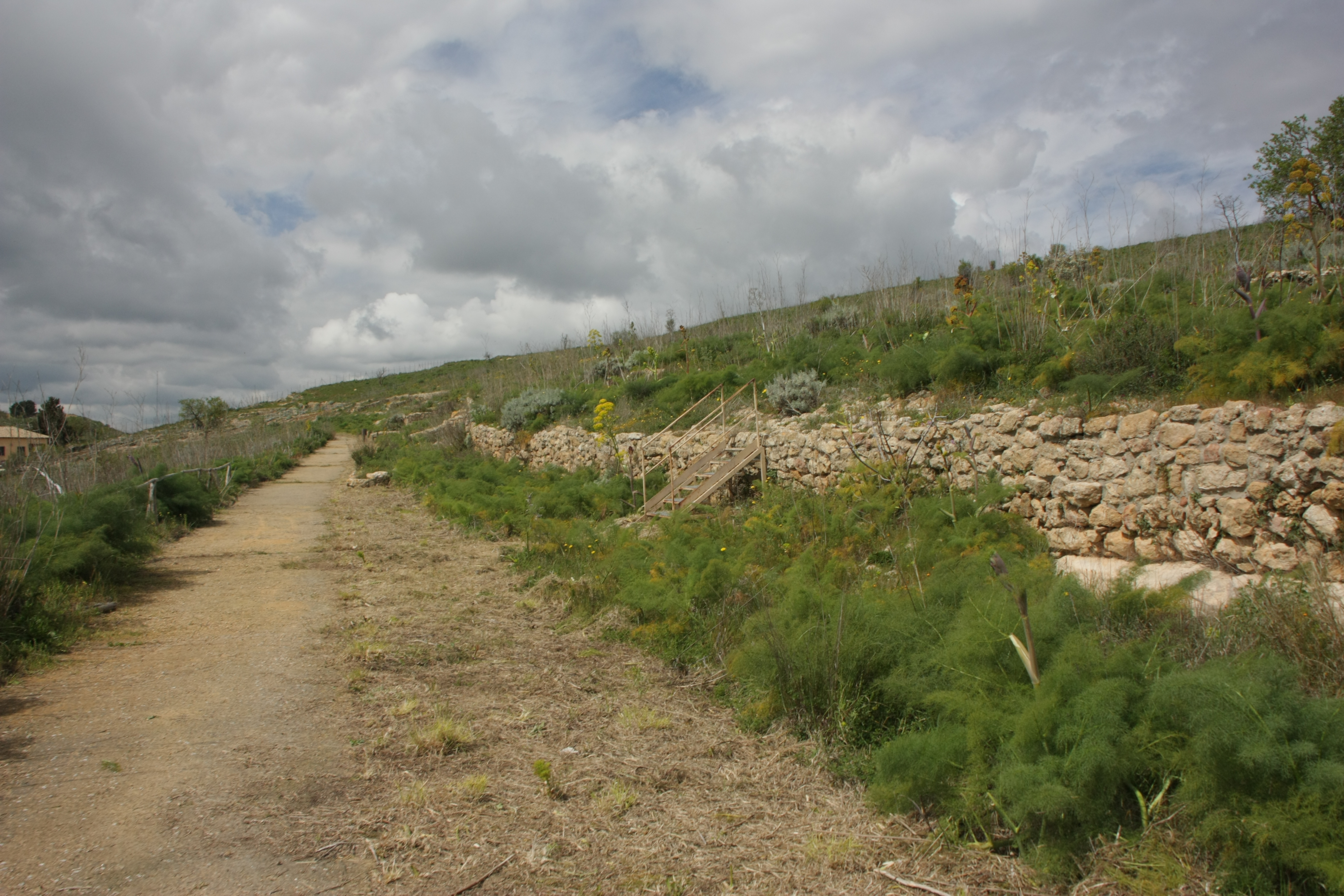
City walls

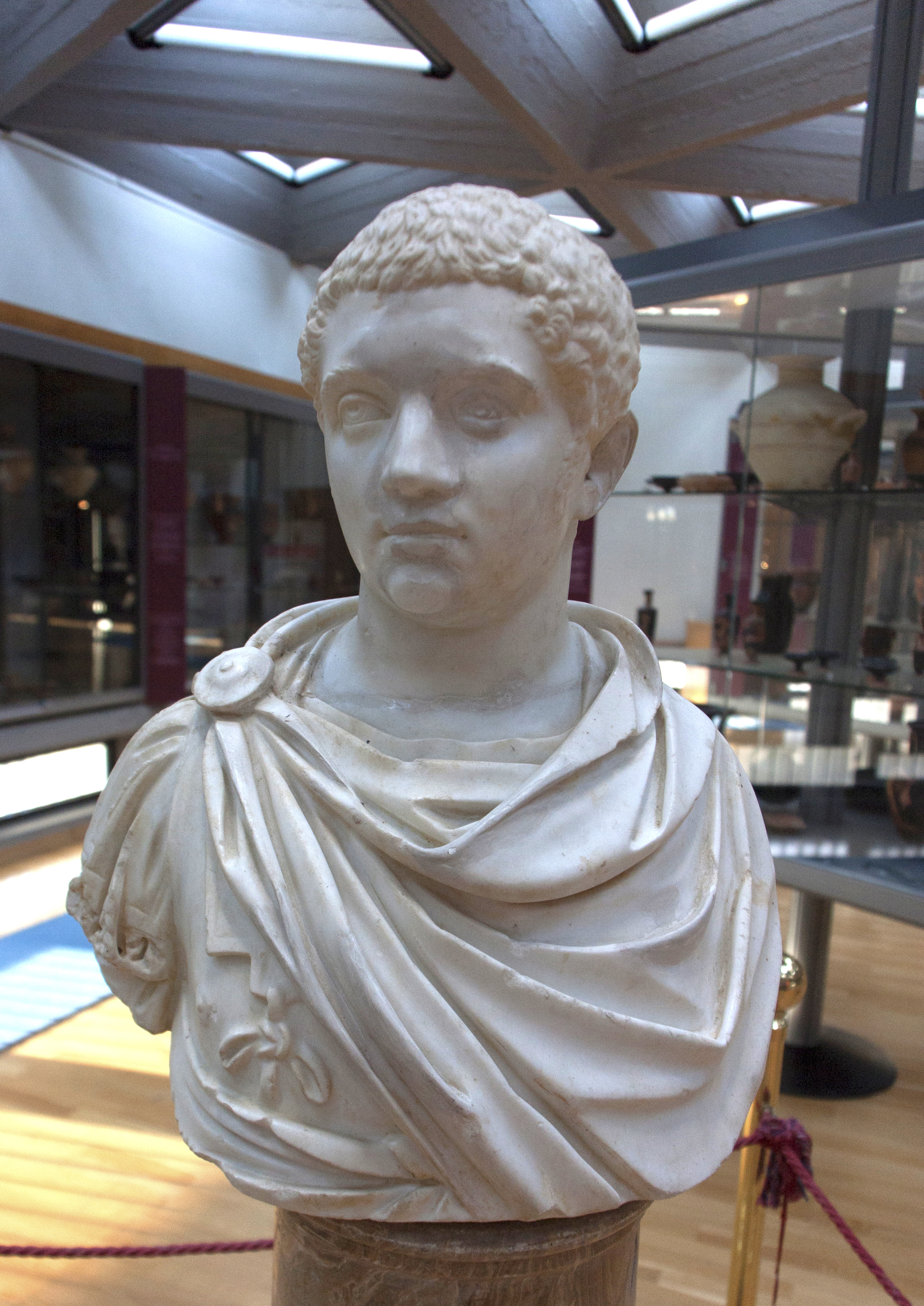
Rare bust of Emperor Geta (204-205 AD) found at the villa of Piano della Clesia

The archaeological park of Sabucina (officially, Sabbucina), located on the mountain of the same name near Caltanissetta (8 km to the north east), is an archaeological site in Sicily. The area contains settlements ranging from the Bronze Age (20th-16th century BC) to the Roman period.

Today the site is accessible as the regional archaeological park of Sabucina.

== History ==
The ancient city had pre-Greek origins; it was constructed by the Sicans, who took advantage of the dominant position of the mountain over the Salso river valley.

Archaeological evidence allows the phases of habitation to be divided as follows:

- 23rd-15th century BC: some villages of the Castelluccio culture
- 13th-10th century BC: village of huts of the northern Pantalica culture (threephases)
- 10th-9th century BC: slight habitation by the Cassibile culture
- 8th-7th century BC: new settlement with rectangular houses and an organised religious area
- 6th-4th century BC: settlement of Greek colonists from Gela.

=== Greek period ===
The first phase of the Greek settlement came in the 7th century. The centre consisted of rectangular habitations, with more space between them towards the summit of the mountain. In the 6th century BC, the city wall was built, which probably contained the entire inhabited area at that time. In the 5th century the settlement was destroyed, probably by Ducetius, who is mentioned by Diodorus Siculus.

Reconstruction occurred in the second half of the 5th century; the settlement received a new layout of streets and housing plots on a different orientation, and a new city wall with rectangular towers.

This settlement was abandoned in turn in 310 BC, probably by Agathocles of Syracuse.

=== Roman period ===
In Roman times, farms and villas were settled in the plain near Piano della Clesia and near the necropolis in the Lannari district.

The bust of emperor Geta was found here dated to 204-5 AD. It was probably produced in Rome and brought to Sicily by aristocratic owners of the villa. It is one of the few official busts of Geta that survive, as after his murder by his brother Caracalla in 212, his memory was obliterated under damnatio.

The land was probably owned from 350 AD by Philippianus judging from tile stamps from the villa of Piano della Clesia, as part of a latifundium farming estate which included the nearby Villa of Geraci.

== Archaeological area ==
In the area at the bottom of the mountain are some Bronze Age grotticella tombs; other important discoveries include to a hut used as a shrine and the so-called Sacello of Sabucina, a terracotta model dating to the 6th century BC, found in the area of the necropolis, which depicts a small temple with a pronaos in antis and a pitched roof surmounted by two figures of cavalrymen and two gorgoneion masks decorating the tympanum. The sacello, with other discoveries, is now kept in the Regional archaeological museum of Caltanissetta.

Starting from the 1960s Piero Orlandini excavated the late Bronze Age huts, dating to the 13th-10th centuries BC. This was an important excavation, since Sabucina was the first village of this type to be identified in Sicily.

== Bibliography ==
- La Rosa, Vincenzo (1989). "Le popolazioni della Sicilia: Sicani, Siculi, Elimi". Italia omnium terrarum parens. Milano: Libri Scheiwiller. Collana Antica Madre, XII. pp. 3–110.
- Rosalba Panvini (2009). La Sicilia in età arcaica: dalle apoikiai al 480 a.C. Centro regionale per l'inventario, la catalogazione e la documentazione. ISBN 978-88-903321-8-0.
- Filippo Giudice; Rosalba Panvini (2003). Il greco, il barbaro e la ceramica attica: immaginario del diverso, processi di scambio e autorappresentazione degli indigeni. L'erma di Bretschneider. p. 79. ISBN 978-88-8265-320-0.
- Francesco Carubia (2012). Sicani: il Minotauro, l'agenda rossa di Borsellino ed i sacri misteri. Youcanprint. pp. 73–. ISBN 978-88-6751-141-9.
- Tamar Hodos (2006). Local Responses to Colonization in the Iron Age Mediterranean. Routledge. p. 126. ISBN 978-1-134-18281-7.
- Robert Leighton (1999). Sicily Before History: An Archaeological Survey from the Palaeolithic to the Iron Age. Cornell University Press. pp. 284–. ISBN 0-8014-8585-1.
- Istituto per gli studi micenei ed egeo-anatolici (Italy) (1991). dal palazzo alla città : atti del Convegno Internazionale Roma, 14-19 Marzo 1988. Istituto per gli Studi Micenei ed Egeo-Anatolic.
- Marisa Sedita Migliore (1981). Sabucina: studio sulla zona archeologica di Caltanissetta. S. Sciascia.
- Caterina Barilaro (2004). I parchi letterari in Sicilia: un progetto culturale per la valorizzazione del territorio. Rubbettino Editore. pp. 165–. ISBN 978-88-498-0863-6.
- Guglielmo Capozzo (1840). Memorie su la Sicilia tratte dalle più celebri accademie e da distinti libri di società letterarie e di valent' uomini nazionali e stranieri, con aggiunte e note. pp. 200–.
