= Gino Vinicio Gentili =

Italian archaeologist (1914–2006)

Gino Vinicio Gentili (Osimo, 27 September 1914 – Bologna, 29 July 2006) was an Italian archaeologist.

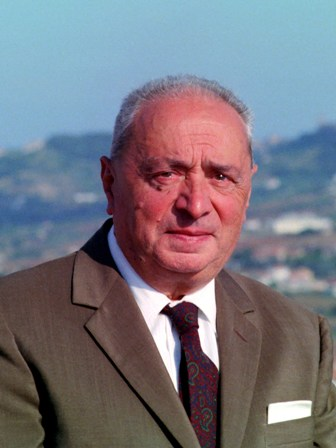
Gino Vinicio Gentili.

== Biography ==
He earned his degree in Fine Arts and Letters at the University of Rome La Sapienza and graduated in archaeology at the Italian School of Archaeology in Rome. He earned a doctorate in archaeology and in history of Greek and Roman arts, first at the University of Catania and later at the University of Bologna, where he taught etruscology and ancient Italy's art.

In 1945, he was elected mayor of Osimo. He was also an official in the administration of the Antiquities and Fine Arts of the Ministry of Education and Chief Inspector and Superintendent of Antiquities for Eastern Sicily (1946 to 1963) and for Emilia-Romagna. In 1973, he was awarded the Gold Medal of Civic Merit by the municipality of Osimo "for having paid tribute to the city with the brightest fame acquired in the field of archaeology, and especially for his valuable and irreplaceable contribution to the knowledge of the past in Osimo". In 1979, he retired from his official position but continued with his research.

== Major works and researches ==
In 1959–60, Gino Vinicio Gentili excavated a mosaic on the floor of the room, later dubbed the "Chamber of the Ten Maidens", at the Villa Romana del Casale near Piazza Armerina. Informally called "the bikini girls", the maidens appear in a mosaic artwork which scholars named "Coronation of the Winner". The young women perform sports including weight-lifting, discus throwing, running and ball games. A woman in a rich dress is depicted with a crown in her hand; one of the maidens holds a palm frond. The Villa in 1997 became a UNESCO World Heritage Site.

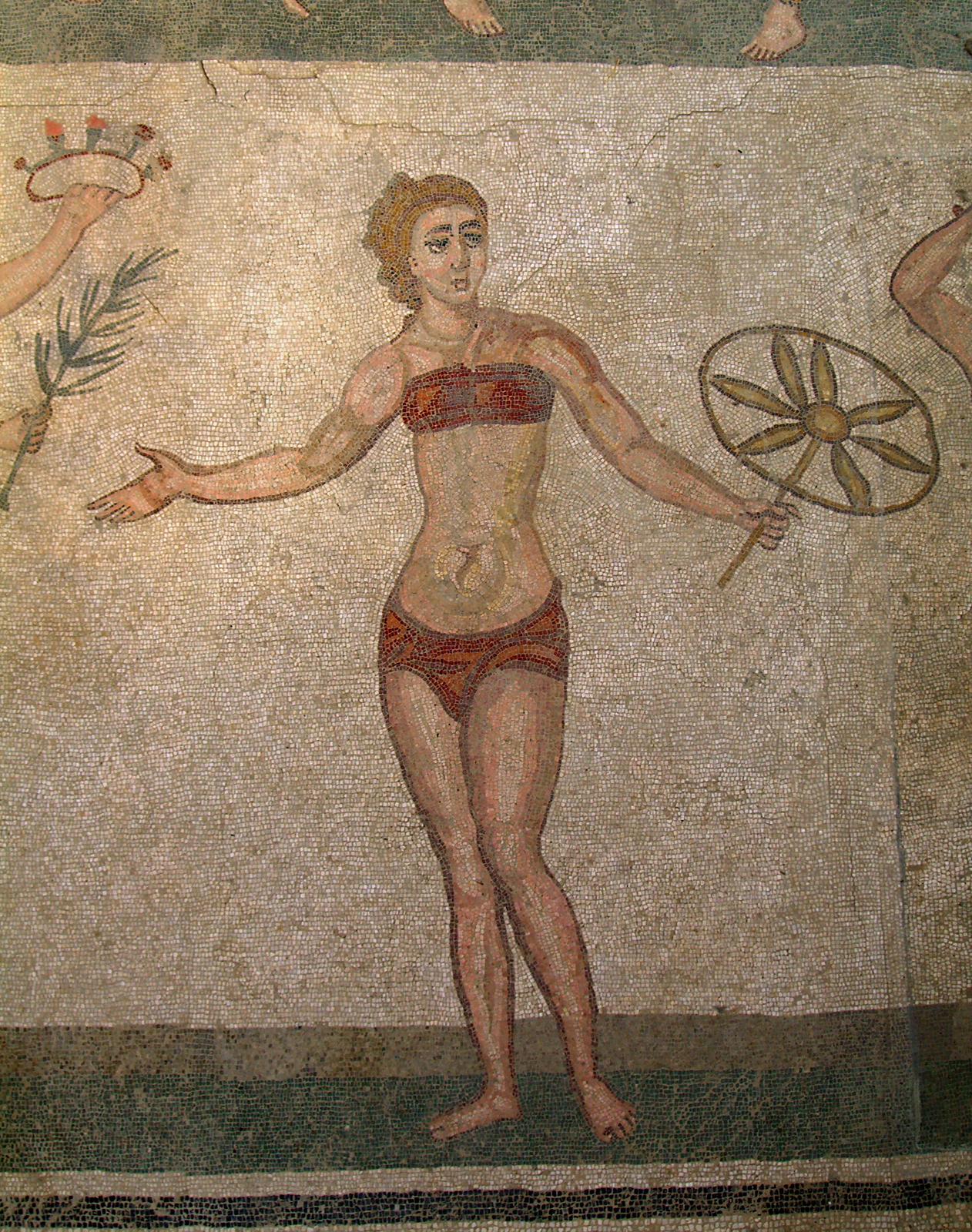
Detail of the "bikini girls" mosaic.

Explorations and archaeological research conducted by Gentili include:

- Identification of the great Ionic temple of Syracuse
- Researches in the Roman amphitheatre in Syracuse
- Discovery of a small Byzantine basilica at Santa Croce Camerina
- Exploration of archaic funerary monuments in Syracuse and recovery of the great statue of a "Mother" Kourotrophos in the site of Megara Hyblaea at Augusta
- Identification near Mineo of the ancient Sicilian center of Palikè
- Early excavations at Naxos, the first Greek colony in Sicily, near Messina
- Discovery of a Roman villa of the early Roman Empire in San Biagio di Castroreale Bagni
- Researches in the Etruscan town of Marzabotto
- Identification of the Etruscan town Spina in the province of Ferrara
- Discovery of valuable Roman mosaics in Faenza, Sarsina and Rimini and of remains of Byzantine basilicas in Ravenna.
- A series of excavations of prehistoric culture in Verucchio, recovering burial objects of Villanovan culture (8th–7th century B.C.) and others from the Sabellians (5th–4th century circa B.C.). He brought to light an exceptionally well-preserved artefact, the "throne" with scenes relating to the processing of wool, along with finely carved wooden items, now in the Museo Civico Archeologico di Bologna.

Gino Vinicio Gentili is the author of essays about his researches at Piazza Armerina, Verucchio, and Osimo.
