= Latifundio–minifundio land tenure structure =

Civil organization of Latin America

The land tenure of Latin America is called the 'Latifundio–minifundio' structure. This dualistic tenure system is characterized by relatively few large commercial estates known as latifundios, which are over 500 hectares and numerous small properties known as minifundios, which are under 5 hectares. Minifundios are mainly subsistence-oriented smallholdings and are generally farmed by peasant households. Latifundios relied mainly on peonage, which is a form of unfree labour or wage labor in which a laborer (peon) has little control over employment conditions, with features of feudal serfdom.
