= Latifundium =

Estate in antique and modern Rome

In Ancient Rome, a latifundium (pl. latifundia; from Latin: latus 'spacious' and fundus, 'farm, estate') was a great landed estate specializing in agriculture destined for sale: grain, or olive oil. They were characteristic of Magna Graecia and Sicily, Egypt, North Africa and Hispania Baetica. The latifundia were the closest approximation to industrialised agriculture in antiquity, and their economics depended upon slavery.

In the modern colonial period, the word was borrowed in Portuguese (latifúndios) and Spanish (latifundios or simply fundos) for similar extensive land grants, known as fazendas (in Portuguese) or haciendas (in Spanish), in their empires.

== Ancient Rome(long ago) ==
The basis of the latifundia notably in Magna Graecia (the south of Italy including Sicilia) and Hispania, was the ager publicus (state-owned land) that was confiscated from conquered people beginning in the 3rd century BC. As much as a third of the arable land of a new province was taken for agri publici and then divided up with at least the fiction of a competitive auction for leased estates rather than outright ownership.

Later, the practice of establishing agricultural coloniae, especially from the early 1st century BC, as a way to reward Roman army veterans created smaller landholdings, which would then be acquired by large landowners in times of economic distress. Such consolidation into fewer hands, mainly Roman patricians, was not universally approved of, but efforts to reverse the trend by agrarian laws were generally unsuccessful.

Later in the Roman Empire, as leases were inherited, ownership of the former common lands became established by tradition, and the leases became taxable. Ownership of land, organised in the latifundia, defined the Roman Senatorial class as it was their only socially acceptable source of wealth (as a result of the farmer-soldier tradition of Cinncinatus).

Latifundia included a villa rustica, including an often luxurious owner's residence, and the operation of the farm relied on a large number of slaves, sometimes kept in an ergastulum. They produced agricultural products for sale and profit such as livestock (sheep and cattle) or olive oil, grain, garum and wine. Nevertheless, Rome had to import grain (in the Republican period, from Sicily and North Africa; in the Imperial era, from Egypt).

The latifundia quickly started economic consolidation as larger estates achieved greater economies of scale and productivity, and senator owners did not pay land taxes. Owners re-invested their profits by purchasing smaller neighbouring farms, since smaller farms had lower productivity and could not compete, in an ancient precursor of agribusiness.

The latifundia distressed Pliny the Elder (AD 23/24 – 79) as he travelled, seeing only slaves working the land, not the sturdy Roman farmers who had been the backbone of the Republic's army. His writings can be seen as a part of the conservative reaction to the profit-oriented new attitudes of the upper classes of the Early Empire. He argued that the latifundia had ruined Italy and would ruin the Roman provinces as well. He reported that at one point, just six owners possessed half of the province of Africa, which may be a piece of rhetorical exaggeration as the North African cities were filled with many landowners who filled the town councils.

As small farms were bought up by the wealthy with their vast supply of slaves, the newly landless peasantry moved to the city of Rome, where they became dependent on state subsidies. Free peasants did not completely disappear. Many became tenants on estates that were worked in two ways: partly directly controlled by the owner and worked by slaves, and partly leased to tenants.

The production system of the latifundia went into crisis between the 1st and 2nd century as the supply of slaves dwindled due to lack of new conquests.

== Italy ==
In the 6th century, Cassiodorus was able to apply his own latifundia to support his short-lived Vivarium in the heel of Italy.

In Sicily, latifundia dominated the island from medieval times. They were only abolished by sweeping land reform mandating smaller farms in 1950–1962, funded from the Cassa per il Mezzogiorno, the Italian government's development fund for southern Italy (1950–1984).

== Examples of latifundia ==
- Villa Romana del Casale (Sicily)
- Villa Romana del Tellaro (Sicily)
- Villa of Geraci (Sicily)
- Villa Romana di Patti (Sicily)
- Villa dei Volusii (Rome)
- Settefinestre (Tuscany)
- Realmonte (Sicily)
- Villa of Casignana (Calabria)

== See also ==
- Agriculture in ancient Rome
- Agro-town – Town whose workforce's main occupation is agriculture
- Encomienda – Spanish labour system in its colonies
- Encomiendas in Peru
- Latifundio–minifundio land tenure structure – Civil organization of Latin America
- Plantation – Farm for cash crops
- Pronoia – Byzantine revenue system
- Sánchez Navarro latifundio – Former private estate in Mexico
