= Villa Romana del Casale =

World Heritage Site in Sicily

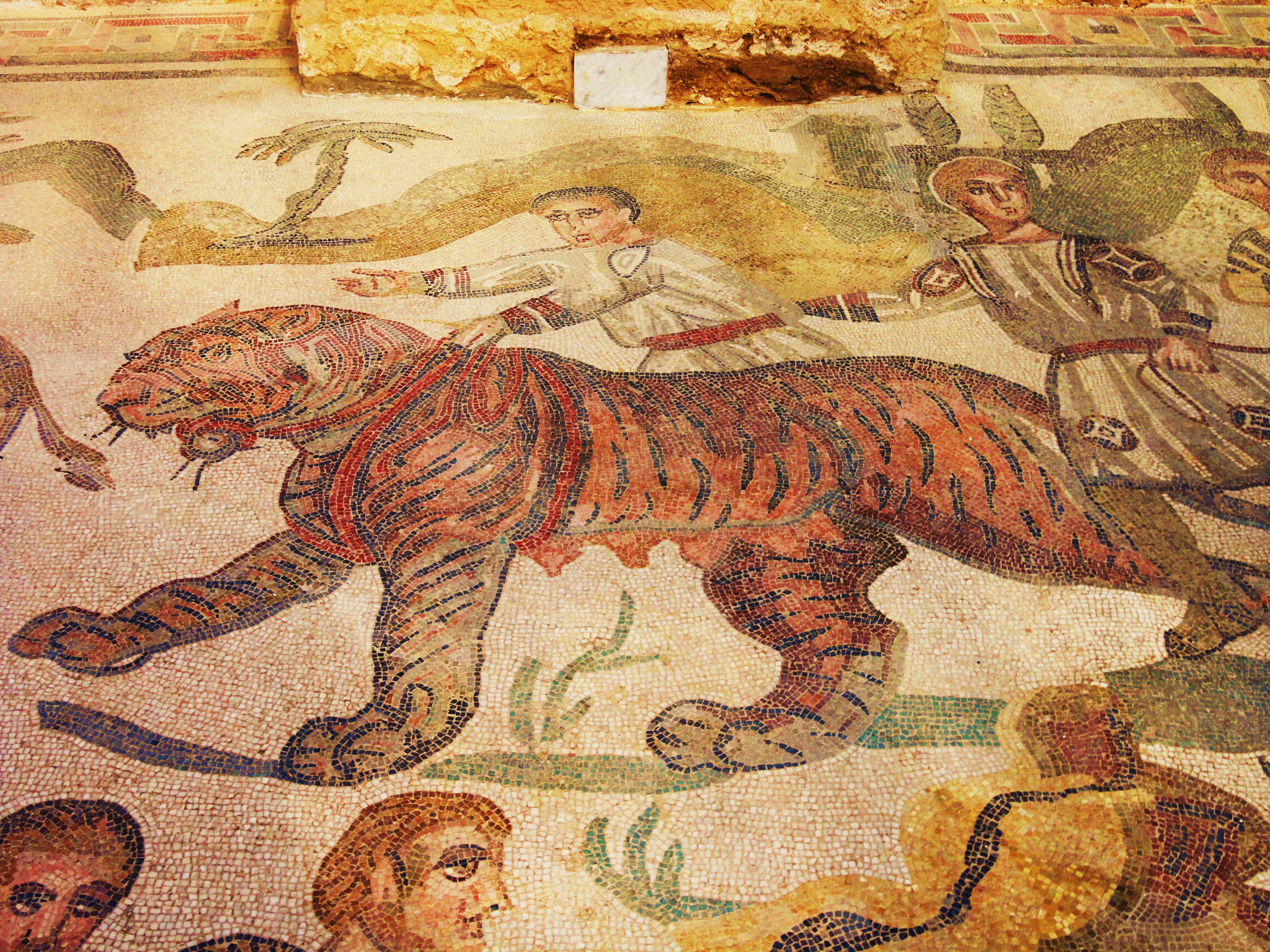
- A captive tigress in the big game hunt mosaic

- Location within Italy
- 37°21′53″N 14°20′05″E
- Type: Roman villa
- Periods: Late Antiquity to High Middle Ages
- Cultures: Roman
- Location: Piazza Armerina, Province of Enna, Sicily, Italy

History
- Built: First quarter of the 4th century
- Abandoned: 12th century AD

Site notes
- Area: 8.92 ha (22.0 acres)
- Archaeologists: Paolo Orsi, Giuseppe Cultrera, Gino Vinicio Gentili, Andrea Carandini
- Owner: Public
- Website: www.villaromanadelcasale.it

UNESCO World Heritage Site
- Official name: Villa Romana del Casale
- Type: Cultural
- Criteria: i, ii, iii
- Designated: 1997 (21st session)
- Reference no.: 832
- Region: Europe

The Villa Romana del Casale (Sicilian: Villa Rumana dû Casali) is a large and elaborate Roman villa or palace located approximately 3 km from the town of Piazza Armerina, Sicily. Excavations have revealed Roman mosaics that according to the Grove Dictionary of Art, are the richest, largest, and most varied collection that remains there, and for which the site was designated as a UNESCO World Heritage Site in 1997. The villa and its artwork date to the early fourth century AD.

The mosaic and opus sectile floors cover some 3,500 m^{2} and are unique in their excellent state of preservation, due to the landslide and floods that covered the remains.

Although less well-known, an extraordinary collection of frescoes covered not only the walls of the interior rooms, but also the exterior walls of the villa.

== History ==
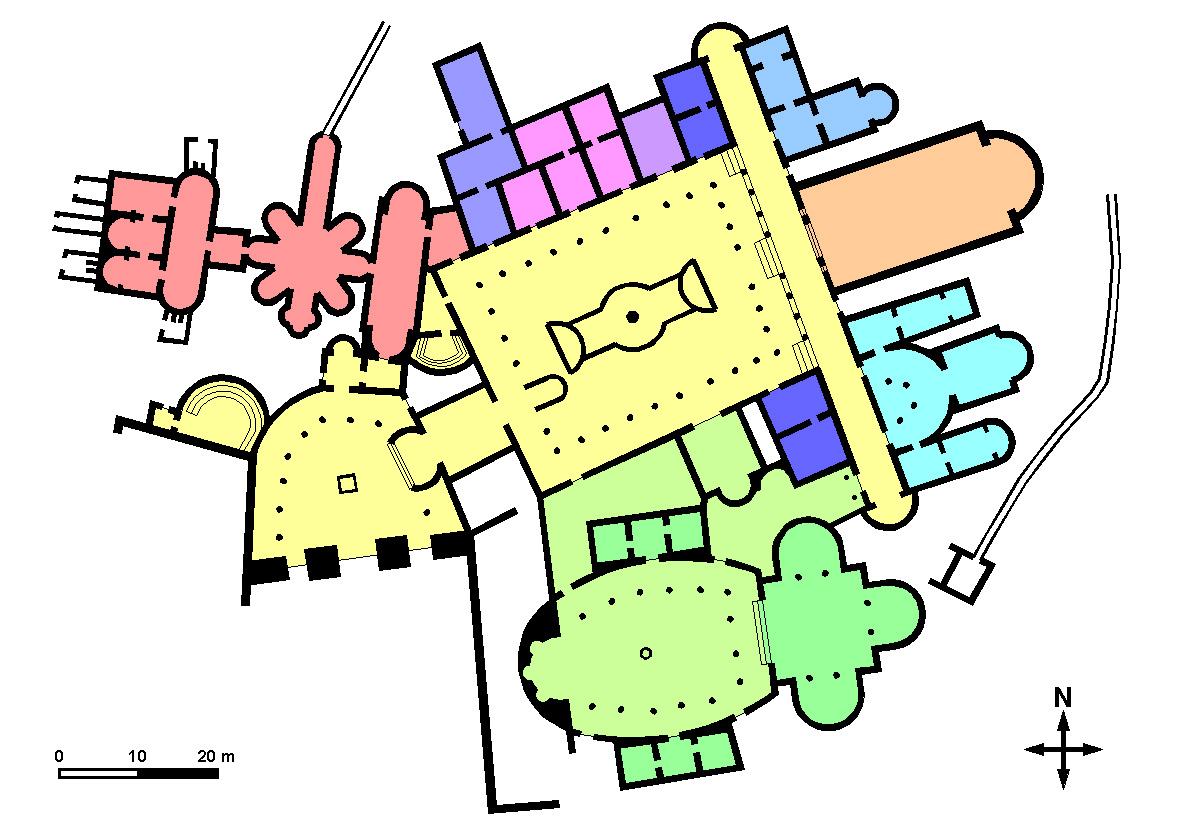
Plan of the villa

The currently visible remains of the villa were constructed in the first quarter of the fourth century AD on the remains of an older villa rustica and are the pars dominica, or master's residence, of a large latifundium or agricultural estate.

It is likely that the nearby settlement of Philosophiana was the centre of production and commercial activities, as well as a rest stop for travellers along the Catania-Agrigento road, as mentioned in the Itinerarium Antonini as a mansio or statio, for those seeking shelter for the night and a change of horses. The latifundium extended to the mouth of the Gela River that is identifiable by the many brick stamps with inscriptions PHIL SOPH.

During the first two centuries of the Roman Empire, Sicily had gone through an economic depression due to the production system of large estates based on slave labour: urban life had suffered a decline, the countryside was deserted, and the lack of suitable villas seems to indicate that the wealthy property owners did not reside there. Furthermore, the remote conquering Roman government neglected the territory that became a place of exile and a refuge for slaves and brigands.

At the beginning of the fourth century rural Sicily entered a new period of prosperity with commercial settlements and agricultural villages that seem to reach the apex of their expansion and activity. New constructions are seen in the localities of Philosophiana, Sciacca, Kaukana (Punta Secca), Naxos, and elsewhere. An obvious sign of transformation was the new title assigned to the governor of the island, from corrector to consularis.

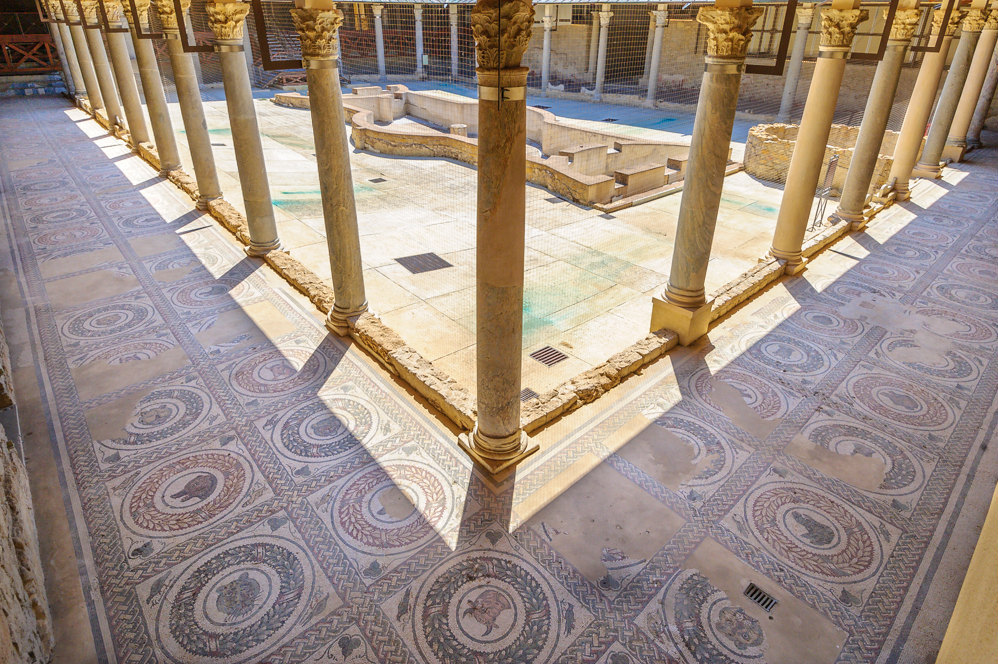
Peristyle

The reasons for the prosperity seem to be twofold. Firstly, the renewed importance of the provinces of proconsular Africa and Tripolitania for grain supplies to Italy, when Egyptian production, which had up to then satisfied the needs of Rome, was being sent to Constantinople, the new imperial capital from 330. Sicily consequently assumed a central role on the new trade routes from Africa to what now is the Italian peninsula. Secondly, the more affluent classes, of equestrian and senatorial rank, began to abandon urban life by retreating to their possessions in the countryside, due to the growing tax burden and the expenses they had to pay for city properties. The owners also looked after their own lands, which were no longer cultivated by slaves, but by colonists. Considerable sums of money were spent on enlarging, beautifying, and making the villas more comfortable (e.g. Villa Romana del Tellaro).

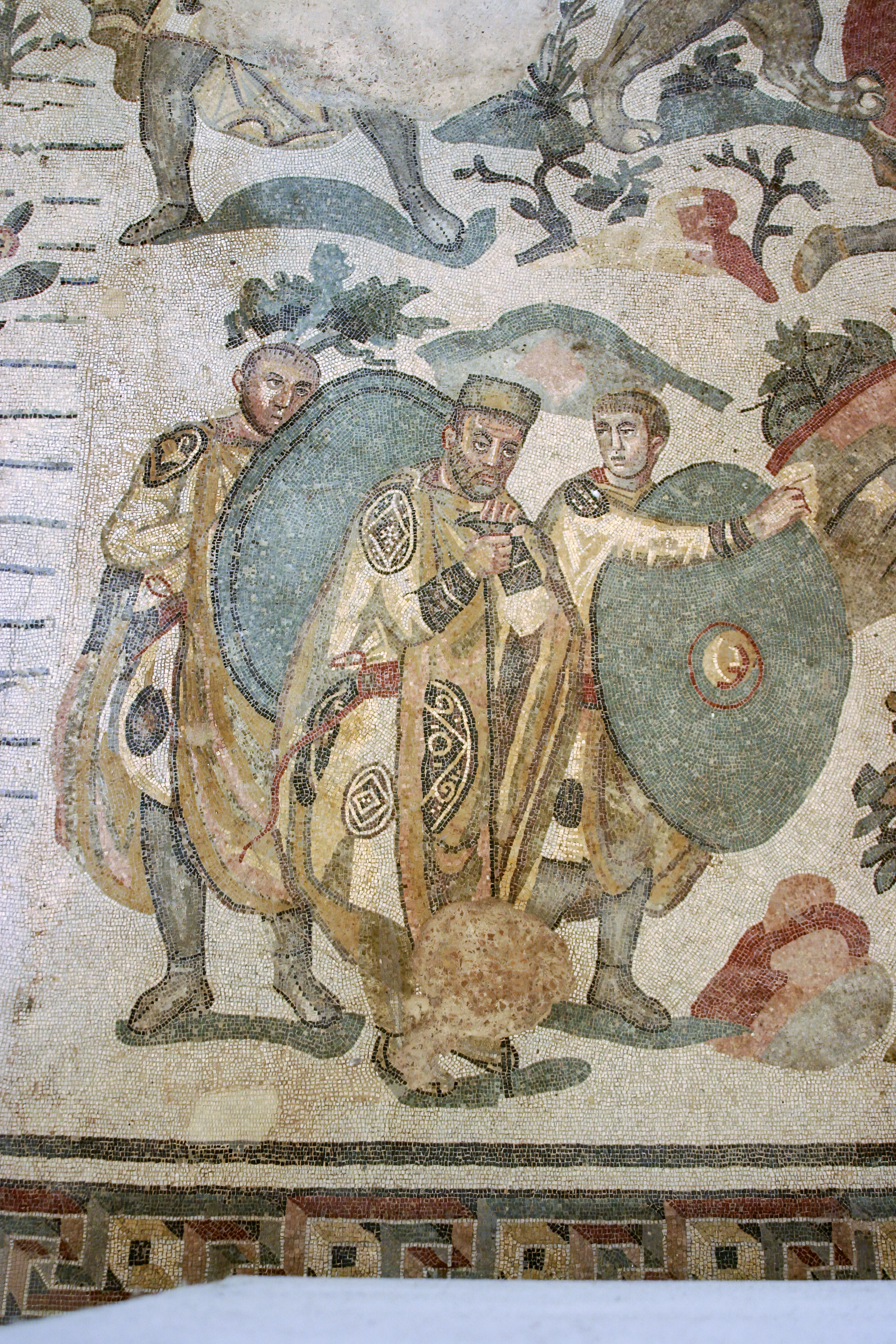
The central figure between two soldiers may be Maxentius, the possible owner of the villa.

The identity of the owner of the villa has long been debated and many different hypotheses have been formulated. Some features such as the Tetrarchic military insignia and the probable Tetrarchic date of the mosaics have led scholars to suggest an imperial owner such as Maximian. Other scholars believe that the villa was the centre of the great estate of a high-level senatorial aristocrat.

Three successive construction phases have been identified; the first phase involved the quadrangular peristyle and the facing rooms. The private bath complex was then added on a north-west axis. In a third phase, the villa took on a public character: the baths were given a new entrance and a large latrine. A grand monumental entrance was built, off-axis to the peristyle, but aligned with the entrance to the new baths in a formal arrangement with the elliptical (or ovoid) arcade and the grand tri-apsidal hall. This hall was used for entertainment and relaxation for special guests and replaced the two state halls of the peristyle (the “hall of the small hunt” and the “diaeta of Orpheus”). The basilica was expanded and decorated with beautiful and exotic marbles.

The complex remained inhabited for at least 150 years. A village grew around it that was entitled Platia (derived from the word palatium (palace).

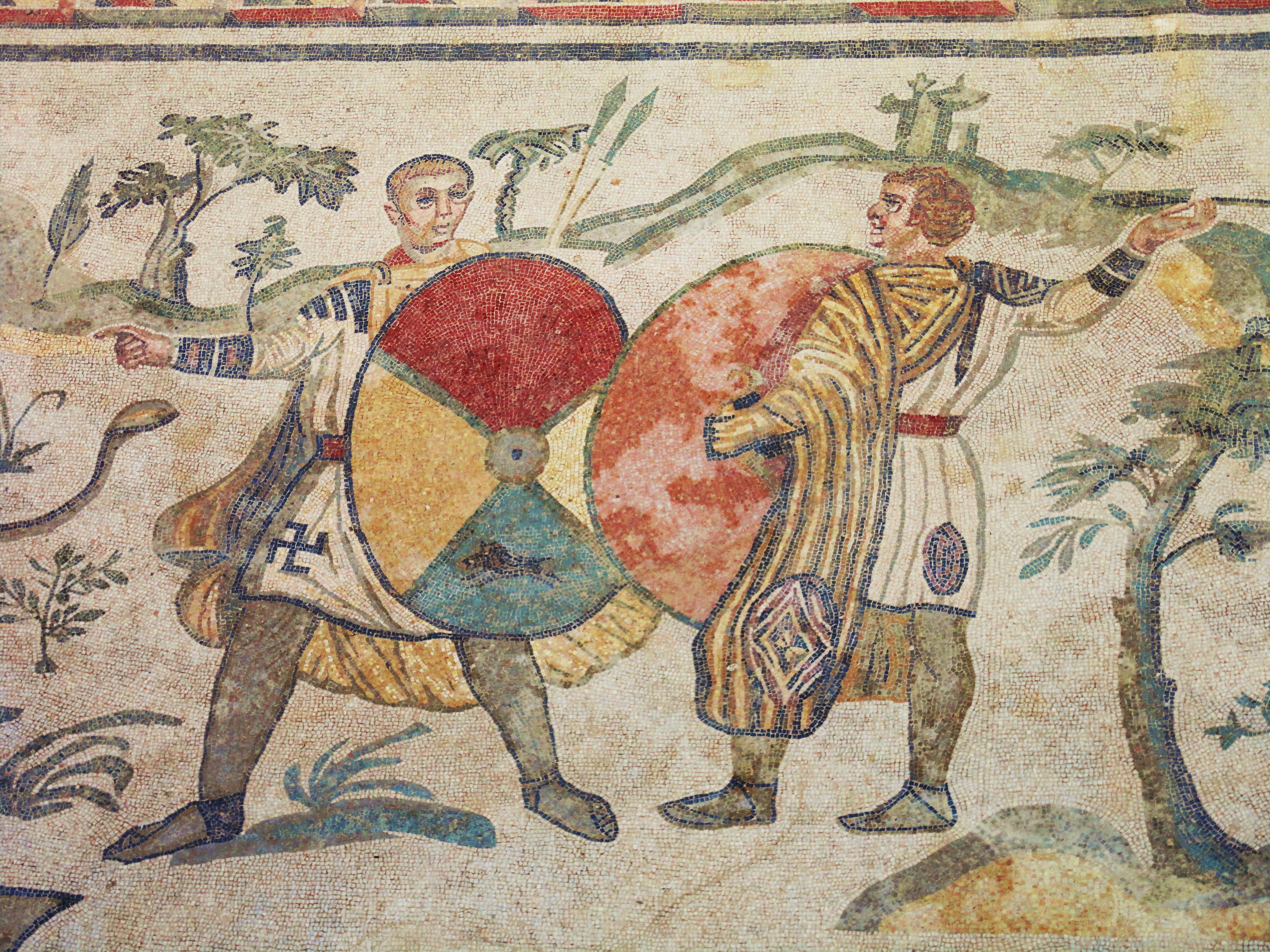
Hunters in the Great Hunt mosaic

In the fifth and sixth centuries, the villa was fortified for defensive purposes by thickening the perimeter walls and closing of the arcades of the aqueduct to the baths. The villa was damaged and perhaps, destroyed during the short invasion and domination by the Vandals between 469 and 478. The outbuildings remained in use, at least in part, during the Byzantine and Arab periods. The settlement was destroyed in 1160–1 during the reign of William I.

The site was abandoned in the twelfth century after a landslide covered the villa. Survivors moved to the current location of Piazza Armerina. Although some of the tallest parts of the remains of the villa remained visible above ground, it was almost entirely forgotten. The area was cultivated for crops.

Early in the nineteenth century, pieces of mosaics and some columns were found. The first official archaeological excavations were carried out later in that century.

The first professional excavations were made by Paolo Orsi in 1929, followed by the work of Giuseppe Cultrera in 1935–39. Major excavations took place in the period 1950–60 that were led by Gino Vinicio Gentili, after which a protective cover was built for the mosaics. In the 1970s Andrea Carandini carried out excavations at the site. Work has continued to the present day by the University of Rome, La Sapienza. In 2004 a large mediaeval settlement of the tenth–twelfth centuries was discovered. Since then, further sumptuous rooms of the villa have been revealed as well.

== The latifundium and the villa ==
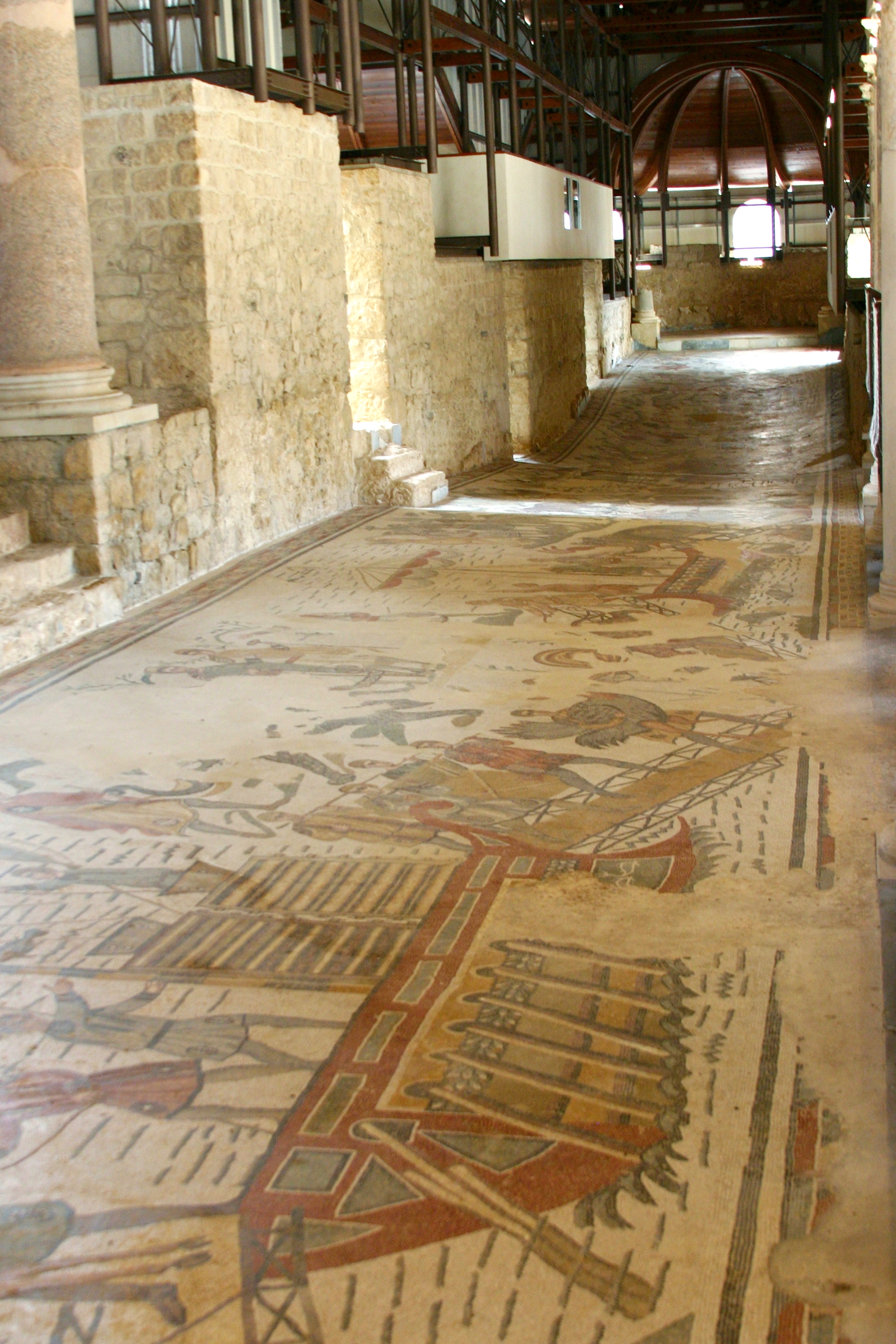
Ambulatory of the Big Game Hunt

In late antiquity the Romans partitioned most of the Sicilian hinterland into huge agricultural estates entitled latifundia. The size of the villa and the amount and quality of its artwork indicate that it was the pars dominica of such a latifundium. The commercial part of the villa, or pars rustica, of the latifundium is most likely centred on the nearby settlement of Philosophiana, 6 km away and cited in the Itinerarium Antonini. However, to the west of the entrance area a room divided in three parts by pillars for storage of agricultural products is related to agriculture.

The villa was so large as to include multiple reception and state rooms, which reflects the need to satisfy a number of different functions and to include spaces for the management of the estate, as well as of the villa. This transformed the villa into resembling a miniature city. The villa would likely have been the permanent or semi-permanent residence of the owner; it would have been where the owner received local clients in the role of patron.

The villa was a single-story building, centred on the peristyle, around which almost all the main public and private rooms were organised. The monumental entrance is via the atrium from the west. Thermal baths are located to the northwest; service rooms and probably guest rooms to the north; private apartments and a huge basilica to the east; and rooms of unknown purpose to the south. Somewhat detached, and appearing almost as an afterthought, is the separate area to the south containing the elliptical peristyle, service rooms, and a huge triclinium (formal dining room).

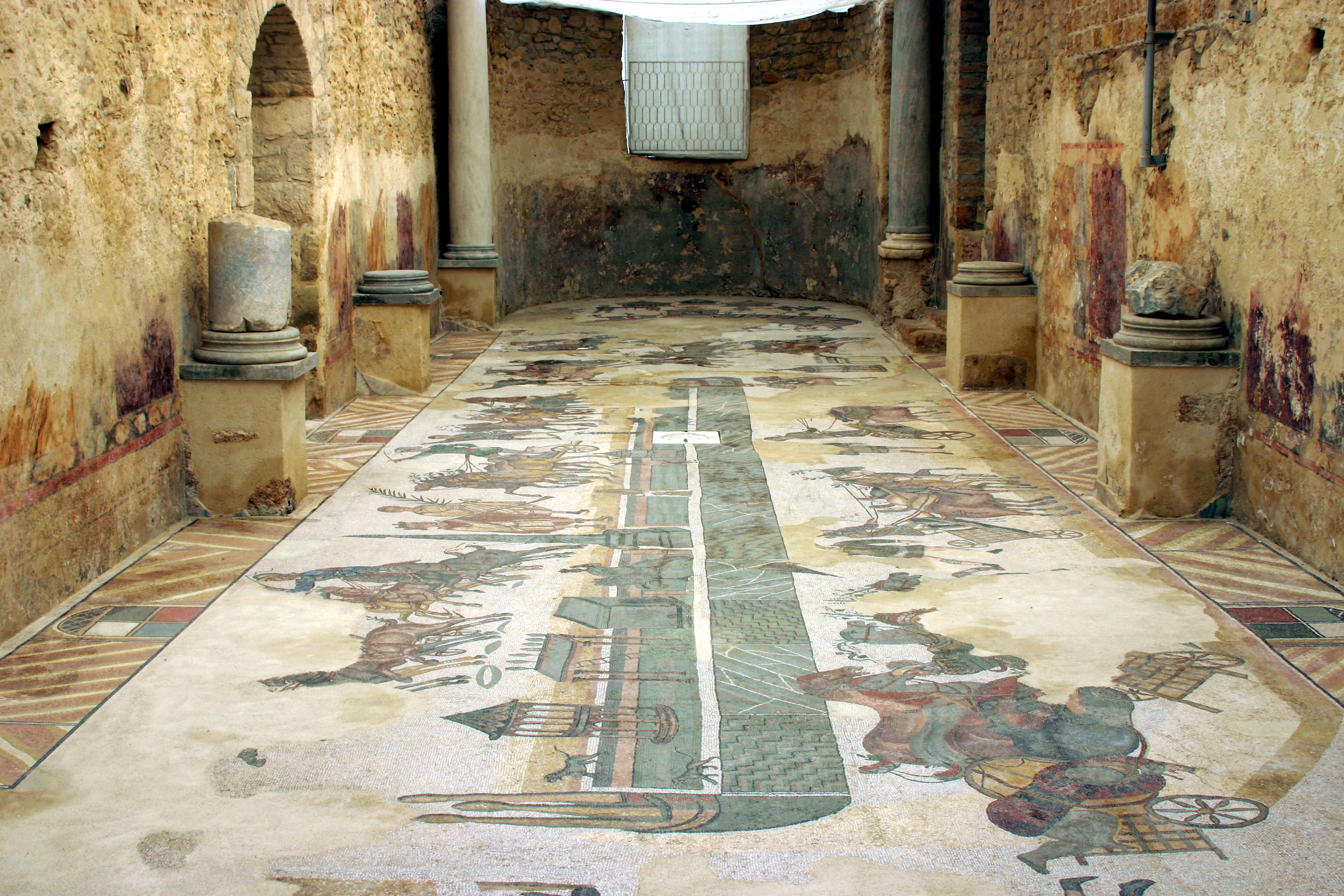
Palaestra - Two apses room

The overall plan of the villa was dictated by several factors: older constructions on the site, the slight slope of the site, and the paths of the sun and prevailing winds. The higher ground to the east is occupied by the Great Basilica, the private apartments, and the Corridor of the Great Hunt; the middle ground by the Peristyle, guest rooms, the entrance area, the Elliptical Peristyle, and the triclinium; while the lower ground to the west is dedicated to the thermal baths.

The whole complex is organised atypically along three major axes; the primary axis is the (slightly bent) line that passes from the atrium, tablinum, peristyle, and the great basilica (coinciding with the path visitors would follow). The division into three distinct nuclei and materially divided allowed separate uses without the risk of confusion or indiscretions. However, all the axes converge at the centre of the quadrangular peristyle and despite the asymmetries of the villa the result in an organic and unitary project that starting from the models of private buildings of the time (peristyle villa with apsidal hall and triclinium), introduced a series of variations to give originality and extraordinary monumentality to the entire complex. The unity of the building is evidenced as well by the functionality of the internal paths and the subdivision between public and private parts.

The succession from the entrance of vestibule-court-narthex-apsidal hall, already in use during the courtly architecture of the lower Empire (such as the palace of Constantine in Trier), with a notable interchangeability, also was used in construction of Christian basilicas (e.g. basilica of St. Peter in the Vatican) of the period.

Little is known about the earlier villa, but it appears to have been a large country residence probably built around the beginning of the second century.

Recent excavations have found a second bath complex close to the storerooms at the entrance that dates to the late antique phase and shows rare wall mosaics belonging to a basin or a fountain.

=== Monumental Entrance ===
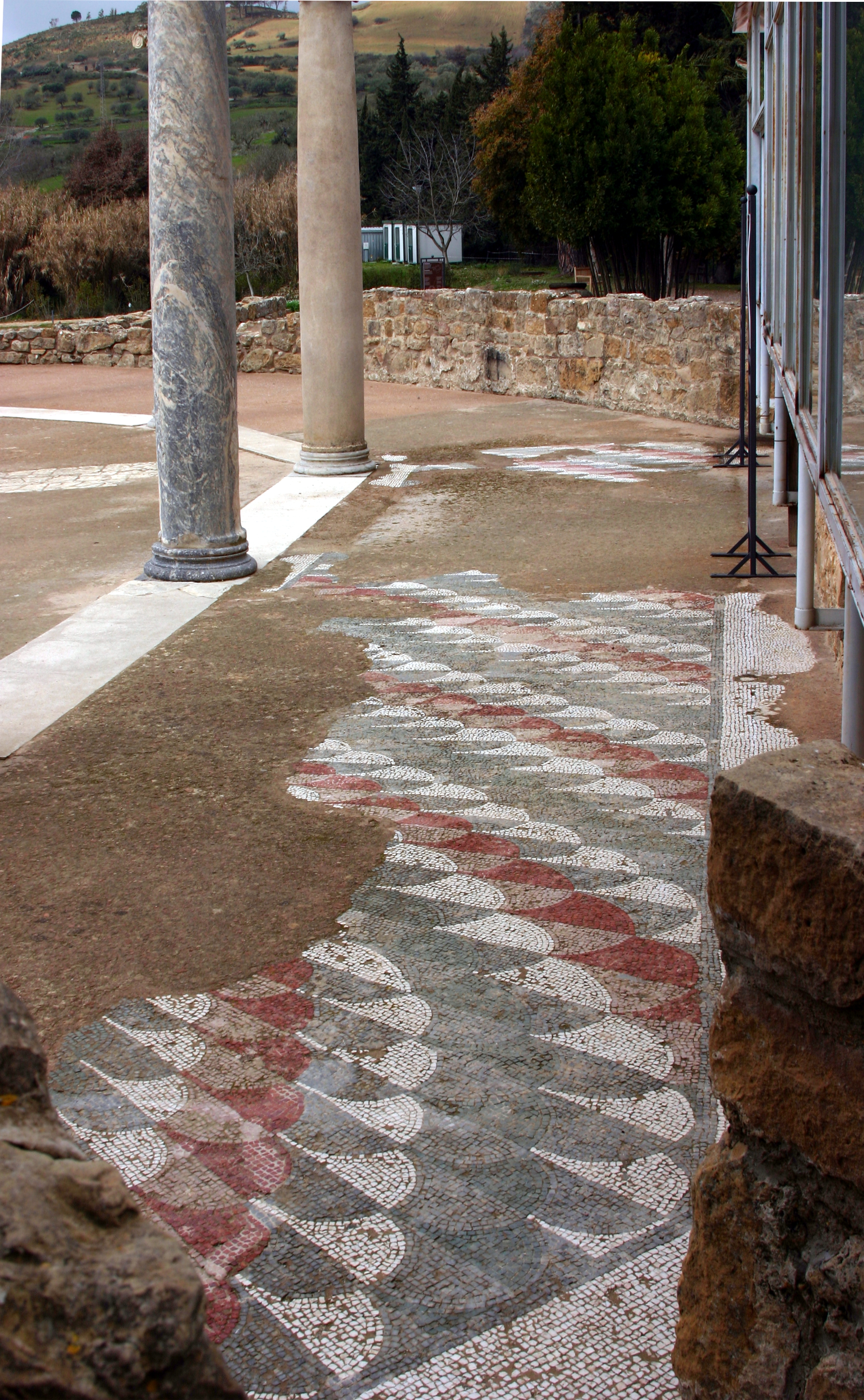
Polygonal court mosaic

Access to the villa was through a three-arched gateway, decorated with fountains and military paintings, and closely resembling a triumphal arch. This led to the horseshoe courtyard surrounded by marble columns with Ionic capitals and a square fountain at the centre. On the western side of the courtyard was a latrine and separate access was given to the baths and to the rest of the villa.

=== The peristyle garden and the southern rooms ===
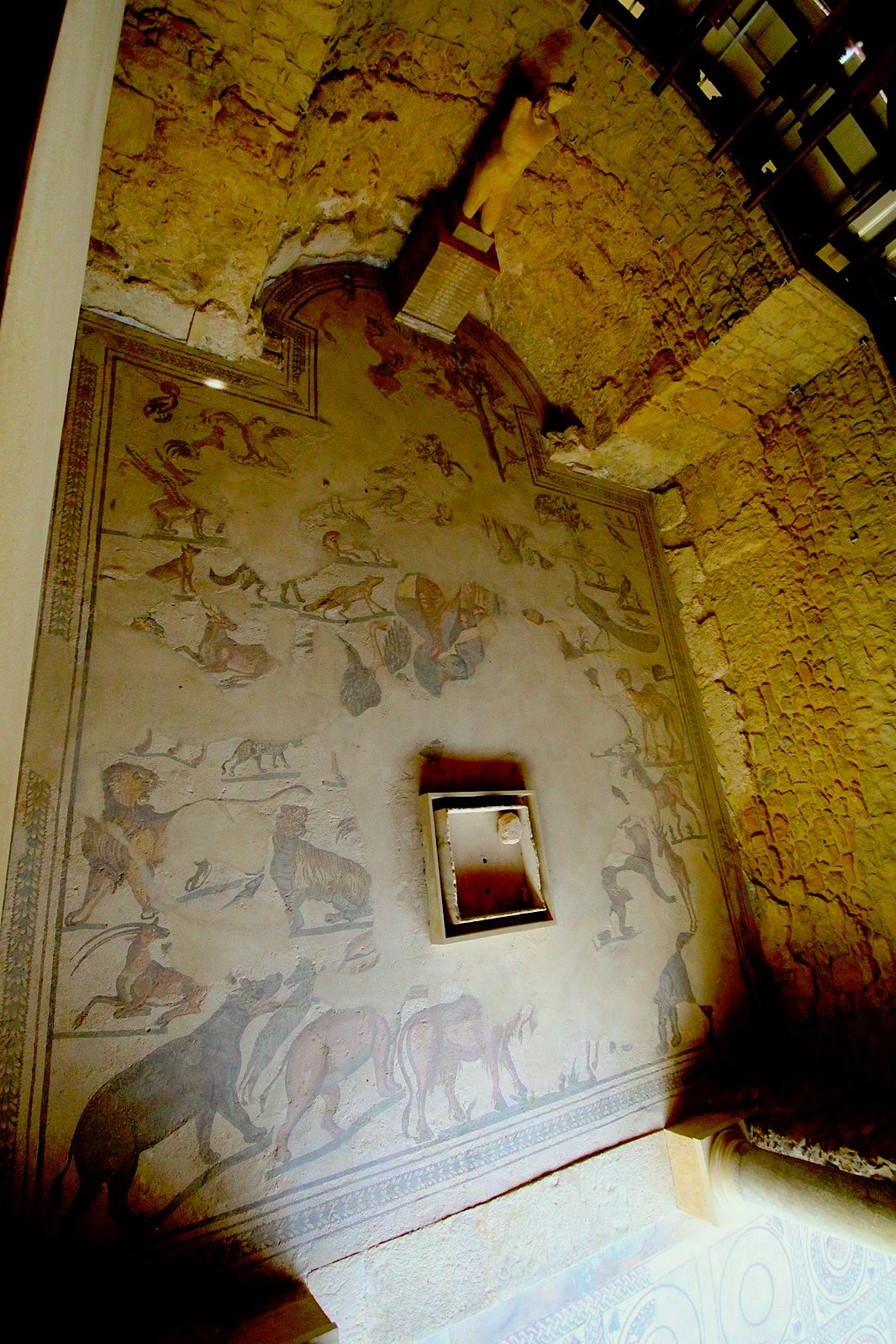
Diaeta of Orpheus, with an Orpheus mosaic

The elegant peristyle garden is decorated with a three-basin fountain, in the centre of which decoration featuring fish swimming among the waves may be seen. Rooms 33 and 34 were dedicated to service functions and have mosaics with geometric motifs. Room 34 also features a mosaic installed above the original floor showing women in athletic competitions that led excavators to entitle it “the room of the palestriti”.

Also on the southern side is the room they entitled diaeta of Orpheus, an apsidal room adorned with a remarkable Orpheus mosaic. It shows Orpheus playing the lyre beneath a tree and taming many kinds of animals with his music, a typical motif for the mythological subject. It is likely that this room was used as a summer dining room or, considering its floor subject, for the enjoyment of music.

=== The Basilica ===
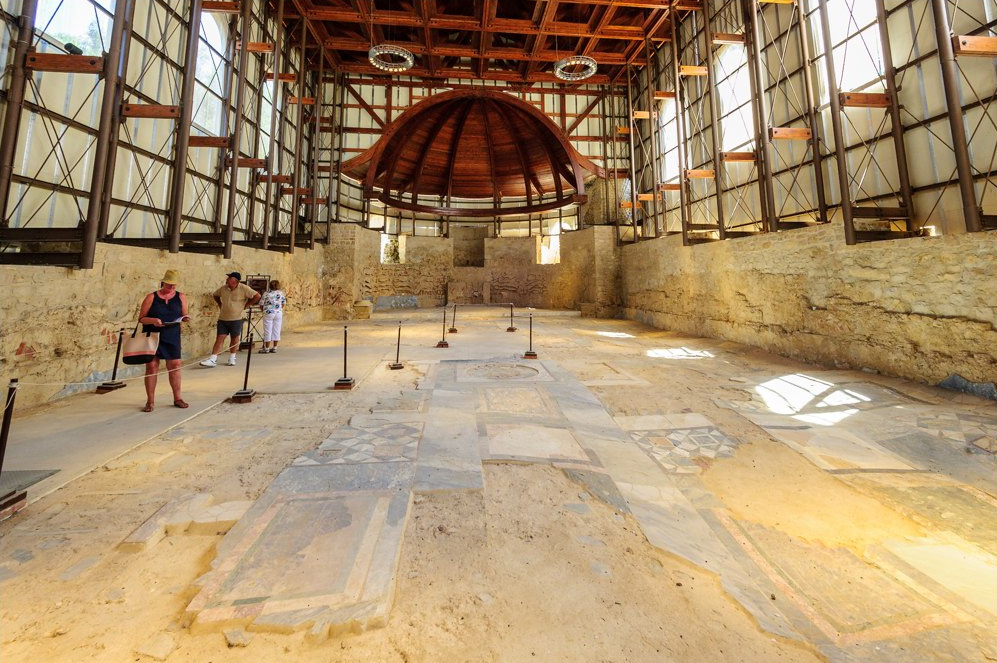
Basilica with marble panels

The grand apsidal hall of the villa was an audience hall and its most formal room that was accessed through a grand monumental entrance divided by two columns of pink Egyptian granite. An elaborate polychrome opus sectile floor consisting of marbles coming from around the Mediterranean lies at the entrance and is the richest decoration in the villa; it also covered the walls.

The excavations revealed that the apse vault was decorated with glass mosaics.

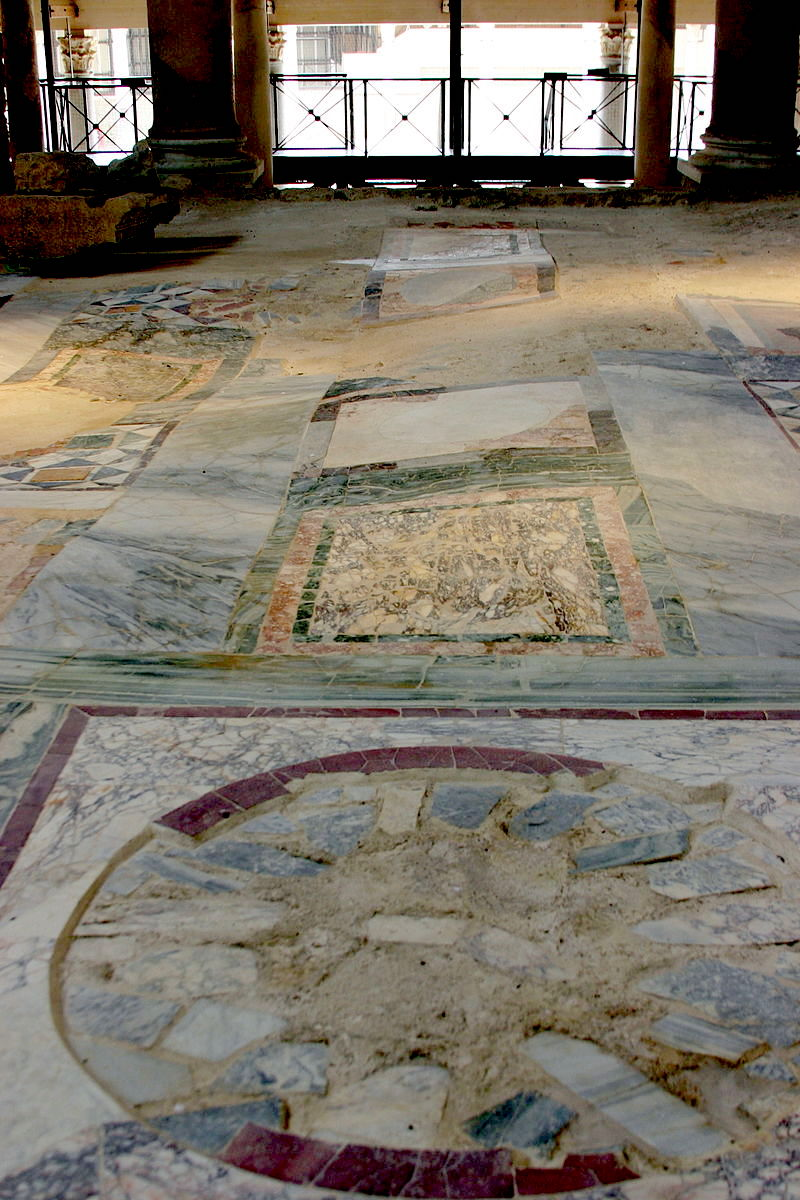
Opus sectile floor - Basilica

=== Triclinium and elliptical peristyle ===
On the south side of the villa is an elliptical peristyle, the Xystus, with a semi-circular nymphaeum on the western side. In the open courtyard were fountains spurting from the mosaic pavement.

The Xystus forms an introduction to the luxurious tri-apsidal triclinium, the great hall that opens to the east. This contains a set of mosaics dominated in the centre by the enemies encountered by Hercules during his twelve labours. In the north apse is his apotheosis crowned by Jupiter, while to the east are the Giants with serpentine limbs and in their death throes, having been struck by Hercules’ arrows. In the south apse is the myth of Lycurgus who tried to kill the nymph Ambrosia, but instead, was encircled by grapevines and attacked by a crowd of Maenads.

== Mosaics ==
=== Women's athletic competition ===
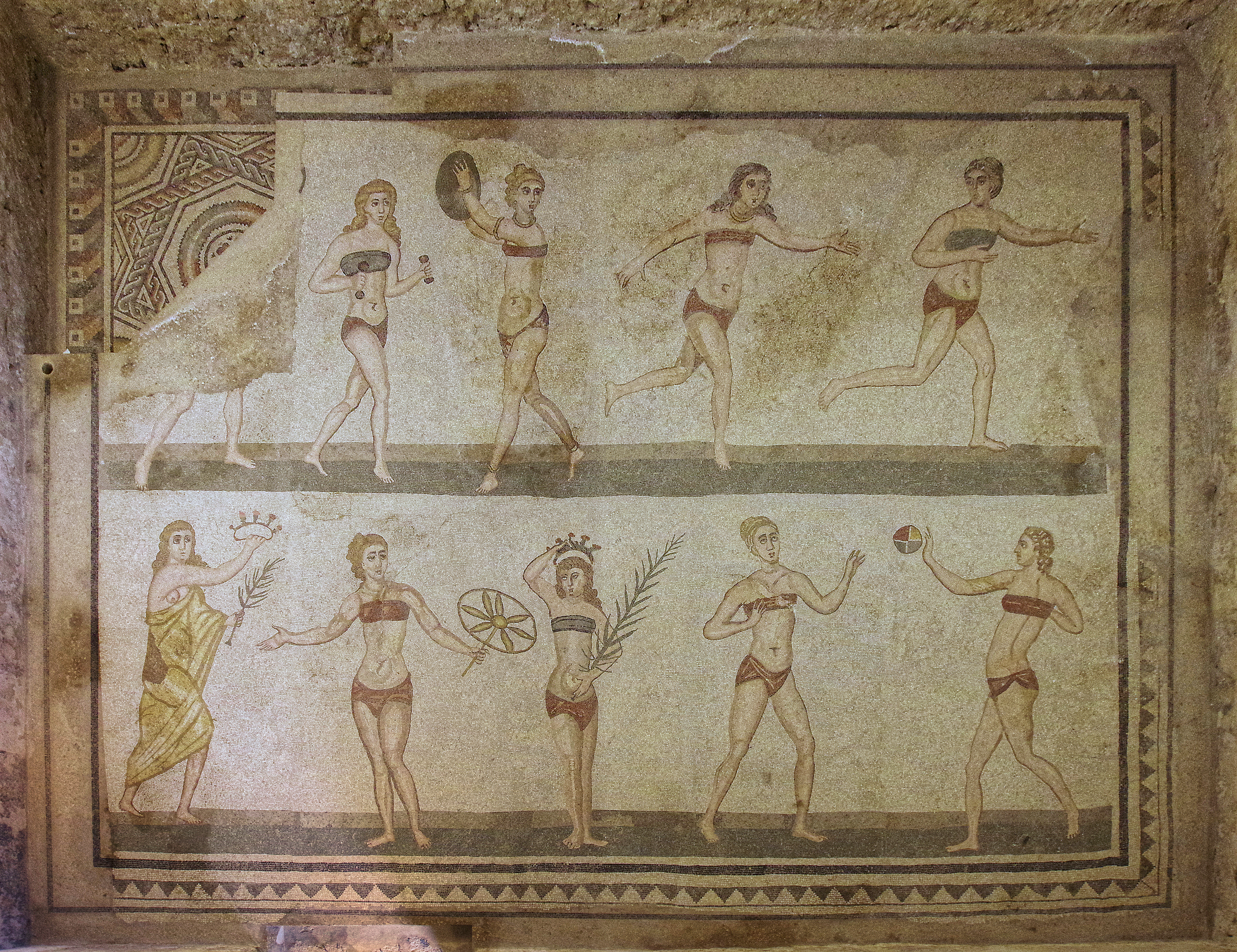
The villa has one of the earliest known images of bikini-type garments.

In 1959–60, Gentili excavated a mosaic on the floor of a room variously identified then as the "Room of the Gymnasts" and the "Chamber of the Ten Maidens" (Sala delle Dieci Ragazze in Italian). The subjects of the artwork appear in a mosaic that scholars have named Coronation of the Winner. Several women athletes are shown competing in sports that include weight-lifting, discus throwing, running, and ball-games. An official on the bottom left who is shown wearing a toga holds the trophies that she will award to the victor (a crown and a palm frond), and in the centre of the mosaic the victor appears with her crown and the palm frond. Much attention has been given to the two-piece sport or exercise outfits worn by the women, which closely resemble modern-day swimsuits.

=== The Little Hunt ===
Another well-preserved mosaic shows a hunt, that includes men hunting with dogs to capture a variety of game.

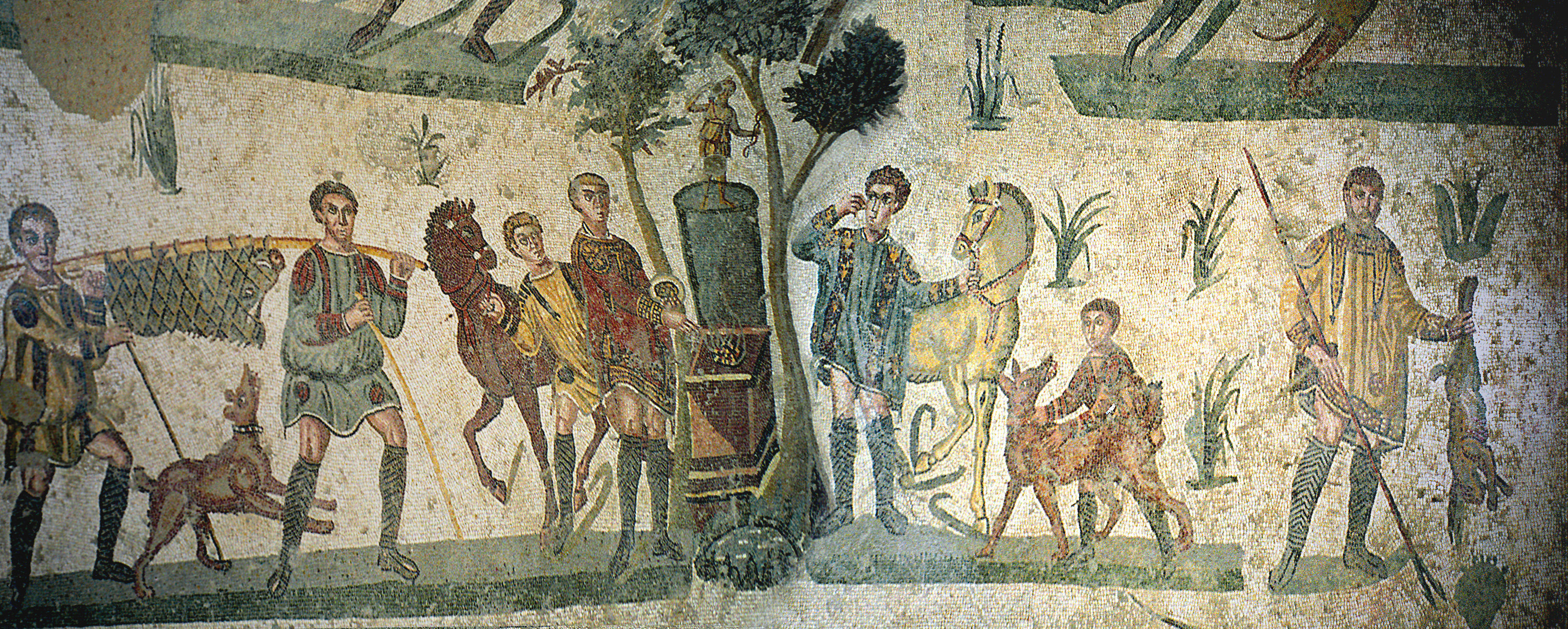
The Little Hunt mosaic [detail]

== Gallery ==
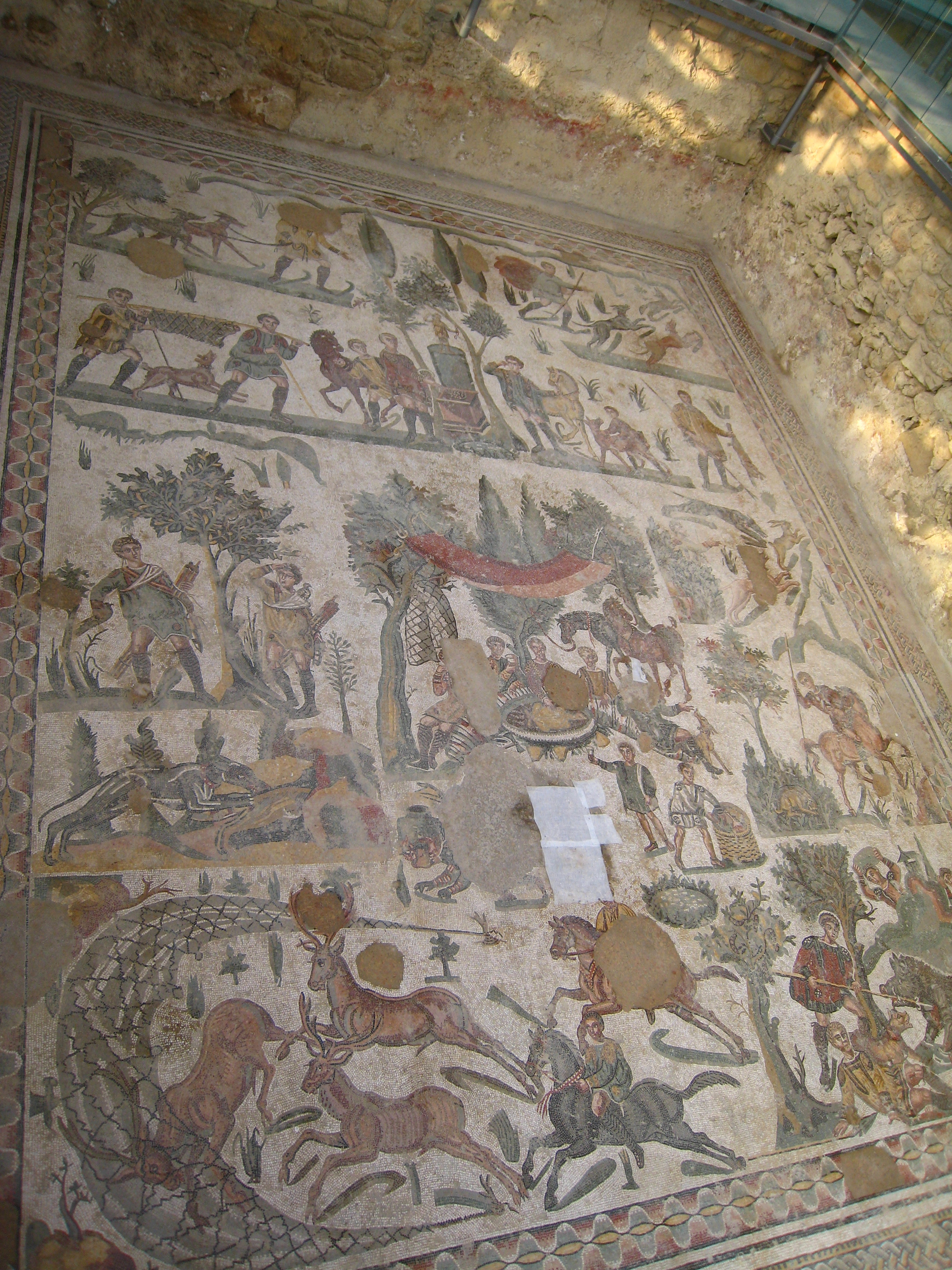
The Small Game Hunt mosaic

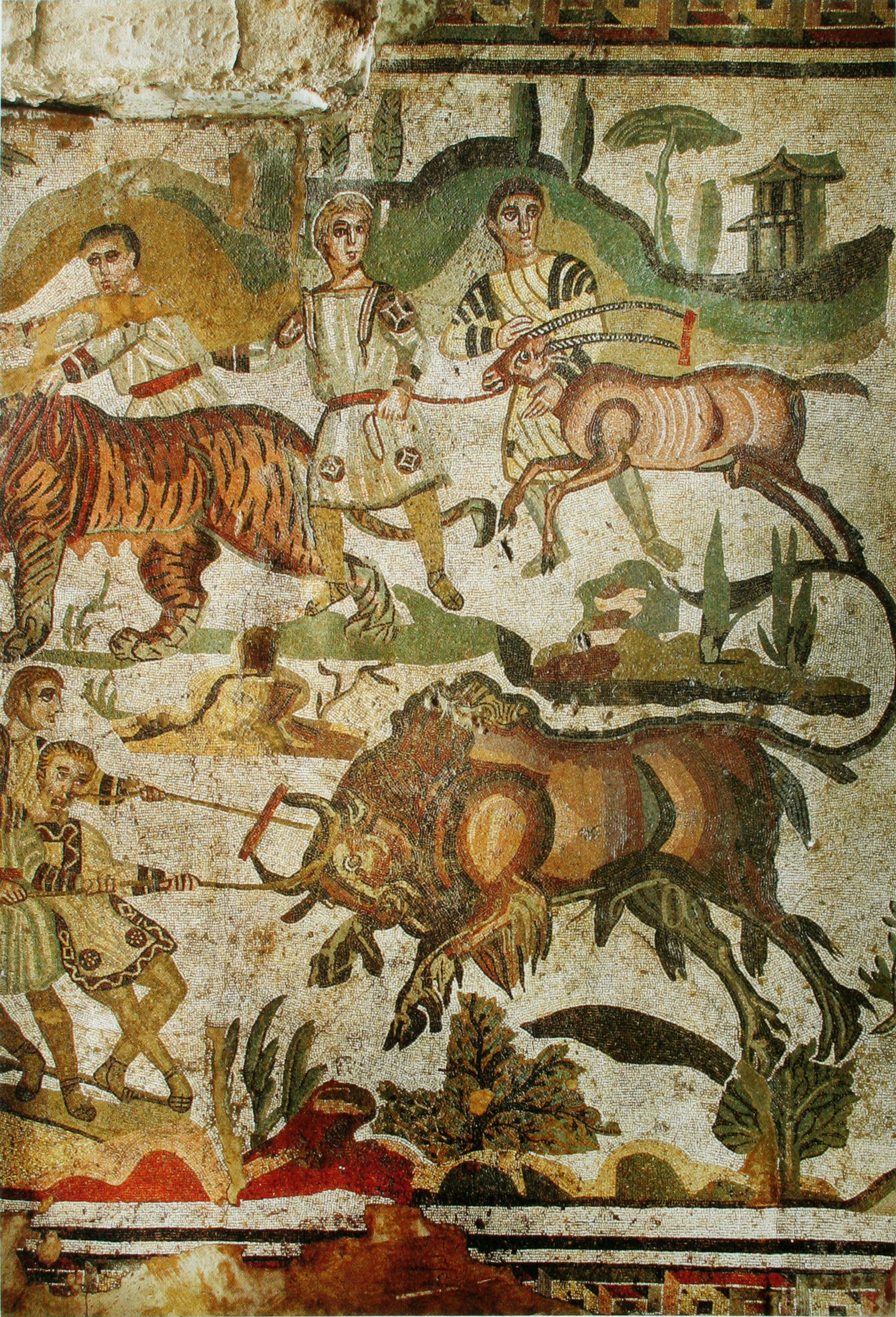
Great Hunt mosaic

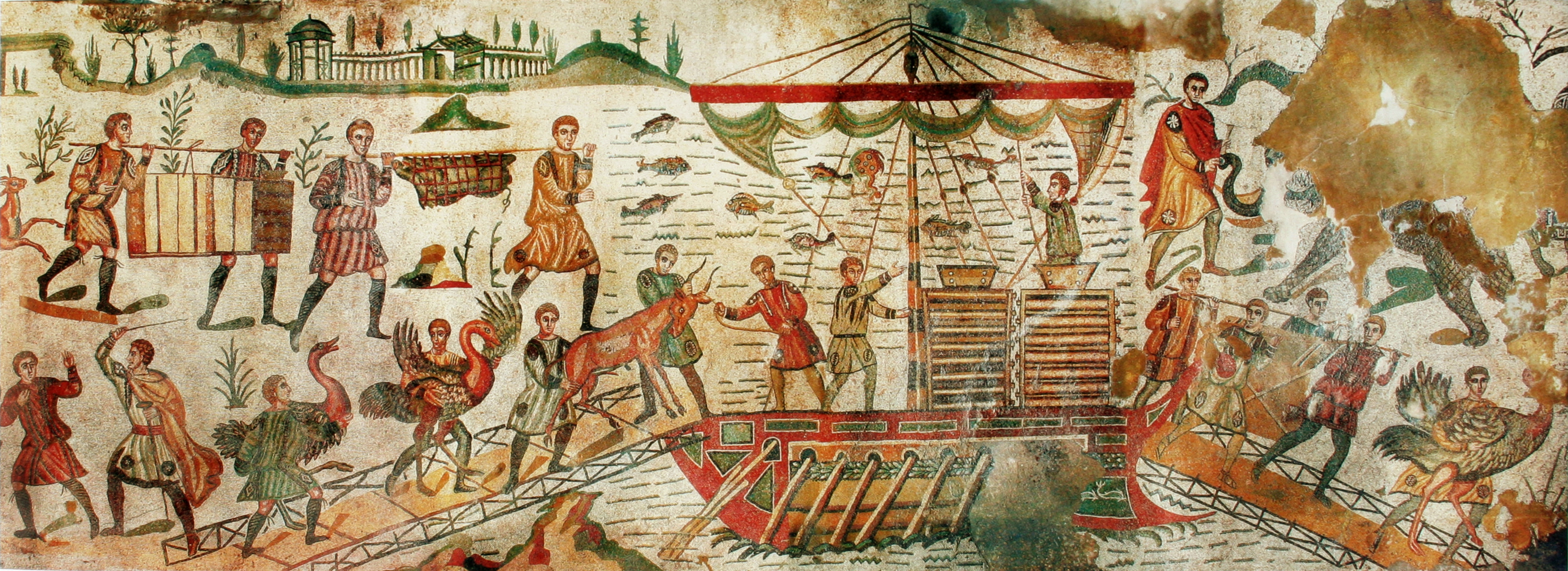
Great Hunt mosaic depicts the capture and transportation of animals

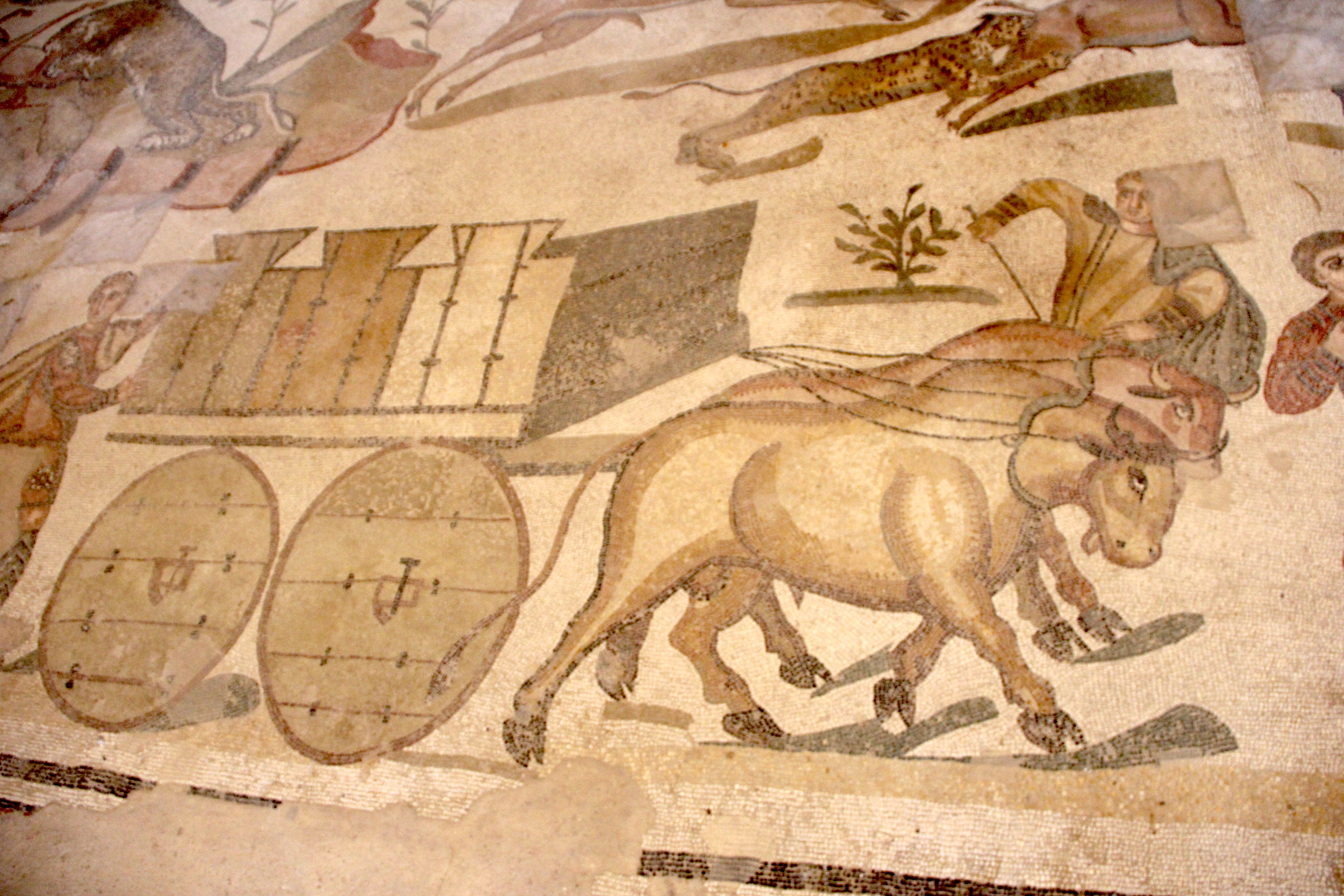
Oxen hauling caged prey

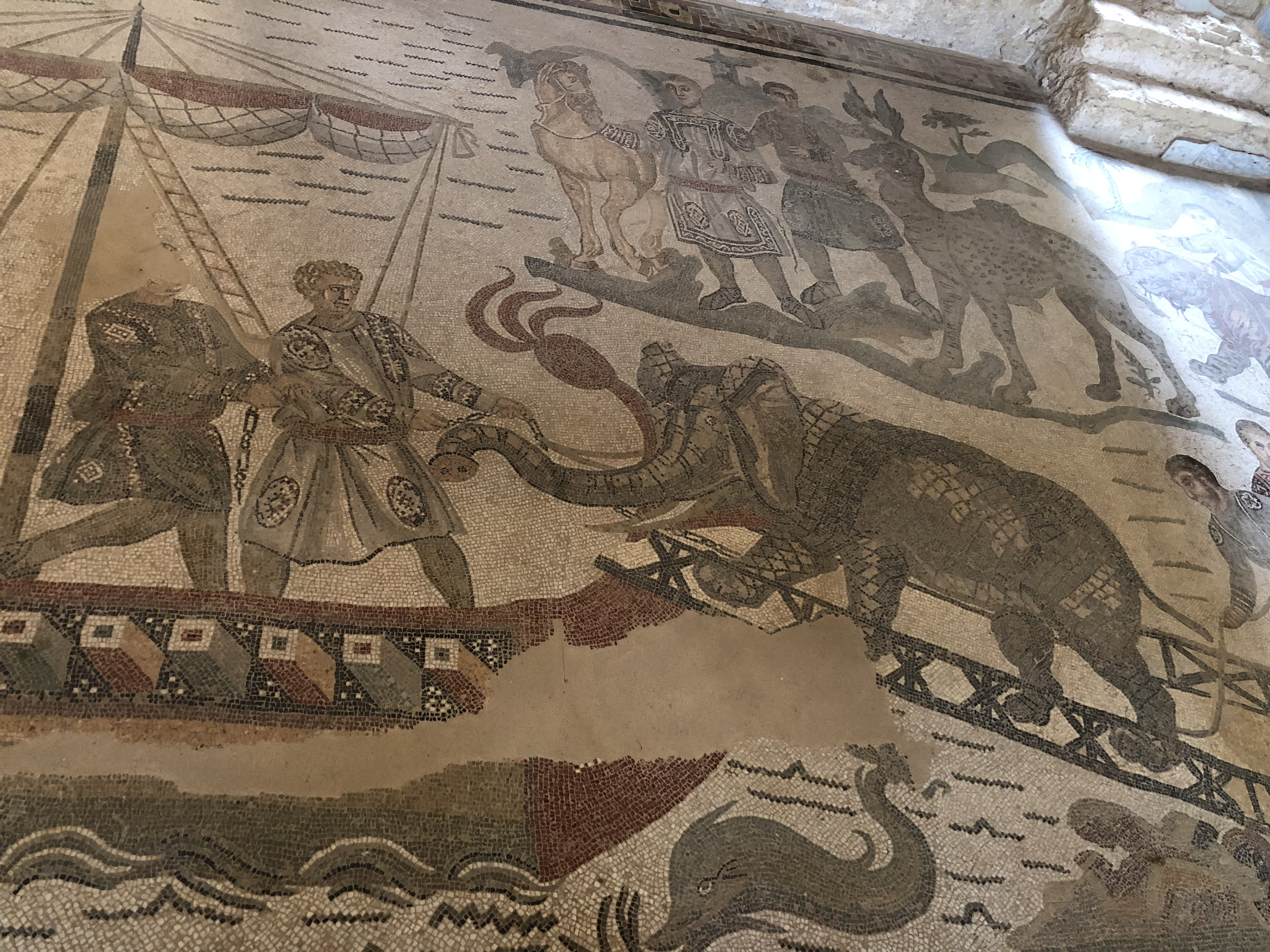
Elephant being loaded onto ship

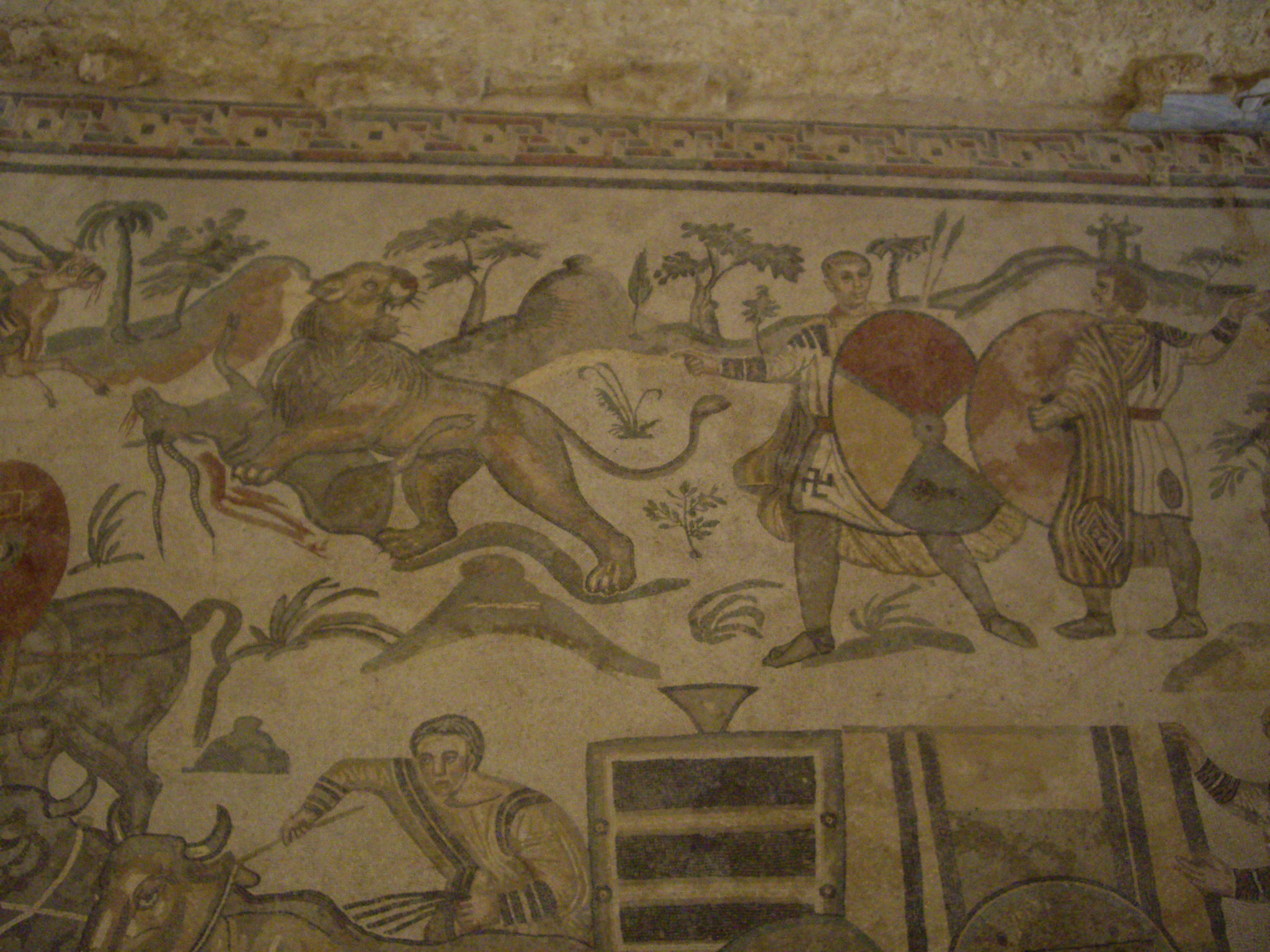
Hunting lioness with her prey being pointed out

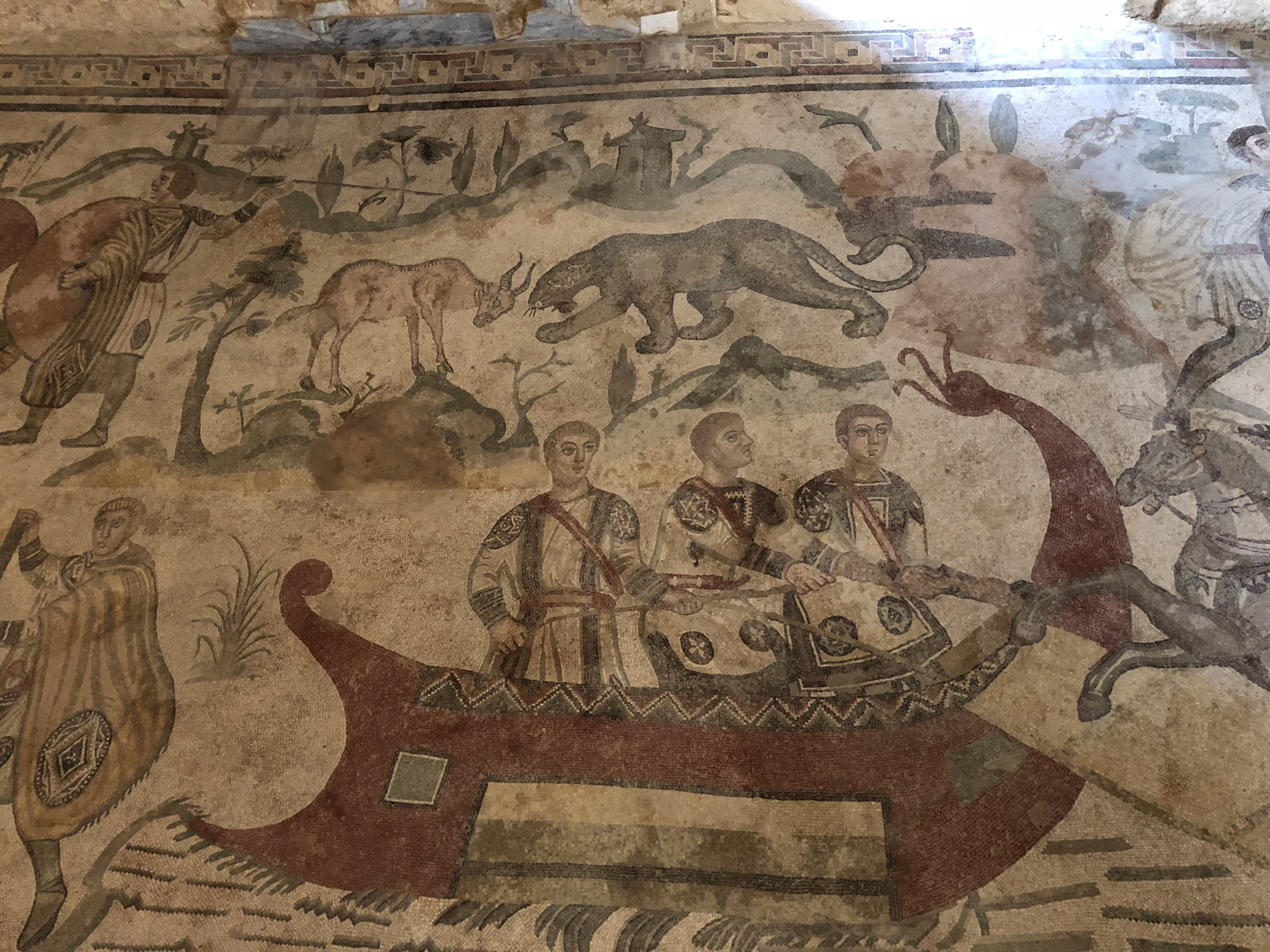
Supervisors on a ship below a lioness stalking her prey

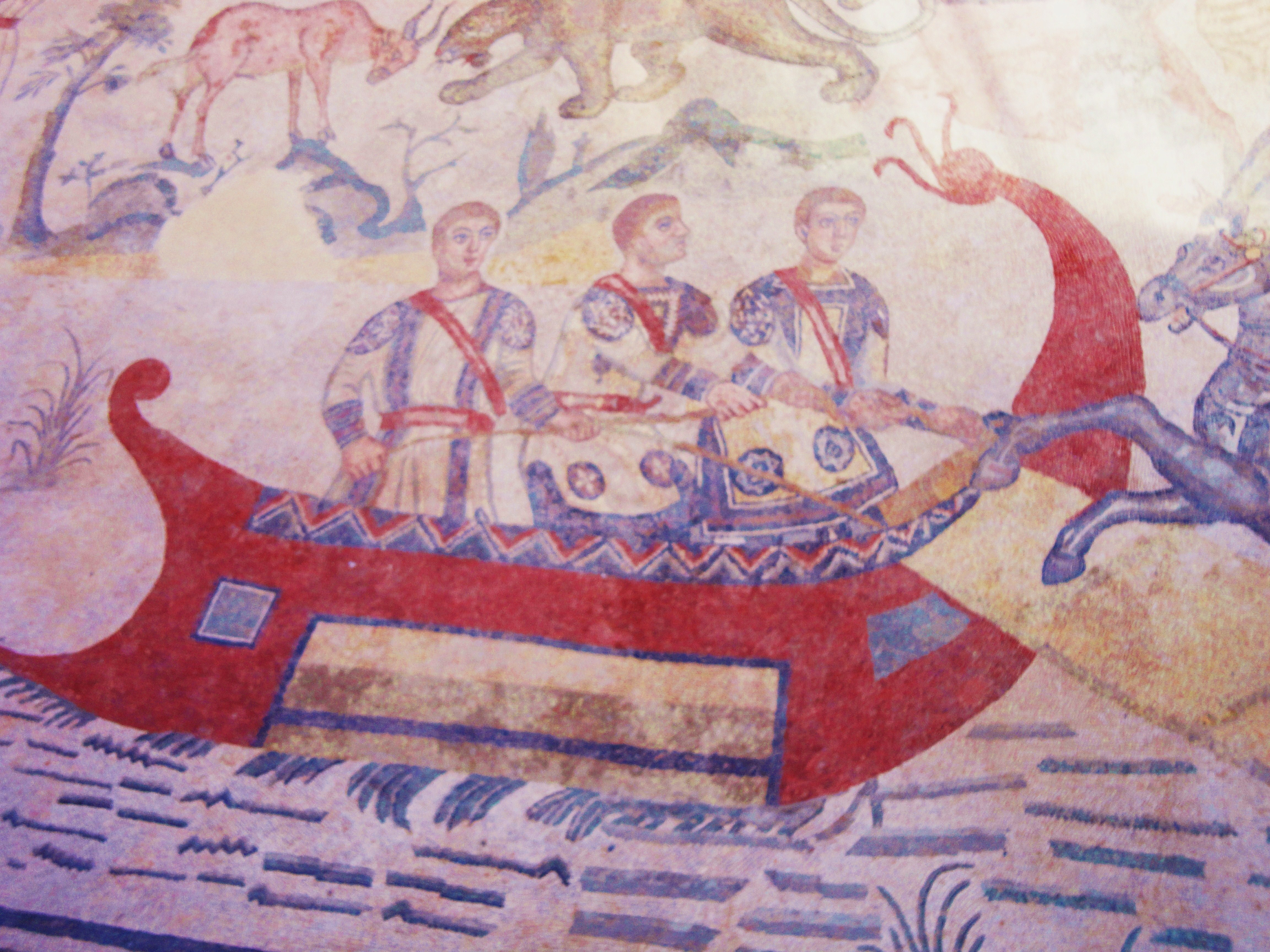
A ship in the Great Hunt mosaic

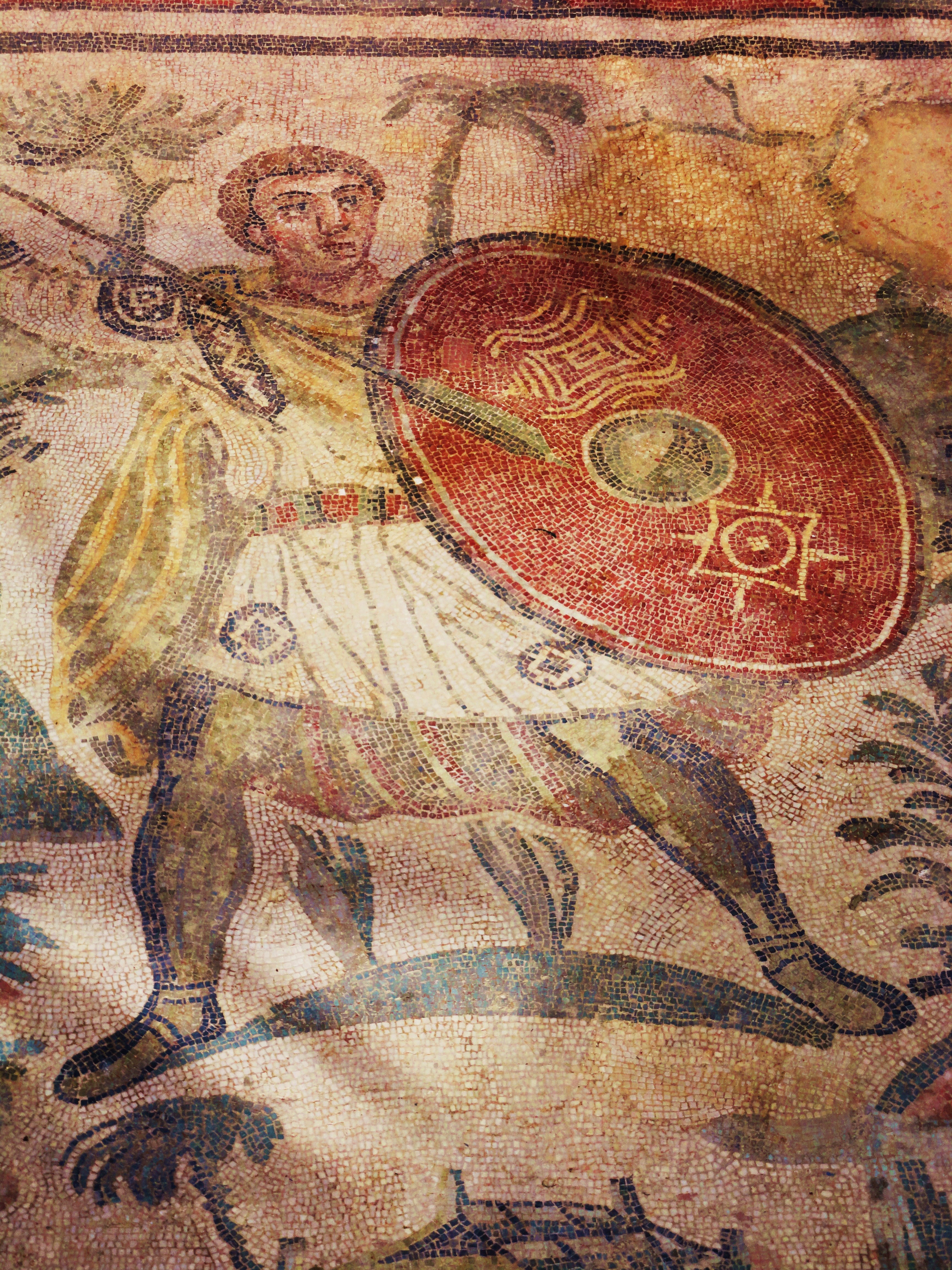
A hunter in the Great Hunt mosaic

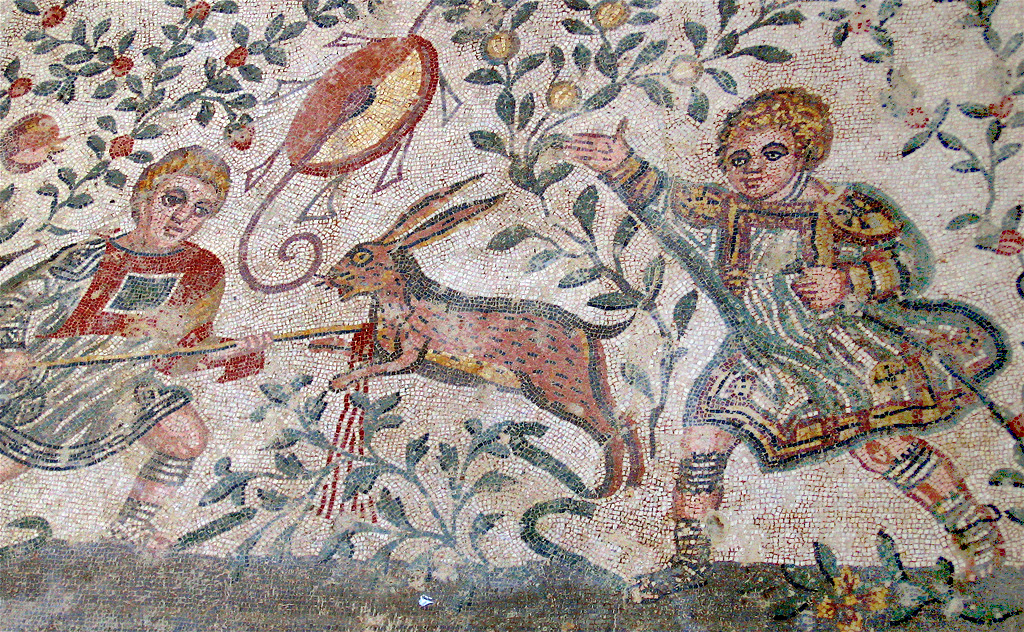
Young boys hunting a rabbit, Child Hunters Mosaic

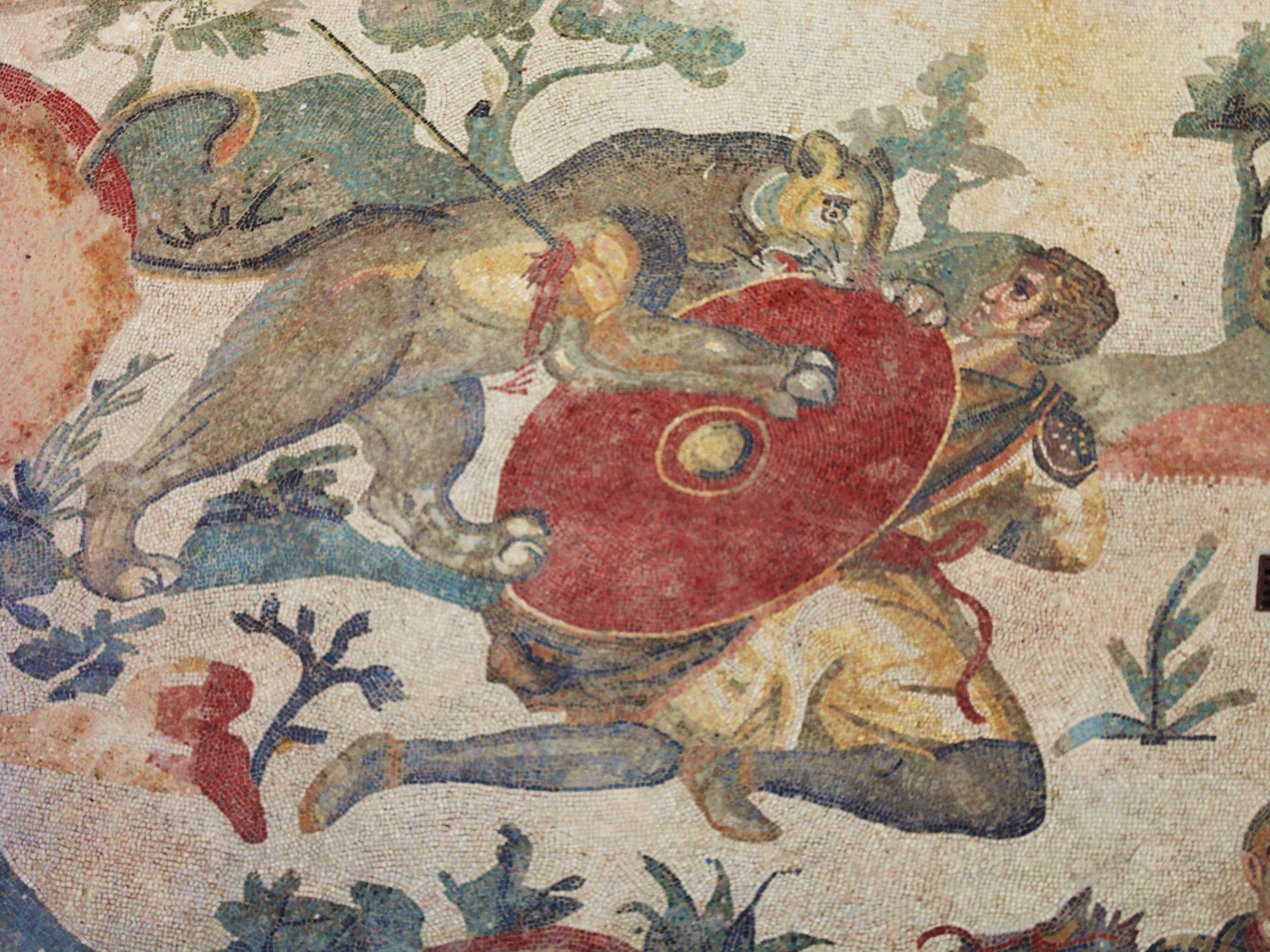
A wounded lioness attacks a hunter in the Great Hunt mosaic

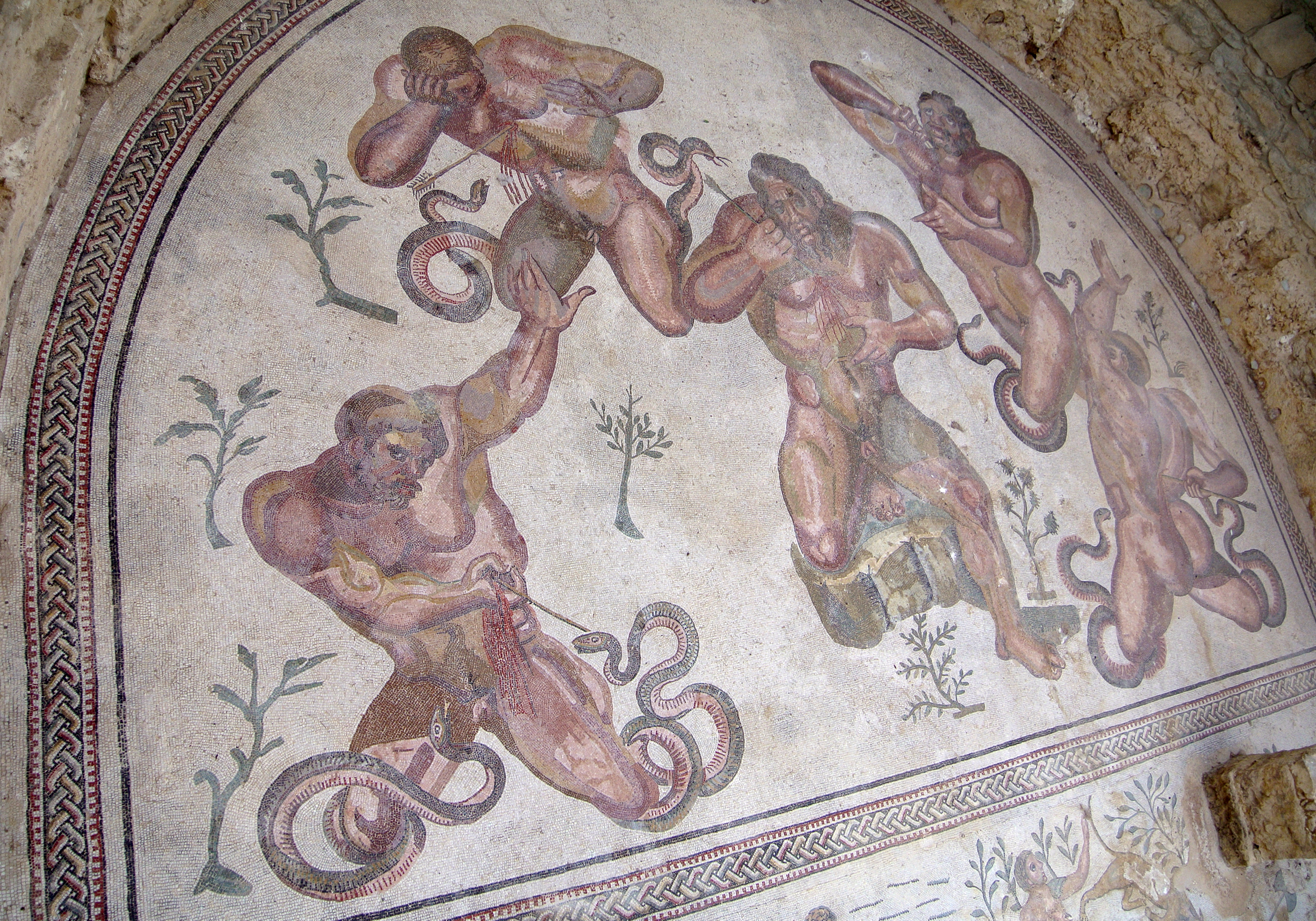
The Giants mosaic

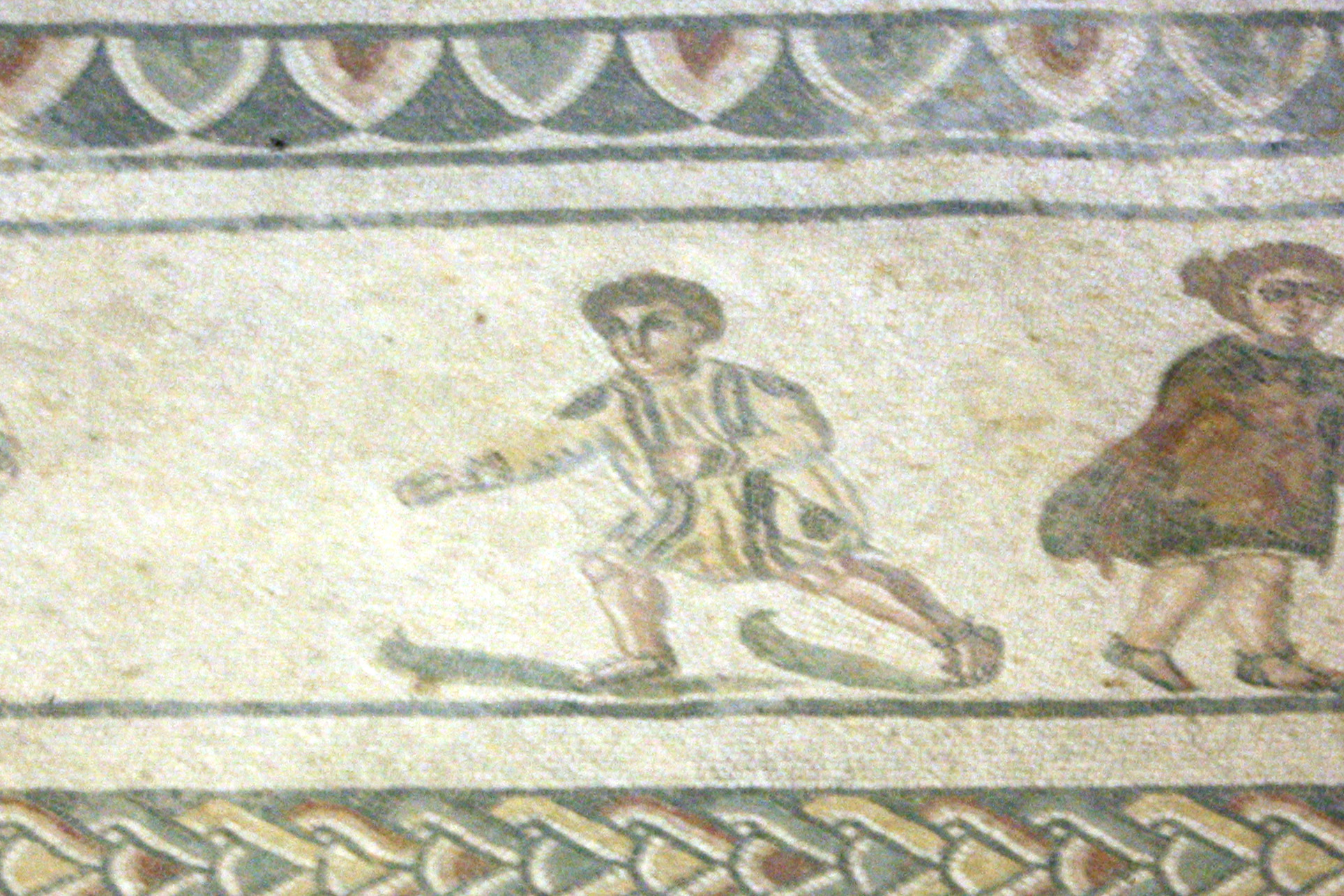
Two Roman women athletes in motion

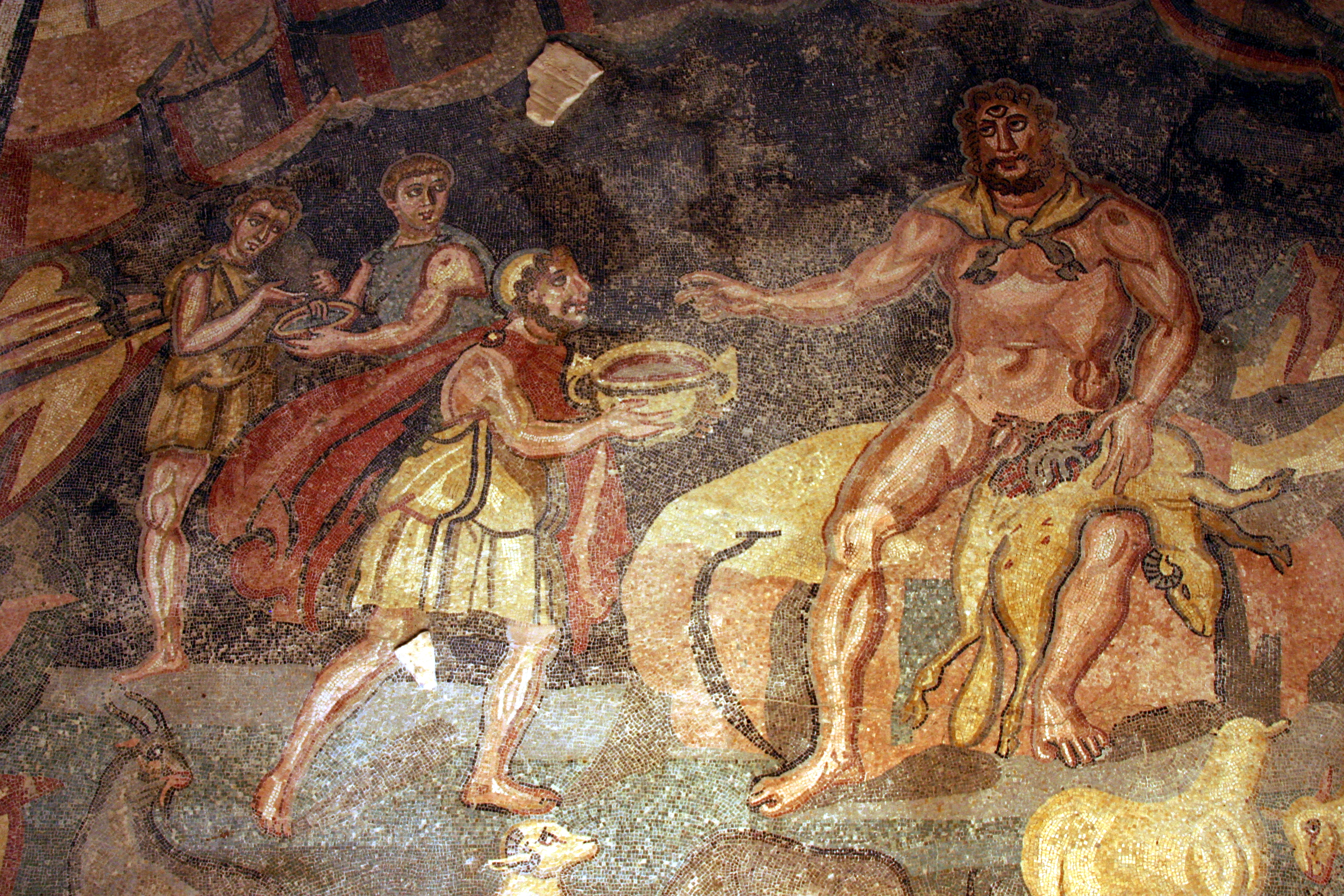
Polyphemus receiving a cup of wine from Ulysses. Anteroom (37) of the north apartment

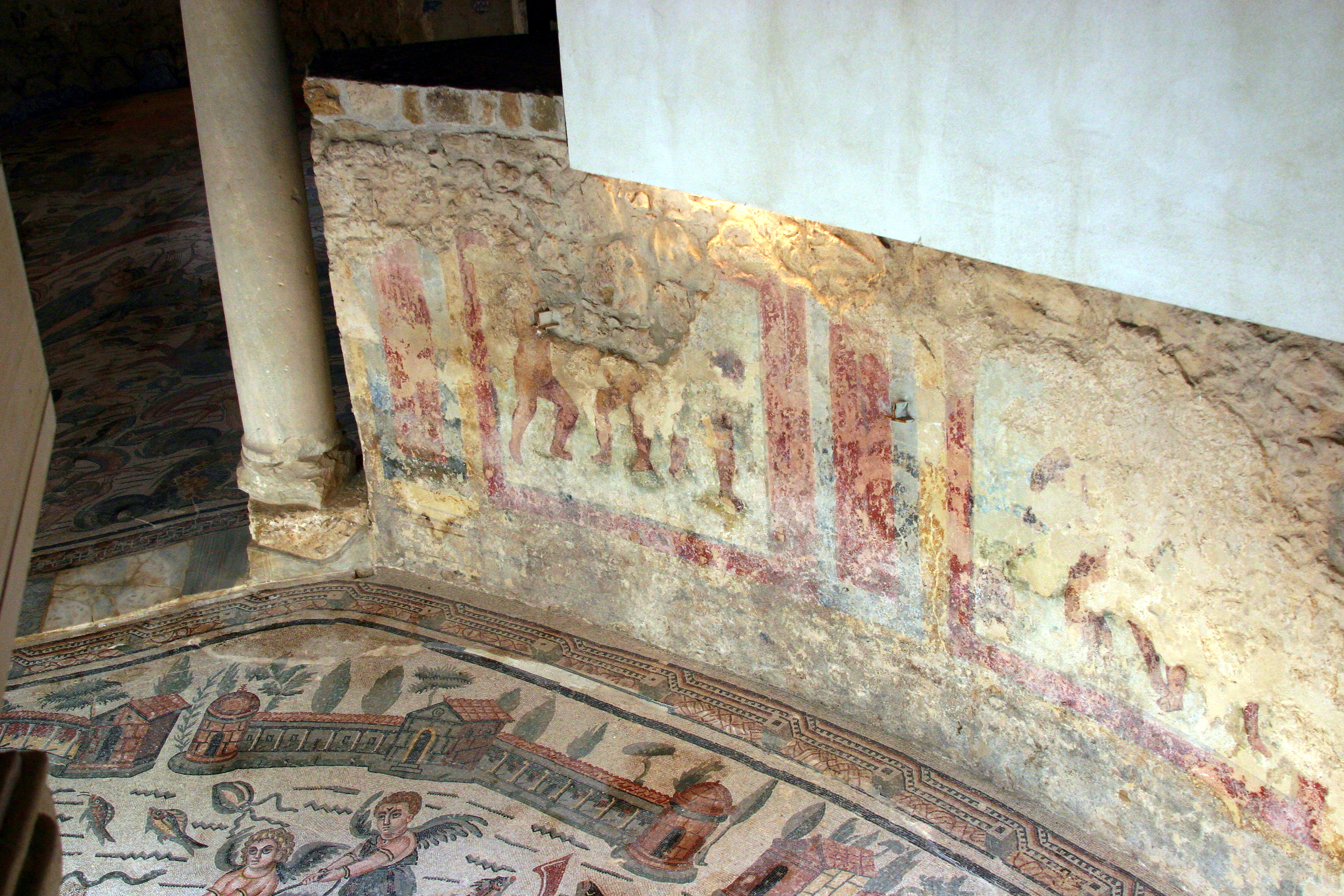
Fresco – Semicircular atrium

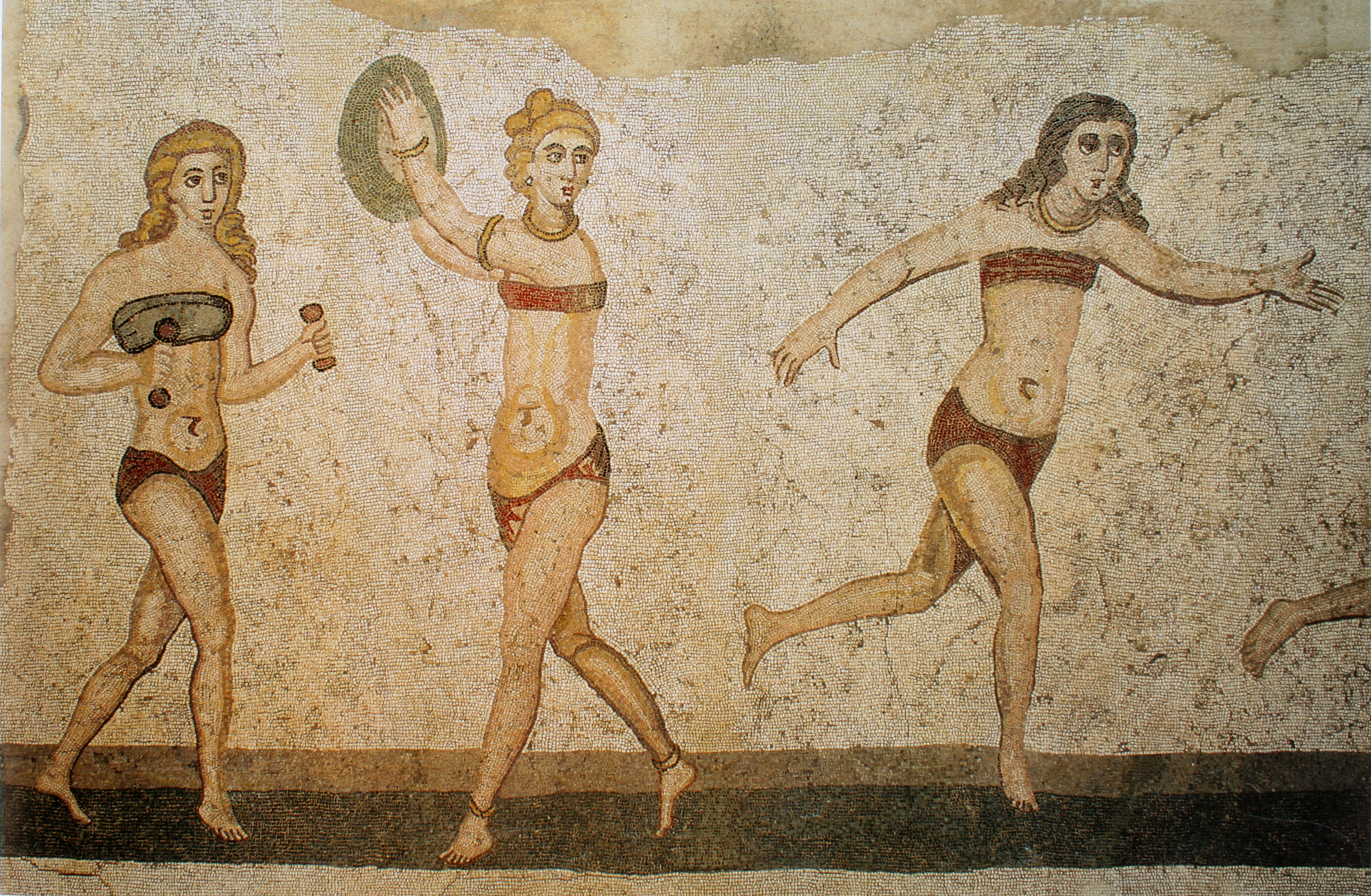
Women athletes competing in several sports

== Sources ==
- Petra C. Baum-vom Felde, Die geometrischen Mosaiken der Villa bei Piazza Armerina, Hamburg 2003, ISBN 3-8300-0940-2
- Brigit Carnabuci: Sizilien – Kunstreiseführer, DuMont Buchverlag, Köln 1998, ISBN 3-7701-4385-X
- Luciano Catullo and Gail Mitchell, 2000. The Ancient Roman Villa of Casale at Piazza Armerina: Past and Present
- R. J. A. Wilson: Piazza Armerina, Granada Verlag: London 1983, ISBN 0-246-11396-0.
- A. Carandini - A. Ricci - M. de Vos, Filosofiana, The villa of Piazza Armerina. The image of a Roman aristocrat at the time of Constantine, Palermo: 1982.
- S. Settis, "Per l'interpretazione di Piazza Armerina", in Mélanges de l'École française de Rome, Antiquité 87, 1975, 2, pp. 873–994.
