= Scilla (disambiguation) =

Scilla is a genus of perennial herbs. Scilla may also refer to

- Scilla (name)
- Scilla, Calabria, a town in Italy
- Scilla Lighthouse in Italy
- Dorsum Scilla, a wrinkle ridge on the Moon
- Scylla, a monster in Greek mythology
- A short form of Priscilla, a female given name
- Scilla, a smart contract programming language for Zilliqa

== See also ==
- Scylla (disambiguation)
- Silla (name)
- Sillah
- Sylla
