= Holy Week in Caltanissetta =

Christian observance in Caltanissetta, Italy

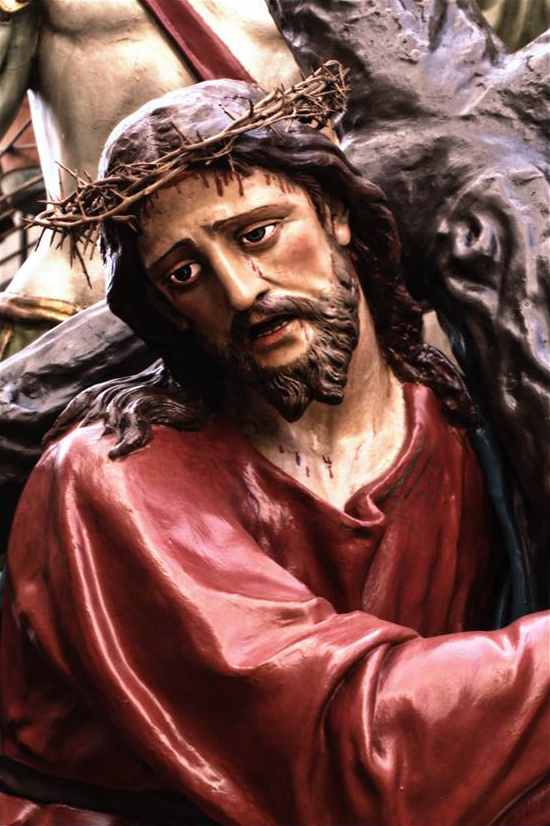
- Detail of one of the Vare of Holy Thursday.
- Official name: Settimana Santa di Caltanissetta
- Observed by: Caltanissetta, Italy
- Type: Religious
- Significance: Commemoration of the Passion of Jesus
- Observances: Processions
- Begins: Palm Sunday
- Ends: Easter
- Duration: From Palm Sunday to Easter Sunday
- First time: Mid-19th century: Jesus of Nazareth; 18th century: A Scinnenza; 16th century: the Maestranza (which became Royal in 1806); Early 20th century: the Varicedde; 17th century: the Vare; Around the 14th century: Black Christ; 1970s: Easter Sunday Procession

The Holy Week in Caltanissetta is a traditional event held in the comune of Caltanissetta in Sicily, Italy, during the week leading up to Easter. It comprises a series of interconnected religious manifestations that unfold from Palm Sunday to Easter Sunday. In 2006, it was inscribed in the Sicilian Intangible Heritage Register. The rituals of the Scinnenza and the Real Maestranza are part of the international Europassion circuit.

== Origins of Easter traditions ==
Around the 17th century, numerous congregations emerged within the Church of Sant'Agata al Collegio: Saint Ignatius, Purification of the Most Holy Mary, Saint Louis, and that of the Holy Virgin Child. These groups performed adoration of the Blessed Sacrament, which took place in the mother church from the evening of Holy Monday until noon on Holy Wednesday. At that point, they gave way to the Maestranza, which greeted the exposition of the Sacrament, followed by the pious visit to the Sepulchres, the adorned altars in the churches of the old city, between the afternoon of Holy Thursday and the morning of Good Friday. Throughout Lent and Holy Week, the various confraternities and congregations contemplated the Mysteries of the Passion of Jesus, giving rise to sacred reenactments and small processions, such as that of the Mysteries organized by the Congregation of Saint Philip Neri, held at vespers on Holy Thursday, which eventually evolved into the current Vare procession.

According to historian Michele Alesso, the procession routes were illuminated by pyramids of light supporting hundreds of candles.

Characteristic, above all, were the so-called “piramiti” (pyramids), small structures placed along Via del Collegio (now Corso Umberto I), around the square, and on the iron railing adorning the cornice of the façade of the Church of S. Agata. These devices had a rectangular base, tapering upward into a triangular shape. They were constructed from symmetrically arranged wooden strips, upon which numerous candles were placed to form various designs.

— Michele Alesso, Il Giovedì Santo in Caltanissetta, 1903

== Palm Sunday ==
=== Procession of Jesus the Nazarene ===
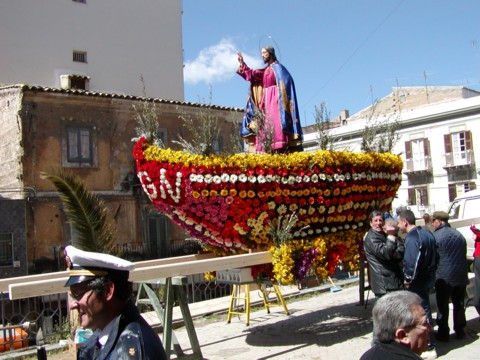
The flower-adorned boat and statue before being carried in procession

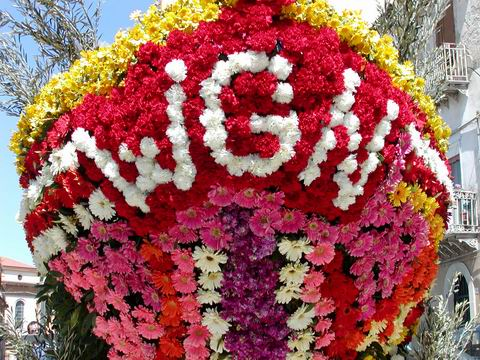
WGN: Viva Gesù Nazareno (Long Live Jesus the Nazarene)

Tradition holds that this procession was initiated by the peasants of Caltanissetta who, excluded from other Holy Week processions, sought to take a leading role at least on Palm Sunday. Before the end of the 19th century, the Congregation of the Holy Virgin Child carried in procession a flower-covered simulacrum of the lifeless body of Jesus, symbolizing peasant culture, from the Church of Sant'Agata al Collegio to the Cathedral, where adoration of Jesus Christ took place. In 1869, when Baron Vincenzo di Figlia di Granara pointed out the incongruity of this simulacrum with the festive atmosphere of Palm Sunday, a statue of the blessing Christ on a flower-decorated throne was introduced instead, gradually evolving into the celebration seen today.

The procession of Jesus the Nazarene allegorically reenacts the Entry of Jesus into Jerusalem. The statue of the blessing Christ is placed on a distinctive boat-shaped structure adorned with numerous wildflowers. Over the years, the shape of this structure has varied, having been cubic or "mountain-like" in the past. Several hypotheses explain why a boat shape was eventually chosen: it could symbolize the "fisher of souls," as Jesus is described in the Gospels, or it might stem from a linguistic corruption of abbarcu, one of the wildflowers used to decorate the structure. Even today, the structure is called abbarcu, though in Sicilian, "boat" is varca. Wildflowers, once gathered in the week before the procession, are now largely replaced by florists' flowers for aesthetic and time-saving reasons; however, to preserve tradition, devotees still adorn the upper edge and lower base with flowers they collect from the fields the day before, on Sunday morning.

Before departing from the courtyard of the former Jesuit College in the afternoon, the statue of the blessing Jesus the Nazarene, dressed in a fabric robe, is placed on the boat, surrounded by numerous ex voto. Passing through the library gate as if it were the gate of Jerusalem, the procession begins, winding through the main streets of the historic center.

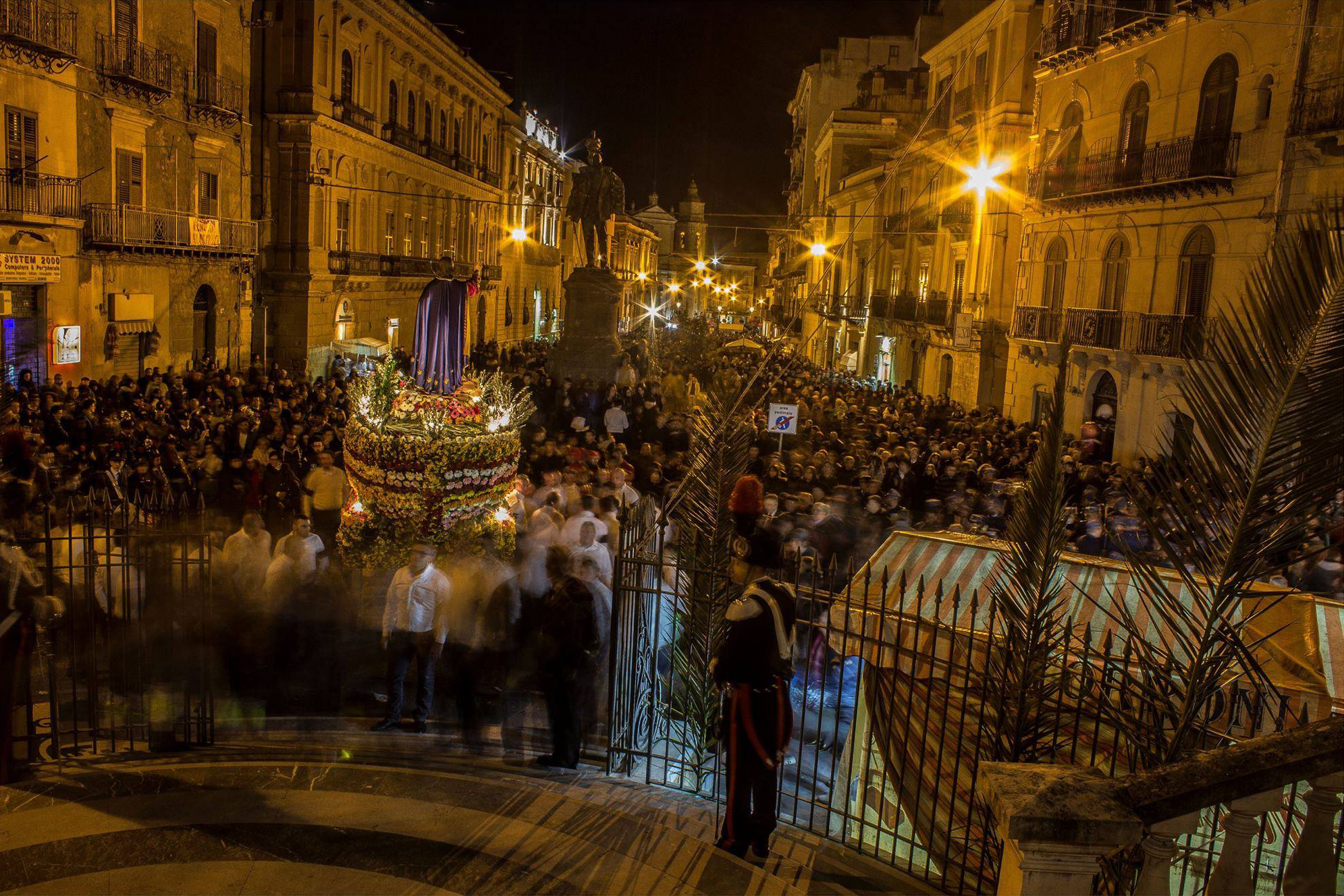
The flower-adorned boat at the end of the procession

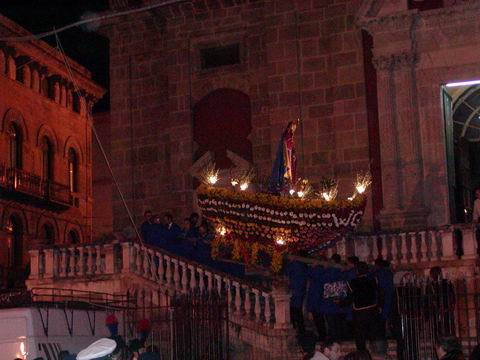
The flower-adorned boat during u Castiddu, the complex operation of returning the simulacrum to the Church of Sant'Agata al Collegio at the procession’s conclusion

Throughout the route, the procession is accompanied by numerous children carrying olive branches and woven palms, two musical bands, and members of the organizing confraternity, who proceed in two rows, dressed in distinctive attire and carrying bilannuna, large candles encased in cardboard holders bearing the simulacrum’s image.

In the evening, at the procession’s conclusion, the abbarcu is hoisted onto shoulders up the steps in front of the Church of Sant'Agata al Collegio and, before entering, is greeted with an impressive display of fireworks, known as u castiddu.

== Holy Monday and Tuesday ==
=== A Scinnenza ===
The term Scinnenza refers to a sacred representation of the Passion of Jesus, unfolding across three days: Holy Monday, Holy Tuesday, and Easter Sunday. In Sicilian, Scinnenza denotes the Deposition of Jesus from the cross (from the verb scìnniri, "to descend"), evoking the most dramatic moment of the entire reenactment.

The first act, performed on Holy Monday, opens the week with a depiction of the entry into Jerusalem, the Last Supper, including the washing of the feet and the institution of the Eucharist, and Jesus’ arrest.

The second act of the Scinnenza takes place on the evening of Holy Tuesday. A cortege of costumed participants, accompanied by a band playing the live soundtrack, moves through the historic center, staging the trial of Jesus in the praetorium by Pontius Pilate and the flagellation. This is followed by the Via Crucis, the stripping, the crucifixion and death of Christ, and the climactic moment of the entire sacred representation: the deposition of Jesus (scinnenza). The performance concludes with the repentance and suicide of Judas.

As early as 1780, representations were held in Caltanissetta on the four Fridays of March preceding Holy Week. The first true multi-actor performance occurred in 1840, but the following year, due to severe disturbances caused by the large crowd, it was discontinued. Successfully revived in 1957, it was staged again in 1961 by the Salesians and then consistently from 1972 to the present. Today, the Scinnenza is an established tradition recognized within the international Europassion circuit.

== Holy Wednesday ==
=== The Real Maestranza ===
The origins of the Real Maestranza date back to 1551, when it was formed as a citizen militia to defend Caltanissetta against potential invasions by the Turks. It consisted of artisans, known as mastri, organized into various categories based on their trades, and led by a captain of arms, typically a nobleman. The current historical procession originated from the practice on the morning of Holy Wednesday, when, after the forty hours of exposition of the Blessed Sacrament in the mother church for the faithful’s adoration, the Maestranza saluted the display of the Venerable, shown by the priest in an ostensory from the church’s forecourt. At that moment, the Maestranza fired blank shots with arquebuses to honor the Blessed Sacrament.

The title "Royal" was bestowed in 1806 by Ferdinand IV of Bourbon, who, during a visit to Caltanissetta, was impressed by the grand parade of the Maestranza. In 1848, the militia lost its military character due to fears it might support anti-Bourbon uprisings. The weapons were replaced with candles, which are still carried in the procession today, though the group continues to participate in the city’s major religious events, such as the procession of the "Black Christ" on Good Friday and the procession of Saint Michael on May 8.

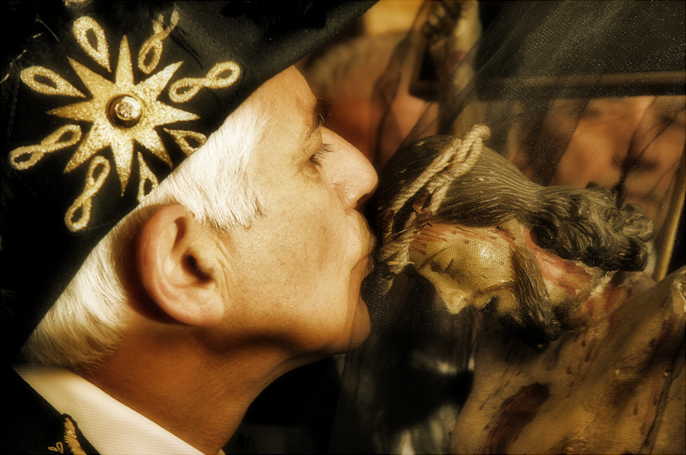
The Captain receives the black-veiled Crucifix

The focal point of the procession, and indeed all Holy Week events, is the Captain, an artisan chosen annually from a different category, who enjoys certain privileges throughout the week: he holds the keys to the city, carries a sword as a symbol of command, wears the tricolor sash as a sign of loyalty to state authority, and is appointed a Knight of the Republic. From the same category as the Captain, the captaincy roles are selected: the Squire, who carries the shield and lance; the Historical Standard-Bearer, who bears the ancient multicolored banner of the Real Maestranza; and the Chief Ensign.

During the historical procession, the Captain is preceded by the Squire. Ahead of the Squire is the Historical Standard-Bearer, who is in turn preceded by the Chief Ensign, opening the procession with the standard depicting all the patron saints of the categories. For each category, a Standard-Bearer is appointed to carry the banner with the effigy of the category’s patron saint, along with an Halberdier.

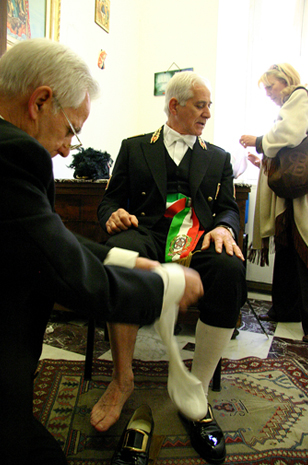
The dressing ritual of the Captain

In addition to these roles, primarily tied to the procession and renewed annually, there are others with longer terms: the Grand Ceremonial Master, typically the oldest artisan, the Master of Ceremonies, the Ecclesiastical Ceremonial Master, the Procession Coordinator, the General Consul, the Board Members, and the Category Consuls. Finally, all other artisans are the Milizioti, a term recalling the ancient militia origins of the Real Maestranza.

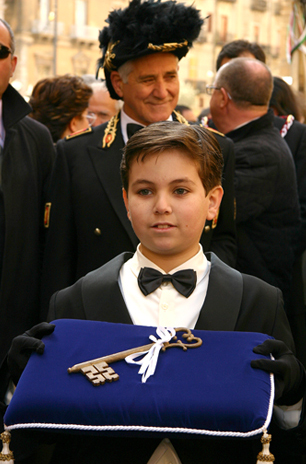
The Captain and the Page, with the city keys

Preparations for the ceremony begin early on Holy Wednesday morning, adhering to strict tradition. The Master of Ceremonies visits the Captain’s home to commence the dressing ritual, donning a typical 18th-century outfit, under the watchful eyes of previous Captains, the General Consul, and the Ceremonial Masters. During this phase, the Captain wears black stockings, like the other milizioti, along with black gloves and a bow tie. Meanwhile, artisans from the various categories pick up their respective halberdiers and standard-bearers from their homes. The category chosen by the Captain will form a procession to collect the Standard Bearer, the Historical Flag Bearer, and the Squire from their respective houses. Subsequently, all categories gather in Piazza Garibaldi and proceed together with the band to pay homage to the Captain at his home. After a brief greeting from the balcony, the Captain descends to the street, announced by three trumpet blasts and welcomed with enthusiastic applause.

There, he is greeted by the President of the Real Maestranza Association, who invites him to review the assembled militia with the words: “Captain, the militia is ready. Honor them by reviewing them.” During this phase, the Captain uses a military salute, a vestige of the Maestranza’s militia origins.

After the review, the cortege, typically comprising about four hundred artisans, proceeds to the Town Hall with banners unfurled, bearing both white and black ribbons, where the Mayor hands the Captain the keys to the city, symbolically entrusting him with the city’s responsibility until Easter Sunday.

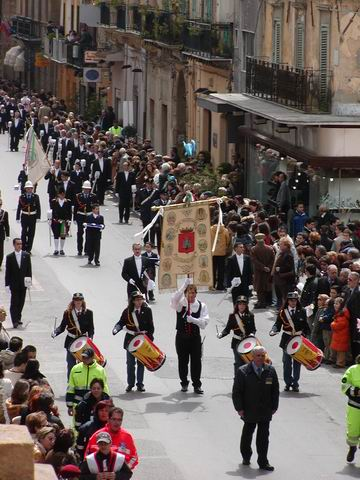
The Real Maestranza cortege parading along Corso Umberto I on the morning of Holy Wednesday

From there, the entire cortege moves to the courtyard of the former Jesuit College, home to the Scarabelli Library, where candles are lit, banners are lowered, halberds are draped in mourning, the gonfalon is raised, and once the Captain receives the black-veiled Crucifix, the penitential procession begins toward the Cathedral. Accompanied by the imperial drums of the band playing funeral marches, the entire Maestranza wears black gloves and bow ties as a sign of mourning. Inside the Cathedral, the Captain receives forgiveness for taking on the sins of all, and together with the Maestranza, replaces the black stockings, tie, and gloves with white ones, symbolizing joy. At noon, the Real Maestranza exits the Cathedral, escorting the Venerable carried by the Bishop in a golden ostensory, while the band plays festive tunes, and the Captain carries a candle instead of the black-veiled Crucifix.

After the intense morning, the Captain returns home, where he receives the artisan categories, civil and ecclesiastical authorities, and finally friends and relatives throughout the afternoon and much of the evening.

The current ten categories participating in the Real Maestranza are: Bakers, Plumbers and Tinsmiths, Barbers, Decorative Painters, Masons, Marble Workers, Carpenters and Cabinetmakers, Iron Workers, Shoemakers, Leatherworkers and Upholsterers, and Blacksmiths.

=== Procession of the Varicedde ===
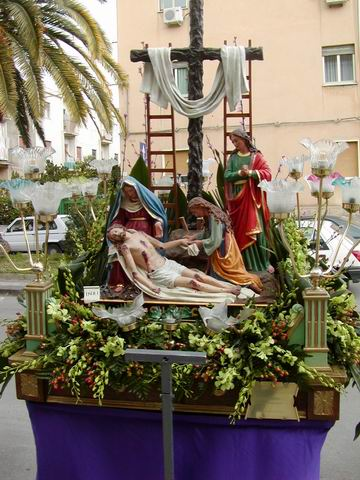
The Varicedda of La Pietà

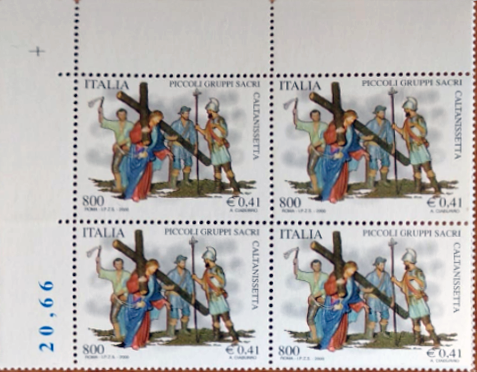
Small sacred groups CL - 4 stamps depicting the Varicedda of Il Cireneo.

The Varicedde (from the Sicilian term Variceddi, meaning "little Vare"), are nineteen statuary groups carried in procession on the evening of Holy Wednesday. Sixteen of these are smaller replicas of the sixteen Vare that parade on Holy Thursday, with three additional groups depicting scenes from the Passion of Christ.

The procession of the Varicedde emerged in the early 1900s when young shop apprentices, excluded from the Holy Thursday Vare procession, decided to organize a cortege with small terracotta imitations of the large Vare, starting from the San Domenico district at sunset on Holy Wednesday. The Varicedde were carried in procession on trays in the palm of the hand, accompanied by Sicilian chants of sorrow: the Lamentanze or Ladate, similar to those still performed on the evening of Good Friday, sung by the young organizers.

Within a few years, however, the procession faded away entirely, only to be revived in the 1920s when sculptor and restorer Giuseppe Emma from San Cataldo was commissioned by private individuals to create small replicas of the Vare to restore the procession. It began in front of the Church of San Giuseppe, near Piazza Garibaldi and the Provvidenza district, following the route of the large groups on Holy Thursday. Salvatore Capizzi, an artist from Caltanissetta, was also tasked with crafting additional small groups for the procession, which was interrupted between 1941 and 1945 due to World War II. In the 1950s, the event was resumed with greater organization, taking on its current form, and new groups were commissioned from Salvatore Capizzi and Giuseppe Emma. The materials used were generally consistent across all sacred groups: terracotta for faces, hands, and feet; wood for frameworks; and papier-mâché for drapery. In 1994, the owners of the Varicedde established the "Piccoli Gruppi Sacri - Le Varicedde" association to better organize the procession. Typically, the Varicedde are kept in the homes of their owners. During the early afternoon of Holy Wednesday, they are placed at various points around the city and prepared for the procession with floral decorations and lights. As vespers approach, accompanied by musical bands, all the Varicedde converge in Piazza Garibaldi, where the procession begins. Since 2016, the route has returned to its historical path (Piazza Garibaldi, Corso Umberto, Via Re d'Italia, Corso Vittorio Emanuele, Piazza Garibaldi, Corso Umberto, Piazza Calatafimi, Via Berengario Gaetani, Via Consultore Benintendi, Piazza Mercato Grazia, Viale Conte Testasecca, Via XX Settembre, Corso Umberto, Piazza Garibaldi). Along the entire route, numerous devotees, mostly youths and children, accompany the procession with candles, tapers, and especially the traditional bilannuna, large candles.

The procession concludes several hours later in Piazza Garibaldi, where it began. Afterwards, the Varicedde are displayed until Easter Sunday in the atrium of the Palazzo del Carmine, the Town Hall.

==== List of Varicedde ====
Name	Year of creation	Author	Current owners
The Supper	1958	Salvatore Capizzi	Bella and Bruno families
The Prayer in the Garden	1952	Salvatore Capizzi	Riggi Leonardo family
The Arrest	1939	Giuseppe Emma	Archetti and Miraglia families
The Sanhedrin	1947	Salvatore Capizzi	Riggio Francesco family
The Flagellation	1947	Giuseppe Emma	Alfonso Farruggio family
Ecce Homo	1933	Salvatore Capizzi	Riggi Vincenzo family
The Condemnation	1950	Giuseppe Emma	Russo Michele family
The First Fall	1924	Giuseppe Emma	Corvo Giovanni family
Jesus Meets His Most Holy Mother	1987	Giuseppe Emma	Iacono Marco and Salvatore families
The Cyrenean	1924	Giuseppe Emma	Di Giovanni Lucio family
Veronica	1949	Salvatore Capizzi	Paolillo Francesco Salvatore and Stella Antonio Alberto families
The Stripping	1955	Salvatore Capizzi	Arcangelo Manlio Giammusso family
Jesus Nailed to the Cross	1995	Emma brothers, sons of Giuseppe	Cimino Calogero family
The Calvary	1924	Giuseppe Emma	Gervasi family
The Deposition	1965	Salvatore Capizzi	Spena Nicola and Michele family
The Pietà	1924	Giuseppe Emma	Lo Dico family
The Translation	1924	Salvatore Capizzi	Fonti and Venniro families
The Urn	1956	Salvatore Capizzi	Fiocco Salvatore family
The Desolate	1934	Salvatore Capizzi	Cimino Lorenzo family

== Holy Thursday ==
=== Procession of the Vare ===
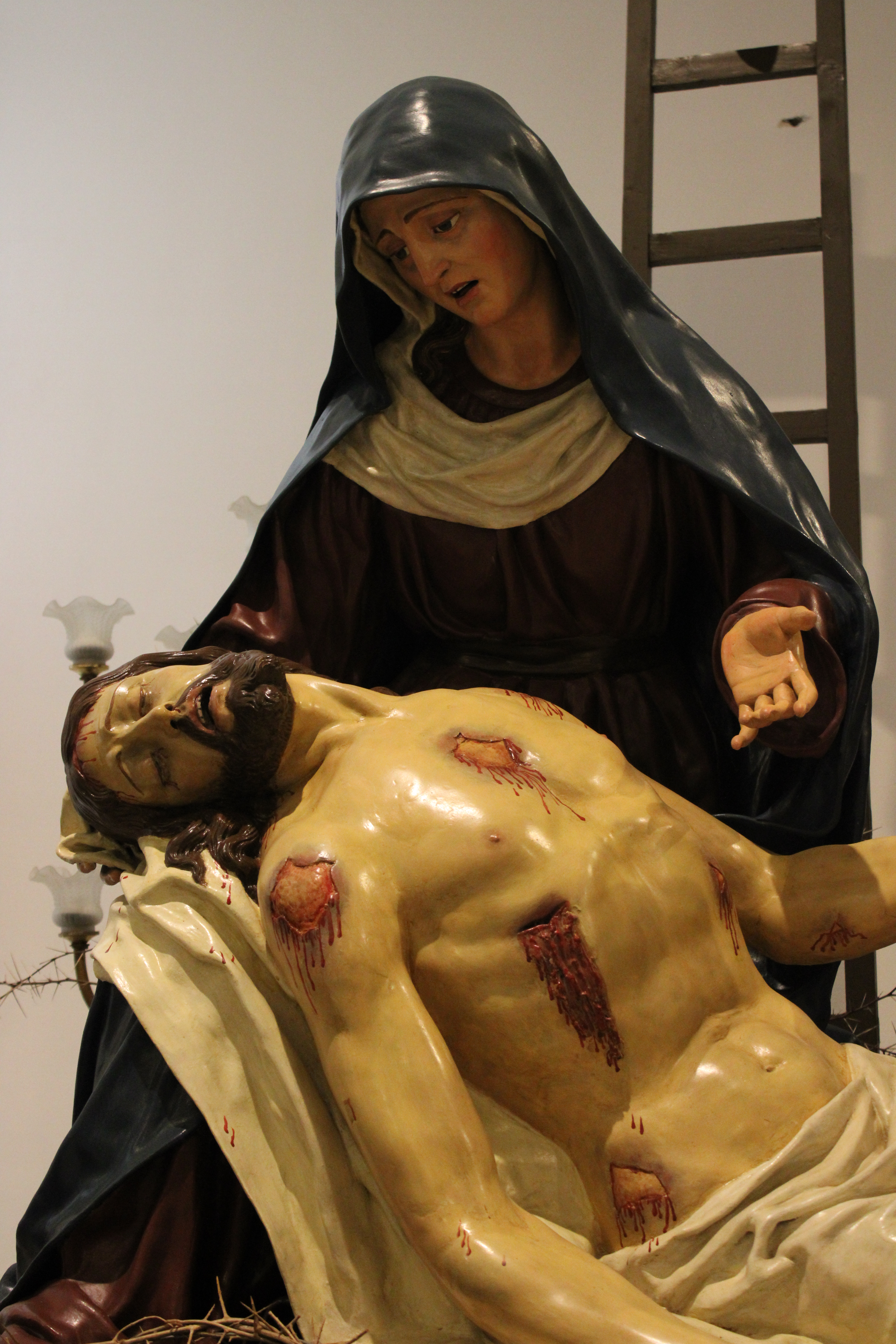
Detail of the Pietà, one of the Vare parading on Holy Thursday in Caltanissetta. Work of Francesco and Vincenzo Biangardi.

The Vare are sixteen statuary groups representing scenes from the Passion of Jesus and stations of the Via Crucis, carried in procession on the evening of Holy Thursday. This is by far the most significant moment of the Caltanissetta Holy Week, earning it worldwide fame.

The Vare of Caltanissetta currently paraded on the evening of Holy Thursday through the historic center streets were crafted between 1883 and 1902 by Neapolitan artist Francesco Biangardi and partly by his son Vincenzo (who died prematurely in 1890) using a mixed technique of wood, papier-mâché, and oilcloth lined with stucco. The only Vare still in procession not created by the Biangardis are The Translation, commissioned in 1853 in Naples to an unknown sculptor, and The Flagellation, begun by Francesco Biangardi and completed by his pupils due to the master’s death.

Initially, the Vare were carried on the shoulders of devotees and individuals hired by the owners, despite their weight and size. Over the years, various alternative transport methods were attempted: for instance, they were towed by tractors or mounted on vans. This continued until the late 1960s, when all Vare were permanently fitted with wheeled carts, requiring fewer bearers than traditional shoulder carrying.

=== Origins ===
In 1780, the Congregation of Saint Philip Neri, established in 1690 in the city’s mother church, first carried five tiny papier-mâché statuary reproductions of the five sorrowful mysteries of the Rosary in procession at vespers on Holy Thursday: Jesus in the Garden, The Flagellation, The Crowning with Thorns, The Ascent to Calvary, and The Crucifixion. These were brought in adoration to five churches in the old city (namely the Mother Church, San Sebastiano, Sant'Agata al Collegio, Santa Croce, and the Collegio di Maria), where, per tradition (common in other parts of Sicily and Southern Italy generally), the so-called "Sepulchres" were set up—altars solemnly decorated as if they were the Tomb of Jesus Christ, with draperies, floral arrangements, or other symbols.

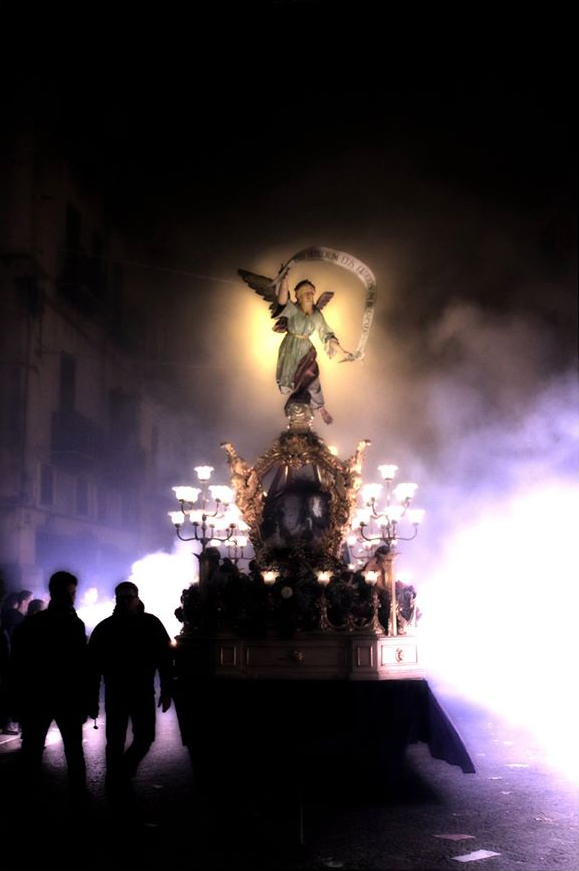
The Holy Urn, the penultimate Vara of Holy Thursday in Caltanissetta.

The procession was discontinued in 1801 for unknown reasons, only to be revived in 1841 at the behest of some notables of the time, including the prominent pharmacist Giuseppe Alesso, a member of the Congregation of Saint Philip Neri. He had seven new "Vare" constructed using statues from the Church of San Sebastiano and other city churches. These groups were not very large and depicted key moments of the Passion of Jesus: The Prayer in the Garden, The Kiss of Judas, The Lord at the Column, Ecce Homo, The Crucifixion, The Body of Jesus, and The Sorrowful Mother:

The procession departed from the Church of San Sebastiano, announced by a hearty salvo of rockets and firecrackers. The Vare were solemnly adorned with candles and precious flowers and were preceded by about a hundred nimble boys shouting at the top of their lungs, holding "fanara" (rushes tied with wicker, creating the effect of a torchlight procession). Each Vara was followed by a number of devotees singing the "Ladata." After visiting the five sepulchres of the city—Cattedrale, Sant'Agata, San Francesco, Santa Croce, and Collegio di Maria—the procession reached Piazza Ferdinandea (now Piazza Garibaldi) after two hours. The groups, arranged in a semicircle, were commented on by Father Serafino. Following the sermon, the procession disbanded, and the Vare returned to the church

— Michele Alesso, Il Giovedì Santo in Caltanissetta, pp. 37-38, 1903

The procession continued in subsequent years, with various city guilds and confraternities commissioning increasingly larger but artistically modest new groups from amateur artists, bringing the number of Vare to 14 by 1850. In 1853, the Congregation of the Candelora, largely composed of masons and blacksmiths, commissioned a life-sized group, "The Translation", from Naples. Once completed, it arrived in Palermo by steamboat and was transported to Caltanissetta on an ox-drawn cart to join the other Vare in procession. From 1866, however, the procession faced a crisis due to the suppression of religious orders and confraternities, nearly disappearing.

On November 12, 1881, a firedamp explosion in the Gessolungo sulphur mine killed 66 miners; in gratitude for surviving the tragedy, the survivors commissioned Neapolitan sculptor Francesco Biangardi and his son Vincenzo, then working in Mussomeli, to create the group Veronica. Following the success of this work, other guilds commissioned additional life-sized groups from the Biangardis, replacing the old Vare in the Holy Thursday procession.

=== The procession ===
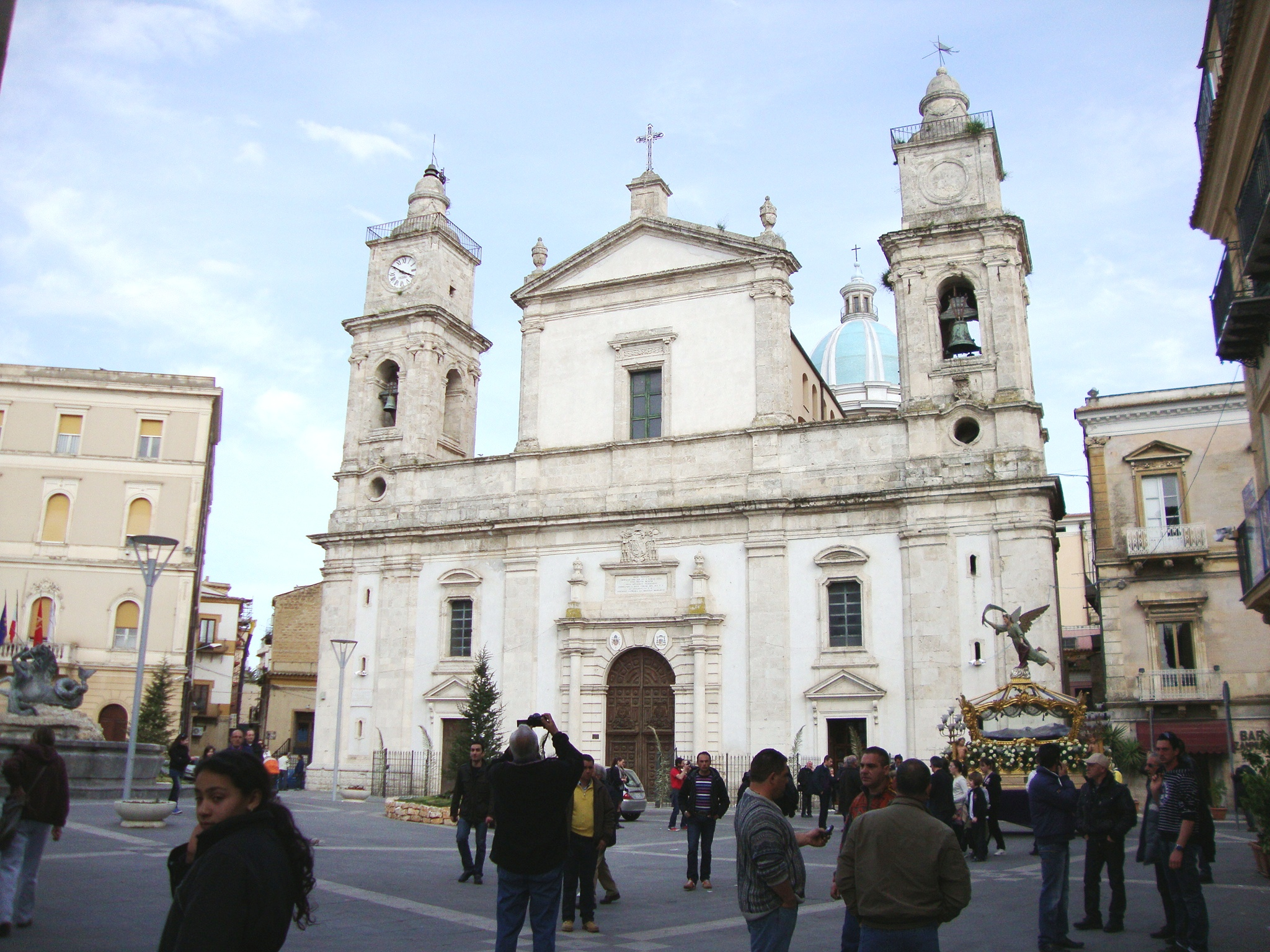
Piazza Garibaldi in the early afternoon of Holy Thursday. On the right, the arrival of the Vara of The Holy Urn is visible.

From the early morning of Holy Thursday, the Vare are positioned in various city streets, typically in front of their owners’ homes, and decorated with flowers and lights, while musical bands create a cheerful preparatory atmosphere. As dusk falls, however, the music shifts abruptly to funeral marches and chants of the Passion of Jesus (the so-called "Lamentanze" or "Ladate"). The Vare are then escorted by the bands to Piazza Garibaldi, where they are surrounded by a crowd. Around 9:00 PM, once all the groups have taken their positions, forming a circle around the Fountain of the Triton, the procession begins with the first group, The Supper, setting off, followed by the others in sequence.

Throughout the route, each Vara is almost escorted by numerous participants: the band, the congregations, the Vara’s owners, and some youths dressed in white robes carrying candles. At various points, the Vare pause and are greeted by impressive fireworks.

Thus begins the first circuit of the procession, starting from Piazza Garibaldi, proceeding along the first half of Corso Umberto I to the front of the Church of Sant'Agata al Collegio, then entering Via Re d'Italia, known as Strata 'i Santi. It passes the Church of Santa Croce, called Badìa by locals, and upon reaching the end of Corso Vittorio Emanuele, where another fireworks display is usually held, returns to Corso Umberto I to begin the second circuit. After traversing the entire avenue, the Vare proceed along Via Redentore, then turn into Via Maddalena Calafato, finding themselves at the opposite end of Corso Vittorio Emanuele. There, at Via XX Settembre, the procession halts to allow the participants and musicians to eat and drink offerings provided by the Vare owners. After about an hour’s pause, during which the vast crowd can admire the stationary Vare along the avenue, the procession resumes with the striking passage through the narrow, steep incline of Via XX Settembre, known as Strata 'i Spini. The Vare navigate with difficulty there, with bearers exerting considerable effort due to the steep gradient. From there, the procession moves through the Provvidenza district and descends slowly along Corso Umberto I back to Piazza Garibaldi.

By around 5:00 AM, the Vare reassemble in a circle in Piazza Garibaldi after circling the Fountain of the Triton, still accompanied by the bands. They then return to the places where they are kept, giving way to the Spartenza (from the Sicilian spartiri, meaning "to separate"), marking the end of the procession.

Originally, the Vare were stored in various locations: The Supper, The Flagellation, Ecce Homo, The Condemnation, and The Deposition were kept in a depot on Via Xiboli belonging to the Chiesa della Stella (now converted into commercial premises), The Pietà and The Translation at Gessolungo, The Prayer in the Garden at San Giuseppe, The Arrest at Sant'Agata, The Sanhedrin at the Church of San Antonino (later demolished to build the Post Office Building), The First Fall and The Sorrowful Mother at Santa Lucia, The Cyrenean at San Domenico, Veronica at the Church of Santa Croce, The Crucifixion at San Sebastiano, and The Holy Urn in the Cathedral. Thus, at the procession’s end, the Vare could be seen dispersing chaotically in all directions. In recent years, however, the Spartenza has lost some of its original charm, as today all Vare, except The Holy Urn, are stored at the sacred groups’ exhibition hall beneath the San Pio X Church.

==== List of Vare in processional order ====
Name	Popular Name	Year of creation	Artists	Commissioners	Current owners
The Supper		1885	Francesco and Vincenzo Biangardi	Pasta Makers and Bakers	Bakers
The Prayer in the Garden	U Signuri all'ortu	1884	Francesco and Vincenzo Biangardi	Pasta Makers and Millers	Millers
The Arrest	A vasata di Giuda	1884	Francesco and Vincenzo Biangardi	Gardeners	Heirs of Biagio and Calogero Giunta
The Sanhedrin	Caifàs	1886	Francesco and Vincenzo Biangardi	Miners of Iungio Testasecca	Caltanissetta Municipality
The Flagellation	U Signuri alla culonna	1909	Francesco Biangardi and disciples	Miners of Gessolungo	Cervellione family
Ecce Homo	U Signuri a u barcuni	1892	Francesco Biangardi	Fruit and Vegetable Sellers and Grocers	Fruit and Vegetable Sellers
The Condemnation	A vara di Pilatu	1902	Francesco Biangardi	Miners of Trabonella	Printers
The Fall		1886	Francesco and Vincenzo Biangardi	Congregation of Santa Lucia	Marble Workers
The Cyrenean		1886	Francesco and Vincenzo Biangardi	Plasterers	Cannarozzo family
Veronica		1883	Francesco and Vincenzo Biangardi	Miners of Gessolungo	Sacred League of San Michele
The Crucifixion (Calvary)	A Cruci	1891	Francesco Biangardi	Butchers	Butchers
The Deposition	A Scinnenza	1885	Francesco and Vincenzo Biangardi	Miners of Iungio Tumminelli	D’Oro family
The Pietà		1888	Francesco and Vincenzo Biangardi	Borgesi (small to medium agricultural entrepreneurs)	Banca di Credito Cooperativo del Nisseno "San Michele"
The Translation		1853	Anonymous Neapolitan of the Fittipaldi school	Congregation of the Candelora	Masons’ Union
The Holy Urn		1892	Francesco Biangardi	Priests	Clergy and Congregation of San Filippo Neri
The Sorrowful Mother (Desolate)		1896	Francesco Biangardi	Vintners, Carters, Brokers, and Tavern Keepers	Hauliers

== Good Friday ==
=== Procession of the Lord of the City ===
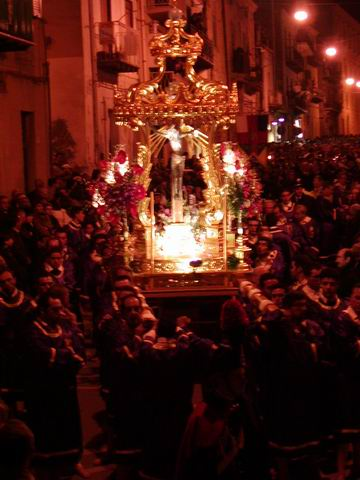
A moment from the Black Christ procession

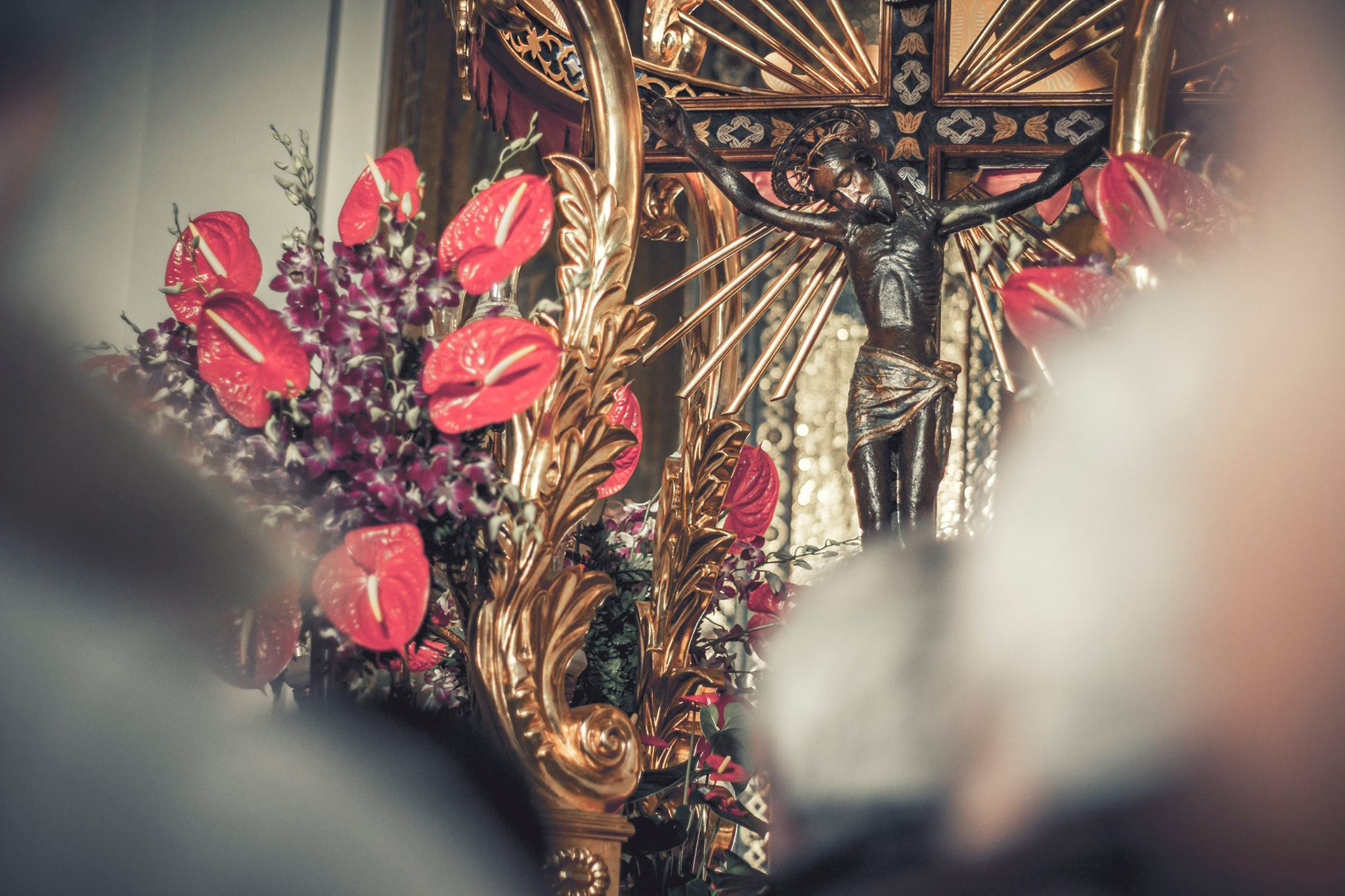
Simulacrum of the Black Christ or Lord of the City

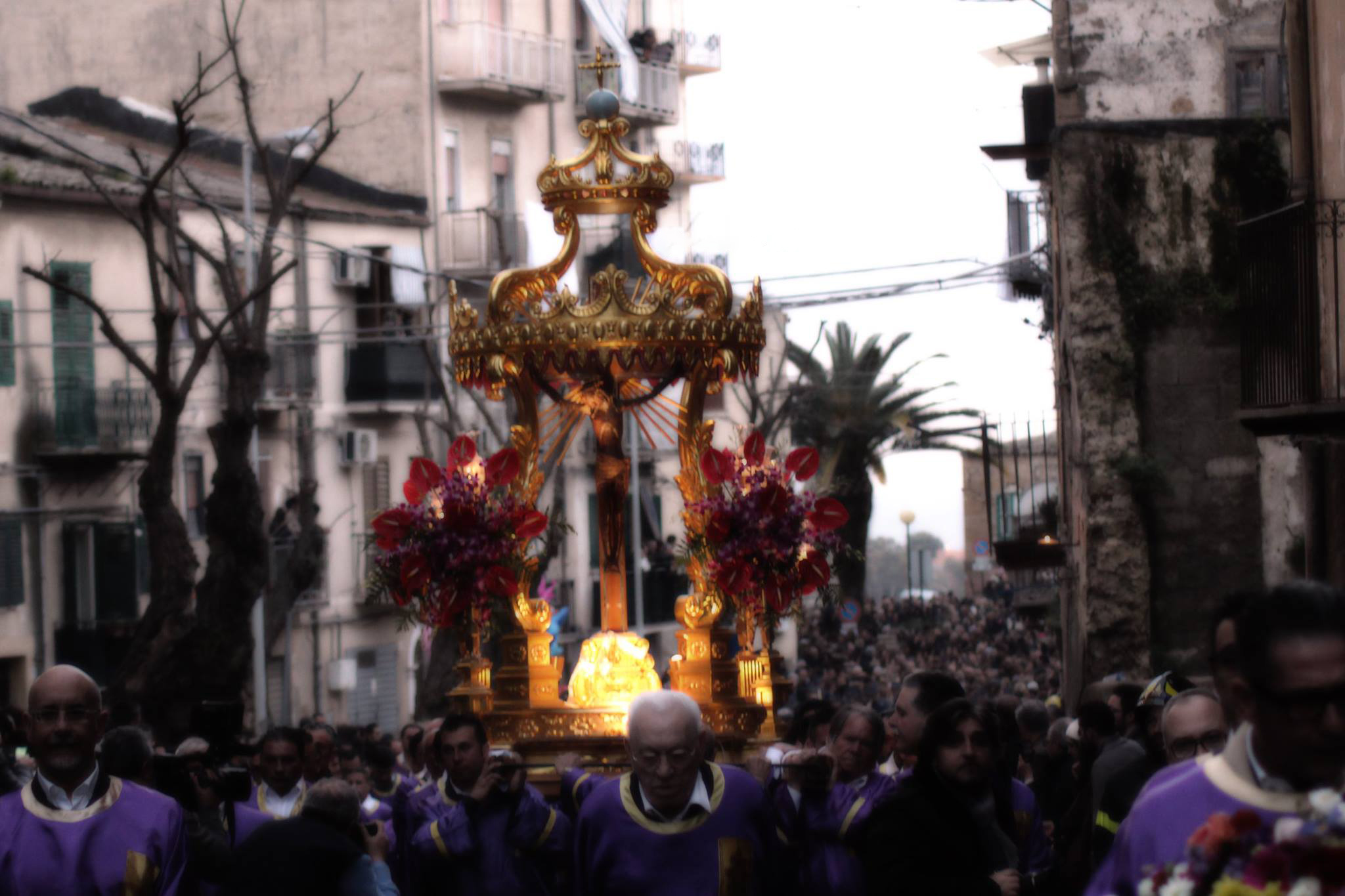
Moments of Passion

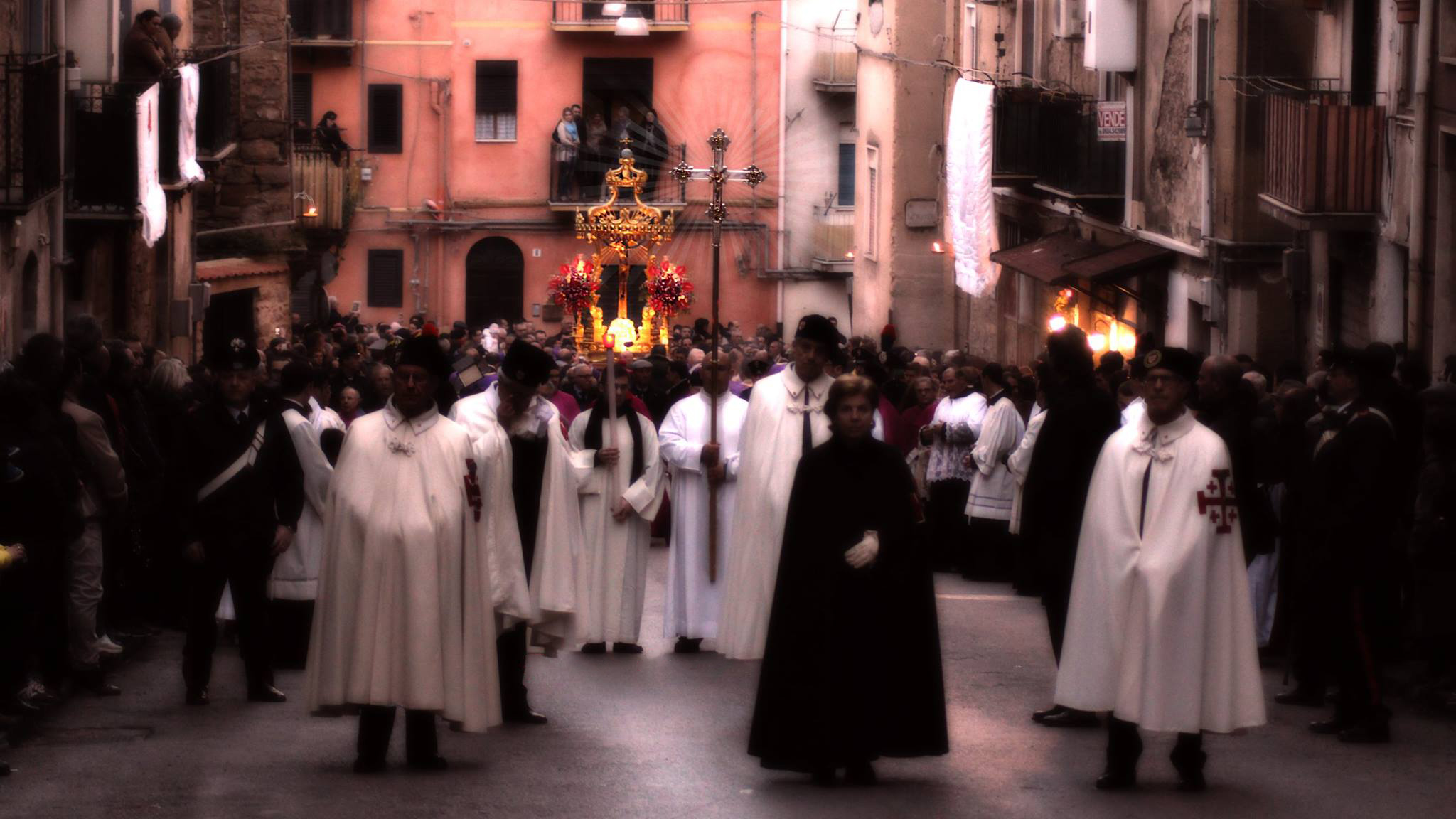
Detail

The Lord of the City, also known as the "Black Christ," is a crucifix made of ebony wood carried in procession through the oldest quarters of the historic center on the evening of Good Friday. Known to locals as the Lord of the City, it was Caltanissetta’s sole Patron until 1625, when the title was also granted to Saint Michael the Archangel. Its origins are uncertain, but it appears not to be the work of a professional sculptor but rather of a simple devotee, as evidenced by notable disproportions in Christ’s body. Legend, however, claims it was found in a cave by two Fogliamari (or Figliamari), a Sicilian term for wild herb gatherers, and darkened over centuries due to the smoke from numerous candles offered by the faithful.

The procession begins at sunset when the Black Christ (so named for the dark hue of the wood) is painstakingly carried out through the portal of the Church of the Lord of the City near the San Francesco district, one of the city’s oldest areas where most of the procession takes place. Awaiting it, alongside numerous faithful, is the full Real Maestranza, which escorts the procession with mourning banners and lances wrapped in black ribbons, and especially the Fogliamari. The latter scatter incense along the route and accompany the procession with their characteristic mournful chants: the Lamentanze. The statue, topped by a heavy golden canopy, is borne on the shoulders of the barefoot Fogliamari as a sign of penance, followed by numerous barefoot faithful and the entire clergy. Throughout the route—covering Via Signore della città, Viale Amedeo, Via Roma, Via Presidente Mauro Tumminelli, Via Paolo Emiliani Giuduci, Largo Badia, Via Re d'Italia, Corso Umberto, Piazza Garibaldi, Via Camillo Genovese, Via Roma, Viale Amedeo, Via Signore della città—balconies and windows are draped with purple coverings, and aside from the Lamentanze, little else breaks the devotional silence enveloping the procession.

== Holy Saturday ==
Until the early 2000s, the Scinnenza was performed on the evening of Holy Saturday to maintain the proper chronological order of Jesus’ passion and death. However, by episcopal decision, the sacred representation was shifted to different days, as described above, leaving Holy Saturday free and respecting the silence and mourning from Good Friday to the Resurrection Sunday. Thus, Saturday remains the only "empty" day of Holy Week.

== Easter Sunday ==
The Resurrection procession, established in the late 1970s, takes place on the morning of Easter Sunday. At 9:00 AM, the Real Maestranza, led by its Captain, heads to the bishop’s residence, wearing white gloves, ties, and stockings as a sign of joy for the Resurrection of Jesus, accompanied by the cheerful marches of the musical band. The Bishop reviews the maestranza and, alongside the Captain, leads the procession to the Cathedral. At noon, the Bishop blesses the crowd in Piazza Garibaldi, and a Maestranza representative releases white doves into the sky. After the solemn Mass in the Cathedral, the Captain returns the city keys to the Mayor.

On Easter evening, the third and final act of the Scinnenza is performed, marking the conclusion of the entire Holy Week: the Via Dolorosa with Christ’s body, the visit of the apostles to Mary, including the temptations of the Virgin, and the Resurrection of Christ.

== See also ==
- Holy Week
- Easter

== Bibliography ==
- "Settimana Santa e Vare di Caltanissetta" [Holy Week and Vare of Caltanissetta]. Registro Eredità Immateriali della Regione Siciliana. Archived from the original on 22 May 2022.
- "Caltanissetta". Europassione per l'Italia.
- Rosanna Zaffuto Rovello (2010). "Le origini della Maestranza nissena. Ipotesi di ricerca" [The Origins of the Maestranza of Caltanissetta. Research Hypotheses] (PDF). Archivio Nisseno (in Italian) (6): 5–12.
- Evelin Milazzo (2010). "La Real Maestranza e la Settimana Santa a Caltanissetta: uno sguardo antropologico" [The Real Maestranza and Holy Week in Caltanissetta: An Anthropological Perspective] (PDF). Archivio Nisseno (in Italian) (6): 59–96.
- Falzone, Vincenzo. La Sacra Urna. le Vare del Giovedì Santo [The Holy Urn. The Vare of Holy Thursday] (in Italian).
- Alesso, Michele (1903). Il Giovedì Santo in Caltanissetta [Holy Thursday in Caltanissetta] (in Italian). Caltanissetta: A. Forni.
- Pulci, Francesco (1898). La Settimana Santa in Caltanissetta [Holy Week in Caltanissetta] (in Italian). Caltanissetta: Tipografia dell’Ospizio Provinciale di Beneficienza.
- Miceli, Francesco. I Riti della Settimana Santa a Caltanissetta [The Rites of Holy Week in Caltanissetta] (in Italian).
