= Scilla (name) =

Scilla may refer to the following people

== Given name ==
- Scilla Gabel (born 1938), Italian film, television and stage actress

== Surname ==
- Agostino Scilla (1629–1700), Italian painter, paleontologist and geologist
- Fulco Luigi Ruffo-Scilla (1840–1895), Italian Cardinal of the Holy Roman Church
- Guglielmo Scilla (born 1987), Italian actor and writer
- Luigi Ruffo-Scilla (1750–1832), Italian Cardinal of the Holy Roman Church

== See also ==
- Scilla (disambiguation)
- Scylla (disambiguation)
- Priscilla
- Silla (name)
- Sillah
- Sylla
