= Scylla (disambiguation) =

Scylla is a monster from Greek mythology traditionally located at today's town of Scilla, Calabria.

Scylla may also refer to:

- Scylla (crustacean), a genus of swimming crabs including the economically important Scylla serrata
- ScyllaDB, a NoSQL database
- Scylla (mythology), several figures from Greek mythology unrelated to the monster
- Scylla (entertainer), American drag artist also known as Scylla Kone
- Scylla (comics), a fictional character in DC Comics
- Scylla (Gatti), an opera first performed in the Paris Opera in 1701
- Scylla (Hugo), a character from the Hugo franchise, and an evil witch who is hungry for power
- Scylla (mountain), a summit in California
- Scylla Mountain, a summit in British Columbia
- "Scylla" (Prison Break episode), Prison Break's season four premiere
- HMS Scylla, a number of ships of the British Royal Navy
- Siege of Scylla, two sieges of the fortress of Scilla, Calabria, in July 1806 and January 1808
- Operation Scylla, a 1943 Italian naval operation in the Second World War
- 155 Scylla, an asteroid
- Henry David "Hank" Levy aka "Doc" aka "Scylla" a character in the Marathon Man and Brothers novels and the Marathon Man film
- A band fronted by Toni Halliday
- Scylla, one of the 17 Titans from the 2019 film King of the Monsters

== See also ==
- Scilla (disambiguation)
- Silla (name)
- Sillah
- Sylla
