= Silla (name) =

Silla may refer to the following people:

== Given name ==
- Silla Bjerrum, Danish restaurateur

== Surname ==
- Agostino Scilla (1629–1700), Italian painter, also known as Silla
- Arman-Marshall Silla (born 1994), Belarusian taekwondo athlete
- Felix Silla (1937–2021), Italian stuntman and actor
- Titina Silla (1943–1973), Guinea-Bissauan activist
- Virginie Besson-Silla (born 1972), French film producer

== See also ==
- Scilla (name)
- Scylla (disambiguation)
- Sillah
- Sulla
- Sylla
- Priscilla
