= Sant'Agata al Collegio, Caltanissetta =

Roman Catholic church in Sicily, Italy

Coordinates: 37.49166°N 14.06228°E

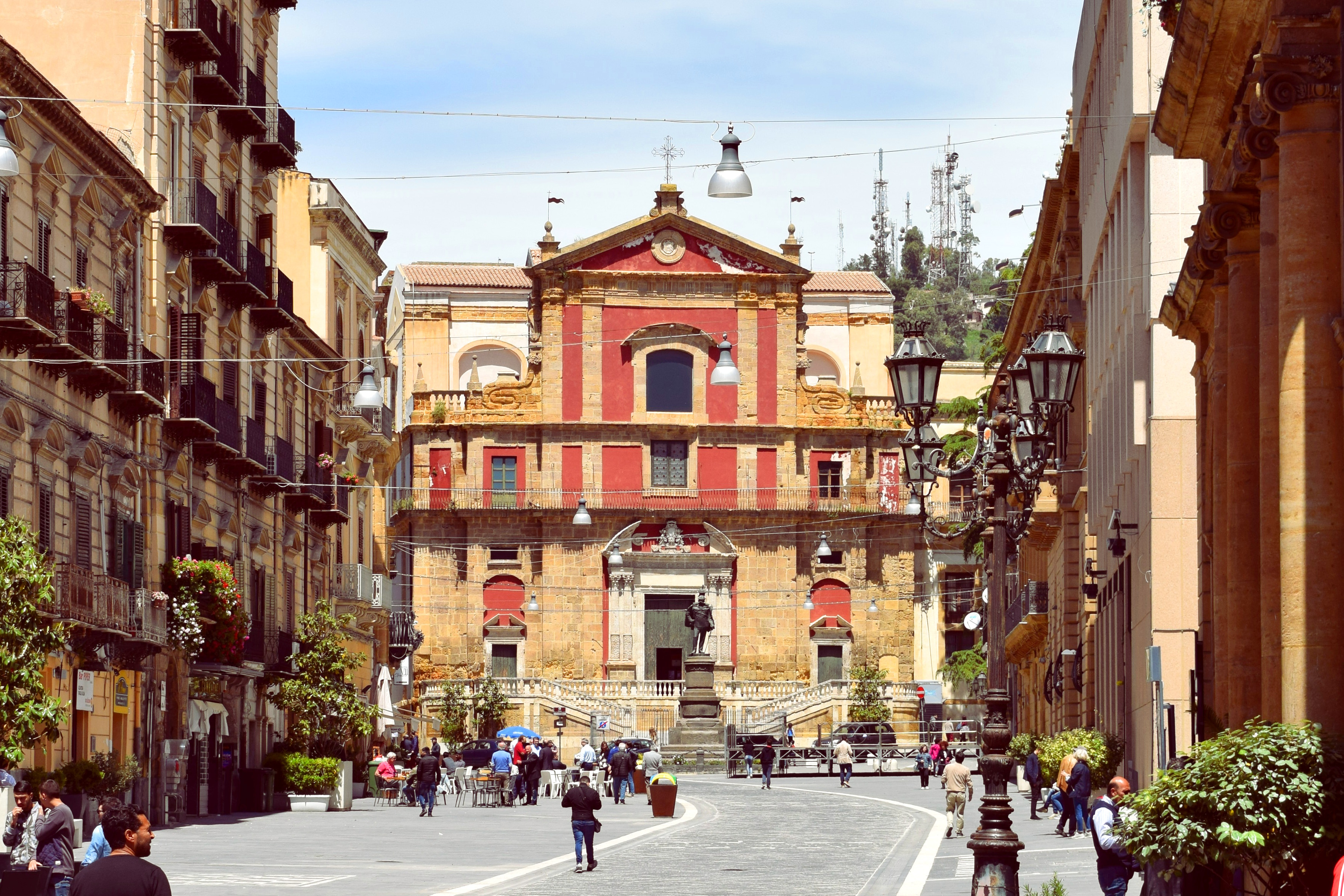
Facade of church.

Sant'Agata al Collegio is a Roman Catholic church building at the end of Corso Umberto, intersection with via Re D'Italia, in the town of Caltanissetta, in the province of same name, Sicily.

== History ==
The church was erected by the Jesuit order that likely arrived to the town in the late 16th-century under the patronage of Luisa Moncada and her son Francesco II. The church was adjacent to a newly established college run by the Jesuits. Construction began in 1588 with designs by the Jesuit Alfio Vinci, and completed in 1628 with modifications by the architect Natale Massuccio.

The facade is approached by a scenographic staircase bifurcated into two balustraded flights. In front of the church is a bronze statue of a standing King Umberto I of Italy, who visited the town in 1881. The bronze statue was made by the sculptor Michele Tripisciano in 1911, and installed in 1922. The three portals have Baroque broken tympanum. The walls of the first story are rusticated stone, while the second story has earthy colored plaster framed by pilasters and windows. Coiled volutes connect the center to the side aisles. The heraldic shield above the central portal was sculpted by Ignazio Marabitti.

The interior has a square nave with four lateral chapels. The interior stucco was completed in 1647 by the brothers Giacomo and Giuseppe Serpotta. Some of the decoration is in marble, other is in painted stucco copying marble. The apse altar is a rich polychrome marble arrangement with an altarpiece depicting the Martyrdom of St Agatha by Agostino Scilla, flanked by two stucco sculptures. The first chapel on the left is dedicated to St Anne, and was frescoed by Luigi Borremans; the first altarpiece on the right is dedicated to the Madonna del Carmelo, with an altarpiece in pietra dura. The altar dedicated to St Ignatius depicts the saint amid gilded rays of sun, below him are symbolic representations of four continents known at the time: Africa (Lion); Asia (Dromedary); America (quiver); and Europe (papal tiara). The altar is an exuberant pietra dura panel, rich in bird decor.
