= Antonio Madiona =

Italian painter

Antonio Madiona (died 1719) was an Italian painter of the Baroque period.

== Biography ==
He was born and died in Siracusa. He trained under Agostino Scilla in Messina, but along with Scilla, he was a protagonist in the complex artisan revolt in Messina of 1674, that overthrew the rule by the patrician aristocracy. Ultimately with the Habsburg capture of the city, he fled or was exiled to Rome, where he went to work in the studio first of Carlo Maratta, then with Mattia Preti.

He first traveled to Malta, then returned to Sicily, painting in Palermo and Messina. In Catania, along with Paolo Albertoni Romano, he painted frescoes for the church of Santa Caterina da Siena. He also painted portraits. In Siracusa he painted a St Eustachius for the church of the monastery of Monte Vergini. He also painted a St Francis Xavier and St Joseph for the Jeusuit church in Siracusa.
