= San Domenico, Caltanissetta =

Church building in Caltanissetta, Italy

Coordinates: 37.48914°N 14.06641°E

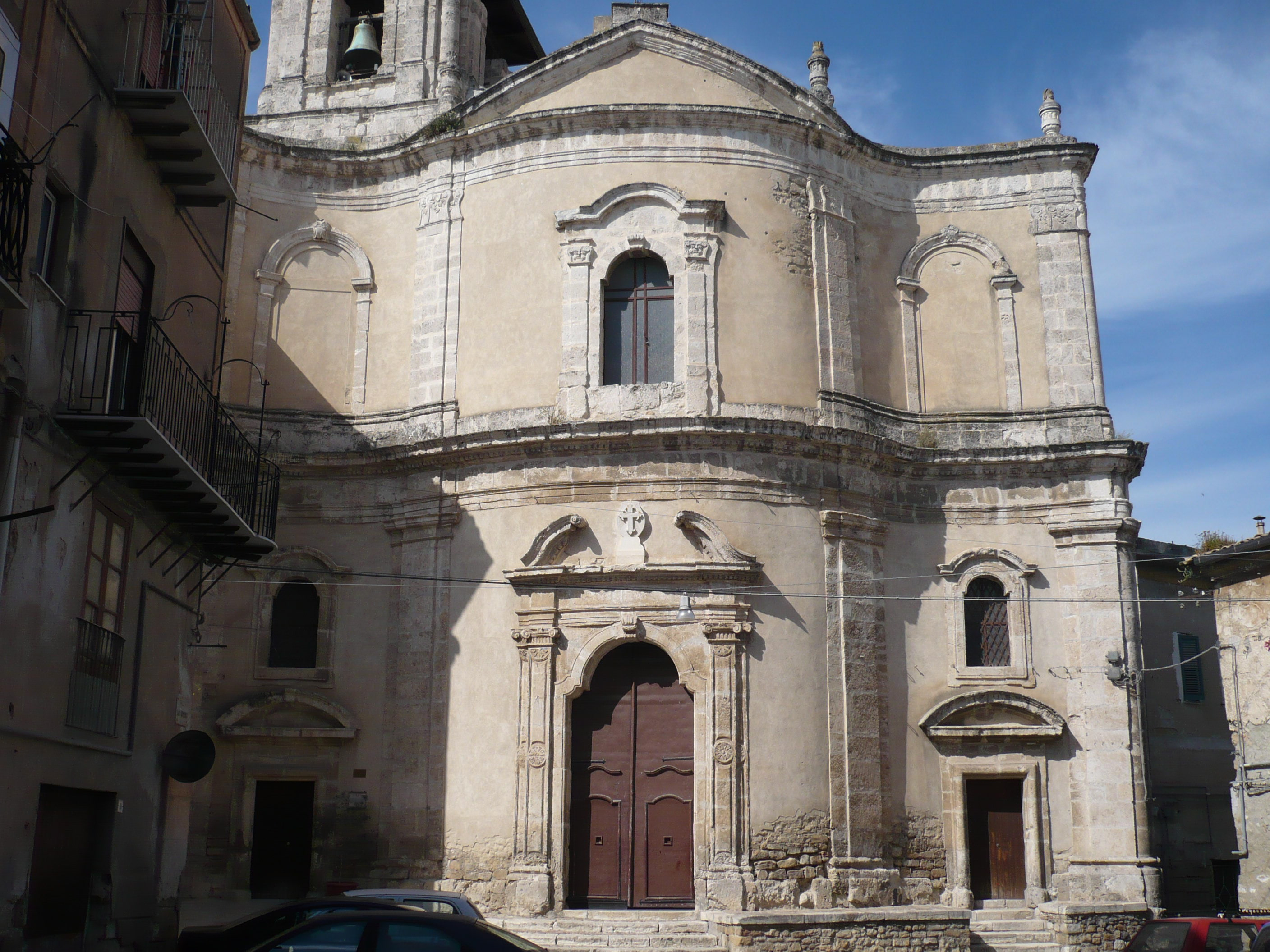
Facade of San Domenico

San Domenico is a Baroque-style Roman Catholic church in the town of Caltanissetta, Sicily.

During the second half of the 15th-century a Dominican convent was erected in the area. Giovanni da Cursu was prior by 1475. Around this time, a church was added. The patrons who brought the order to the town may have been from the House of Montcada, the Aragonese feudal lords of the region. In 1566, Don Francesco Moncada, 1st Prince of Paterno, was buried here.

The portal has a convex facade with concave wings. The baroque portal is flanked by stone pilasters, and surmounted by a broken tympanum. The church was also affiliated with the Confraternity of the Rosary, and who commissioned the main altarpiece depicting the Madonna del Rosario (1614), painted by Filippo Paladini.
