= Scarabelli library =

Library in Italy

Coordinates: 37.4921°N 14.0621°E

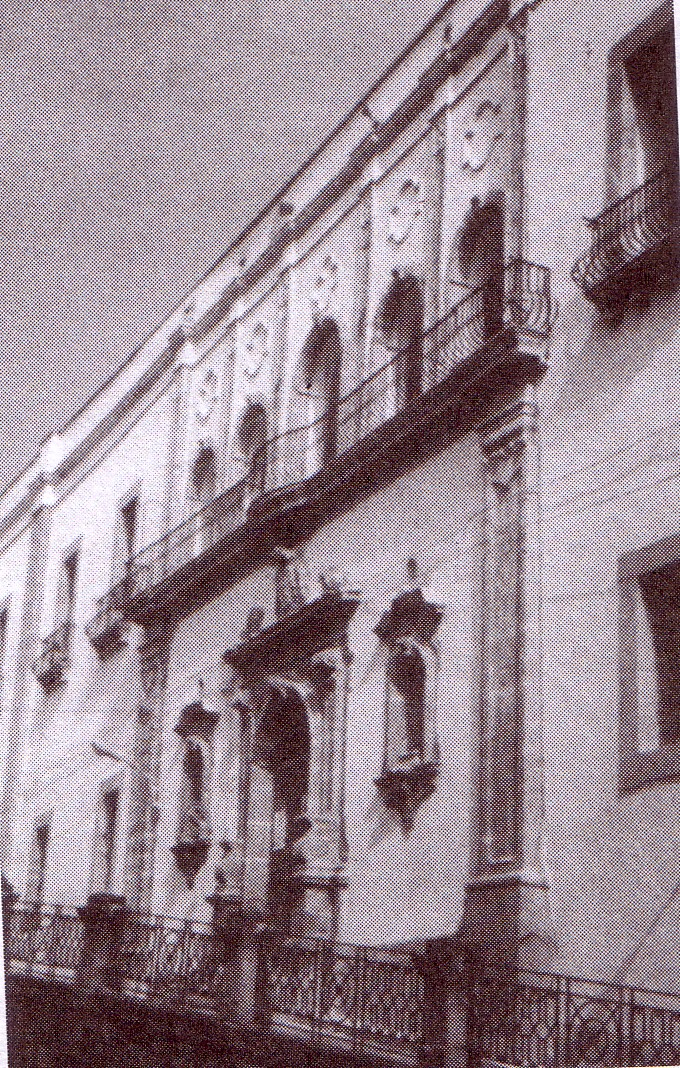

The Scarabelli library is the public library in the city of Caltanissetta in the centre of the island of Sicily, Italy. In 1862, the library was established by Antonio Mordini in the premises of the former Jesuit convent.

== History ==
The original core of the library was founded on many donations and acquisitions; it was named after Luciano Scarabelli on 12 May 1882 because of his enlightened generosity. He donated many volumes to which were added to books and archives derived from religious orders in the area, that had undergone suppression over the past decades.

Also contributing to the formation of the library were the abbot Girolamo Maria, (born Pietro Guadagno di Caltanissetta); the prefect Domenico Marco d'Ivrea; professor Luciano Scarabelli from Piacenza; and the Nisseno librarian Calogero Manasia. Among its collections, the library houses 11 incunabula of philosophical and religious argument dated back to 1476-1496, 2 scrolls, 1042 works from the 16th century, and 281 manuscripts.

== History ==
The library was established with the 264th decree by Antonio Mordini in 1862. In the same year, Domenico Marco d'Ivrea, first prefect of Caltanissetta, launched a public appeal to all the religious orders, public institutions, patrician families and professionals to donate volumes for the library which was being built in Caltanissetta. The library was opened to the public in 1888 after a first allocation from the Comune and thanks to the preparations of the priest librarian Calogero Manasia.

=== The private donations ===
Despite the resistance of many religious orders and the bishop of that time, many sustained the initiative donating volumes accordingly to their social prestige. Among the most important donations the following stand out those by:

- Cardinal prior Dusmet of the Order of Saint Benedict (Benedettini Cassinesi) order from Catania
- Liborio Navarra from Castrogiovanni
- Prince Resuttano
- Princess Montevago
- Editor Nicola Zanichelli from Modena
- Barons Chiaromonte and Bordonaro from Palermo

Other volumes were donated by local citizens (Nisseni), such as:

- Baron of the Benedettini Cassinesi order from Caltanissetta
- Baron Lanzirotti
- Baron Di Figlia
- Baron Canalotti

and others were bought with public funds of the Comune by citizens.

=== The seizures to the religious orders ===
The most conspicuous and valuable contribution was that of the old religious orders. In fact, a ministerial decree in 1867 gave a total of 12,367 books taken from the holdings of the holy orders in Caltanissetta.

The religious orders which contributed with their volumes were: the Capuchin order for the majority of works, the Riformati order, the Sant'Antonio of Santissima Maria degli Angeli order, the Benedictine order of Santa Flavia, the Discalced Augustinians, the Brothers Hospitallers of St. John of God (Fatebenefratelli order), the Dominicans and the Jesuits. The books were delivered on 9 October 1867 except those of the Society of Jesus.

In fact, 1469 volumes from the Jesuits became part of the library fund only in 1889 after being eventually found under the roof of the Sant'Agata Church adjacent to the library building. The books had been hidden there to avoid the seizure when the Jesuits left in 1860 when Giuseppe Garibaldi expelled the Congregation of the Most Holy Redeemer and the Society of Jesus order on 17 June because of their active involvement in higher education which was exclusively granted the King of Naples.

The books were delivered to the library through the intercession of the Minister of Education Boselli who knew the library well and appreciated it.

=== Luciano Scarabelli's donations ===
The most important donation is that of the scholarly Luciano Scarabelli, professor of Aesthetics at the University of Bologna. Between 1862 and 1875 he donated more than 2,500 volumes to the library with several consignments. The town council decided to give his name to the library on 12 May 1882 in acknowledgement of the valuable donations that the patron had made to the city of Caltanissetta with democratic spirit. Among the books donated by Luciano Scarabelli those he received as gifts from the personal library of his teacher Piero Giordano should be mentioned. In fact, Piero Giordano gave his books to Luciano Scarabelli provided he would read, study and the donate them to someone who needed it.

=== Calogero Manasia's work ===
In 1878 the city council nominated Calogero Manasia, a priest from Resuttano, chief librarian. He directed the library between 1870 and 1905. His work was crucial to the classification and organization of the books of the old collection and of those volumes that the library kept receiving during the years. The library was open to the public only in 1888 after Manasia completed the reorganization of the books thanks to municipal financing.

Before him, the priest Vincenzo Polizzi in 1868 and the former jesuit Vincenzo Caprera in 1869-1870, simply collected the books which arrived in the library because of the ministerial decree of 9 October 1867.

== Heritage ==
The library, up to 2009, has a heritage of 142.166 volumes, 69 journals and 281 manuscripts. Moreover, it has a collection of historic works that comprises 1.042 works of the 1500s, 11 philosophical and religious incunabula dated 1476-1496 (one of these is linked to Pico della Mirandola), and 2 parchments.

On 8 September 2010, it was reported that the precious 17th century Psalterium diurnum had been stolen on 3 September 2010.

=== Collections and sections ===
The heritages of several private individuals have been collected in the library. Many collections have consequently been created, many organised by subject, others by historical relevance:

- Scarabelli collection, one of the most important for its size with over 2500 volumes;
- the Pietro Giordani collection (Literature), containing books that Giordani had donated to its pupil Scarabelli (who in turn donated them to Caltanissetta);
- Mulè-Bèrtolo Giovanni collection (Local history), with 4000 publications collected in 556 bound volumes;
- Pulci Francesco collection (Religion);
- Le Moli collection (Law) containing 119 volumes;
- Sanna Luigi collection (Humanities) with 2618 volumes;
- Canonical collection;
- Banca d'Italia collection with 1858 volumes.

Special sections:

- local history;
- youth;
- periodicals and daily newspapers;
- the Rotary International archive.

=== The old collection ===
Since the beginning, the Scarabelli Library could beneficiate of books arrived from various religious congregations. 12,367 books have this origin and today it is difficult to assign each book to the congregation from which it came. These books were collected in the old fun by the librarian Manasia. He was the first to think of and create a catalogue of the books received by the library.

The origin of the books:

- The books of the Capuchins came from the convent in Contrada Pigni, established in 1540, which became the Vittorio Emanuele II Hospital in 1905.
- The books of the Cassinese congregation came from the Monastero of Santa Flavia, established in 1592.
- The books of the Dominican order came from the San Domenico convent established in the 15th century.
- The books of the Discalced Carmelites order arrived from the Convento del Carmine, which later became the Palazzo del Carmine - Municipio established in 1371.
- The books of the Conventual Franciscans order came from the convent of San Francis established in 1507.
- The books of the Discalced Augustinians order arrived from the convent of Santa Maria delle Grazie established in 1623.
- Other books are those of the Antoniani di Sant'Agostino (1637) and those of the Minori Osservanti order of Santa Maria degli Angeli (1507).

== The Librarians ==
The list of the librarians of the Scarabelli Library since its establishment is as follows:

1. Vincenzo Polizzi 1868
2. Vincenzo Caprera from 1869 to 1870
3. Calogero Manasia from 1870 to 1905
4. Alfonso Guarneri until 27 June 1910
5. Giuseppe Geraci until 22 February 1927
6. Eugenio Mulè until December 1835
7. Attilio Noto until March 1939
8. Michele Palermo from 1939 to 1940
9. Salvatore Piccillo from 1940 to 1946
10. Salvatore Gruttadauria from 1946 to 1981
11. vacancy since 1981

== Bibliography ==
- Vitellaro, Antonio (2009). Breve storia della biblioteca comunale "Luciano Scarabelli" di Caltanissetta. Caltanissetta, Italy: Paruzzo Printer.
