= Brothers (Goldman novel) =

1986 novel by William Goldman

- First edition
- Author: William Goldman
- Language: English
- Publisher: Warner Books
- Publication date: 1986
- Publication place: United States
- Pages: 310
- ISBN: 0-446-51279-6

Brothers is a 1986 thriller novel by William Goldman. It is the sequel to his 1974 novel Marathon Man and is Goldman's final novel. The United States publisher was Warner Books.

It was published in the United Kingdom by Grafton.

Daniel Woodrell wrote in The Washington Post that "The ultimate significance of the title becomes clear only in the surprising, explosive twist at the end." The BBC later aired a radio adaptation.

It had mixed reviews, with Goldman himself rating it unfavorably. As of 2025, unlike Marathon Man, no film version of this book has been made.

== Plot ==
In the sequel, Henry David "Hank" Levy (nicknamed "Doc" and "Scylla"), brother of Marathon Man's protagonist Thomas Babington "Tom" Levy (a.k.a. "Babe"), survives his stabbing. The plot concerns an effort to instigate World War III by means of simultaneous, worldwide terrorist attacks, which Scylla attempts to stop. Scylla's job is to kill American scientists who made three inventions meant to give the United States a military advantage against the Soviet Union. There are two factions in the U.S. government, the Bloodies, advocating war, and Godists, who wish for more peaceful methods.

Scylla initially convalesces on an island, as he had been in recovery for a decade. He later goes to New York State, both New York City and Upstate New York. At Princeton University he kills "Arky" Vaughan, who made the suicide chemical, while in New York he kills Milo Standish, who created a chemical that makes other people do his wishes.

After "Ma" Perkins, the spy who helped him recover, is murdered, Scylla goes to London. Scylla initially only knows of two inventions, but learns about the third after Ma's death. Scylla kills the Blond, Perkins's killer, and Division head Beverage dies from suicide after Scylla confronts him.

The final invention is exploding children made to kill important politicians and scientists to goad major world powers into attacking each other so the United Kingdom, left standing, could rule the world. Beverage had already sent exploding children, but they largely detonate prematurely and the mutual retaliation fails to materialize. Babe's wife, Melissa, has been hired by a facility in England ostensibly to fine-tune speech of amusement park props - in reality, the exploding children. Scylla, not knowing her identity, kills her. When Babe and Scylla meet, they embrace and cry.

== Background ==
Goldman later recalled, "I'd written one sequel before, which was Father's Day, and I had this notion that Doc wasn't dead and I thought, 'Shit, I'll bring him back and see what happens.'

Goldman stopped writing novels after the publication of Brothers:

It was one of those funny things. It just ended. It came as a shock to me. I don't know what happened. My wife left me the next year and that certainly was a change... When I was a novelist - those thirty years - something comes along and hits you and you think, 'Oh my God, that might be interesting,' but I haven't had an idea for that for twenty years now. If I started writing a novel tomorrow it wouldn't shock me because, as we all know, it's all instinctive.

Goldman wrote 16 published novels in the 30 years from 1957 though 1986. Though he lived another 32 years after Brothers appeared, he never wrote another novel.

== Characters ==
- Henry David "Doc" Levy a.k.a. Scylla - The main character, he is rescued from the events in Marathon Man and recovers. He no longer has fingerprints, he received a facelift, and his voice is different. Ma Perkins crafts him so he can be an assassin that cannot be tracked down. Kirkus Reviews described him as "laconic" and states that the character is "firmly unengaging as he moves from one hand-to-hand combat to the next."
- "Ma" Perkins - The person who fixes Scylla/Doc, and Doc's direct supervisor, Perkins is described by Dick Lochte of the Los Angeles Times as "an immense spymaster". Perkins, called "rotund" by the West Coast Review of Books, likes eating food from the Carnegie Deli, and is married to a quadriplegic woman. Perkins is murdered.
- Hondo - An assassin who causes his victims to fall or be crushed. He is competitive.
- Cheetah - An assassin who kills with an artificial claw. He is competitive.
- Beverage - The top official at the Division. Stephen Dobyns wrote in The New York Times that Beverage's defining trait is that he wished to have "a comic book zap gun so he could disintegrate those who displeased him" and that if this was the case the number of people on Earth would plummet.
- The Blond - An assassin who removes faces from people with his knife after making them into "forms". Lochte describes him as "narcissistic". Publishers Weekly describes him as "almost superhuman".
- J.F. "Arky" Vaughan a.k.a. Uncle Arky - A scientist who created a chemical that causes people to commit suicide. His name is a reference to a baseball player, Arky Vaughan. He kills his nephew, Scout, and his nephew's girlfriend.
- Milo Standish - A scientist who created a chemical that makes other people do his wishes. He makes a man against homosexuality receive anal sex. Freelance writer Shirley K. Murray wrote in The Courier-Journal that he initially shows a "mild and innocuous manner".
- Stan and Ollie - They are brothers, ages 8 and 6, in Tring, Hertfordshire, England, who like to eat chocolate. Woodrell describes them as "cute". The brothers die in an explosion at the end of the second chapter. The novel later reveals they are artificial exploding children.
- Arnie - A former boxer who regularly has sex with his girlfriend, Connie, and in New York City they regularly victimize men attracted to Connie. Woodrell describes him as a "brittle-handed ex-pug" and her as a "healthily endowed tease". They take in Standish believing they will victimize him. Arnie has hatred of homosexuals, but Standish uses the chemical to make him have sex with another man, while Standish has sex with Connie.
- Scott "Scout" - A high school student from Neptune, New Jersey who is in a relationship with his girlfriend Audrey and is soon to attend university. He travels to Harlem to play basketball games, and is described by Woodrell as "a whitebread hoop hopeful". He plays in the game, as he hoped, but he and his girlfriend later commit suicide after they drink Arky's drink, which the latter ostensibly gave him as a toast to his future. They are victims of Arky's suicide chemical.
- Thomas Babington "Babe" Levy - He is Scylla's brother and a Columbia University associate professor of history. For much of the book he is oblivious to the events occurring. Daniel Woodrell of The Washington Post states that he is present to give Scylla/Doc "a humanizing concern."
  - Multiple reviewers stated that Babe's role in the storyline was not significant and/or minor. Dobyns wrote that Babe is in the novel "only to be emotionally destroyed" and that he does not have a use in the plot, nor does he propel the plot forward. Woodrell also stated that Babe was "unnecessary" to the plot, and Kirkus Reviews described his role as "minor". Lochte stated that Babe's "role here, though essential, is definitely a secondary one." Christopher Lehmann-Haupt wrote in The New York Times that Babe and his wife "do figure vaguely" into the storyline "but they're so far from being essential that one has to suspect that Mr. Goldman included them just to remind us of Marathon Man."
- Melissa - Babe's wife and a philologist, she is the daughter of one of Babe's former professors. Lochte described Melissa as "levelheaded and beautiful". The novel reveals that she was working on fine-tuning the speech of the robotic children in the Tring building that Scylla destroyed. Woodrell argued that Melissa's role in the ending "seems forced."

== Reception ==
Woodrell described it as "a fast-paced, mayhem-filled, occasionally funny, frequently clever novel." Lochte called it "Sneaky, diabolic, a bit depraved, disturbing, maddening, heartbreaking, manipulative and fascinating." Kirkus Reviews stated that "Goldman's slick delivery[...]provides fairly painless reading" but that Brothers did not have "the memorable punch of Marathon Man." Lehmann-Haupt wrote that the author "bewilders us as to his ultimate aims, and seeks to keep us entertained in the meantime with gimmicks" but that it does not "[puzzle the reader] constructively." The West Coast Review of Books ranked it three of five stars (a "good" review) and stated that it was "a bona fide page-turner." Tom Shippey of The Guardian referred to it as having a high level of violence, described it as "implausible" as well as "cunning" and "quirky". Barry Seddon of the Manchester Evening News stated that the book is "totally satisfying", though he argued that it sometimes "it feels like a film synopsis".

Dobyns said Brothers "is hardly a novel at all but a comic book without pictures, something along the lines of Masters of the Universe. Even the characters have similar names... [it] isn't a novel at all but a book about killing." Publishers Weekly also gave a negative review, stating that it was not a good sequel and "the book's basic premise fails to hold together." Murray wrote that it was mostly "disjointed and agonizingly slow" even though the author used "wit, much of it directed at his own wildly imaginative ploys."

Goldman himself later called it "a not-very-terrific book."

Scott Bettencourt of Film Score Monthly wrote that the book was "a disappointment".
