= Sillah =

Sillah is surname. Notable people with that name include:

- Ahmad Tejan Sillah, Sierra Leonean imam
- Foday Sillah (sprinter) (born 1974), Sierra Leonean sprinter
- Foday Sillah (marabout), Gambian religious and political leader in the 19th century
- Mohamed Sillah, Sierra Leonean politician
- Mohamed Sillah (footballer) (born 1983), Sierra Leonean footballer
- Sadiq Sillah (born 1969), Sierra Leonean politician

== See also ==
- Scilla (name)
- Scylla (disambiguation)
- Silla (name)
- Sylla
