= Dorsum Scilla =

Wrinkle ridge on the Moon

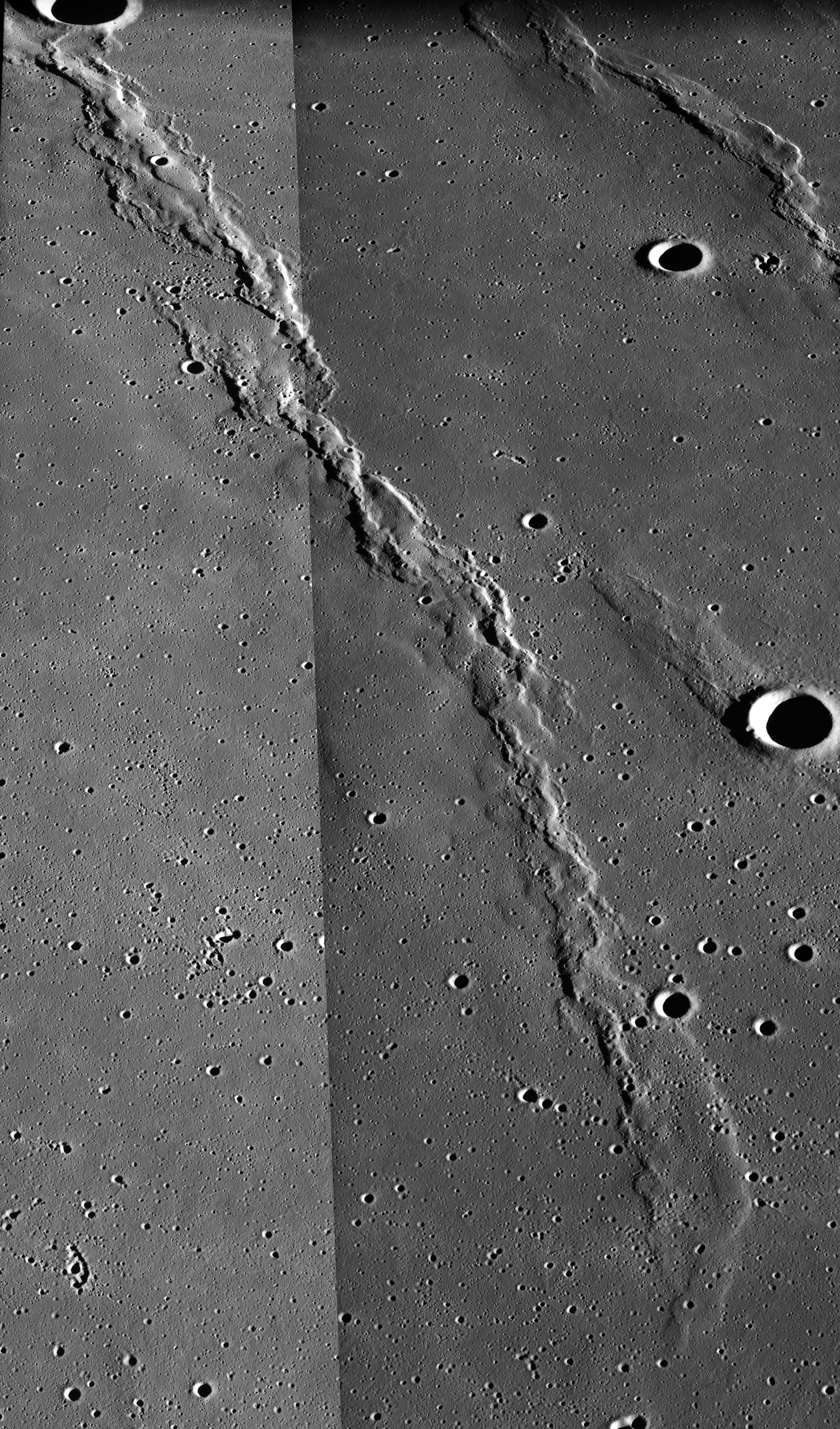
Southern Dorsum Scilla, from Apollo 15

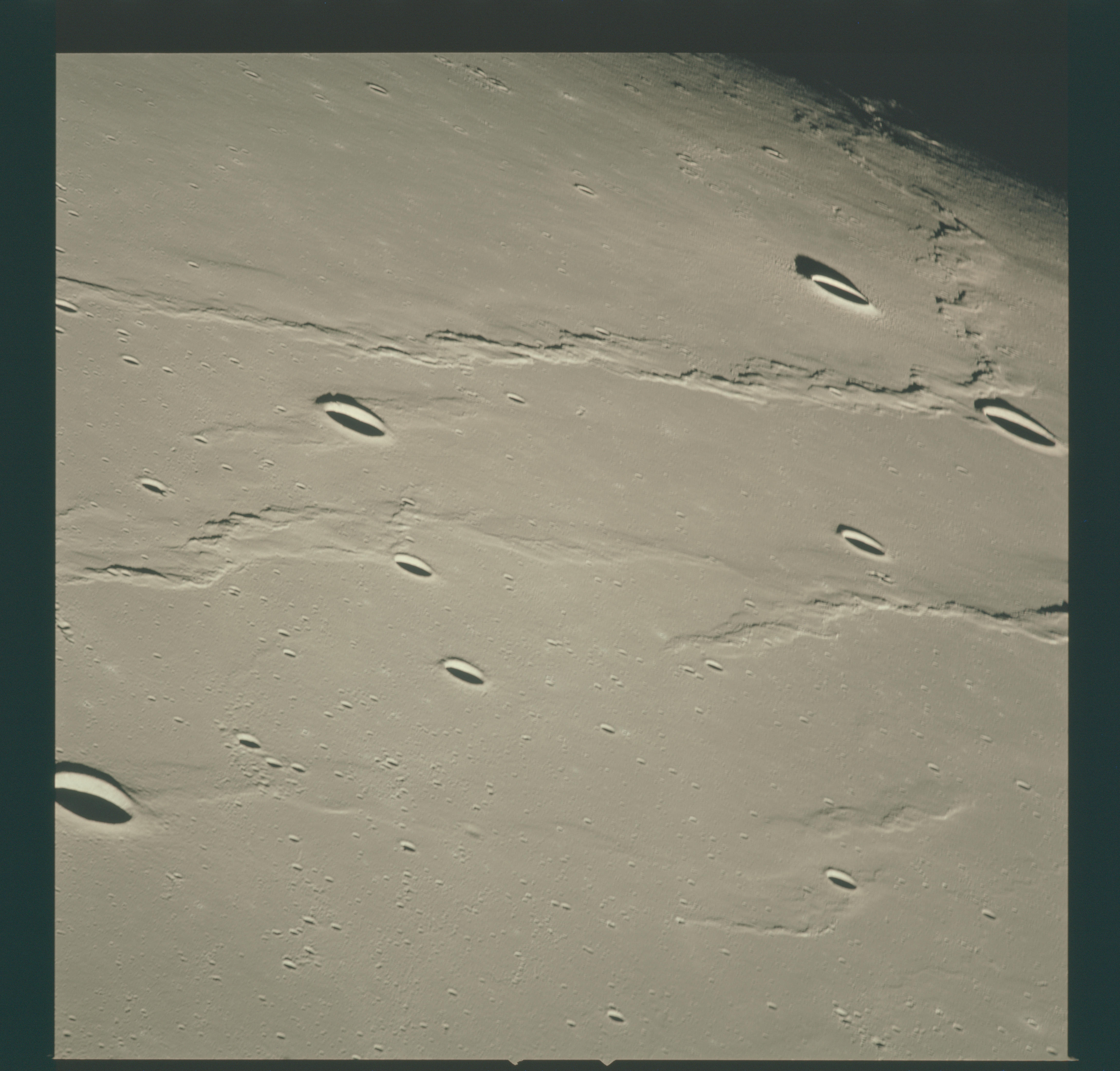
Another view also from Apollo 15

Dorsum Scilla is a wrinkle ridge at 32.8°N 60.4°W in Oceanus Procellarum on the Moon. It is 108 km long and was named after Agostino Scilla in 1976.
