= Sylla =

Sylla can refer to:

== People ==
=== Basketball players ===
- Abdel Kader Sylla (born 1990), Seychelles basketball player

=== Football players ===
- Abdoul Karim Sylla (born 1981), Guinean football player
- Abdoul Karim Sylla (born 1992), Guinean-Dutch football player
- Abdoulaye Kapi Sylla (born 1982), Guinean football player
- Fodé Sylla (footballer) (born 2006), French footballer
- Habib Sylla (born 1999), Ivorian footballer
- Issiaga Sylla (born 1994), Malian footballer
- Kanfory Sylla (born 1980), Guinean football player
- Mamadou Sylla (footballer, born 1975), Senegalese football defender
- Mamadou Sylla (footballer, born 1986), Senegalese football defender
- Mamadou Sylla (footballer, born 1994), Senegalese football forward
- Mamadou Sylla (footballer, born 2003), Spanish football midfielder
- Mohamed Ofei Sylla (born 1974), Guinean football midfielder
- Mohamed Sylla (footballer, born 1971), Guinean football striker
- Mohamed Sylla (footballer, born 1993), French football midfielder
- Mohammed Sylla (born 1977), Guinean footballer, also known as "Momo Sylla" (St. Johnstone, Celtic, Kilmarnock)
- Norman Sylla (born 1982), French football striker
- Salimo Sylla, French footballer
- Sekou Sylla (born 1999), Guinean-Dutch footballer
- Soumaïla Sylla (born 2004), Guinean footballer
- Yacouba Sylla (born 1990), Malian-French midfielder who plays for Mechelen

=== Volleyball players ===
- Myriam Sylla (born 1995), Italian wing spiker/opposite playing for Imoco Volley and the Italian national team.

=== Entertainers and writers ===
- Assa Sylla (born 1996), French actress
- Ibrahim Sylla, Senegalese music producer
- Khady Sylla, (born 1963), Senegalese writer
- Mola Sylla (born 1956), Senegalese musician
- MHD (rapper) (Mohamed Sylla, born 1994), French musician
- Richard Sylla, American financial historian

=== Politicians ===
- Albert Sylla (1909–1967), Malagasy medical doctor and politician
- Fodé Sylla (born 1963), French politician
- Jacques Sylla (1946–2009), Prime Minister of Madagascar
- Mamadou Sylla (politician) (1960–2026), Guinean politician and business leader
- M'Mahawa Sylla is a Guinean army officer.
- Talla Sylla, Senegalese politician

=== Other ===
- Alternate spelling for Lucius Cornelius Sulla, a Roman general and statesman

== See also ==
- Scilla (name)
- Scylla (disambiguation)
- Silla (name)
- Sillah
- Scylla
- Scilla
- Sulla
