= Agostino Scilla =

Italian painter and scientist (1629–1700)

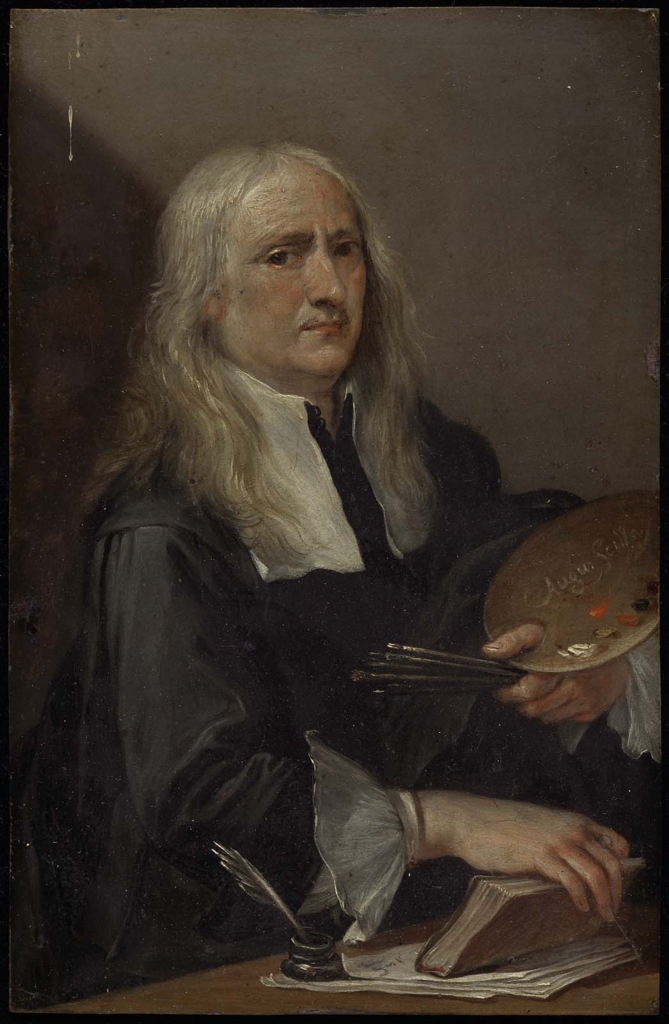
Portrait traditionally attributed to Andrea Sacchi, re-identified by historian Paula Findlen as a self-portrait of Agostino Scilla. Museum of Fine Arts, Boston.

Agostino Scilla (10 August 1629 – 31 May 1700) was an Italian Baroque painter, paleontologist, geologist, numismatist, and a pioneer in the study of fossils and in scientific illustration. In addition to his paintings, he published an early text on paleontology: La vana speculazione disingannata dal senso ("Vain Speculation Undeceived by Sense", 1670) which was introduced to English audiences by William Wotton of the Royal Society in 1696. He was among the first to promote a scientific understanding of fossils in contrast to fantastic Biblical and divine interpretations.

== Biography ==
The son of a notary in Messina in Sicily, Scilla studied under Antonio Barbalunga in Messina. Thanks to the influence of his master, he was awarded a grant by the Senate in Messina to continue his studies in Rome, where he studied under Andrea Sacchi for four years. On returning to his native city he opened a very popular academy and painted frescoes in the churches of San Domenico and of the Nunziata de' Teatini. Among his canvases are a depiction of Death of San Ilarione painted for the church of Sant'Ursula. His frescos in the Cathedral of Syracuse date from 1657.

After participating in an unsuccessful revolt against Spanish rule, in 1678 he was exiled from Sicily. Scilla worked as a painter in Turin and then Rome for the rest of his life. He was a censor in the Academy of Design in Rome in 1695.

Scilla was an excellent landscape painter ad was much admired for the realism of his portraits. Among his pupils wete the painters Antonio Madiona and Placido Celi. Agostino's brother Giacinto, and Giacinto's son Saverio, were also painters.

== Works ==
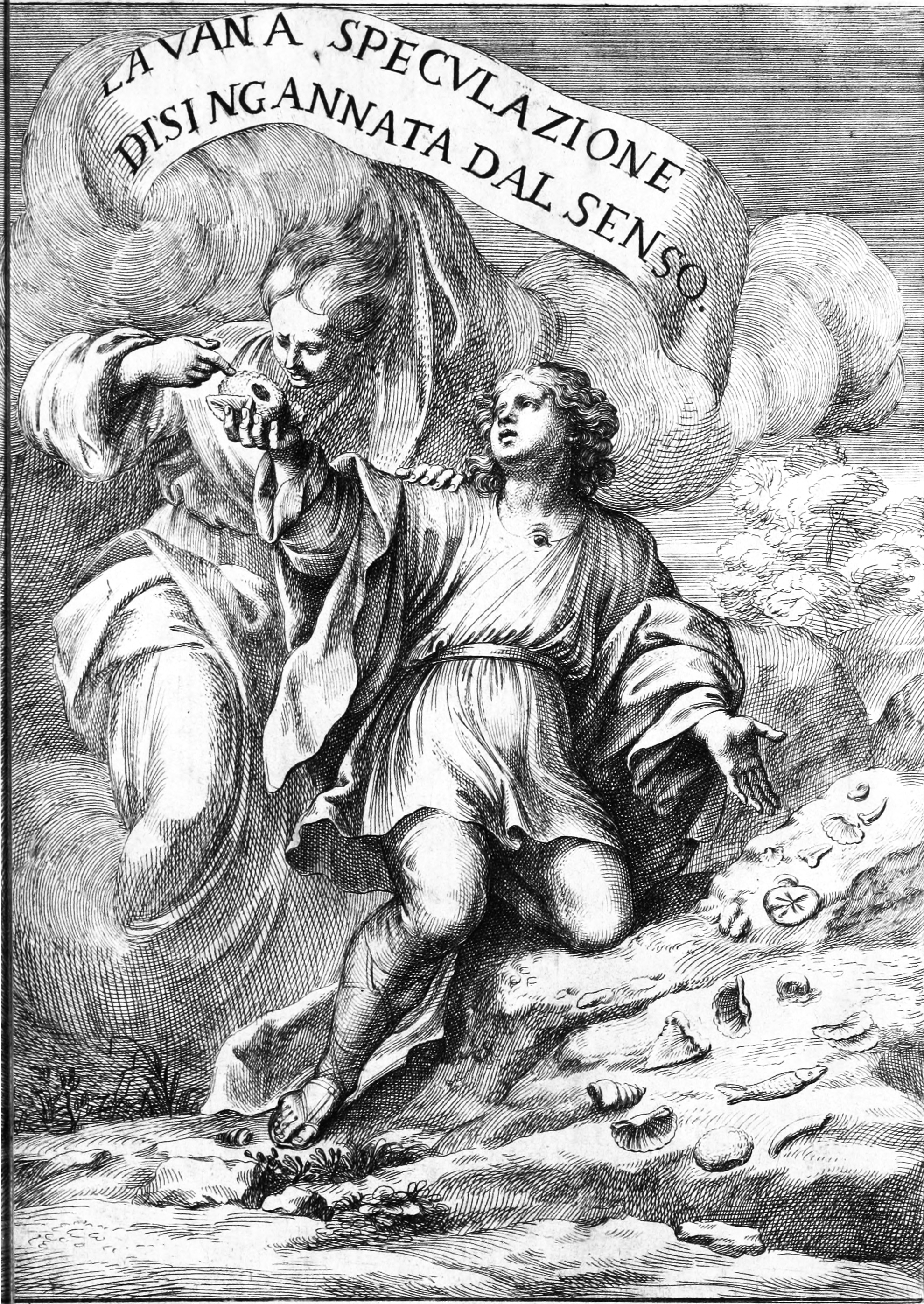
Frontispiece showing allegorical struggle between truth and speculation with truth depicted by Mercury bearing an eye of reason on the chest, holding a fossil echinoid and pointing to many more specimens

Scilla began to study fossils found in the hills of Sicily, sometimes accompanied by botanist Paolo Boccone. His only written scientific work is La vana speculazione disingannata dal senso ("Vain Speculation Undeceived by Sense", 1670). The book was dedicated to the Sicilian nobleman Don Carlo di Gregorio, who founded the Accademia della Fucina (1639–1678) in Messina. In this work Scilla argues for a scientific explanation for fossils, as opposed to them being of fantastic origin or a test of faith from God. He also correctly identified the supposedly magical objects that were called glossopetrae, or "tongue stones", as shark teeth. He was however not the first to do this. Nicolas Steno had made a similar claim about three years earlier but it is not known if Scilla had seen that work. Fabio Colonna in Dissertatio de glossopetris (1616) had burnt these fossils to show that they were made of lime, organic matter, rather than minerals. The book included 29 drawings of fossils drawn from specimens by him and engraved using copper-plate by Pietro Santi Bartoli. The book was rediscovered by William Wotton of the Royal Society in 1696 and an English summary became widely available. Scilla was apologetic about being but an untrained artist and the style of writing was commented on by Wotton as lacking art. Scilla argued that his training gave him a painter's eye with the ability to probe into nature and interpret things better, and depict nature without mediation.

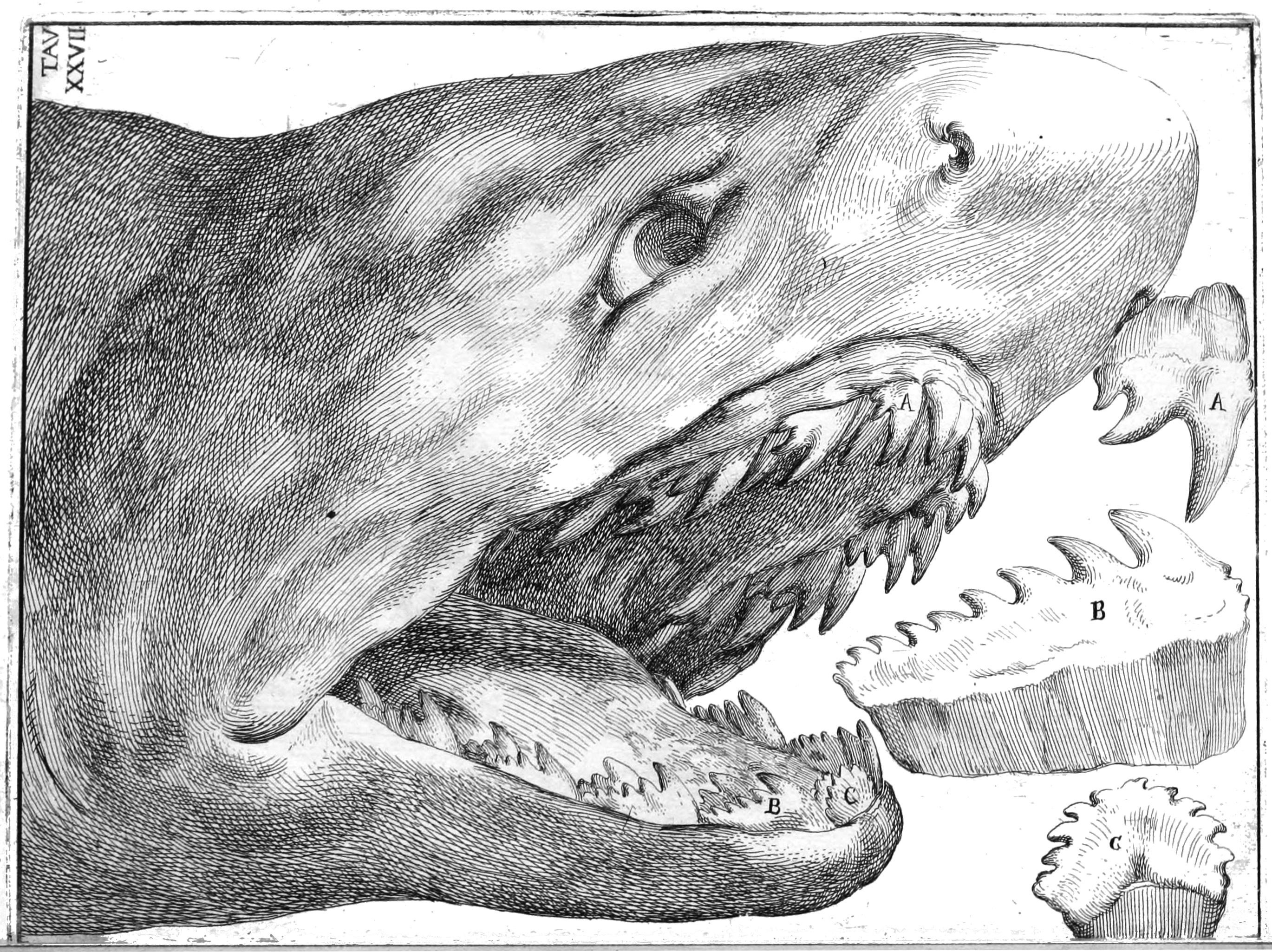
Shark teeth and glossopetrae drawn by Scilla

Scilla argued that fossils were not lusus naturae, whimsical simulacra of animals and plants created by God or divine Nature. He termed fossils as "jokes of time, not of nature." Athanasius Kircher had claimed that inanimate nature could produce pictures and sculptures that resembled living things. Girolamo Cardano claimed in his On the Subtlety of Things (1550) that he owned a piece agate that had the face of the Roman emperor Galba in it. Scilla dismissed Cardano's claim. Scilla may have seen fossil collections in Rome belonging to Cardinal Francesco Barberini (1597–1679) and his secretary Cassiano dal Pozzo (1588–1657). Scilla had also been influenced by Giovan Pietro Bellori (1613–1696) who had lectured on the role of the artist in inquiry. Bellori besought artists to go deep into a subject just as they examined the squaring of the circle and explored anatomy below the skin of the nudes they depicted, as depicted in Carlo Maratta's Tanto che basti (1682). Maratta had been a student of Sacchi alongside Scilla. Scilla gained reputation as a scientific illustrator and worked for Marcello Malpighi. Scilla is considered to have been the first to use dotted lines to indicate reconstructions in paleontological illustration. John Ray made use of some of Scilla's fossil illustrations. Scilla's fossil collection was acquired by John Woodward (1665–1728), an English physician, in 1717. These went into the University of Cambridge and became the nucleus of the collections of the Sedgwick Museum of Earth Sciences.

Dorsum Scilla on the Moon is named after him.

== See also ==
List of Italian painters
