= Agostino Lo Piano Pomar =

- Born: 24 August 1871; Caltanissetta, Italy
- Died: 17 July 1927 (aged 55); Caltanissetta, Italy
- Occupations: Sicilian lawyer, socialist and politician
- Known for: Leader of the Fasci Siciliani

Agostino Lo Piano Pomar (Caltanissetta, August 24, 1871 – Caltanissetta, July 17, 1927) was a Sicilian lawyer, socialist and politician. He was one of the national leaders of the Fasci Siciliani (Sicilian Leagues) a popular movement of democratic and socialist inspiration in 1891-1894.

He was a tireless organizer of sulfur miners in the Caltanissetta area battling for higher wages and improved working conditions. He became the leader of the Fascio dei lavoratori (Workers League) of Caltanissetta that was founded on March 18, 1893.

Lo Piano Pomar was among the 500 delegates from nearly 90 leagues and socialist circles at the Congress of the Fasci that was held in Palermo on May 21–22, 1893. A Central Committee was elected, composed of nine members: he was elected for the province of Caltanissetta. The Congress decided that all Leagues were obliged to join the Party of Italian Workers (Partito dei Lavoratori Italiani, the initial name of the Italian Socialist Party).

In 1903 he was one of the leaders of the Lega di miglioramento (League of improvement) and actively involved in the large strikes in the Trabonella and Gessolungo sulfur mines when the industry was declining.

He was elected in the Italian Chamber of Deputies in November 1913 for Caltanissetta, and re-elected in December 1919 and June 1921. He remained in the Chamber until January 25, 1924. He was under-secretary for Industry and Trade under Prime Minister Francesco Saverio Nitti and under-secretary of Education under Luigi Facta, the last Prime Minister for Italy before the takeover of Benito Mussolini.
