= Abbazia di Santo Spirito, Caltanissetta =

Church building in Caltanissetta, Italy

Coordinates: 37.50651°N 14.07624°E

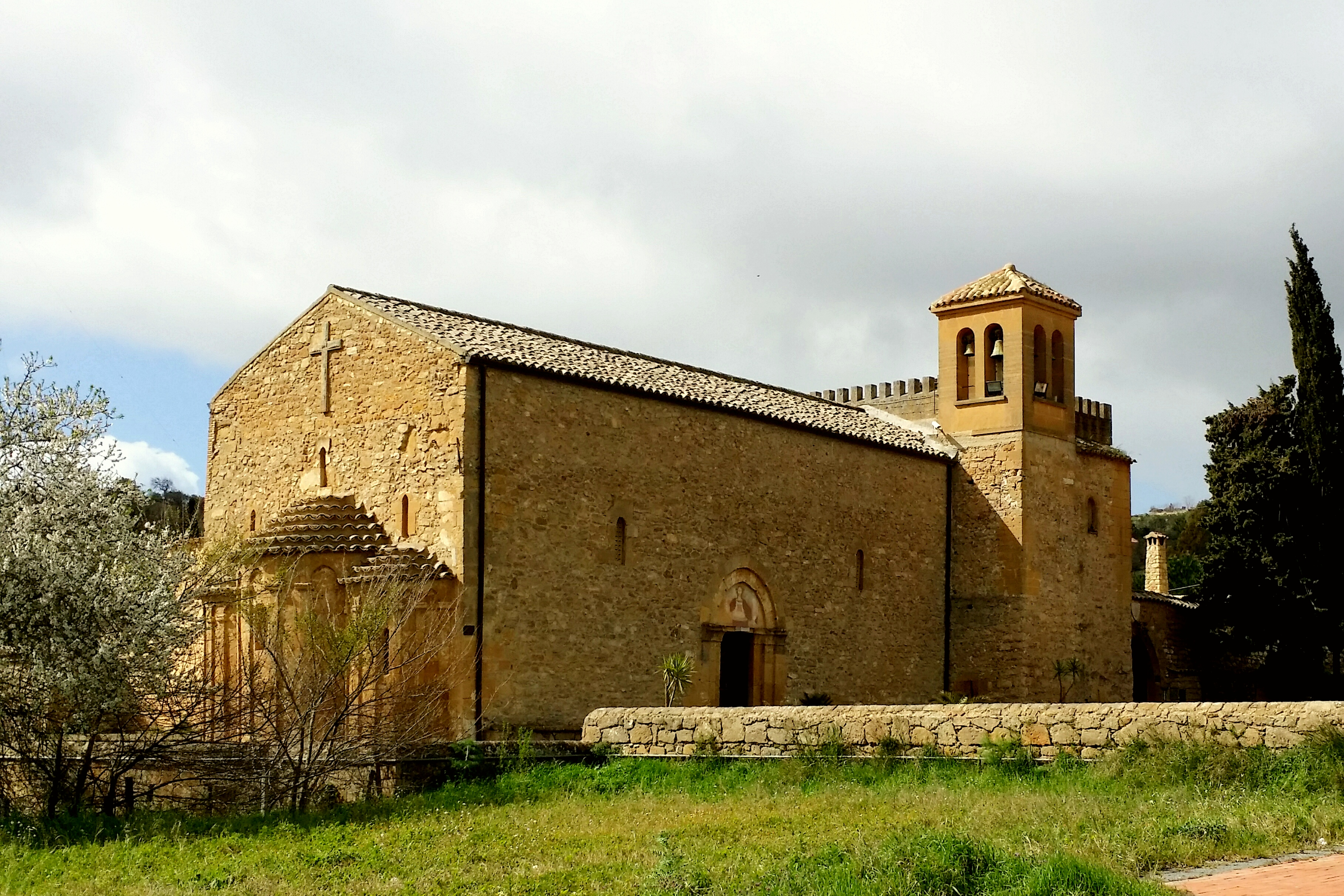
Exterior of church and abbey

The Abbazia di Santo Spirito (Abbey of the Holy Spirit) is a Romanesque and Gothic-style church and monastery located along Strada statale #122 on the northeast outskirts of Caltanissetta, Sicily.

== History ==
The abbey and church were commissioned by the recent conqueror of the island, the Norman Count Ruggero and his wife Queen Adelasia in 1092–1098. Records recall the church was consecrated in 1153. It has undergone much refurbishment over the centuries. The original Romanesque outlines are still identifiable in the characteristic tall semicircular convex apses at the east of the church. The nave is illuminated through narrow windows. These are decorated by flat pilasters forming small arches. The entrance to the church is through the north side through a rounded portal. An entrance to the monastery consists of a 13th-century Gothic ogival portal that leads to a tower that once aided in the castle-like defense of the structure. The church and monastery building rise atop a flat plinth with a retaining wall.

The complex houses a 15th-century frescoed lunette depicting a figure of Christ Blessing. The ancient baptismal font has a stylized Norman motifs.
