= Capodarso bridge =

16th-century arch bridge in Sicily

Coordinates: 37°29′43″N 14°08′44″E

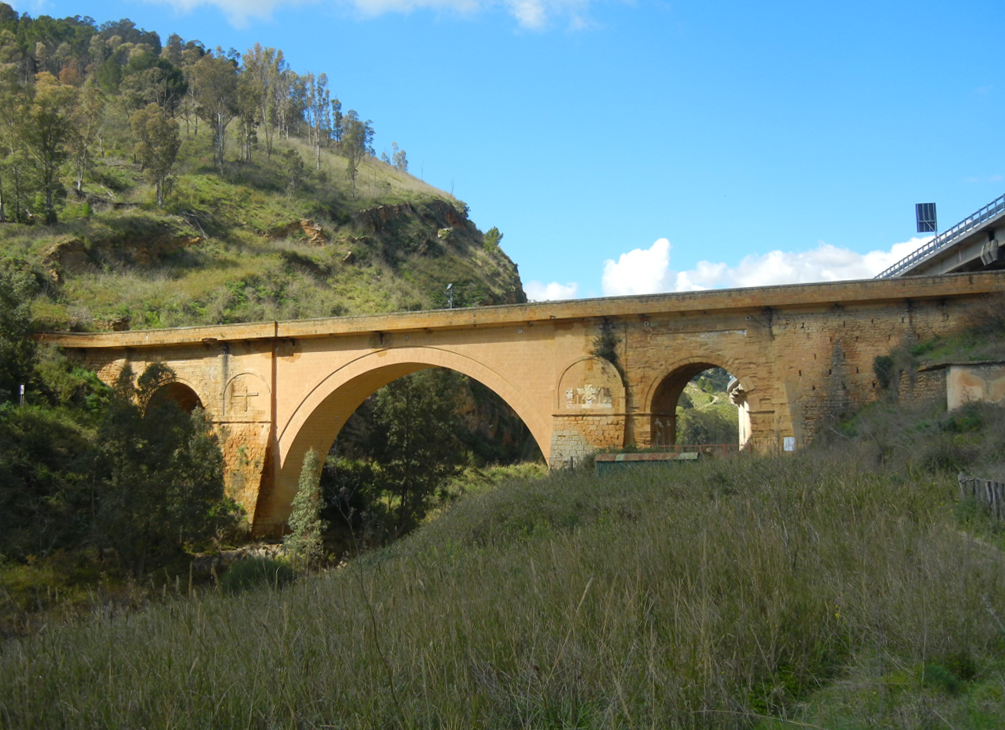
Capodarso bridge in 2015

The Capodarso bridge is a 16th-century arch bridge that crosses the southern Salco on the border between the current municipalities of Caltanissetta and Enna. It takes its name from the nearby Capodarso mountain.

== History ==
The bridge was built in 1553 over the southern Salso by the order of Charles V to avoid fording the river, which is particularly dangerous during floods. It originally had the appearance of a single-arch "humpback" bridge, which could only be crossed by pedestrians; on the sides there were statues representing the twelve apostles. In the eighteenth century the geographer Antonio Chiusole numbered it, together with Etna and the Aretusa spring in Syracuse, among the wonders of Sicily ("a mountain, a source and a bridge"); around the end of the century the French painter Jean Houel made a watercolor drawing of it, during one of his trips to Sicily.

Although it was located exactly on the border with Castrogiovanni, the bridge remained the property of Caltanissetta, as attested by a document dated 1620 in which the maintenance of the entire work was attributed to the municipality of Caltanissetta.

In 1842, it underwent a restoration commissioned by the provincial council, but only after the unification of Italy, in 1863 (or already in the two-year period 1847–48, according to another source) the original form was totally distorted: two small side arches were built alongside the main arch which made it flat, and it was enlarged to make it suitable for the passage of carts. At the end of the works, in 1866, it was inserted in the itinerary of the Caltanissetta - Piazza Armerina rolling road.

The bridge was destroyed on July 9, 1943, by the retreating Germans, and rebuilt the following year. On April 10, 1961, it collapsed again following an exceptional flood; it was reopened to traffic on January 27, 1962.
