= Adameșteanu =

Adameșteanu is a Romanian surname. Notable people with the surname include:

- Dinu Adameșteanu (1913–2004), Romanian-Italian archaeologist, pioneer and promoter of the use of aerial photography and aerial survey in archaeology
- Gabriela Adameșteanu (born 1942), Romanian novelist, short story writer, essayist, journalist, and translator
