= Tavole Palatine =

Coordinates: 40.4160406°N 16.8169154°E

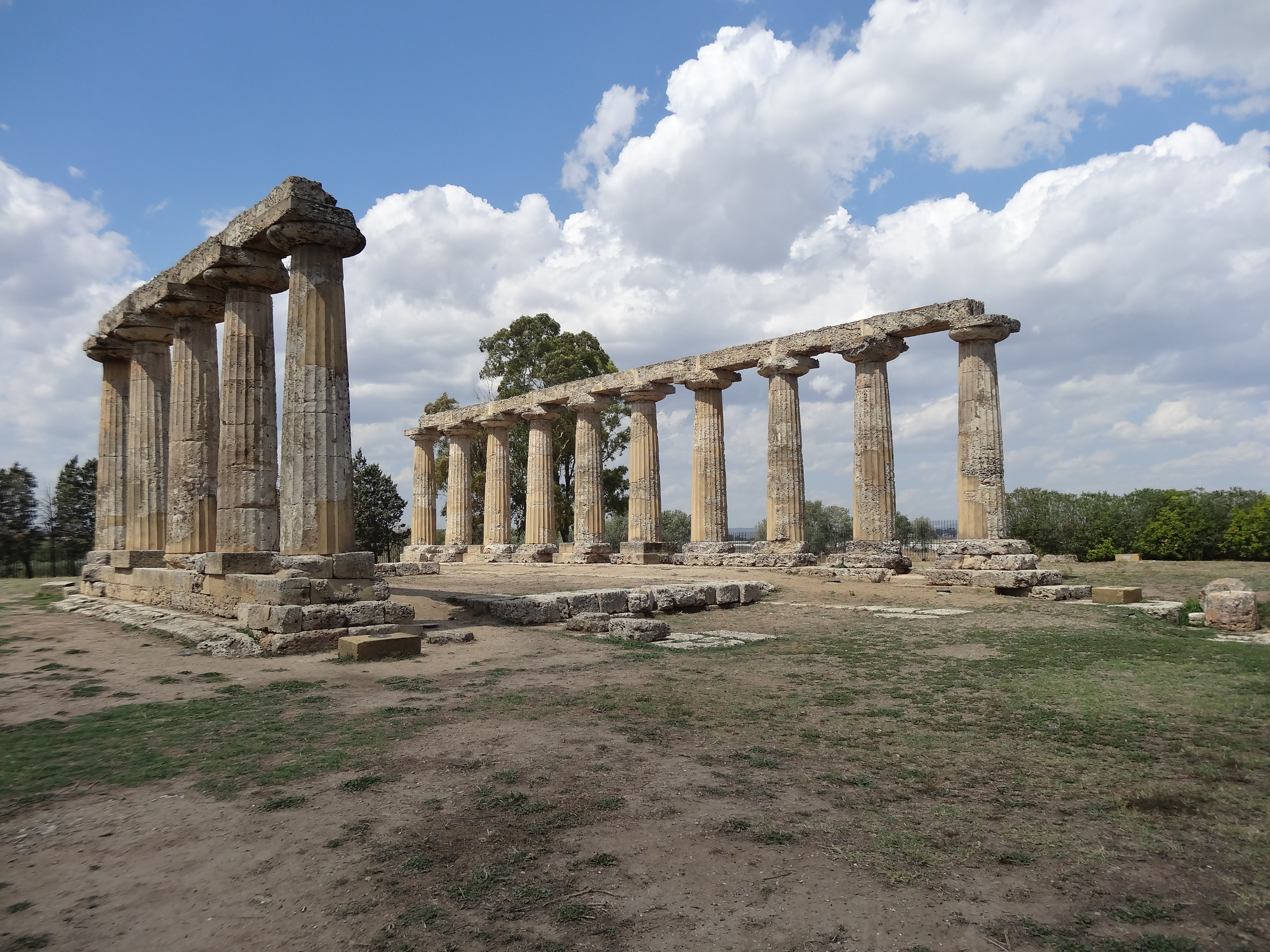
Remains of the Temple of Hera from the sixth century BC

The Tavole Palatine ("Palatine Tables") are the remains of a hexastyle peripteral Greek temple of Magna Graecia the 6th century BC, dedicated to the goddess Hera and the god Apollo. The temple, located near the Bradano river in the south of Italy, was part of a countryside sanctuary and remains of the wall of the temenos and of a very ancient altar are visible.

== History ==
The remains are located in the archaeological area of Metapontum, on the last of the Givoni, ancient sandbanks near the right bank of the river Bradano, built over the remains of a Neolithic village on the prehistoric road from Siris-Heraclea, about three kilometres from the ancient city of Metapontum.

The temple, restored in 1961, was initially attributed to the cult of the goddess Athena, but a fragment of a vase found in the course of the 1926 archaeological excavations turned out to be a votive dedicated to the goddess Hera, showing that she was the patron of the sanctuary.

Until the nineteenth century, the Tavole Palatine were also known locally as the Mensole Palatine (Palatine Shelves) or Colonne Palatine (Palatine Colonnade), probably in reference to the struggles of the French Paladins against the Saracens. The temple was also called the Scuola di Pitagora (School of Pythagoras) in memory of the great philosopher Pythagoras. In the Middle Ages it was also called the Mensae Imperatoris (Tables of the Emperor), probably referring to the Holy Roman Emperor Otto II who camped at Metapontum during his expedition against the Saracens in 982.

== Description ==
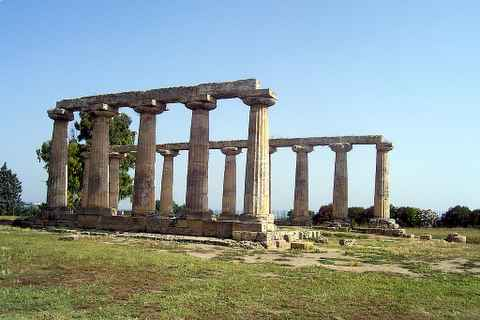
Remains of the central peripteros and of the stylobate

The temple was composed of a central naos, preceded by a pronaos and with an adyton at the rear. Fifteen columns with twenty flutes and Doric capitals survive. Of these fifteen columns, ten are on the north side and five on the southern side. Originally there were thirty-two columns, since the temple had a peristasis of twelve columns on each long side and six on each short side. The stylobate was 34.29 m (112.5 ft) long and 13.66 m (44.8 ft) wide, the naos 17.79 m × 8.68 m (58.4 ft × 28.5 ft). The temple has decayed significantly because it was built with local limestone (so-called mazzarro). In the fifth century BC, the temple had a tiled roof with multi-coloured decoration in the Ionic tradition, with leonine protomes and gargoyles.

Numerous remains of terracotta decoration, statuettes and ceramics, along with smaller column fragments were found near the temple during the 1926 excavations and are now kept at the Museo archeologico nazionale di Metaponto.

== Bibliography ==
- Canino, Antonio (1980). Basilicata, Calabria. Touring Editore. ISBN 9788836500215.
- De Juliis, Ettore M. (2001). Metaponto. Edipuglia. ISBN 9788872283004.
- Lazzarini, Lorenzo (2010). Il tempio di Hera (Tavole Palatine) di Metaponto. F. Serra. ISBN 9788862271769.
