= Policoro =

- Comune
- Comune di Policoro
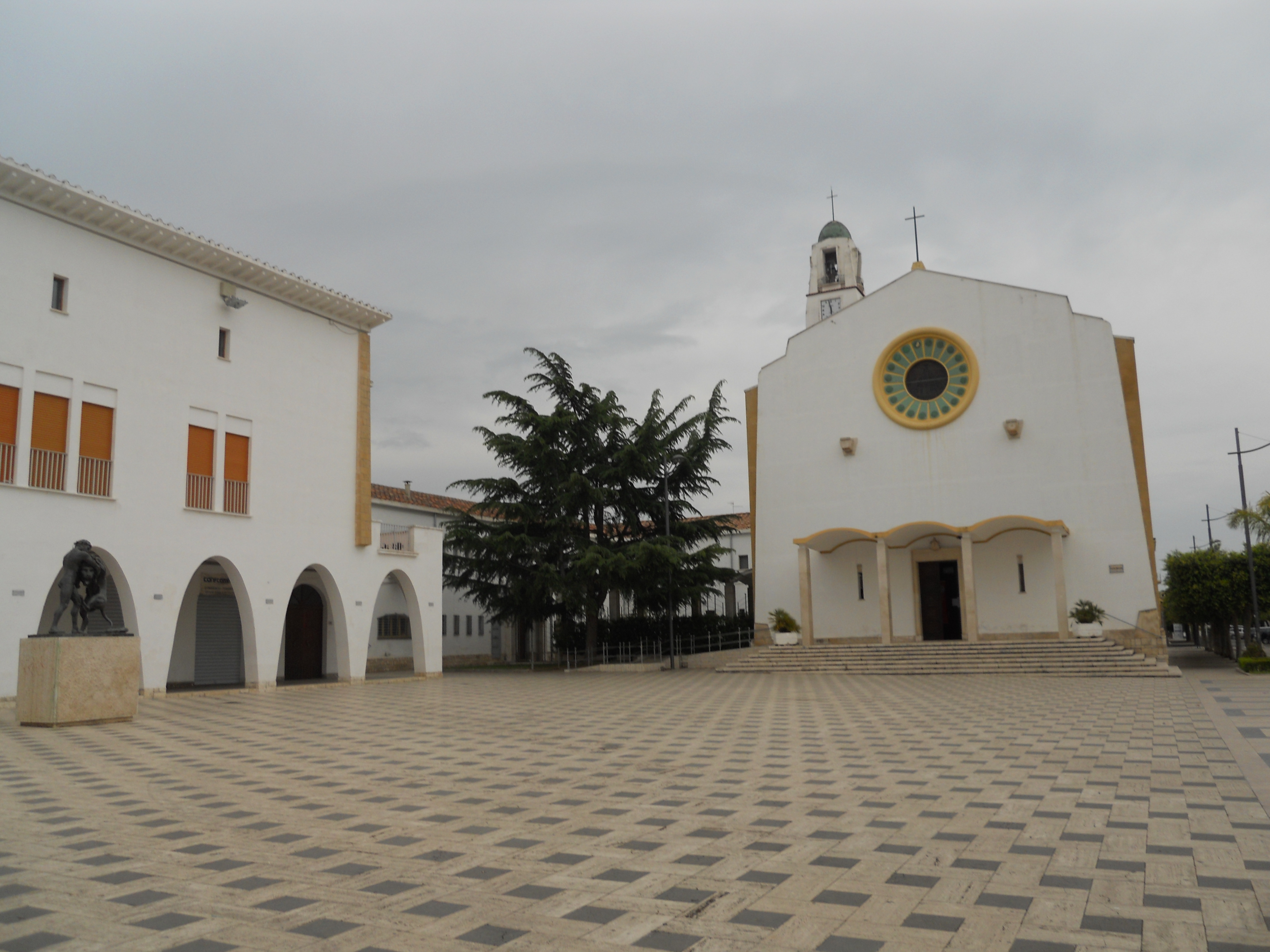
- Eraclea square

- Location within Italy Location within Basilicata
- Coordinates: 40°12′N 16°40′E
- Country: Italy
- Region: Basilicata
- Province: Matera (MT)

Government
  - Mayor: Enrico Bianco

Area
  - Total: 67.66 km^{2} (26.12 sq mi)
- Elevation: 25 m (82 ft)

Population (December 31, 2015)
  - Total: 17,313
  - Density: 255.9/km^{2} (662.7/sq mi)
- Demonym: Policoresi
- Time zone: UTC+1 (CET)
  - Summer (DST): UTC+2 (CEST)
- Postal code: 75025
- Dialing code: 0835
- ISTAT code: 077021
- Patron saint: Madonna of the Bridge
- Website: Official website

Policoro (Lucano: Pulecòre) is a town and comune in the province of Matera, in the Southern Italian region of Basilicata. With some 18,000 inhabitants, is bounded by the towns of Rotondella, Scanzano Jonico and Tursi. Situated on the coast, its population swells in the summertime due to an influx of tourists who come to enjoy the Lido di Policoro.

== History ==
The ruins of the ancient Heraclea (also Heracleia or Herakleia) are located in the modern comune of Policoro.

The city of Heraclea was founded in 434 BC by colonists coming from Taras (present-day Taranto) and Thurii. In very little time, it became richer and more famous than the nearby town Siris. In 280 BCE, the Battle of Heraclea happened there during the war between Taranto and Rome.

The Tables of Heraclea date back to this period and they are now located in the Archeology Museum of Naples. These ancient bronze tablets contain texts in Greek and Latin that discuss public and constitutional rules and laws of the town, one such being "Lex Iulia Municipalis".

During the period of the Roman Empire, the entire area depopulated and Heraclea lost its prestige, becoming a little village on a small hill. The time and circumstances of Heraclea's final extinction are wholly unknown, but the site is now desolate, and the whole neighbouring district, once celebrated as one of the most fertile in Italy, was still almost wholly uninhabited in the mid-19th century.

Today's comune of Policoro arose in the Middle Ages (11th-12th centuries) as a feudal estate and became a village. It developed around the baronial castle, used as a residence from 1000 AD for hunting because of the vast forests owned by local noble families, such as the Berlingieri. The population was sheltered from nearby villages, which were threatened by numerous invasions and raids.

Only after 1950, thanks to the work to reclaim the land which had become marshy and unhealthy over the centuries and also to the agrarian reform that split and redistributed the land to guarantee a fast development and resettlement, Policoro received municipal autonomy. This change attracted families to move to Policoro from all parts of the region, leading to a large demographic surge.

== Geography and weather ==
It is on the Ionian coast, 70 km far from Taranto and 60 km far from Matera. Policoro has a hot Mediterranean climate and enjoys mild winters with moderate rainfall. Summers are warm to hot and also dry and sunny. Rainfall is rare in this season, and a typical July has only two or three days with measurable rainfall. The temperature is typically above 20 °C and frequently reaches 30 °C+. The average maximum temperature in the warmest months (July and August) is around 37 °C. During winter, days can be either sunny and dry or damp and rainy. Frost is unusual and snowfall is extremely rare that they are remembered by the townspeople as special events. The last noticeable snowfall occurred in early January 2017. The average minimum temperature in January is around 7 °C. Spring starts mild and rainy in late March and becomes increasingly warmer and sunnier towards June.

== Culture ==
Events in the town include

- Blues in Town: organized annually by the cultural association La Mela di Odessa, the summer festival, which was founded in 2004, has had performances by artists such as Neffa, Giuliano Palma, Rocco Papaleo, James Senese, Paolo Belli, and Inibizioni Recidive.
- Policoro in Swing: organized annually by the cultural association Vintage Routes, the festival has been held every year at the end of August since 2013. It's an original swing dance camp where music, dancing, sailing, and vacationing combine into a week of fun.
- Balloon—Children's Cartoon and Literature Festival, a summer cultural event that was born in 2012 and has hosted esteemed Italian cartoonists such as Silver (Lupo Alberto), Corrado Mastantuono (Dylan Dog, Tex, and various Disney characters), Giuseppe Palumbo, and Clod.
- Youth Creativity Festival. Organized annually by the Young Democrats of Policoro, the festival was created in 2009 to showcase young artists.

== Sport ==
Policoro had a football team, Policoro 2000 Calcio, until the 2009 Championships. During the 2009–2010 season, Policoro had two teams, A.S.D. Policoro 2000 and A.S.D. Borussia Pleiade. Since the 2010–2011 season, the two football teams combined into one team, A.S.D Policoro Heraclea. The colors of the team were light blue, white, and red, but then they returned to the original colors of white and light blue.

In 2016, Policoro created its first boys’ basketball team, A.S.D. Policoro Basket, for local teenagers. Their home games are played at Palaercole.

== TV and cinema ==
On April 19, 2017, Policoro was mentioned in a “Too Much Exposition Theatre” sketch starring Alec Baldwin on The Late Show with Stephen Colbert as a possible location for a shipwrecked Italian cousin.

The following films were filmed in and around Policoro:

- Berlin Chamissoplatz, directed by Rudolf Thome (1980)
- Libera nos a malo, directed by Fulvio Wetzl (2008)
- Basilicata Coast to Coast, directed by Rocco Papaleo (2010)
- Operazione vacanze, directed by Claudio Fragasso (2012)

== People ==
- Dinu Adameșteanu - archaeologist
- Domenico Ridola - physician, politician and archaeologist
- Domenico Pozzovivo – cyclist
- Gianluca Vizziello – motorcycle racer
- Simone Zaza – footballer
