= Michel Maittaire =

French classical scholar (1668–1747)

Michel Maittaire (also Michael; 1668 – 7 September 1747) was a French-born classical scholar and bibliographer in England, and a tutor to Lord Philip Stanhope. He edited an edition of Quintus Curtius Rufus, later owned by Thomas Jefferson. His works included a grammar of English (1712).

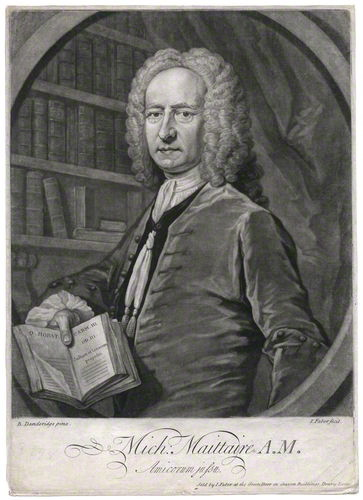
Michel Maittaire, mezzotint by John Faber the Younger after Bartholomew Dandridge.

== Life ==
He was born in France of Huguenot parents, who around the time of the Revocation of the Edict of Nantes moved to England. He obtained a king's scholarship at Westminster School in 1682. Richard Busby, then head-master, made him concentrate on the study of Greek and Latin. On leaving school he went to The Hague, where he was received by the Vaillants, and then to Paris. On returning to England he gained the goodwill of Robert South, at the time a canon of Christ Church, Oxford; it is said that he compiled a list of the Greek words that were wrongly accented in the works of William Sherlock. South made him 'canoneer' student of Christ Church, and he took the degree of M.A. on 23 March 1696, being incorporated M.A. at Cambridge in 1708. In 1695 he was appointed second master of Westminster, but resigned in 1699 and kept a private school, one of the pupils at which was Stephen Martin Leake. Late in life he was Latin tutor to Stanhope, Lord Chesterfield's son. In 1728 he was living in a house in Orange Street, near Holborn, London.

Maittaire died on 7 September 1747, aged 79. Over fifty years he had formed a large library, rich in early printed editions. It was sold by auction in London by Cock & Langford, the sale beginning on 21 November 1748 and lasting for forty-four evenings.

== Works ==
Maittaire began to publish about 1706. His major works are his Annales Typographici and other writings on the history of printing, and of editions of the classics, especially the series of Latin classics printed in duodecimo by Jacob Tonson and Watts of London from 1713 to 1719. Pope had made Maittaire in the manuscript of the Dunciad an inhabitant of the "Kingdom of Dullness", but the lines were not printed, after a request made for their suppression by Edward Harley, 2nd Earl of Oxford, a patron of Maittaire. Extracts from Maittaire's letters to the Earl of Oxford are printed in John Nichols's Literary Anecdotes, and other letters by him are in George Ballard's collection in the Bodleian Library. In his earliest letters he signs his name "Michell Mattaire".

Maittaire's works include:

- Græcæ Linguæ Dialecti, London, 1706, with a preface by Thomas Knipe; also an edition by Johan Frederik Reitz, Hague, 1738, and an improved edition by Friedrich Wilhelm Sturz, Leipzig, 1807.
- Stephanorum Historia, vitas ipsorum ac libros complectens, London, 1709.
- An Essay against Arianism and some other Heresies (against William Whiston), London, 1711; also three other similar pamphlets, London, 1711.
- The English Grammar, London, 1712. This and his Græcæ Linguæ Dialecti were for the use of Westminster School.
- Opera et Fragmenta Veterum Poetarum Latinorum Profanorum et Ecclesiasticorum, 2 vols. London, 1713, published by subscription and dedicated to Prince Eugene; some copies have the title-page dated 1723.
- Latin Classics, 1713–19, edited by M. M.: in 1713, Paterculus, Justin, Lucretius (dedicated to Richard Mead), Phædrus, Sallust, Terence; in 1715, Catullus, Tibullus and Propertius, C. Nepos, Florus, Horace, Ovid, Virgil; in 1716, Cæsar, Martial, Juvenal (dedicated to Thomas Rawlinson) and Persius, Q. Curtius; in 1719, Lucan. Editions of Sophocles, Homer, Livy, Pliny, and the Musarum Anglicanarum Analecta, were attributed to Maittaire, but were disclaimed by him.
- The New Testament (Greek), ed. by M. M., 1714, 1756.
- Historia Typographorum aliquot Parisiensium, vitas et libros complectens, 2 vols. London, 1717.
- Annales Typographici ab Artis inventæ origine ad annum MD (and continued from 1500 to 1664), 5 vols. 1719–41, (vols. i-iii. Hague, vol. iv. Amsterdam, vol. v. London).
- Batrachomyomachia, ed. by M. M., 1721.
- Miscellanea Græcorum aliquot Scriptorum Carmina cum Versione Latina et Notis, London, 1722.
- Anacreontis Opera, ed. by M. M., 1725; 1740.
- P. Petiti ... in tres priores Aretæi Cappadocis libros Commentarii, ed. by M. M., 1726.
- Marmorum Arundellianorum, Seldenianorum, aliorumque Academiæ Oxoniensi donatorum, cum variis Commentariis et indice, secunda editio, with appendix, London, 1732, 1733.
- Aretæi de causis ... morborum ... cum Maittairii opusculis in eundem, 1735.
- Antiquæ Inscriptiones duæ (on the Tabulae Heracleenses inscriptions found at Heraclea Lucania), London, 1736.
- Carmen Epinicium (on Catharine I of Russia), [1737]
- Plutarch's Αποφθἰγματα, ed. by M. M., 1740.
- Senilia, sive Poetica aliquot... tentamina, London, 1742.
