= Dinu Adameșteanu =

Romanian-Italian archaeologist

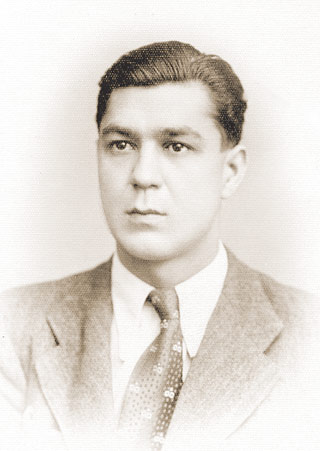
Dinu Adameșteanu in Rome in 1940

Dinu Adameșteanu (Toporu, 25 March 1913 – Policoro, 2 January 2004) was a Romanian-Italian archaeologist, a pioneer and promoter of the use of aerial photography and aerial survey in archaeology. From 1958 to 1964, he was director of Aerofototeca for the Italian Ministry of Public Education, he was a professor of Etruscology, Italian antiquities, and the topography of ancient Italy at the University of Lecce. At the same university, he was also director of the Institute of Archaeology, of the Department of Scholarship on Antiquity, and of the school of classical and medieval archaeology.

As a civil servant, in charge of the Soprintendenze of Basilicata and Apulia, he was notable for his protection of the archaeological sites within the territory under his control, for the creation of a national network of museums, and for advocating the display of archaeological discoveries near the location of their original discovery.

== Biography ==
The fifth of ten sons of a priest of the Romanian Orthodox Church, Adameșteanu received an education similar to that of his siblings: his brother, the veterinarian Ion Adameșteanu was one of the founders of the Romanian veterinary school. His niece, Gabriela Adameșteanu (b. 1942), daughter of Mircea (third of the ten brothers) is a noted Romanian author.

He attended primary school in his native village, followed by the central seminary and Saint Sava National College in Bucharest. From 1933 to 1938, he studied at the University of Bucharest's literature faculty, where one of his professors was Victor Papacostea.

=== Early career in Romania ===
Adameșteanu took part in his first excavations in 1935 on the Black Sea, on the site of Istria, a Greek colony of Miletus, under the direction of Scarlat Lambrino, a noted Romanian epigrapher and historian, university professor and corresponding member of the Romanian Academy, who directed the excavations at Istria from 1928 until 1940 and was director of the National Museum of Antiquities of Bucharest (1938–1940). Because of the absence of archaeological remains on the surface, his work even at this time, took advantage of aerial photography to identify remains, a method which he would later apply in Italy and in campaigns conducted between 1959 and 1960 in Afghanistan, Israel (Caesarea Maritima) and other parts of the Middle East with the Istituto Italiano per il Medio ed Estremo Oriente (Is.M.E.O, now the Is.I.A.O - Istituto Italiano per l'Africa e l'Oriente).

=== Career in Italy ===
Adameșteanu relocated from Romania to Italy in 1939, where he was a member (1940–1942) and then librarian (1943–1946) of the Romanian School in Rome.

In Rome he received a degree along with Gaetano De Sanctis and began a long friendship with the numismatist Attilio Stazio.

The outbreak of the Second World War and the institution of a communist regime in Romania after the war had a dramatic impact on his life. With the loss of his Romanian citizenship, he became a stateless refugee. At this time he first met Mario Napoli (like him a future archaeologist), whom he met at the refugee camp in Bagnoli.

==== Sicily ====
At the end of 1949, in a semi-clandestine fashion on account of his statelessness, Adameșteanu was able to continue his research activities, thanks only to the support and assistance of his friends and colleagues, who asked him to participate in archaeological research in Sicily. Professor Luigi Bernabò Brea, archaeological superintendent for the province of Syracuse, invited him to participate in the exploration of the sites of Syracuse and Leontini. At the latter site, a series of soundages allowed them to identify and then bring to light the city's fortifications, with twenty-metre thick walls on the hill of San Mauro which culminated in the south with the "Syracusan Gate," mentioned by Polybius, which was also excavated at this time.

In Sicily, at the invitation of Piero Griffo, superintendent of Agrigento, Adameșteanu directed the excavation of Butera and Gela, where he collaborated closely with Pietro Orlandini, between 1951 and 1961, advancing research of ancient Sicilian fortifications in particular.

In this period, Adameșteanu adopted a theme which had already been advocated passionately by Vasile Pârvan, who had emphasised the importance of interaction between Greek colonists and indigenous populations in his Getica; this would subsequently become a major focus of historical and archaeological research

For Dinu Adameșteanu, too, it has been the priviliged [sic] focus of research, constantly addressed at all moments in his work, in the Black Sea, in Sicily, in Basilicata. And it was perhaps this range of experience which allowed him to intuit and propose (notably anticipating later studies) the existence of forms of cohabitation between Greek and indigenous groups, distinct from the stereotypical colonial model.

— Liliana Giardino. Omaggio a Dinu Adameșteanu.

He published the results of his research in Sicily, together with Orlandini, in three volumes dedicated to the fortifications of Gela and to the ancient territory of the city, in the Accademia dei Lincei's Notizie degli Scavi, and in other journals, including Revue Archeologique, Archeologia Classica, and Bollettino d'Arte.

==== Aerial survey and Aerofototeca at the Ministry of Public Education ====
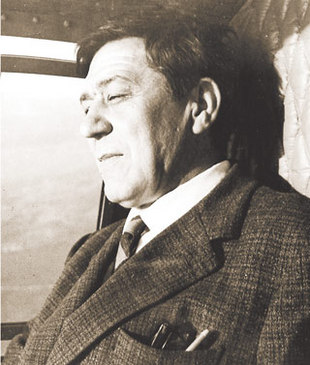
Adameșteanu, pioneer of aerial archaeology, during a helicopter survey in 1966

In this period, Adameșteanu continued his pioneering use of aerial survey. His attentive and patient comparison between surface and aerial photographic evidence allowed him to identify "a large number of ancient sites, some known only through literary sources and some otherwise entirely unknown.

He also deployed these techniques for the study of ancient urban and rural structures of Spina and its hinterland in the Po delta. But even more important was his use of aerial photographic techniques for the protection of archaeological sites: he used it to identify areas where large scale construction projects impacted on sites of archaeological interest. He worked to promote the potential offered by the integration of aerial photography into traditional archaeological research, through demonstrations in Italy and abroad.

Owing to his personal qualities and achievements, he received Italian citizenship for scientific merit in 1954. In 1958 he was entrusted with the creation of Aerofototeca, a subdivision of the National Photographic Office of the Ministry of Public Education, which he directed from 1959 to 1990.

This institute, the only one of its kind in Europe or America, collected aerial photographs, plans and stereocopic photographs of Italian territory taken during the Second World War by the Regia Aeronautica, the United States Army Air Forces, the Royal Air Force and the German Luftwaffe, and used them for the reconstruction of ancient topography. These images were supplemented by the activities of the Istituto Geografico Militare and of the Florentine Ufficio Tecnico Erariale.

==== Soprintendente in Basilicata and Puglia ====
In 1964, Adameșteanu was posted to Potenza in Lucania with his appointment as the head of the newly created archaeological sovrintendenza of Basilicata. He was involved in excavations during this period at Metapontum, Policoro, Matera, Melfi, and Heraclea Lucania, either personally or in a supporting capacity. The results of the work carried out by him along the coast of the Ionian Sea in collaboration with an international team of archaeologists, was published in the work, La Basilicata Antica.

After this, for the few months between the end of 1977 and April 1978, he had a brief stint as archaeological sovrintendente of Apulia, where he worked to protect some Messapian sites.

From 1971 to 1983, Adameșteanu was also a professor of Etruscology, Italian antiquities, and the topography of ancient Italy at the University of Lecce. He was also director of the Institute of Archaeology, of the Department of Scholarship on Antiquity, and of the school of classical and medieval archaeology at the same university.

==== Museum advocacy ====
One of Dinu Adameșteanu's main preoccupations was the creation, maintenance and development of museums located near archaeological sites. This had positive results for a large number of regional museums: at Metaponto, for example, his intervention in the local "Antiquarium" led to its transformation into a national museum, the Museo archeologico nazionale of Metaponto; at Policoro, his advocacy laid the foundations for a new museum, which also achieved national status, the Museo archeologico nazionale della Siritide. At Melfi, the Museo archeologico nazionale del Melfese was established inside the Norman castle.

==== Academic affiliations and honours ====
Dinu Adameșteanu was a member of a large number of academic organisations. He received the Feltrinelli Prize from the Accademia dei Lincei in 1975, the "Basilicata prize" for non-fiction in 1975, the gold medal with diploma of the first class of merit in education, culture and the arts from the Ministry for Cultural Assets and Environments in 1982, the "A Life for Lucania" prize in 1986, the LucaniaGold prize for culture from the commune of Pomarico in 1987, the "Carlo Levi" literary prize in 2000, membership of the French Légion d'honneur, and the Order of the Star of Romania in 2003.

He was a corresponding member of the Pontificia accademia romana di archeologia, the Accademia di Archeologia Italiana and the German Archaeological Institute, as well as an Honorary Fellow of the British School of Rome and the Romanian Academy.

=== Death ===
On 21 January 2004, professor Dinu Adameșteanu died at his home in Policoro. On 20 May 2005, the Museo archeologico nazionale della Basilicata in the Palazzo Loffredo in Potenza, was officially opened and named "Dinu Adameșteanu" in his honour.

== Bibliography ==
- Liliana Giardino, Omaggio a Dinu Adameșteanu, on the website of the Aerofototeca Nazionale-ICCD
- Domenico Musti, "Dinu," in Enciclopedia Italiana - VI Appendice (2000), Istituto dell'Enciclopedia Italiana, (online)
- "Official site of Aerofototeca". Archived from the original on 2010-04-06.
- "History of Aerofototeca".
- Cosimo Damiano Fonseca, Addio ad Adameșteanu. Fece rinascere Heraclea on La Repubblica (22 January 2004), p. 11.

Other sources

- AA.VV., Attività archeologica in Basilicata 1964-1977. Scritti in onore di Dinu Adameșteanu, Matera, 1980
- AA.VV., Studi in onore di Dinu Adameșteanu, Galatina, 1983.
