= National Archaeological Museum of Metaponto =

Museum in Metaponto, Italy

Coordinates: 40°22′25″N 16°48′27″E

Metaponto National Archaeological Museum
- Museo Archeologico Nazionale di Metaponto
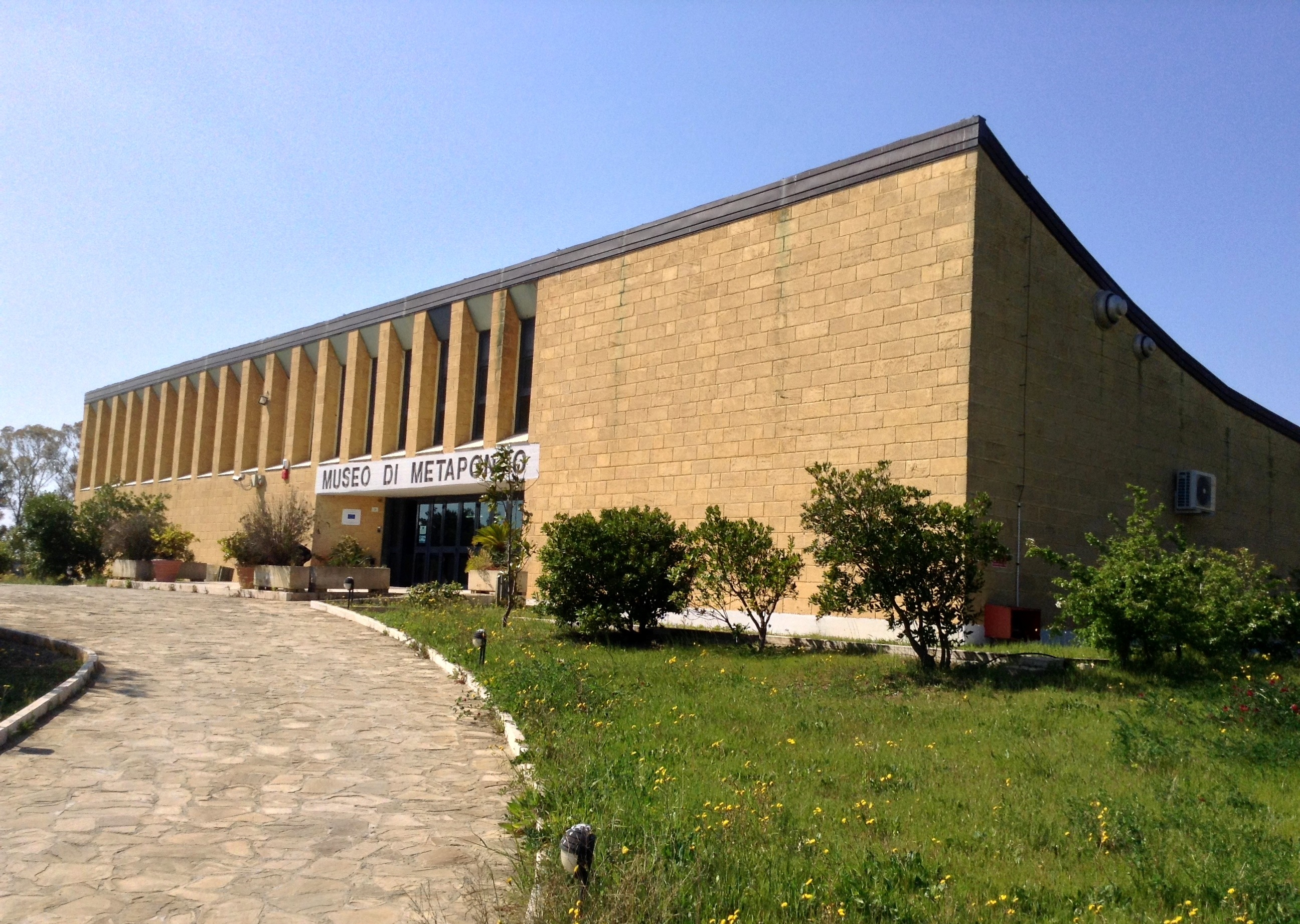
- Façade of the museum
- Established: 1991
- Location: via Dinu Adamesteanu,21 Metaponto Italy
- Type: archaeology
- Collections: Greeks
- Director: Savino Gallo

The National Archaeological Museum of Metaponto (Italian: Museo archeologico nazionale di Metaponto) is a museum housing the archaeological finds from the Greek city of Metapontum, now Metaponto, Basilicata, Italy. It replaces the small Antiquarium built near the Heraion (temple of Hera) outside the walls of the Tavole Palatine.
