= Ekklesiasterion =

Ancient Greek civic assembly venue

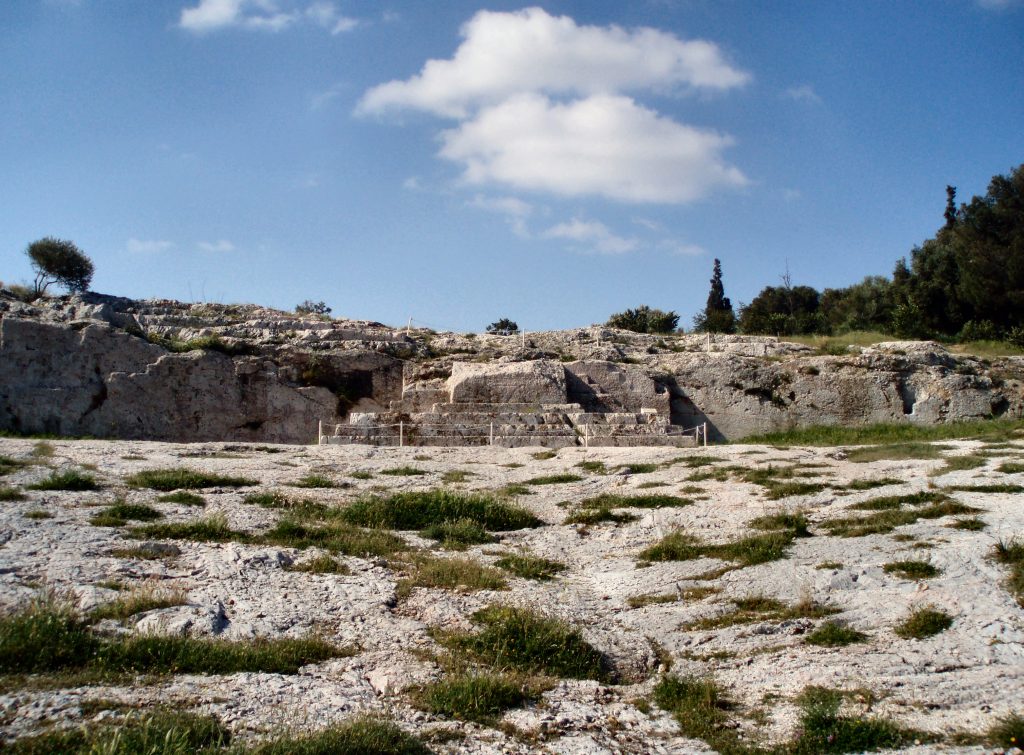
The ekklesia in Athens convened on a hill called the Pnyx

In Ancient Greece, the ekklesiasterion (ἐκκλησιαστήριον) was the meeting place of the popular assembly (ekklesia) in a democratic Greek city-state (polis, plural poleis).

== Venue ==
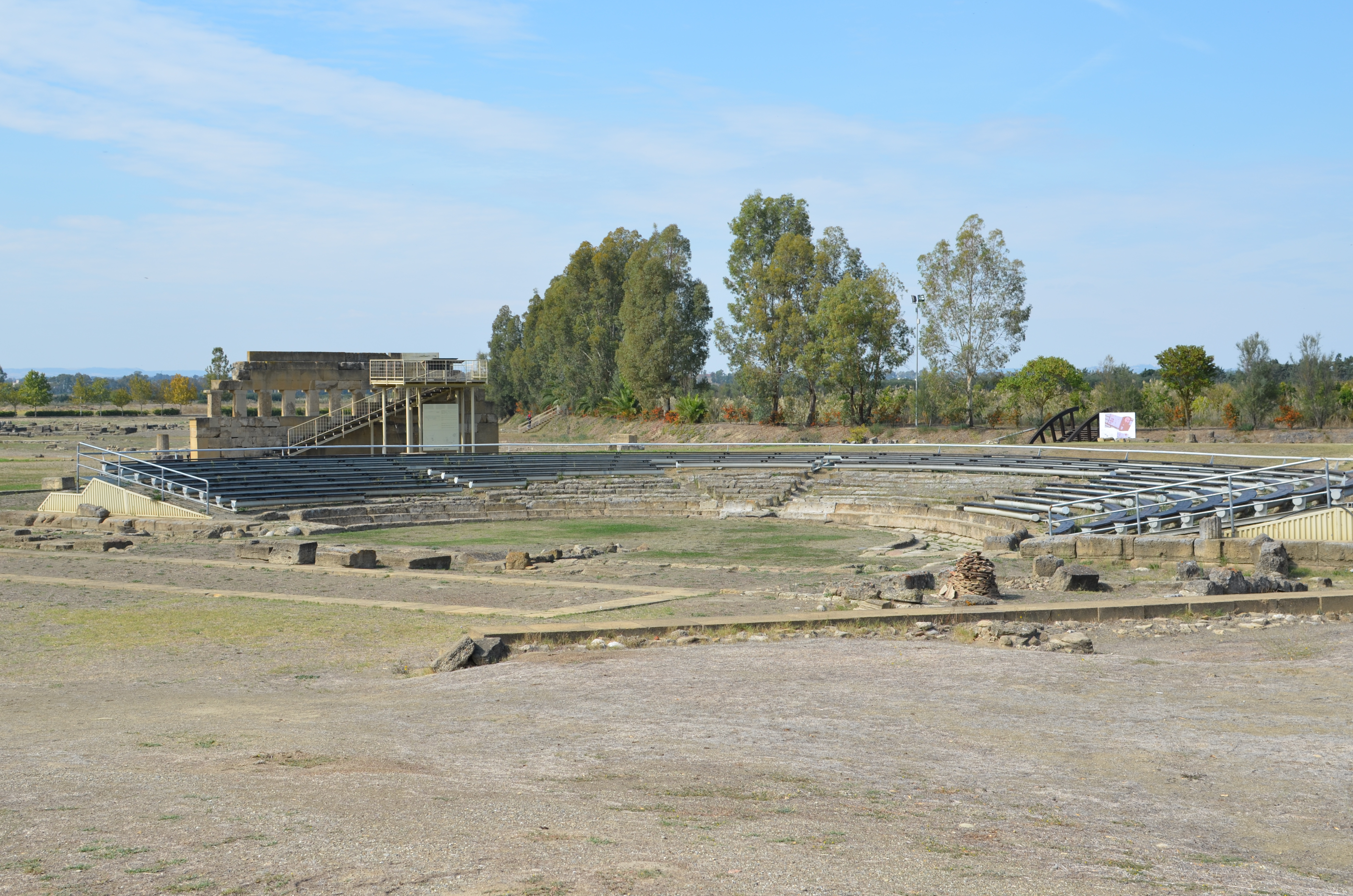
The theater of Metapontum was built over the ekklesiasterion

In a few poleis, the ekklesiasterion was a separate building, but in many cases the theater was used for both performances and the meetings of ekklesia. In some cases, multiple locations were used. In Athens, the regular meetings of the assembly were held on the Pnyx hill and two annual meetings took place in the Theater of Dionysus. Around 300 BC, all the meetings of the ekklesia were moved to the theater. The meetings of the assembly could attract large audiences: 6,000 citizens might have attended in Athens during the fifth century BC. Hansen and Fischer-Hansen argue that theaters were primarily built for performances and that their use by the ekklesia was a convenient extra function.

In poleis which had a separate ekklesiasterion, the building could take a variety of forms. Many consisted of steps built in the slope of a hill, similar to theaters but much smaller. Delos had a roofed building. In Metapontum, it was a circular structure on flat terrain with elevated steps. A walkway intersected through the center, where a podium was placed. It could accommodate 7,500 to 8,000 people in the beginning of the fifth century BC, after it was expanded. Such a circular structure was unusual for its location in Magna Graecia. A circular unroofed building with tiers of seating in Paestum, ancient Poseidonia, has also been identified as an ekklesiasterion. This is more likely a bouleuterion however, because it could only seat 500 to 600 people in a relatively large city.

== Sources ==
- Hansen, Mogens Herman; Fischer-Hansen, Tobias (1994). "Political Architecture in Archaic and Classical Greek Poleis". In Whitehead, David (ed.). From Political Architecture to Stephanus Byzantius: Sources for the Ancient Greek Polis. Historia: Einzelschriften. Vol. 87. Stuttgart: Franz Steiner Verlag. pp. 23–90. ISBN 978-3-515-06572-6.
- Horky, Philip Sidney (2007). Plato's Magnesia and Philosophical Polities in Magna Graecia. ISBN 978-0-549-23690-0.
