= Alessio Simmaco Mazzocchi =

Italian Catholic priest and philologist

Reverend Alessio Simmaco Mazzocchi
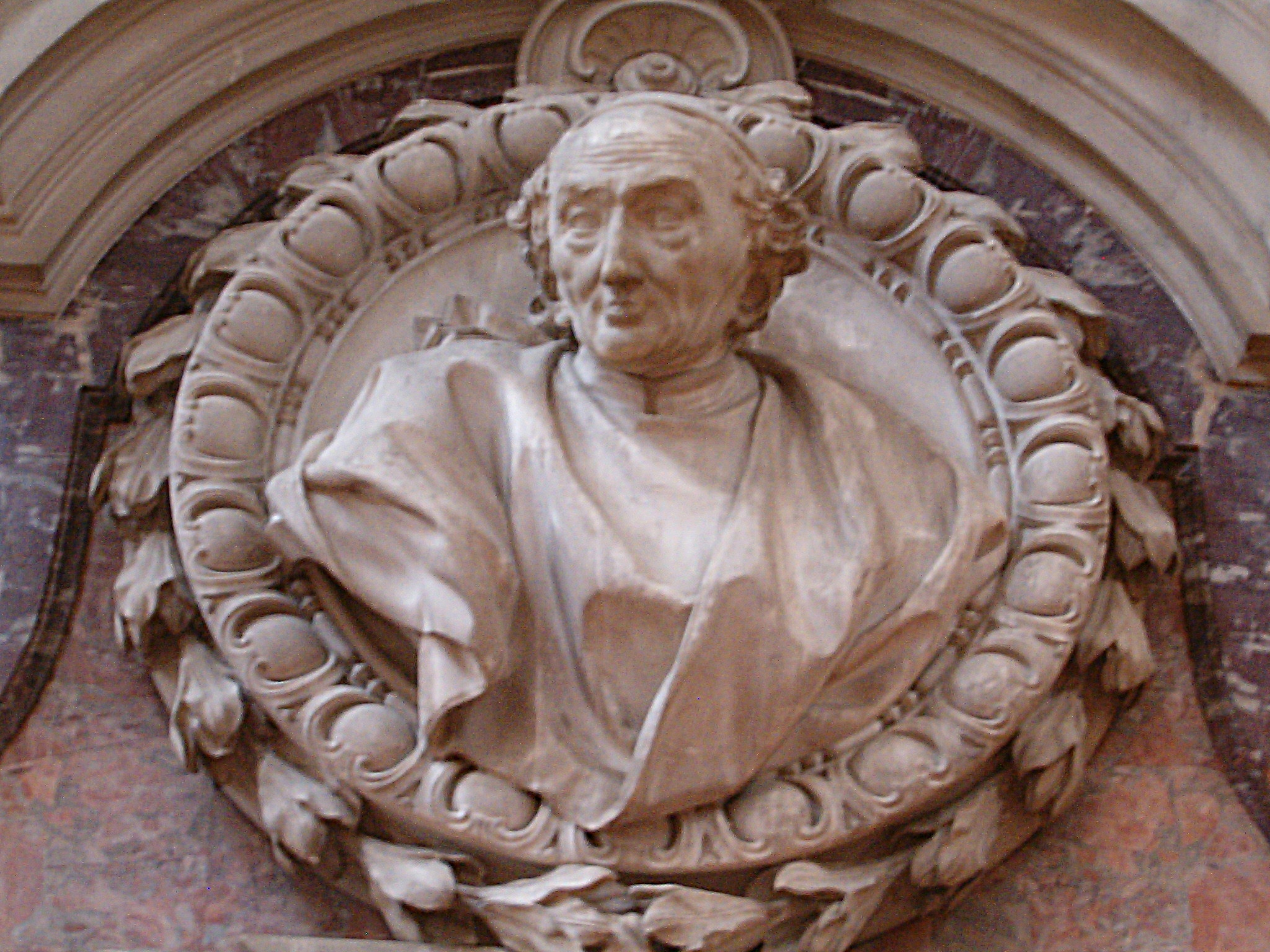
- Bust of Alessio Simmaco Mazzocchi by Giuseppe Sanmartino
- Born: October 21, 1684; Santa Maria Capua Vetere, Kingdom of Naples
- Died: 12 September 1771 (aged 86); Naples, Kingdom of Naples
- Resting place: Santa Restituta
- Occupations: Catholic priest, translator, university teacher, orientalist
- Parent(s): Lorenzo Mazzocchi and Margherita Mazzocchi (née Battaglia)

Academic work
- Discipline: Classical archaeology, Classics, Biblical studies
- Institutions: University of Naples Federico II

Alessio Simmaco Mazzocchi (21 October 1684 – 12 September 1771) was an Italian priest, antiquary and philologist. He is credited as the "founder of the modern study of Magna Graecia" for his pioneering work on the history, epigraphy, and ancient sites of southern Italy.

== Biography ==
Alessio Simmaco Mazzocchi was born in 1684 at Santa Maria Capua Vetere, near Capua. He attended the Seminaries of Capua and Naples. He was ordained a priest in 1709, and became professor of Greek and Hebrew at the archiepiscopal seminary at Naples. In 1711 he was made a canon of the Cathedral of Capua and in 1735 he was appointed professor of theology and Sacred Scripture at the University of Naples.

His archaeological work earned him a European reputation. His commented edition of the Heraclean Tablets (1754–1755) played a significant role in the 18th-century rediscovery of Magna Graecia, and was celebrated by Winckelmann for the breadth of its scope and its scholarly quality. In contrast to Winckelmann, however, Mazzocchi believed that the civilization of Magna Graecia had Phoenician or Oriental roots and that Greek colonists merely had joined existing cultures in Italy, founded by peoples from farther east.

As a prominent philologist and epigraphist, Mazzocchi contributed his scholarship to the interpretation and commentary of the highly influential Le Antichità di Ercolano Esposte (1757–62), providing linguistic, historical and epigraphic analyses of the ancient artefacts recently discovered in Herculaneum, Pompeii and Stabiae. Mazzocchi made also significant contributions to the field of biblical criticism (Spicilegium Biblicum, 3 vols., 1763–78).

Mazzocchi died in Naples on 12 September 1771 and was buried in the Basilica of Santa Restituta in Naples. His funerary monument was sculpted by Giuseppe Sanmartino. Mazzocchi was a friend of Francesco Scipione Maffei, Jacopo Facciolati and Ludovico Antonio Muratori. He was a member of several learned societies, including the Accademia Ercolanese and the Académie des Inscriptions et Belles-Lettres.

== Works ==
Commentariorum in Regii Herculanensis Musei aeneas tabulas Heracleenses, Naples: Benedetto Gessari. 1754

- In mutilum Campani Amphitheatri titulum, aliasque nonnullas Campanas Inscriptiones Commentarius. Naples: Vincenzo Orsini. 1727. Reissued in the fifth volume of Giovanni Poleni's Utriusque Thesauri Antiquitatum Nova Supplementa;
- De dedicatione sub ascia commentationes. Naples: Felice Carlo Mosca. 1739.
- De antiquis Corcyræ nominibus schediasma. Naples: Novello de Bonis. 1742.
- In vetus marmoreum Sanctae Neapolitanae Ecclesiae Kalendarium Commentarius. Naples: Novello de Bonis. 1744–55.
- Commentariorum in Regii Herculanensis Musei aeneas tabulas Heracleenses. Naples: Benedetto Gessari. 1754–1755.
- Spicilegium Biblicum. Naples: Ex Regia Typographia. 1763–78.

Mazzocchi published several other philological and archeological dissertations, among whom one in Italian, on the origin of the Tyrrhenians, published in the third volume of the Acts of the Etruscan Academy of Cortona. He published also an improved edition of Vossius' Etymologicon linguae Latinae (Naples, 1762) and dissertations on Hebrew poetry and on the Antiquities of the Roman Campagna. He left besides, in manuscript, a book on the origin of the city of Capua.

== Bibliography ==
- This article incorporates public domain material from McClintock, John; Strong, James (1867–1887). Cyclopædia of Biblical, Theological and Ecclesiastical Literature. Harper and Brothers.
- Rose, Hugh James (1848). "(Mazzocchi) Alessio Simmacho". A New General Biographical Dictionary. Vol. 10. London: B. Fellowes. p. 68.
- Luise, Flavia (2009). "MAZZOCCHI, Alessio Simmaco". Dizionario Biografico degli Italiani (in Italian). Vol. 72: Massimo–Mechetti. Rome: Institute of the Italian Encyclopaedia. ISBN 978-88-12-00032-6.
- Ceserani, Giovanna (2012). Italy's Lost Greece: Magna Graecia and the Making of Modern Archaeology. Oxford: Oxford University Press. ISBN 978-0-19-987679-2.
