= Heraclean Tablets =

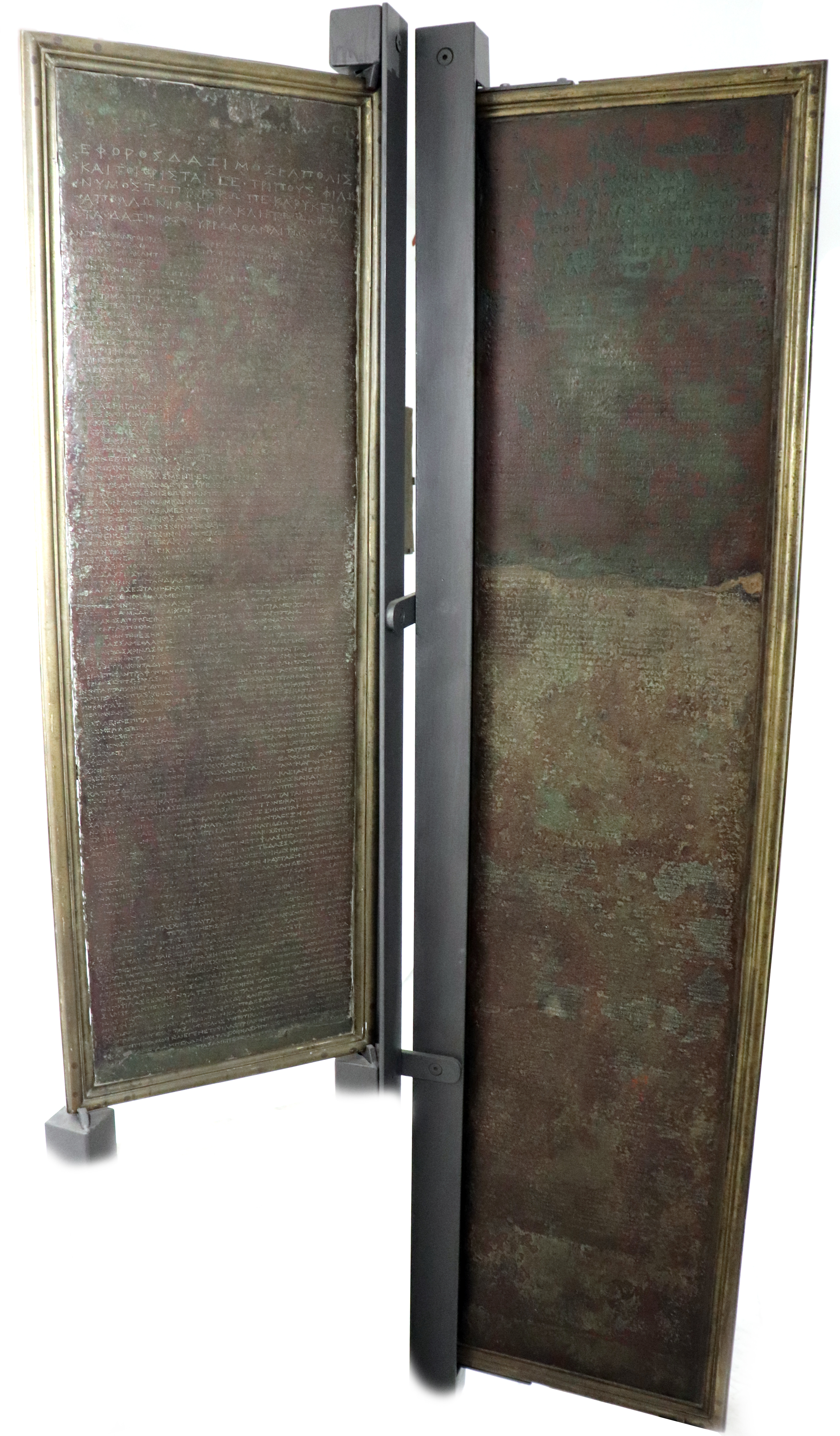

The Heraclean Tablets (in older texts, the Heraclean Table(s); Lat.Tabulae Heracleenses) are bronze tablets inscribed with various ancient legal texts, which were found a short distance from the site of Heraclea Lucania in the direction of Metapontum, sites in present day Italy. They are significant for the study of Roman Law.

== Background ==
As a consequence of its having accepted Roman citizenship in 89 BCE, Heraclea became a municipium, and the Tabulae Heracleenses contain a long Latin inscription relating to the municipal regulations of Heraclea, engraved on two tablets of bronze, on the back of which is a long Greek inscription of earlier date, probably the 3rd century BC, defining the boundaries of lands belonging to various temples. This document is a major authority for the municipal law of ancient Italy.

Scholarship traditionally identified the inscription on the tablets with the Lex Iulia Municipalis, a law issued in 45 BCE for the regulation of the municipal institutions of towns throughout Italy. It is now widely believed that the tablets do not record a single law, but include material from multiple pieces of legislation. The ultimate origin of the municipal regulations on the tablet is debated: they may have been identical with part of the Lex Iulia Municipalis, although some scholars have argued that the municipal law may go back to the earlier lex Iulia de civitate.

== History of the tablets ==
The tablets were separate, and the major one was in two fragments. They were found in 1732, and 1735, in the bed of the Cavone river.

A fragment was purchased by Francesco Ficoroni and taken to England, where it was sold to Brian Fairfax the younger. On Fairfax's death in 1749, it was bought by Philip Carteret Webb. In the end it was returned to Naples in 1752. The tablets are now in the Naples National Archaeological Museum.

== Scholarship ==
The Latin inscription was first published by Michel Maittaire in 1735. There have been legal commentaries by Heinrich Eduard Dirksen (Berlin, 1817–1820) and Friedrich Carl von Savigny, in his Vermischte Schriften vol. iii. Both inscriptions were published with commentaries, by Alessio Simmaco Mazzocchi (1684–1771) (2 vols. fol. Naples, 1754, 1755). The other inscription is in Doric Greek.
