= Gabriela Adameșteanu =

Romanian writer, journalist and translator (born 1942)

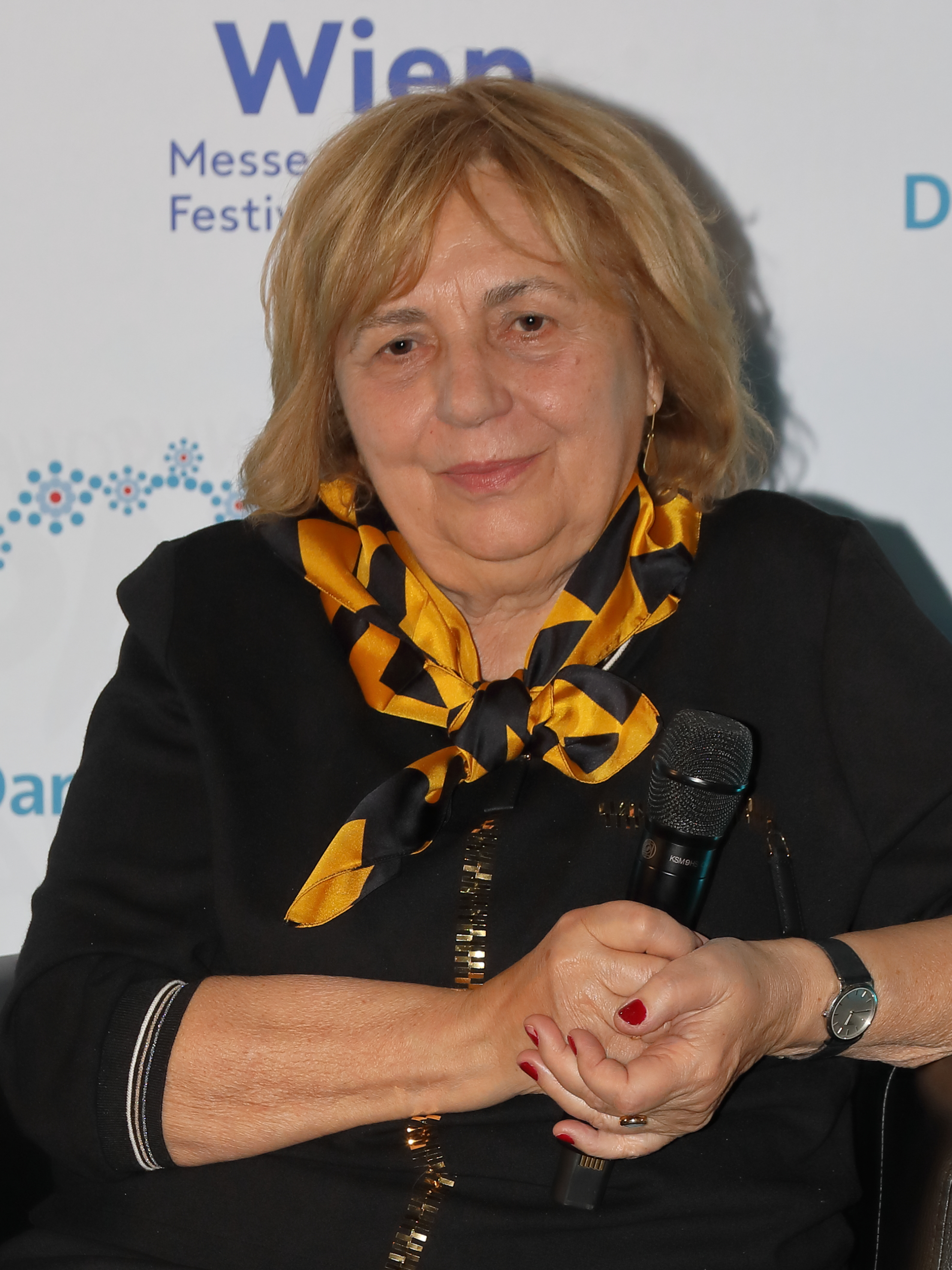
- Adameșteanu in 2024
- Born: April 2, 1942 (age 84); Târgu Ocna, Romania
- Occupations: Novelist; short story writer; essayist; journalist
- Writing career
- Period: 1975–
- Genre: Realism

Gabriela Adameșteanu (Romanian pronunciation: [ɡabriˈela adameʃˈte̯anu]; born April 2, 1942) is a Romanian novelist, short story writer, essayist, journalist, and translator. The author of the celebrated novels The Equal Way of Every Day (1975) and Wasted Morning (1983), she is also known as an activist in support of civil society and member of the Group for Social Dialogue (GDS), as well as editor of Revista 22.

== Biography ==
Gabriela Adameșteanu was born in Târgu Ocna on 2 April 1942. She was the daughter of Mircea Adameșteanu, a high school history teacher, and Elena, a home economics teacher who lost her position when her subject matter was removed from the curriculum by Communist authorities and she had to work in a kindergarten. A brother of Mircea Adameșteanu's became a political prisoner of the Communist regime; another, the renowned archaeologist Dinu Adameșteanu, had taken refuge in Italy.

Gabriela Adameșteanu lived much of her youth in Pitești. In 1960–1965, she attended the University of Bucharest's Faculty of Literature, graduating with a thesis on Marcel Proust, and made her debut with a short prose piece in 1971. Adameșteanu was employed by the Editura Politică department that was to become, in 1966, the Editura Științifică și Enciclopedică publishing house, and began contributing to major literary magazines (Viața Românească and România Literară). After 1983, she worked as an editor for Cartea Românească, where she made efforts to preserve literary standards in front of a new wave of censorship under the Nicolae Ceaușescu regime.

She married Gheorghe-Mihai Ionescu and gave birth to a son, Mircea Vlad Ionescu, in 1968.

Drumul egal al fiecărei zile (The Equal Way of Every Day), a story alluding to intellectual survival in a provincial environment during the aggressive Stalinist 1950s, won her critical acclaim and the Romanian Academy prize. In 1979, she published a series of short stories under the title Dăruiește-ți o zi de vacanță ("Offer Yourself a Day Off"), which expanded on the themes of The Equal Way. During the same year, in August, she traveled to the People's Republic of Poland, where she witnessed the mood encouraged by the visit of Pope John Paul II (according to her recollections, it was "a magic sentiment of human dignity").

With Dimineață pierdută (Wasted Morning), a complex novel centered on an apparently banal conversation between two women, discreetly but fastidiously reconstructing the tragic end of the interwar generation, Adameșteanu was awarded the Writers' Union prize and was confirmed as one of the most important Romanian authors of the 1980s. Wasted Morning was set to stage by Cătălina Buzoianu in 1987, becoming the center of interest at a time when the Ceaușescu regime had entered its more repressive phase.

After the Romanian Revolution of 1989, she resigned from her position at Cartea Românească. In 1990, she joined GDS, and became editor of its magazine, 22, the following year. For many years Adameșteanu has been and still is a member of the Romanian PEN center, for some years as well served as president of it.

Her other literary works include Vară-primăvară (a collection of short stories published in 1989), Obsesia politicii (interviews with post-1989 political figures, 1995), Cele două Românii (essays, 2000), and the 2003 novel Întâlnirea. She has translated into Romanian Guy de Maupassant's Pierre et Jean and Hector Bianciotti's Sans la miséricorde du Christ.

== Work ==
Adameșteanu's work, which has been described as realist and, alternatively, as "hyperrealist", is noted for its portrayals of humanity decaying under the leveling pressure of mundane reality. In this respect, critics have rated her literature among the major accomplishments of her generation (alongside the similarly themed novels and short stories of Norman Manea, Bedros Horasangian, Alexandru Papilian, and Mircea Nedelciu).

Her powerful depictions of values becoming debased (under the pressure of totalitarianism) relies on the use of competing narratives and voices (aspects of which include those of young civil servants who find themselves overwhelmed by mediocrity, daughters pressured by social priorities into not mourning their parents, and unhappily married women). Adameșteanu's accuracy in expressing various patterns of speech and behavior has itself drawn acclaim.

In 2000, she was awarded the Order of the Star of Romania, Officer rank.
