= Domenico Ridola =

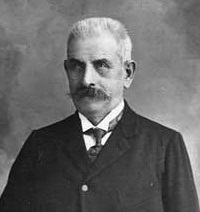
- Born: 19 October 1841; Ferrandina
- Died: 11 June 1932 (aged 90); Matera

Domenico Ridola (19 October 1841, in Ferrandina – 11 June 1932, in Matera) was an Italian physician, politician and archaeologist.

== Early life ==
Ridola was born to Gregorio Ridola and noblewoman Camilla de Gemmis of Terlizzi. In 1865, he graduated in Medicine from the University of Naples Federico II, and then continued his studies in Italy and abroad.

== Career ==
He opened a private practice in his home-town, Matera. In 1872 he discovered a new pediatric disease, called "sindrome del Ridola", a particular sublingual neoformation.

Ridola was mayor of Matera and a provincial councillor for many years. He was nominated for the Council of Matera after the premature death of Michele Torraca in 1906. He was re-elected in 1909, defeating Nicola De Ruggieri. In 1913, at age 72, he was elected Senator at the Parliament of Regno d'Italia.

Ridola was a keen archaeologist, making many excavations around Matera and Murge. His discoveries included material dating to the Paleolithic era, in particular in the Grotta dei pipistrelli. He unearthed villages of the Neolithic era, an ancient necropolis and a prosperous stips votiva in Timmari, the neolithic site of Serra d'Alto and some tombs belonging to the Age of metals. In 1911, Ridola donated his discoveries to the State, now conserved in a museum dedicated to his memory, the Museo archeologico nazionale Domenico Ridola.

Ridola was a member of the Istituto Archeologico Germanico, of the Accademia Francese di Archeologia, of the Accademia Pontaniana and of the Società Magna Grecia. He was nominated as the inspector of ancient monuments in Matera.

Ridola died in 1932 in Matera and is buried in the Cimitero vecchio with his brother Leonardo.

== Publications ==
- Un'efficace metodo di cura in talune forme gravi d'isterismo, 1889
- Caso di sanguisuga in trachea, 1894
- Avanzi di stazione preistorica e necropoli ad incinerazione scoperta a Monte Timmari presso Matera, 1900
- La paletnologia nel Materano, 1901
- Quagliati Quintino - Necropoli arcaica ad incinerazione presso Timmari nel materano, 1906
- Le origini di Matera, 1906
- Per la Lucania Antica (Discorso inaugurale della nuova sede del Museo archeologico nazionale della Basilicata), 6 September 1907
- Brevi note sulla stazione preistorica della Grotta dei Pipistrelli e della vicina grotta Funeraria, 1912
- Villaggi trincerati preistorici nel Materano, 1924
- Le grandi trincee preistoriche di Matera : la ceramica e la civiltà di quel tempo, 1926
