= Siris, Magna Graecia =

Ancient Greek city in Southern Italy

Coordinates: 40°9′10″N 16°41′30″E

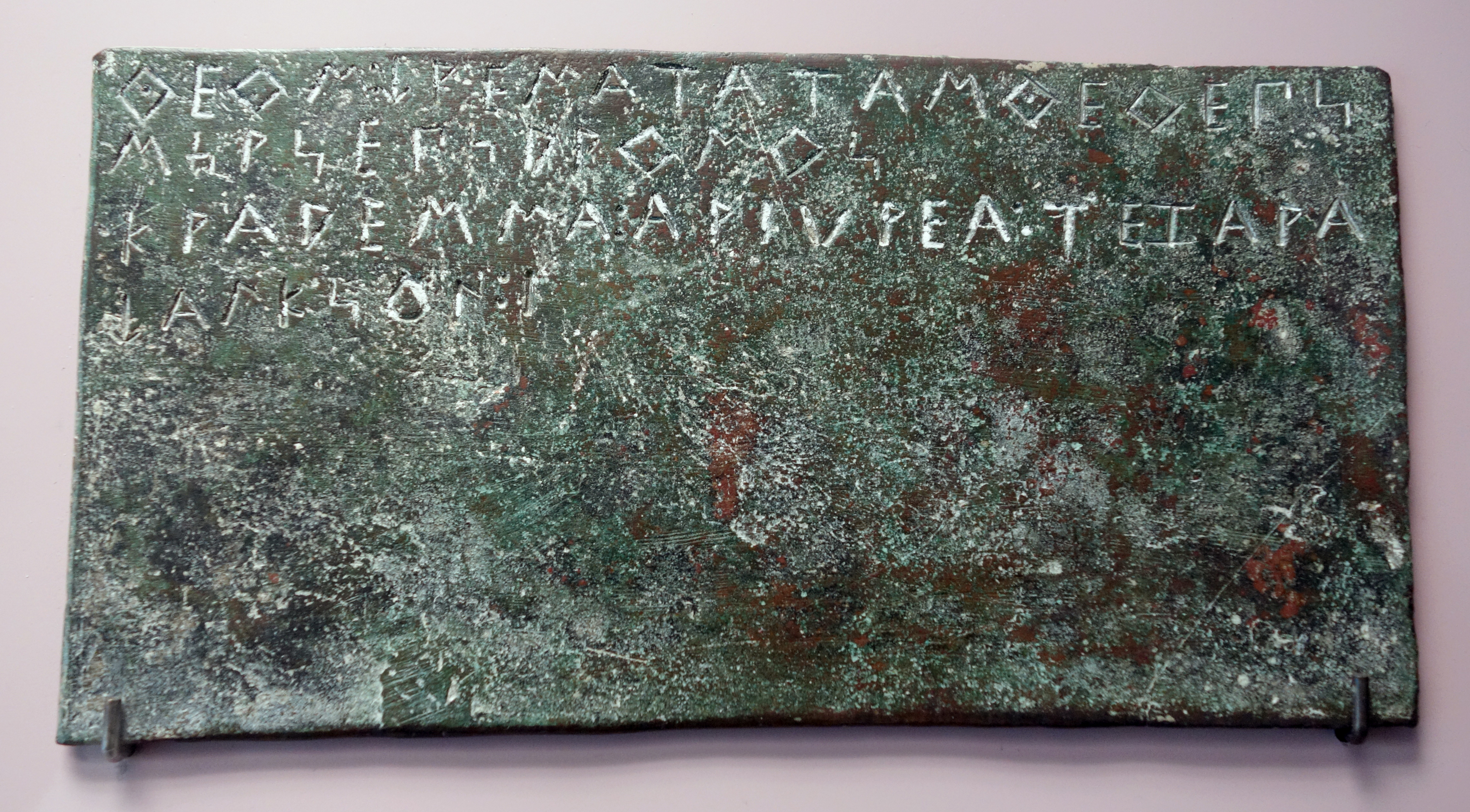
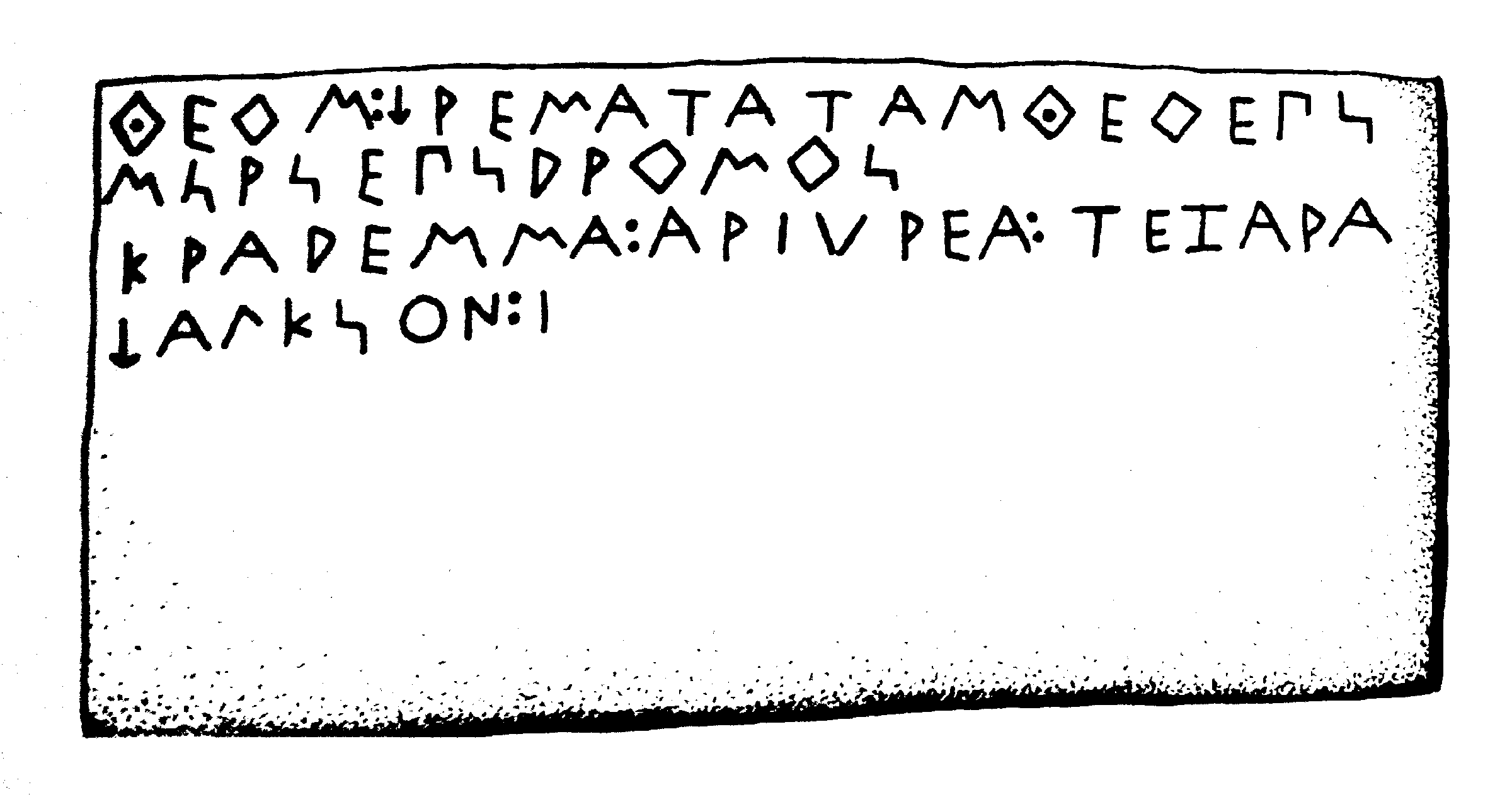
Inscribed bronze tablet from the sanctuary of an unnamed goddess at Siris, recording four silver diadems and one bronze vessel, late 6th–early 5th century BCE (SEG XIX 618; now in the Museo archeologico nazionale della Siritide, Policoro)

Siris (Greek: Σῖρις) was an ancient city of Magna Graecia (in modern Southern Italy), situated at the mouth of the river of the same name flowing into the Tarentine gulf, and now called the Sinni.

== History ==
Siris was a Greek colony which at one time attained to a great amount of wealth and prosperity; however, its history is extremely obscure and uncertain. Its first origin was generally ascribed to a Trojan colony; and, as a proof of this, an ancient statue of Minerva was shown there which claimed to be the true Trojan Palladium. Whatever may have been the origin of this legend, there seems no doubt that Siris was originally a city of the Chones, the native Oenotrian inhabitants of this part of Italy. A legend found in the Etymologicon, according to which the city derived its name from a daughter of Morges, king of the Siculi, evidently points in the same direction, as the Morgetes also were an Oenotrian tribe. From these first settlers it was wrested, as we are told, by a body of Ionian colonists from Colophon, who had fled from their native city to avoid the dominion of the Lydians. The period of this emigration is very uncertain; but it appears probable that it must have taken place not long after the capture of the city by Gyges, king of Lydia, about 700-690 BCE.

Archilochus, writing about 660 BCE, alludes to the fertility and beauty of the district on the banks of the Siris; and though the fragment preserved to us by Athenaeus does not expressly notice the existence of the city of that name, yet it would appear from the expressions of Athenaeus that the poet certainly did mention it; and the fact of this colony having been so lately established there was doubtless the cause of his allusion to it. On the other hand, it seems clear from the account of the settlement at Metapontum, that the territory of Siris was at that time still unoccupied by any Greek colony. We may therefore probably place the date of the Ionian settlement at Siris between 690 and 660 BCE. We are told that the Ionic colonists gave to the city the name of Polieum; but the appellation of Siris, which it derived from the river, and which seems to have been often given to the whole district (ἡ Σῖρις, used as equivalent to ἡ Σιρῖτις), evidently prevailed, and is the only one met with in common use.

Of the history of Siris we know very little, except the general fact of its prosperity, and that its citizens indulged in habits of luxury and lack of vigor that rivalled those of their neighbours the Sybarites. It may be received as an additional proof of their opulence, that Damasus, a citizen of Siris, is noticed by Herodotus among the suitors for the daughter of Cleisthenes of Sicyon, about 580 BCE-560 BCE, on which occasion Siris and Sybaris among the cities of Italy alone furnished claimants. This was probably about the period that Siris was at the height of its prosperity. But an Ionian city, existing as it did in the midst of the powerful Achaean colonies, must naturally have been an object of jealousy to its neighbors; and hence we are told that the Metapontines, Sybarites, and Crotoniats formed a league against Siris; and the war that ensued ended in the capture of the city, which appears to have been followed by the expulsion of the inhabitants.

The date of the destruction of Siris cannot be fixed with any approach to certainty: it was probably after 550 BCE, and certainly preceded the fall of its rival Sybaris in 510 BCE. Its ruin appears to have been complete, for we meet with no subsequent mention of the city, and the territory is spoken of as open to colonisation at the time of the Persian War, 480 BCE.) Upon that occasion we learn incidentally that the Athenians considered themselves as having a claim of old standing to the vacant district of the Sirites, and even at one time thought of removing thither with their wives and families. The origin of this claim is unknown; but it seems pretty clear that it was taken up by the Athenian colonists who established themselves at Thurii in 443 BCE, and became the occasion of hostilities between them and the Tarentines. These were at length terminated by a compromise, and it was agreed to found in common a fresh colony in the disputed territory. This appears to have been at first established on the site of the ancient city, but was soon after transferred to a spot 5 km distant, where the new colony received the name of Heraclea, and soon rose to be a flourishing city.

According to Strabo, Siris still continued to exist as the port or naval station of Heracleia; but no other mention of it is found, and it is not clear whether Strabo himself meant to speak of it as still subsisting in his day. No remains of it are extant, and the exact site does not appear to have been determined. But it may be placed on the left bank of the river Siris (Sinni), at or near its mouth; a position which well accords with the distance of 24 stadia (5 km) from Heraclea, the remains of which latter are visible at Policoro, near the river Agri, the ancient Aciris. A modern comune, Nova Siri, of the Province of Matera, Basilicata, seems to preserve the name and accords well with the expected location of the city, but no definitive evidence has confirmed this.
