= Heraclea (Lucania) =

Ancient city of Magna Graecia

- Ἡράκλεια (Ancient Greek)
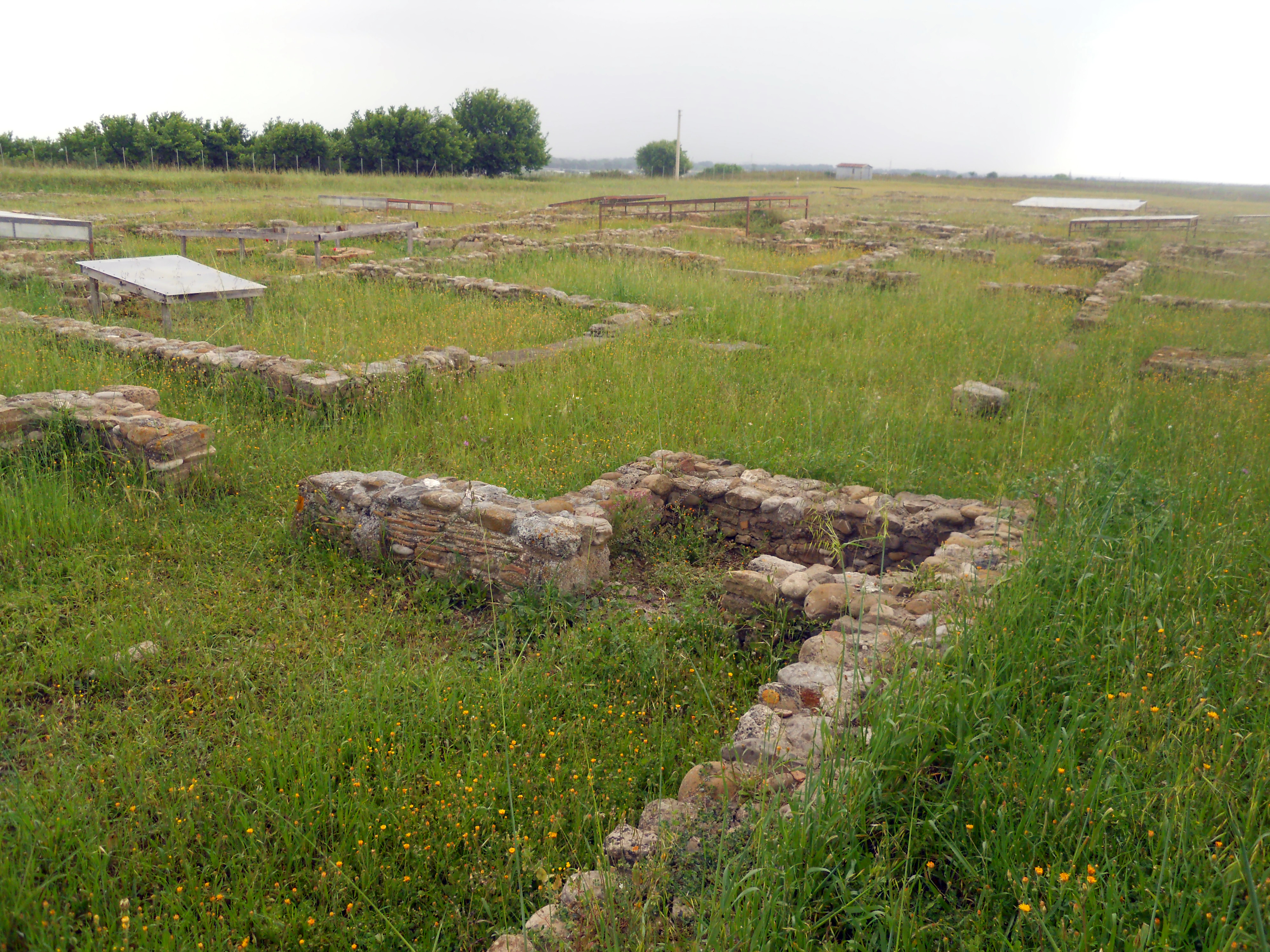
- Foundations of building walls at Heraclea

- Location within Italy
- 40°13′12″N 16°40′11″E
- Type: Settlement
- Location: Policoro, Province of Matera, Basilicata, Italy
- Region: Magna Graecia

History
- Built: 432 BCE
- Built by: Colonists from Tarentum and Siris
- Event: Battle of Heraclea

Site notes
- Condition: Ruined
- Owner: Public
- Management: Soprintendenza per i Beni Archeologici della Basilicata
- Public access: Yes
- Website: Area archeologica di Herakleia (in Italian)

Heraclea, also Heracleia or Herakleia (Ancient Greek: Ἡράκλεια), was an ancient city. It was situated on the Gulf of Taranto between the rivers Aciris (modern Agri) and Siris (modern Sinni). The ruins of the city are located in the modern comune of Policoro in the Province of Matera, Basilicata, Italy.

== History ==
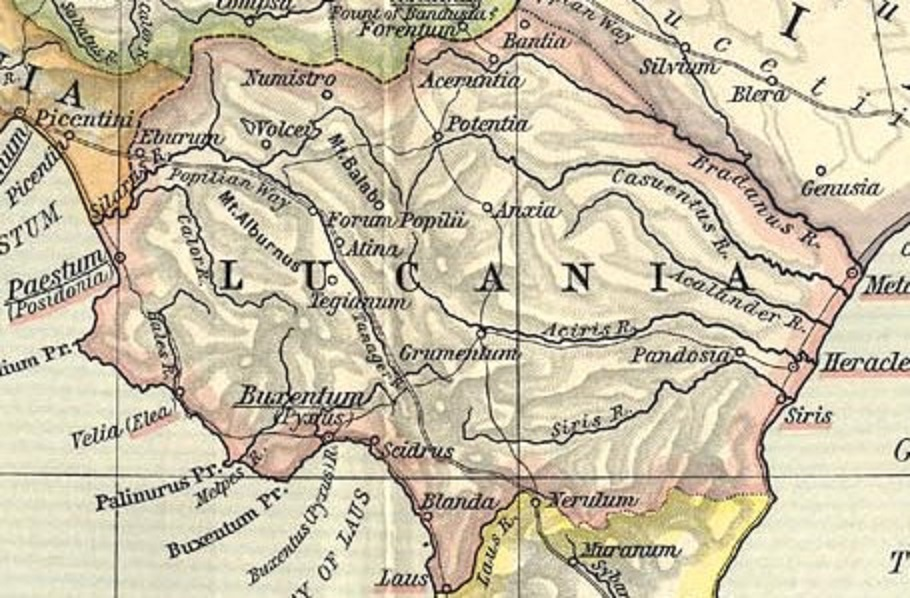
Map of ancient Lucania showing Heraclea (center right)

It was a Greek colony, but founded at a period considerably later than most of the other Greek cities in this part of Italy. The territory in which it was established had previously belonged to the Ionic colony of Siris, and after the fall of that city seems to have become the subject of contention between the neighboring states. The Athenians had a claim upon the territory of Siris, and it was probably in virtue of this that their colonists the Thurians, almost immediately after their establishment in Italy, advanced similar pretensions. These were, however, resisted by the Tarentines; and war ensued between the two states, which was at length terminated by an arrangement that they should found a new colony in the disputed district, which, though in fact a joint settlement, should be designated as a colony of Tarentum (modern Taranto). The few remaining inhabitants of Siris were added to the new colonists, and it would appear that the settlement was first established on the ancient site of Siris itself, but was subsequently transferred thence, and an ancient, but new city founded about 24 stadia from the former, and nearer the river Aciris, to which the name of Heraclea was given. Siris did not cease to exist, but lapsed into the subordinate condition of the port or emporium of Heraclea. The foundation of the new city is placed by Diodorus in 432 BCE, fourteen years after the settlement of Thurii; a statement which appears to agree well with the above narrative, cited by Strabo from Antiochus of Syracuse. Diodorus, as well as Livy, calls it simply a colony of Tarentum. Antiochus is the only writer who mentions the share taken by the Thurians in its original foundation. Pliny erroneously regards Heraclea as identical with Siris, to which it had succeeded; and it was perhaps a similar misconception that led Livy, by a strange anachronism, to include Heraclea among the cities of Magna Graecia where Pythagoras established his institutions.

The new colony appears to have risen rapidly to power and prosperity, protected by the fostering care of the Tarentines, who were at one time engaged in war with the Messapians for its defence. It was probably owing to the predominant influence of Tarentum also that Heraclea was selected as the place of meeting of the general assembly (πανήγυρις) of the Italiot Greeks; a meeting apparently originally of a religious character, but of course easily applicable to political objects, and which for that reason Alexander, king of Epirus, sought to transfer to the Thurians for the purpose of weakening the influence of Tarentum.

But beyond the general fact that it enjoyed great wealth and prosperity, advantages which it doubtless owed to the noted fertility of its territory, we have scarcely any information concerning the history of Heraclea until we reach a period when it was already beginning to decline. We cannot doubt that it took part with the Tarentines in their wars against the Messapians and Lucanians, and it appears to have fallen gradually into a state of almost dependence upon that city, though without ever ceasing to be, in name at least, an independent state. Hence, when Alexander, king of Epirus, who had been invited to Italy by the Tarentines, subsequently became hostile to that people, he avenged himself by taking Heraclea, and, as already mentioned, transferred to the Thurians the general assemblies that had previously been held there. During the war of Pyrrhus with the Romans, Heraclea was the scene of the first conflict between the two powers, the consul Laevinus being totally defeated by the Epirot king in a battle (subsequently called the Battle of Heraclea) fought between the city of Heraclea and the river Siris, 280 BCE.

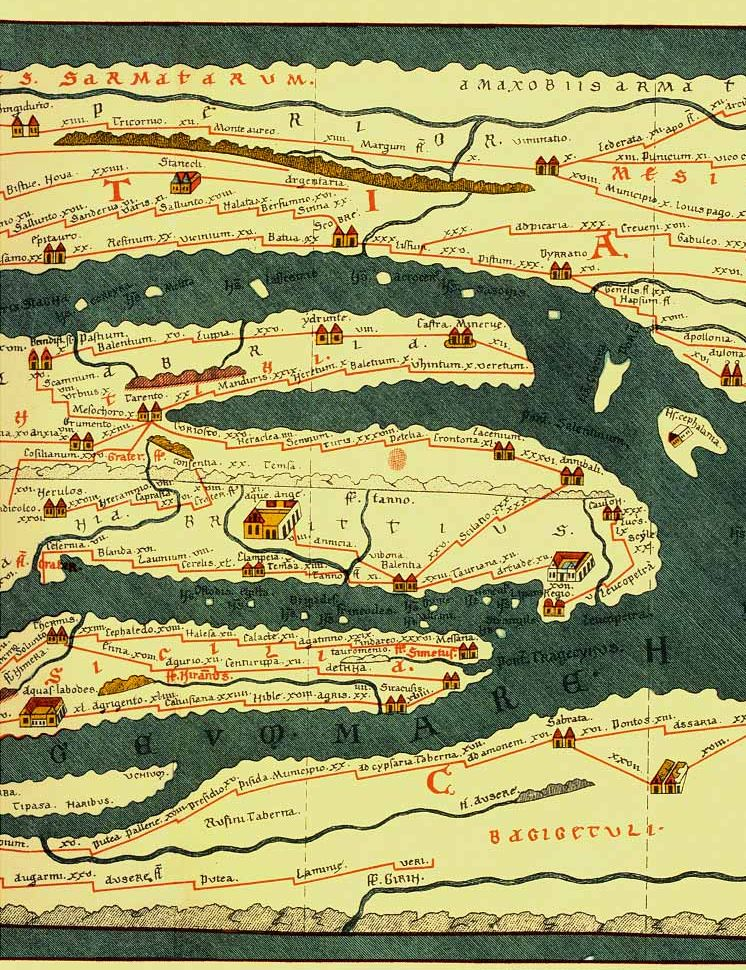
Section of the 4th century Tabula Peutingeriana showing Heraclea.

Heraclea was certainly at this time in alliance with the Tarentines and Lucanians against Rome; and it was doubtless with the view of detaching it from this alliance that the Romans were induced shortly afterwards (278 BCE) to grant to the Heracleans a treaty of alliance on such favorable terms that it is called by Cicero prope singulare foedus. Heraclea preserved this privileged condition throughout the period of the Roman Republic; and hence, even when in 89 BCE the Lex Plautia Papiria conferred upon its inhabitants, in common with the other cities of Italy, the rights of Roman citizens, they hesitated long whether they would accept the proffered boon. We hear that Heraclea surrendered under compulsion to Hannibal in 212 BCE. We have no account of the part taken by Heraclea in the Social War; but from an incidental notice in Cicero, that all the public records of the city had been destroyed by fire at that period, it would seem to have suffered severely. Cicero nevertheless speaks of it, in his defence of the poet Aulus Licinius Archias (who had been adopted as a citizen of Heraclea), as still a flourishing and important town, and it appears to have been one of the few Greek cities in the south of Italy that still preserved their consideration under the Roman dominion. Its name is unaccountably omitted by the 2nd century AD geographer Ptolemy; but its existence at a much later period is attested by the Antonine Itinerary and the Tabula Peutingeriana. It was still a place of some importance under the empire; a branch road from Venusia joined the coast road at Heraclea.

The time and circumstances of its final extinction are wholly unknown, but the site is now desolate, and the whole neighbouring district, once celebrated as one of the most fertile in Italy, was by the mid-19th century almost wholly uninhabited. The position of the ancient city may nevertheless be clearly identified; and though no ruins worthy of the name are still extant, large heaps of rubbish and foundations of ancient buildings mark the site of Heraclea near Policoro, about 5 km from the sea, and a short distance from the right bank of the Aciris. Numerous coins, bronzes, and other relics of antiquity have been discovered on the spot. A medieval town, Anglona, was founded on the site; however, once a bishopric, now itself is but a heap of ruins, among which are those of an 11th-century church.

== Tabulae Heracleenses ==
The bronze tablets commonly known as the Tables of Heraclea (Tabulae Heracleenses), were found a short distance from the site of Heraclea, between it and Metapontum. They are significant in the study of Roman Law.

== Art ==
Heraclea is generally regarded as the native country of the celebrated painter Zeuxis, though there is much doubt to which of the numerous cities of the name that distinguished artist really owed his birth. But the flourishing state of the arts in the Lucanian Heraclea (in common with most of the neighbouring cities of Magna Graecia) is attested by the beauty and variety of its coins, some of which may deservedly be reckoned among the choicest specimens of Greek art; while their number sufficiently proves the opulence and commercial activity of the city to which they belong.

== Gallery ==
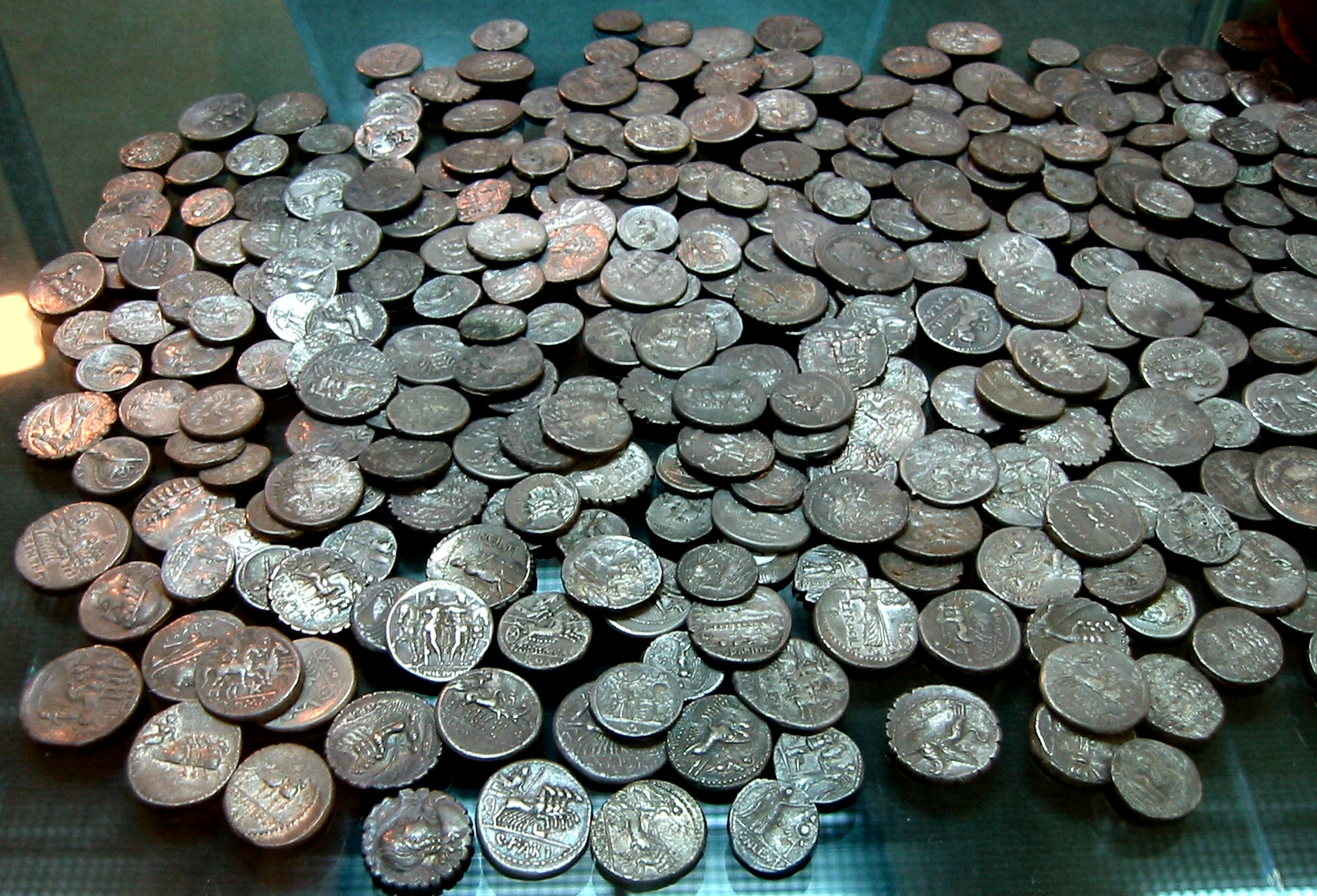
Coins found during excavations

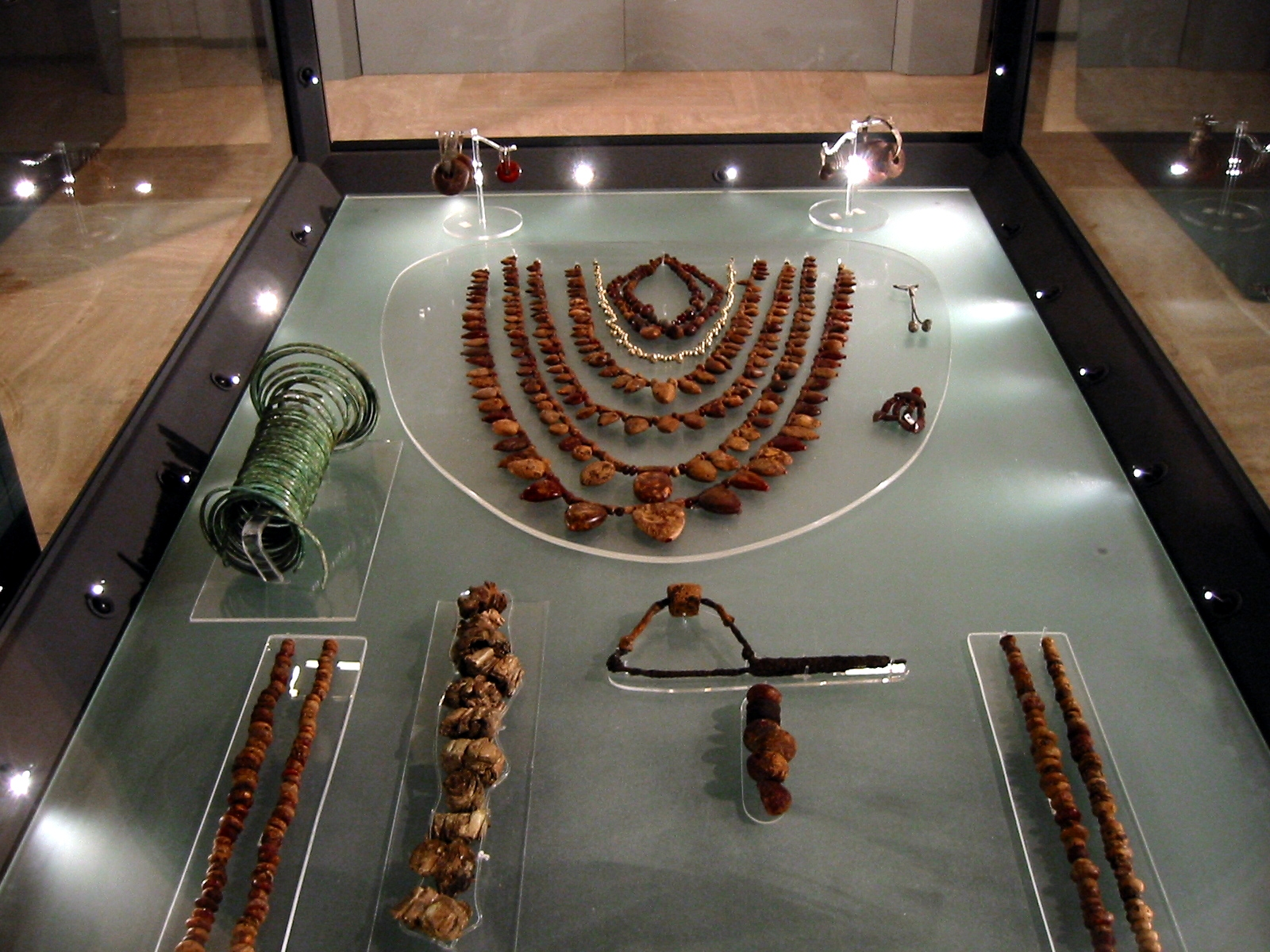
Jewelry found during excavations

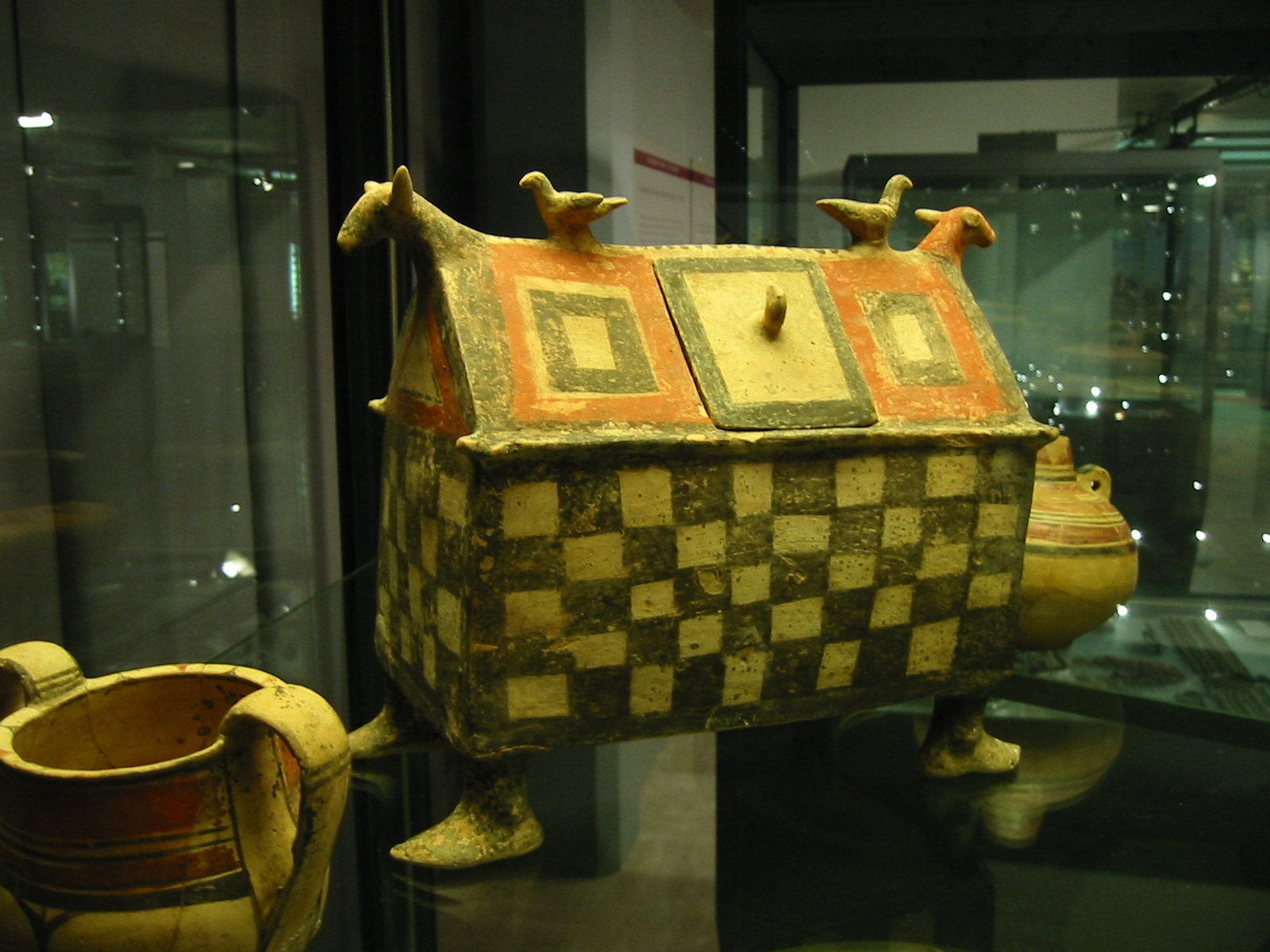
Pottery found during the excavations

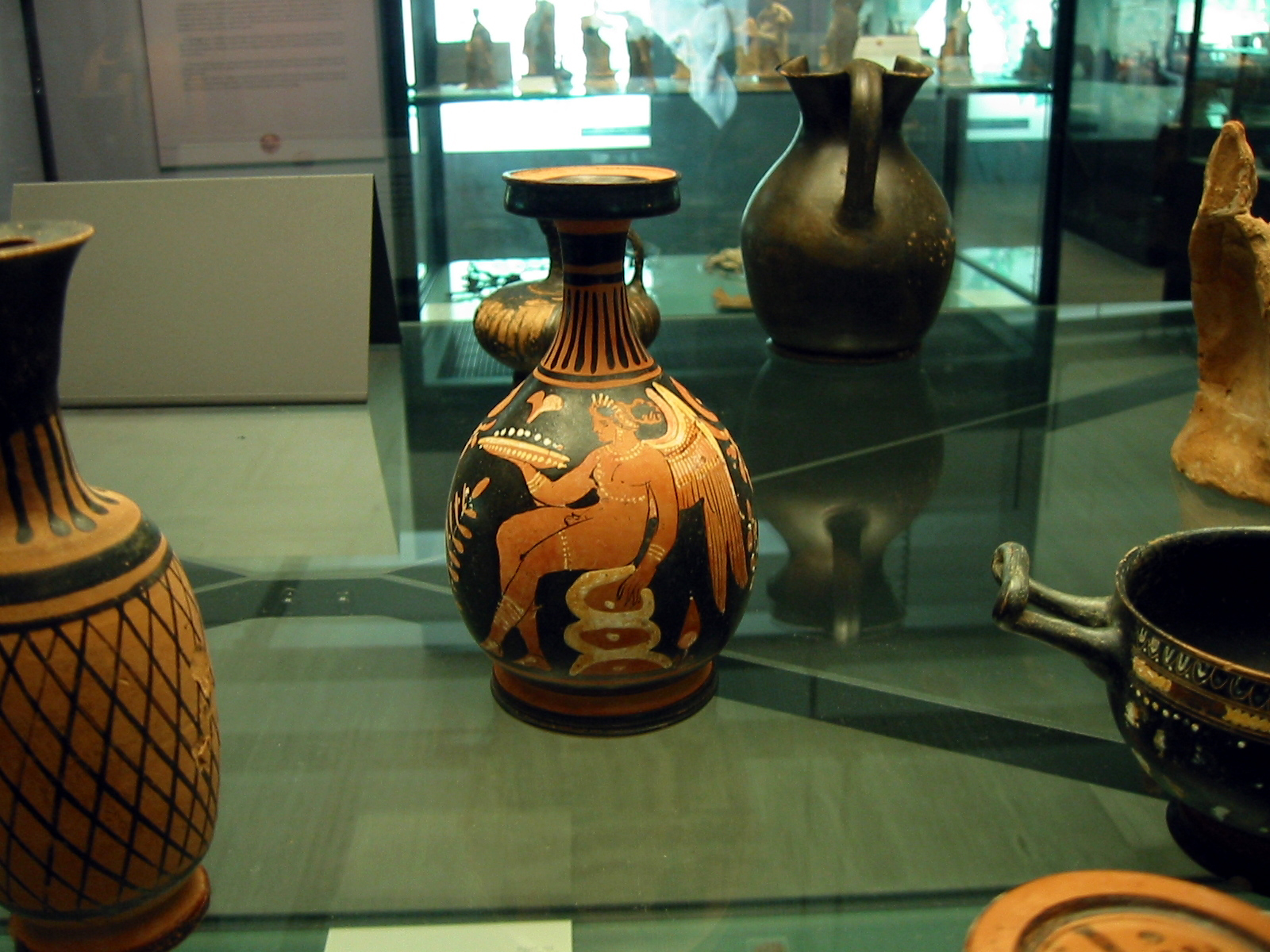
Pottery found during the excavations

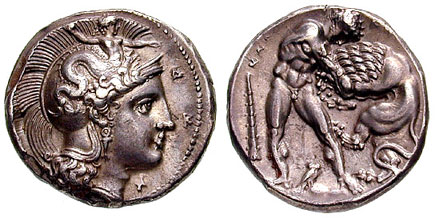
Silver coin from Heraclea (390-340 BC). Obv. Head of Athena with inscription ΗΡΑΚΛΗΙΩΝ, i.e. "of Heracleans". Rev. Herakles wrestling with the Nemean lion.

== See also ==
- List of ancient Greek cities
