= Metapontum =

Greek colony of Magna Graecia

- Μεταπόντιον (Ancient Greek)
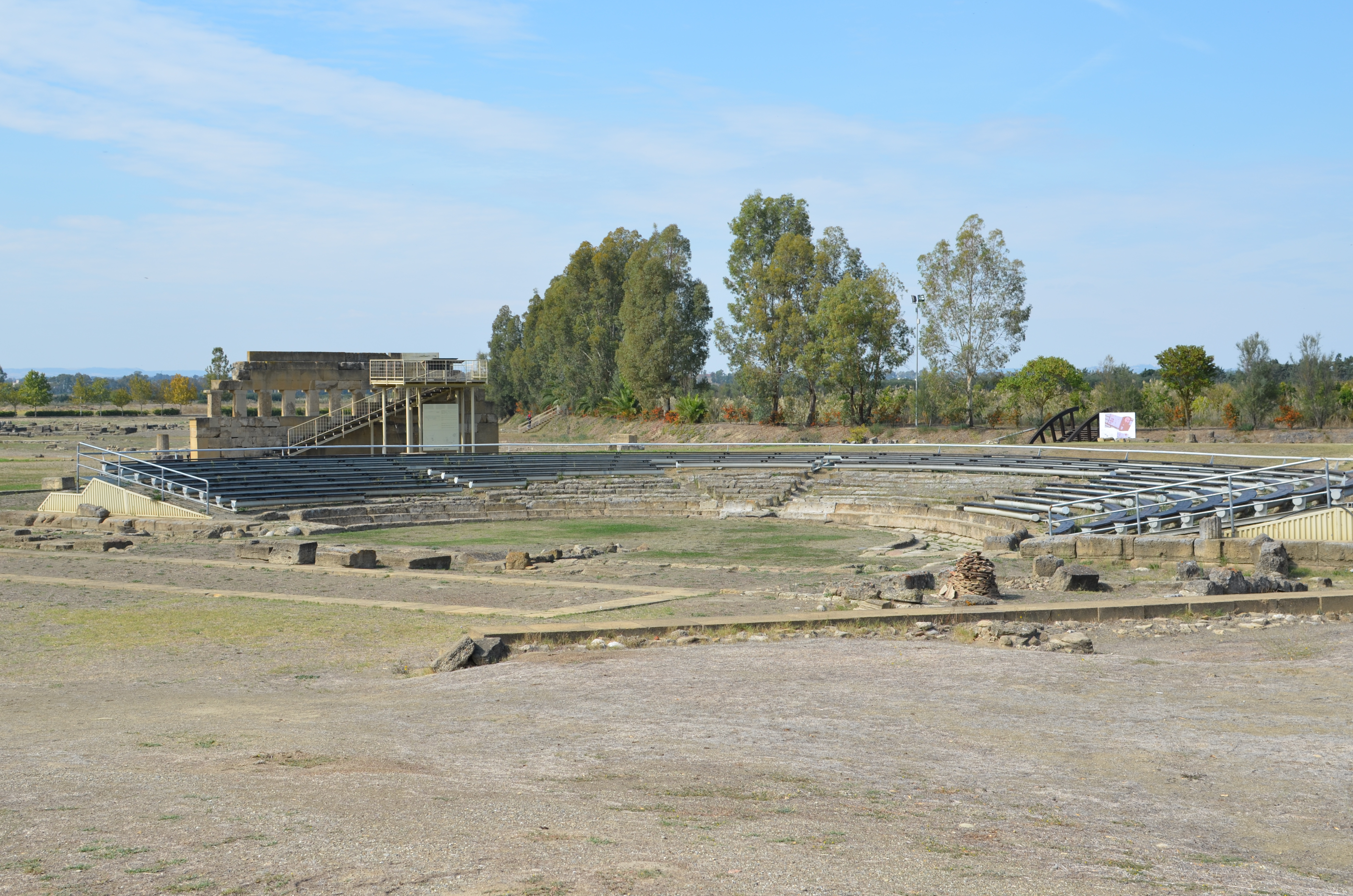
- The theater of Metapontum was built on top of an older ekklesiasterion.

- Location within Italy
- 40°23′00″N 16°49′28″E
- Type: Settlement
- Periods: Archaic Greece to Roman Empire
- Associated with: Pythagoras
- Location: Metaponto, Province of Matera, Basilicata, Italy
- Region: Magna Graecia

History
- Built: Between 700 and 690 BCE

Site notes
- Area: 150 ha (370 acres)
- Management: Soprintendenza per i Beni Archeologici della Basilicata
- Website: Area archeologica di Metaponto (in Italian)

Metapontum or Metapontium (Ancient Greek: Μεταπόντιον, romanized: Metapontion) was an ancient city of Magna Graecia, the area of southern Italy colonized by Greeks. It was situated on the gulf of Tarentum between the river Bradanus and the Casuentus (modern Basento). It was about 20 km from Heraclea and 40 from Tarentum. The ruins of Metapontum are located in the frazione of Metaponto, in the comune of Bernalda, in the Province of Matera, Basilicata region, southern Italy.

== History ==
=== Foundation ===
Though Metapontum was an ancient Achaean Greek colony, various traditions assigned a much earlier origin. Strabo and Gaius Julius Solinus ascribe its foundation to a body of Pylians who had followed Nestor in the Trojan War. Justin, conversely, tells us it was founded by Epeius; in proof of which the inhabitants showed, in a temple of Minerva, the tools which the hero had used to build the Trojan Horse. Another tradition, reported by Ephorus, says that the town was founded by Phocians under the leadership of Daulius, tyrant of Crisa. Other legends carried back its origin to a still more remote period. Antiochus of Syracuse said that it was originally named after the hero Metabus, who appears to have been identified with Metapontus, husband of Melanippe and father of Aeolus and Boeotus.

=== Early history ===
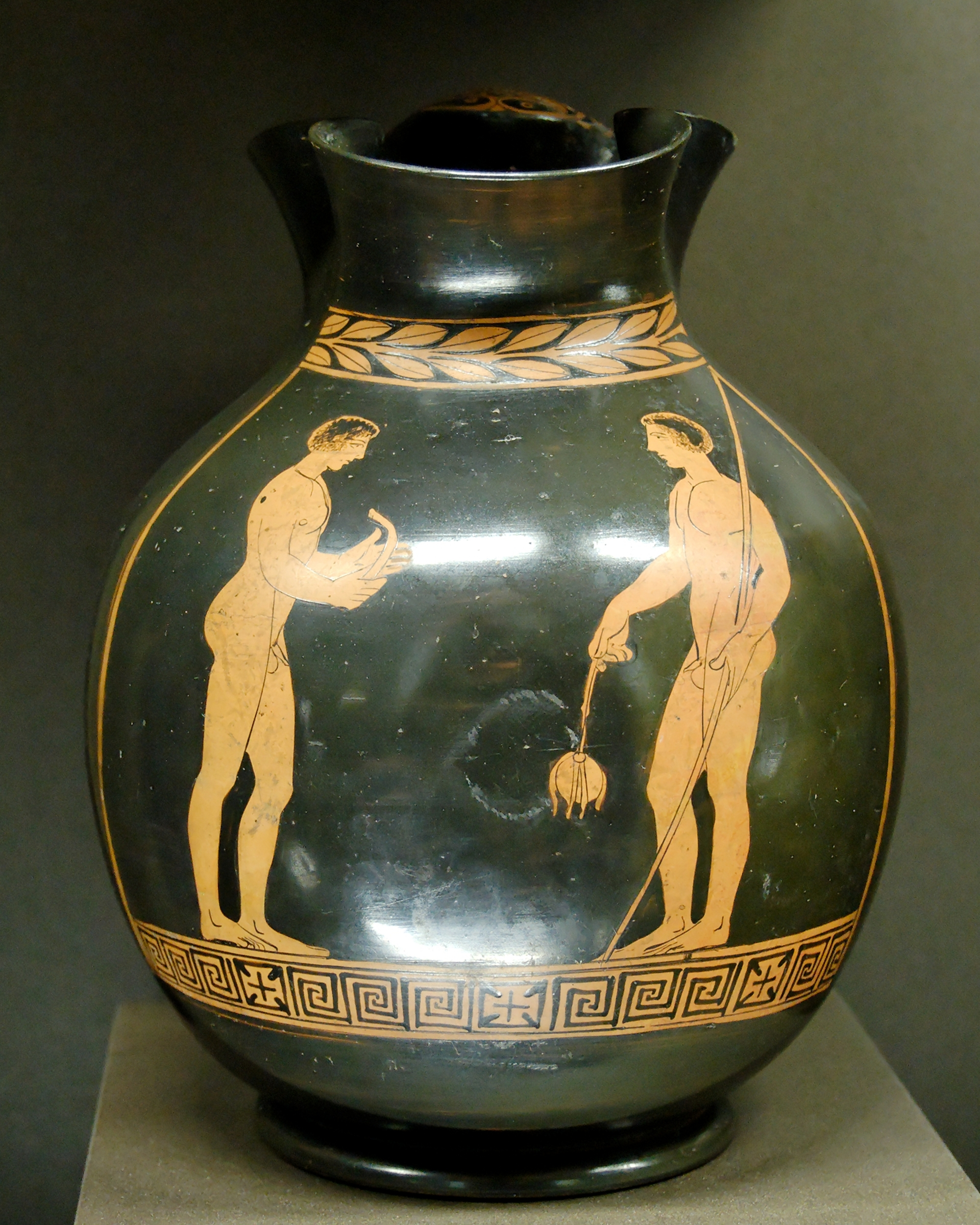
An oenochoe (wine jug) found near Metapontum.

Whether there may have really been a settlement on the spot more ancient than the Achaean colony, is impossible to be determined. It is known that at the time of the foundation of this city the site was unoccupied; the Achaean settlers at Crotona and Sybaris were therefore desirous to colonize it, in order to prevent the Tarentines from taking possession of it. With this view a colony was sent from the mother-country, under the command of a leader named Leucippus, who, according to one account, was compelled to obtain the territory by a fraudulent treaty. Another and a more plausible statement is that the new colonists were at first engaged in a contest with the Tarentines, as well as the neighbouring tribes of the Oenotrians, which was at length terminated by a treaty, leaving them in the peaceable possession of the territory they had acquired. The date of the colonization of Metapontum cannot be determined with certainty; but it was evidently, from the circumstances just related, subsequent to that of Tarentum, as well as of Sybaris and Crotona: hence the date assigned by Eusebius, who would carry it back as far as 774 BCE, is wholly untenable; nor is it easy to see how such an error can have arisen. It may probably be referred to about 700-690 BCE.

There are very few mentions of Metapontum during the first ages of its existence; however, it seems certain that it rose rapidly to a considerable amount of prosperity, for which it was indebted to the extreme fertility of its territory. The same policy which had led to its foundation would naturally unite it in the bonds of a close alliance with the other Achaean cities, Sybaris and Crotona; and the first occasion on which we meet with its name in history is as joining with these two cities in a league against Siris, with the view of expelling the Ionian colonists of that city. The war seems to have ended in the capture and destruction of Siris, but our account of it is very obscure, and the period at which it took place very uncertain. It does not appear that Metapontum took any part in the war between Crotona and Sybaris, which ended in the destruction of the latter city; but its name is frequently mentioned in connection with the changes introduced by Pythagoras, and the troubles consequent upon them. Metapontum appears to have been one of the cities where the doctrines and sect of that philosopher obtained the firmest footing. Even when the Pythagoreans were expelled from Crotona, they maintained themselves at Metapontum, where the philosopher himself retired, and where he ended his days. The Metapontines paid the greatest respect to his memory; they consecrated the house in which he had lived as a temple to Ceres, and gave to the street in which it was situated the name of the Museum. His tomb was still shown there in the days of Cicero. The Metapontines were afterwards called in as mediators to appease the troubles which had arisen at Crotona; and appear, therefore, to have suffered comparatively little themselves from civil dissensions arising from this source.

=== Peloponnesian War ===
At the time of the Athenian expedition to Sicily, 415 BCE, the Metapontines at first, like the other states of Magna Graecia, endeavoured to maintain a strict neutrality; but in the following year were induced to enter into an alliance with Athens, and furnish a small auxiliary force to the armament under Demosthenes and Eurymedon. It seems clear that Metapontum was at this time a flourishing and opulent city. From its position it was secured from the attacks of Dionysius of Syracuse; and though it must have been endangered in common with the other Greek cities by the advancing power of the Lucanians, it does not appear to have taken any prominent part in the wars with that people, and probably suffered but little from their attacks. Its name is again mentioned in 345 BCE, when Timoleon touched there on his expedition to Sicily, but it does not appear to have taken any part in his favour. In 332 BCE, when Alexander, king of Epirus, crossed over into Italy at the invitation of the Tarentines, the Metapontines were among the first to conclude an alliance with that monarch, and support him in his wars against the Lucanians and Bruttians. Hence, after his defeat and death at Pandosia, 326 BCE, it was to Metapontum that his remains were sent for interment. But some years later, 303 BCE, when Cleonymus of Sparta was in his turn invited by the Tarentines, the Metapontines, for what reason we know not, pursued a different policy, and incurred the resentment of that leader, who, in consequence, turned his own arms, as well as those of the Lucanians, against them. He was then admitted into the city on friendly terms, but nevertheless exacted from them a large sum of money, and committed various other excesses. It is evident that Metapontum was at this period still wealthy; but its citizens had apparently, like their neighbors the Tarentines, fallen into a state of slothfulness and luxury, so that they were become almost proverbial for their lack of vigor.

=== Pyrrhic War and Roman domination ===
It seems certain that the Metapontines, as well as the Tarentines, lent an active support to Pyrrhus, when that monarch came over to Italy; however, they are not mentioned during his wars there, nor it is known the precise period at which they passed under the yoke of Rome. Their name is, however, again mentioned repeatedly in the Second Punic War. They were among the first to declare in favor of Hannibal after the battle of Cannae; but notwithstanding this, their city was occupied by a Roman garrison some years later, and it was not until after the capture of Tarentum, in 212 BCE, that they were able to rid themselves of this force and openly espouse the Carthaginian cause. Hannibal now occupied Metapontum with a Carthaginian garrison, and seems to have made it one of his principal places of deposit, until the fatal battle of the Metaurus having compelled him to give up the possession of this part of Italy, 207 BCE, he withdrew his forces from Metapontum, and, at the same time, removed from thence all the inhabitants in order to save them from the vengeance of Rome.

=== Decline ===
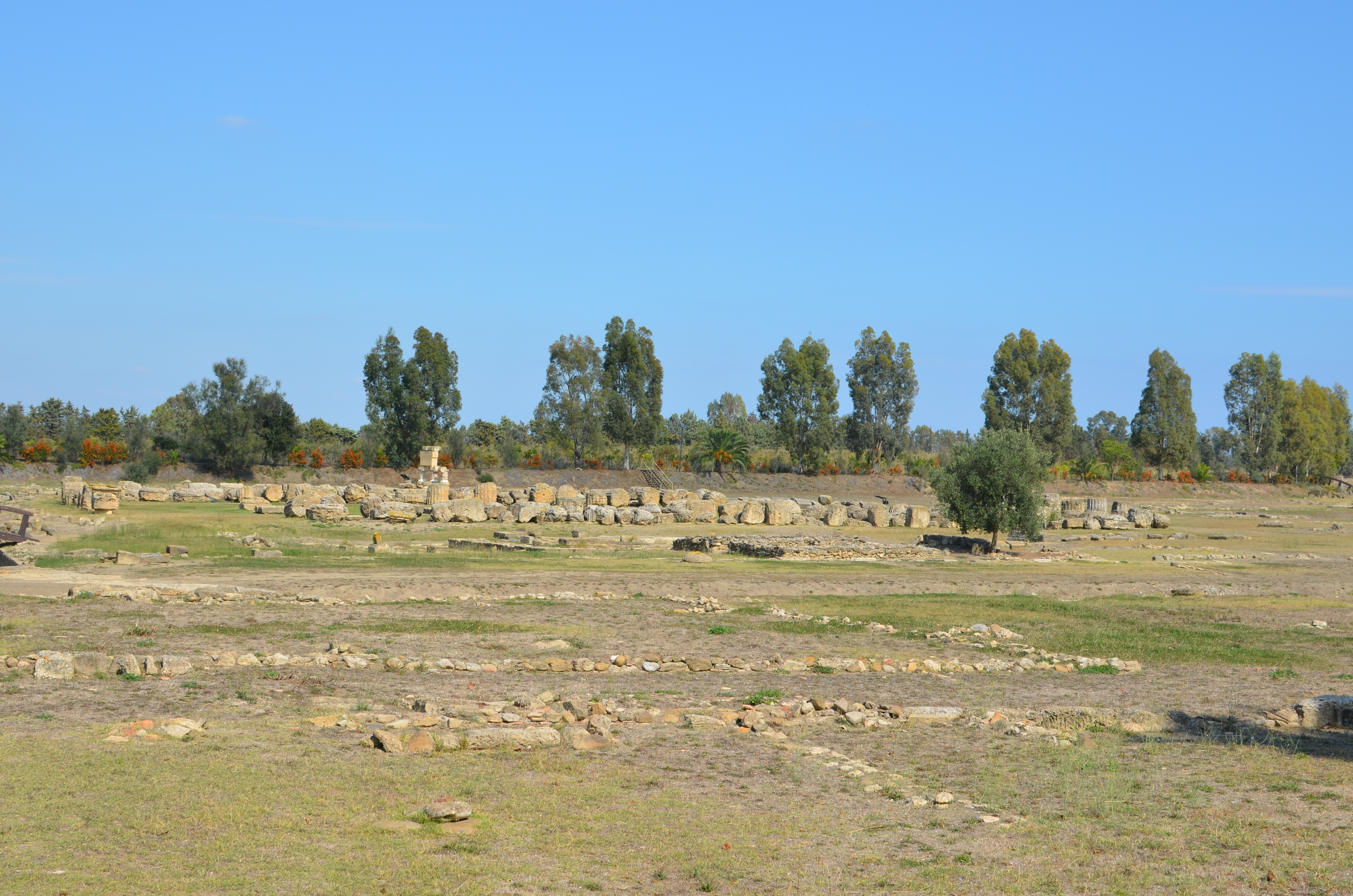
The remains of the four temples

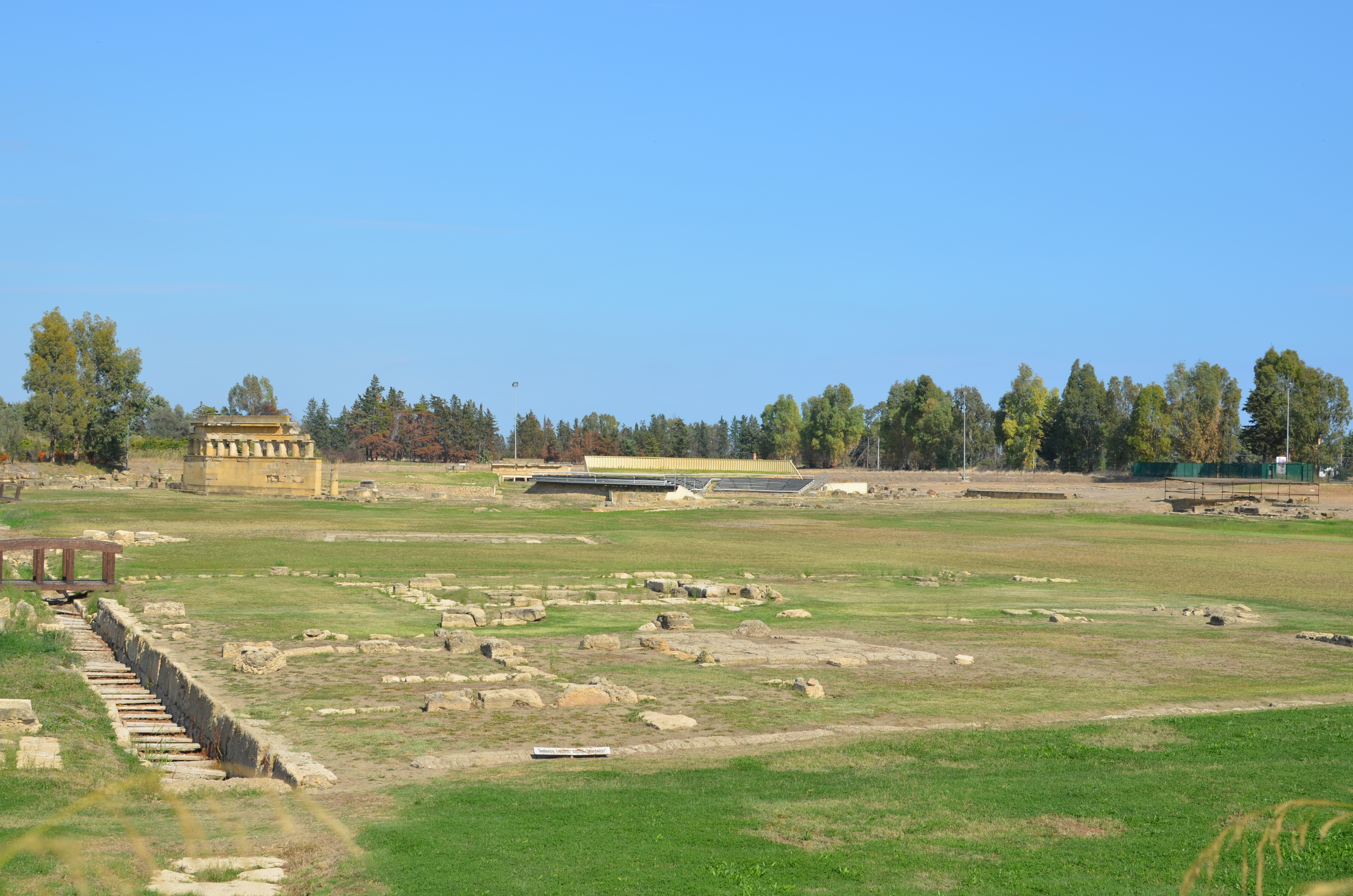
The manteion, with the theater in the background.

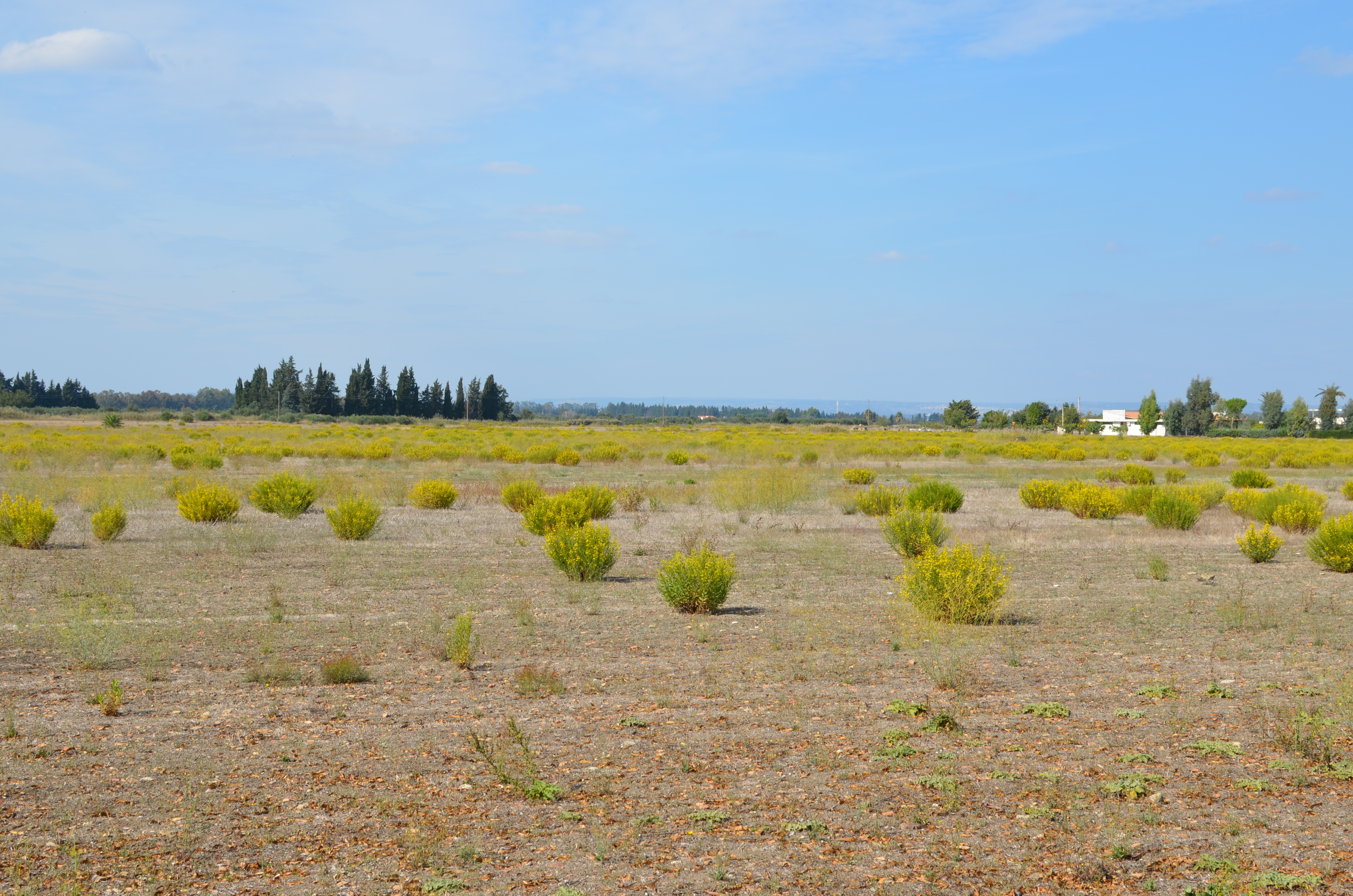
The remains of the residential quarters are no longer visible.

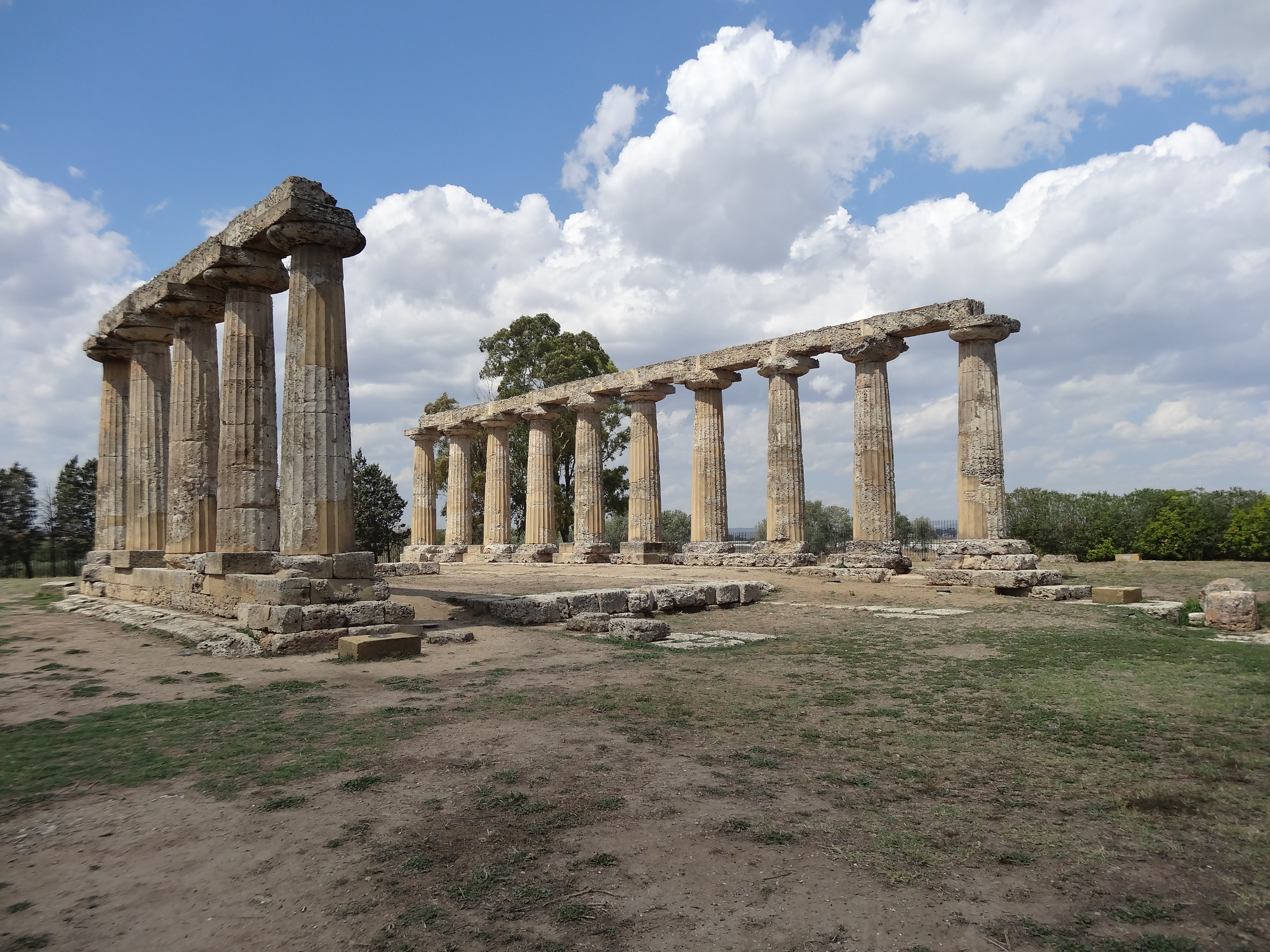
The Temple of Hera at Tavole Palatine, a sanctuary near Metapontum.

From this time the name of Metapontum does not again appear prominently in classical history; and it seems certain that it never recovered from the blow thus inflicted on it. But it did not altogether cease to exist; for its name is found in Pomponius Mela who does not notice any extinct places; and Cicero speaks of visiting it in terms that show it was still a town. That orator, however, elsewhere alludes to the cities of Magna Graecia as being in his day sunk into almost complete decay; Strabo says the same thing, and Pausanias tells that Metapontum in particular was in his time completely in ruins, and nothing remained of it but the theatre and the circuit of its walls. Hence, though the name is still found in Ptolemy, and the ager Metapontinus is noticed in the Liber Coloniarum (p. 262), all trace of the city subsequently disappears, and it is not even noticed in the Antonine Itineraries where they give the line of route along the coast from Tarentum to Thurii. The site was probably already subject to malaria, and from the same cause has remained desolate ever since.

Though Metapontum is mentioned less than of Sybaris, Crotona, and Tarentum, yet all accounts agree in representing it as, in the days of its prosperity, one of the most opulent and flourishing of the cities of Magna Graecia. The fertility of its territory, especially in the growth of grain, vied with the neighbouring district of the Siritis. It is known that the Metapontines sent to the temple at Delphi an offering of a golden harvest, perhaps referring to a sheaf or bundle of grain wrought in gold. For the same reason an ear of grain became the characteristic symbol on their coins, the number and variety of which in itself sufficiently attests the wealth of the city. They had a treasury of their own at Olympia still existing in the days of Pausanias. Herodotus tells that they paid particular honors to Aristeas, who was said to have appeared in their city 240 years after he had disappeared from Cyzicus. They erected to him a statue in the middle of the forum, with an altar to Apollo surrounded by a grove of laurels. From their coins they would appear also to have paid heroic honours to Leucippus, as the founder of their city. Strabo tells, as a proof of their Pylian origin, that they continued to perform sacrifices to the Neleidae.

The site and remains of Metapontum have been carefully examined by the Duc de Luynes, who has illustrated them in a special work. No trace exists of the ancient walls or the theatre of which Pausanias speaks. The most important of the still existing buildings is a temple, the remains of which occupy a slight elevation near the right bank of the Bradanus, about 3 km from its mouth. They are now known as the Tavole Palatine. Fifteen columns are still standing, ten on one side and five on the other; but the two ends, as well as the whole of the entablature above the architrave and the walls of the cella, have wholly disappeared. The architecture is of the Doric order, but its proportions are lighter and more slender than those of the celebrated temples of Paestum: and it is in all probability of later date. Some remains of another temple, but prostrate, and a mere heap of ruins, are visible nearly 3 km to the south of the preceding, and a short distance from the mouth of the Bradanus. This spot, called the Chiesa di Sansone, appears to mark the site of the city itself, numerous foundations of buildings having been discovered all around it. It may be doubted whether the more distant temple was ever included within the walls; but it is impossible now to trace the extent of the ancient city. The Torre di Mare, now the only inhabited spot on the plain, derives its name from a castellated edifice of the Middle Ages; it is situated 2.5 km from the sea, and the same distance from the river Basiento, the ancient Casuentus. Immediately opposite to it, on the sea-shore, is a small salt-water basin or lagoon, now called the Lago di Santa Pelagina, which, though neither deep nor spacious, in all probability formed the ancient port of Metapontum.

Metapontum was thus situated between the two rivers Bradanus and Casuentus (Basento), and occupied (with its port and appurtenances) a considerable part of the intermediate space. Appian speaks of a river between Metapontum and Tarentum of the same name, by which he probably means the Bradanus, which may have been commonly known as the river of Metapontum. This is certainly the only river large enough to answer to the description which he gives of the meeting of Octavian and Antony which took place on its banks.

== Coinage ==
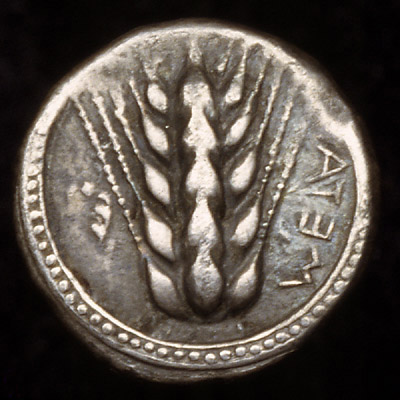
O: Six grained ear of wheat. META

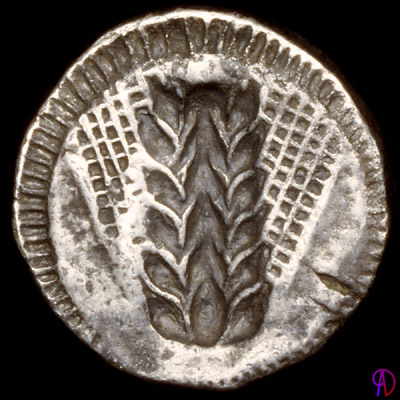
R: Incuse six grained ear of wheat.

Silver Drachm, Metapontum 465-440 BCE. Rutter 1485

The coins of Metapontum, as already observed, are very numerous; and many of the later ones of very beautiful workmanship. Those of more ancient date, like the early coins of Crotona and Sybaris, have an incuse fabric; that is to say that the relief design of the obverse is repeated intaglio on the reverse. Some have speculated that this feature was devised by Pythagoras. The die axes are always aligned.

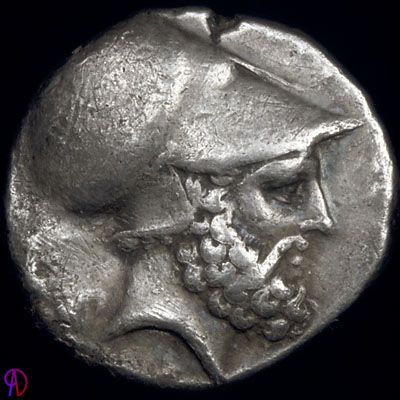
O: Bearded hd Leucippus w Corinthian helmet, sitting dog (Molossian hound?) behind.

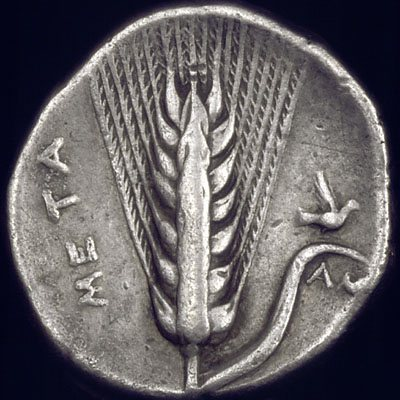
R: Head of wheat with leaf, bird, AMI rt. META lt.

Silver Drachm, Metapontum. 340-330 BCE. Rutter 1576

The more common type on later obverses is the head of Ceres but in the mid-late 4th century BCE, the head of the hero Leucippus, the reputed founder of the city appears for the first time. This is thought to be related to the expedition of Alexander I of Epirus to Southern Italy.
