= Name of Italy =

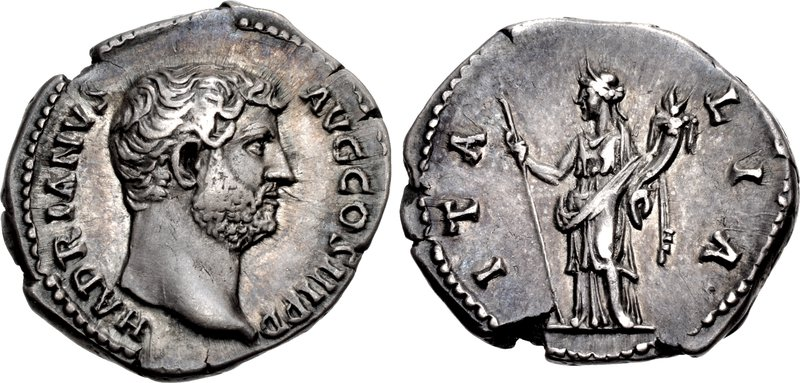
Coin of Hadrian's reign displaying the inscription ITALIA on the verge of the personification of Italy

The etymology of the name of Italy has been the subject of reconstructions by linguists and historians. Considerations extraneous to the specifically linguistic reconstruction of the name have formed a rich corpus of solutions that are either associated with legend (the existence of a king named Italus) or in any case strongly problematic (such as the connection of the name with the grape vine, vitis in Latin).

One theory is that the name derives from the word Italói, a term with which the ancient Greeks designated a tribe of Sicels who had crossed the Strait of Messina and who inhabited the extreme tip of the Italic Peninsula, near today's Catanzaro. This is attested by the fact that the ancient Greek peoples who colonized present-day Calabria, referred to themselves as Italiotes, that is, inhabitants of Italy. This group of Italian people had worshiped the simulacrum of a calf (vitulus, in Latin), and the name would therefore mean "inhabitants of the land of calves (young bulls)". In any case, it is known that in archaic times the name indicated the part located in the extreme south of the Italian Peninsula.

The name of Italy originally applied only to the tip of the Italian boot. As time progressed, the name "Italia" was extended further and further north until it reached the Alps in Roman times and became synonymous with the whole Italian geographical region.

== Hypothesis on etymology ==
=== The myth of Italus ===
The region, which is now called Italy, formerly held the Oenotrians; some time their king was Italus, and then they changed their name to Italics; succeeding Morgete, they were called Morgetes; later came a Siculus, who divided the peoples, who were then Morgeti and Sicels; and Italics were those who were Oenotrians

— Antiochus of Syracuse, in Dionysius of Halicarnassus 1, 12 vg

There are various legends about the character of Italus, king of the Oenotrians who, according to the myth, lived 16 generations before the Trojan War; the name "Italy" derives from him. Given first to the region corresponding to his kingdom, that is almost all of Calabria with the exception of the northern area. King Italus converted the Oenotrians from a nomadic people to a permanent one, establishing them in the extreme offshoot of the European coasts, in the current isthmus of Catanzaro between the Gulf of Squillace to the east and the Gulf of Saint Euphemia to the west. The capital of his kingdom, according to Strabo, was Pandosia Bruzia, today probably corresponding to the city of Acri.

According to Strabo, Antiochus of Syracuse (5th century BC) already spoke of the borders of Italy in his work On Italy, which identified it with the ancient Oenotrians. At that time it extended from the Strait of Sicily to the Gulf of Taranto (to the east) and the Gulf of Posidonia (to the west).

=== Italy as the land of calves (young bulls) ===
Ethnolinguistic map of Italy in the Iron Age, before the Roman expansion and conquest of Italy

Not all ancient authors adhered to the mythological version. Marcus Terentius Varro who, citing Timaeus, derives the word Italia from calves ("Italia a Vitulis") for the abundance and beauty of the calf (vitulus in Latin, pronounced [ˈu̯ɪt̪ʊɫ̪ʊs]; vitlu in Osco-Umbrian) in the region. The passage from the Vitalia form to Italia can in this case be explained by the simple fall of the initial consonant by means of classical Greek, in which the letter V is absent.

Other proposals that motivate the name beyond a real linguistic analysis can be remembered that of Domenico Romanelli, who, based on the ancient but never fully accepted hypothesis that it was related to the bulls (taurus in Latin), explained it with the fact that those who came from the sea from the west saw bull-like silhouettes in the Bruttia and Japigia peninsulas.

In ancient times the lands of present-day Calabria were known as Italy. The ancient Greeks indicated the origin of the name in Ouitoulía from the word "Italói" (plural of Italós), a term with which the Achaeans settlers who arrived in the lands of present-day Calabria ambiguously designated the Vitulis, a population that inhabited the lands of current southern Calabria whose ethnonym was etymologically related to the word indicating the bull, an animal sacred to the Vitulis. The ancient Greek italós is of Italic derivation from the Osco-Umbrian uitlu, precisely bull (see the Latin vitellus, form with diminutive suffix meaning calf). Ouitoulía thus came to mean "land of the Vitulis" or "land of the bulls". In support of this hypothesis, it is highlighted that in the southern part of the Calabrian peninsula, and in the Sicilian coast of the Strait of Messina, there are toponyms of Magna Graecia origin (some translated into Latin by the Normans) probably belonging to the most ancient etymology of the land of the bulls (of cattle). These include Tauriana, a city destroyed by the Saracens in the 10th century whose name survives today in the municipalities of Gioia Tauro, Taurianova, and Terranova Sappo Minulio, Bova, Bovalino and Itala.

The similarity with the name "Italy" of the last toponym, "Itala", is evident. Danish archaeologist and philologist Frederik Poulsen, in a study on the origin of the name "Italia", claimed that it was used for the first time in the 5th century BC, precisely with reference to the territory south of Messina where Itala is situated and where a population of the Oenotrians lived, which had a bull as its emblem ("Vitulus"). With the arrival of the ancient Greeks, the consonant V was eliminated from the word Vitulus, which disappeared in classical Greek, and only the word "Itulus" remained.

From the Oenotrians, the populations of the Italics, Morgetes and Sicels would then be distinguished. Subsequently, according to Poulsen, the name "Italy" was extended to the whole peninsula.

Catch from the Oenotrians, formerly Oenotria: now, as it is famous, having taken the name of Italus, Italy is called

— Virgil, Aeneid III, 165

Poulsen's thesis, however, seems to be questioned by the fact that the oldest documentable toponymic form for Itala is that of Gitala, as shown by a donation diploma from Count Roger of 1093. The name would then undergo many variations over the centuries: Quitala, Gitalas, Gytalas, Kitala, Hitala and finally Itala.

=== Greek origin ===
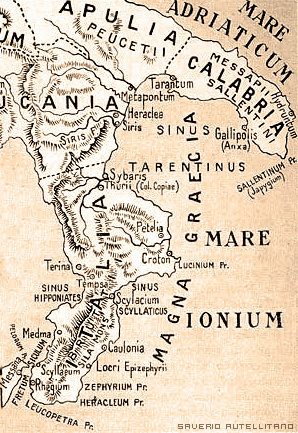
Italy according to the ancient Greeks, corresponding to the current Calabria

In ancient Greek tradition the name revived the theory of expansion from south to north in that the ancient Greeks would gradually apply the name "Italy" to an ever wider region, until the time of the Roman conquest, when it was extended to the entire peninsula.

For some linguists who supported this theory, the name would be based on a hypothetical ancient Greek form such as Aἰθαλία (Aithalía) which in its initial part Aith- (typical of words referring to fire) would contain a reference to the volcanic dimension of the lands of the peninsula. This meaning would resist for example in the name of Etna, in ancient Greek "Aitna". This proposal had already been advanced by Gabriele Rosa, according to whom the first ancient Greeks who arrived in the peninsula would have called it precisely:

Aιθαλια (Italy) volcanic, or flaming and sooty, for the same reason that the islands of Elba (Ilva), Lemnos and Chios, full of forges, said Aιθαλια

— Gabriele Rosa

Rosa, however, did not address and clarify the strictly linguistic arguments that had led him to such a solution, thus leaving his proposal in the pre-scientific dimension.

It was mainly Silvestri who recovered this theory, assuming three ancient Greek or Proto-Greek bases ("Aitalía", "Eitalía", and "Etalía") in order to give scientific basis to the proposal. According to this theory, Italy would originally have meant "fiery land", "land of the fiery sunset" (or "land of the West"), or "smoking land".

For Felice Vinci, this solution would solve the problem of the long i length of the word Italia, that conflicts with the short i length of the word vitulus, word from that the toponym should derive according to the most credited theory. On the contrary, following the theory of the Greek origin, the long i quantity is not an exception, because it should derive from the Greek diphthong Aι.

=== Etruscan origin ===
This theory is opposed by that which, with a solution that has authoritative precedents and yet little remembered in its most recent revival, proposes an Etruscan solution of the name of Italy; it is a reconstruction that deems the "Greek" hypothesis inadmissible and implies conclusions symmetrically opposed to the latter, such as the fact that the name has spread from north to south.

=== Oscan origin ===
The ultimate etymology of the name is uncertain, in spite of numerous suggestions. According to the most widely accepted explanation, Latin Italia may derive from Oscan víteliú, meaning "[land] of young cattle" (cf. Latin vitulus "calf", Umbrian vitlu), via ancient Greek transmission (evidenced in the loss of initial digamma). The bull was a symbol of the southern Italic tribes and was often depicted goring the Roman wolf as a defiant symbol of free Italy during the Social War. On the coinage of the Social War, dating back to 90 BC, found in the ancient city of Corfinium (in Abruzzo), there is a personification of Italy as a goddess, accompanied by a legend that reproduces her name, ITALIA, in the Latin alphabet, or the equivalent VITELIU (Víteliú = Italy) in the Oscan alphabet. This is the first epigraphic testimony of the use of the name Italia.

=== Semitic origin ===
Another theory, rather contested, suggests that Italy derives from "Atalu", an Akkadian word (Semitic language like Phoenician) reconstructed by the scholar Giovanni Semerano, which would mean "land of sunset".

Itamar Ben-Avi, the son of linguist Eliezer Ben-Yehuda and the first modern native speaker of Hebrew, theorized that Italy derived from Hebrew — "I" ("אִי", "island"), "tal" ("טַל", "dew"), and "yam" ("יָם", "sea") — and that the name was pre-Latin and showed possible links between Etruscan and Hebrew cultures through the Mediterranean Sea. Though this theory did not gain wide traction, it was also adopted by Zionist leader Ze'ev Jabotinsky.

=== Conclusions ===
It can be observed that the notion of Italy is a dynamic and plural notion, in progress until the 3rd century BC. In fact, in the conception of Italy a Greek Italy (limited to the southern Italy), another Etruscan (separated from the Apennines, from the Gallic and ancient Greek world), and probably also a first Roman Italy, which initially coincided with the large western coastal region between northern Etruria and the ager Campanus, and which then absorbed the others.

== Evolution of the territory called "Italy" ==
Regions of Augustan Italy

Italia, the ancient name of the Italian Peninsula, which is also eponymous of the modern republic, originally applied only to the "tip" of the Italian "boot" (in modern Calabria).

According to Antiochus of Syracuse, it included only the southern portion of the Bruttium peninsula: the actual province of Reggio Calabria and part of the modern provinces of Catanzaro and Vibo Valentia. The town of Catanzaro has a road sign (in Italian) also stating this fact. But by this time, Oenotria and Italy had become synonymous and the name also applied to most of Lucania as well. Coins bearing the name Víteliú in Oscan (𐌅𐌝𐌕𐌄𐌋𐌉𐌞) were minted by an alliance of Italic peoples (Sabines, Samnites, Umbrians and others) competing with Rome in the 1st century BC.

The ancient Greeks gradually came to apply the name Italia to a larger region, but it was during the Roman Republic, in 264 BC, that the territory called "Italy" was extended to the Italian Peninsula south of the Arno and Rubicon rivers. The northern area of Cisalpine Gaul came in the Roman sphere of influence in the 220s BC and became considered geographically and de facto part of Italy. The borders of Roman Italy, Italia, are better established. Cato's Origines, the first work of history composed in Latin, described Italy as the entire peninsula south of the Alps. According to Cato and several Roman authors, the Alps formed the "walls of Italy". The north, however, being a province, remained de jure separated from Italy in administrative matters for a longer period of time. It was legally merged into the administrative unit of Italy in 42 BC by the triumvir Augustus, as planned by Julius Caesar, who had already extended Roman citizenship to all of Cisalpine Gaul in 49 BC. The term "Italy" also included Liguria up to the Varo river and Istria up to Pola and to the Arsa river. All its inhabitants were considered Italic and Roman.

Under Emperor Diocletian the administrative Roman region of "Italia" was further enlarged with the addition in 292 AD of the three big islands of the western Mediterranean Sea: Sicily (with the Maltese archipelago), Sardinia and Corsica, coinciding with the whole Italian geographical region.

Indeed, under Diocletian Italy became the 'Dioecesis Italiciana. It also included southern Raetia (actual Switzerland and parts of Austria). It was subdivided into the following provinces:

- Liguria (today's Liguria and western Piedmont)
- Transpadana (eastern Piedmont and Lombardy)
- Rhaetia (eastern Switzerland, western and central Austria and part of northeastern Italy)
- Venetia et Histria (today's Veneto, Friuli-Venezia Giulia and Trentino-Alto Adige and Istria)
- Aemilia (Emilia-Romagna)
- Tuscia (Etruria) et Umbria (Tuscany and Umbria)
- Flaminia (Picenum and the former Ager Gallicus, in today's Marche)
- Latium et Campania (the coastal parts of Lazio and Campania)
- Samnium (Abruzzo, Molise and Irpinia)
- Apulia et Calabria (today's Apulia)
- Lucania et Bruttium (Basilicata and Calabria)
- Sicilia (Sicily and Malta)
- Corsica et Sardinia

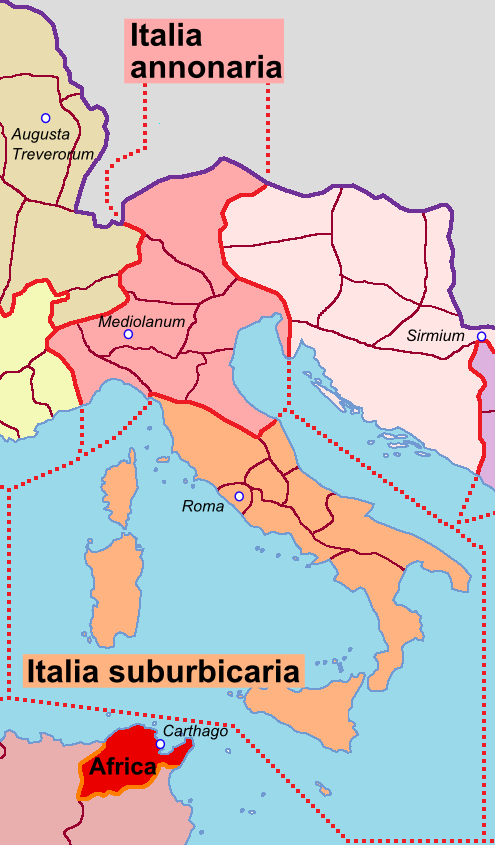
Italia annonaria and Italia suburbicaria under Constantine the Great

Constantine subdivided the Empire into four praetorian prefectures. The Diocesis Italiciana became the Praetorian prefecture of Italy (praefectura praetoria Italiae), and was subdivided into two dioceses. It still included Raetia. The two dioceses and their provinces were:

- Diocesis Italia annonaria (Italy of the annona - its inhabitants had the obligation to provide the court, the administration and the troops, first allocated in Milan and then in Ravenna, supplies, wine and timber)
  - Alpes Cottiae (modern Liguria and western part of Piedmont)
  - Liguria (western Lombardy and eastern part of Piedmont)
  - Venetia et Histria (Istria [which is now part of Croatia, Slovenia and Italy], Friuli-Venezia Giulia, Trentino-Alto Adige, Veneto and eastern and central Lombardy)
  - Raetia I (eastern Switzerland and western Austria)
  - Rhaetia II (central Austria, part of southern Germany, and part of northeastern Italy)
  - Aemilia (the Emilia part of Emilia-Romagna)
  - Flaminia et Picenum Annonarium (Romagna and northern Marche)
- Diocesis Italia suburbicaria (Italy "under the government of the urbs", i.e. Rome)
  - Tuscia (Etruria) et Umbria (Tuscany, Umbria and the northern part of coastal Lazio)
  - Picenum suburbicarium (Piceno, in southern Marche)
  - Valeria Sabina (the modern province of Rieti, other areas of Lazio and areas of Umbria and Abruzzo)
  - Campania (central and southern coastal Lazio and coastal Campania except for the modern province of Salerno)
  - Samnium (Abruzzo, Molise and the mountain areas of modern Campania; i.e., the modern provinces of Benevento and Avellino and part of the province of Caserta)
  - Apulia et Calabria (today's Apulia)
  - Lucania et Bruttium (modern Calabria, Basilicata and the province of Salerno in modern Campania)
  - Sicilia (Sicily and Malta)
  - Sardinia
  - Corsica

The Latin term Italicus was used to describe "a man of Italy" as opposed to a provincial. For example, Pliny the Elder notably wrote in a letter Italicus es an provincialis? meaning "are you an Italian or a provincial?". The adjective italianus, from which are derived the Italian (and also French and English) name of the Italians, is medieval and was used alternatively with Italicus during the early modern period.

After the fall of the Western Roman Empire, which was caused by the invasion of the Ostrogoths, the Kingdom of Italy was created. After the Lombard invasions, "Italia" was retained as the name for their kingdom, and for its successor kingdom within the Holy Roman Empire, which nominally lasted until 1806, although it had de facto disintegrated due to factional politics pitting the empire against the ascendant city republics in the 13th century.

== See also ==
- History of Italy
