= Vassallaggi =

Sicilian prehistoric Bronze Age archaeological site

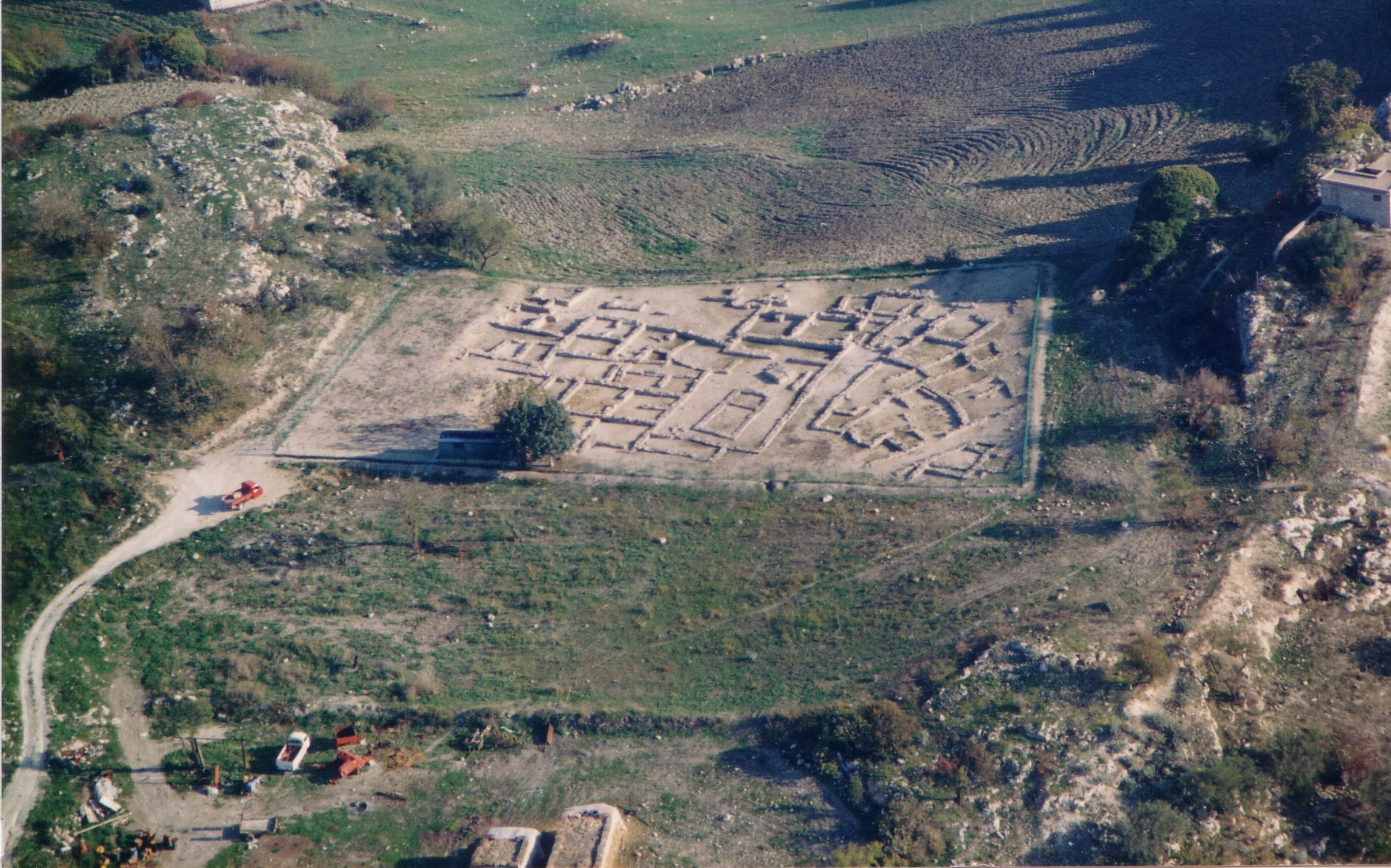
- image of Vassallaggi from the air.

- Location within Sicily
- 37°28′14″N 13°56′51″E
- Periods: Bronze Age, Archaic-Roman Sicily
- Location: San Cataldo, province of Caltanissetta, Sicily, Italy

Site notes
- Elevation: 704 m (2,310 ft)

Vassallaggi is a Sicilian prehistoric Bronze Age archaeological site, located on the hill of the same name, which had a later flourishing after the 7th century BC as a phrourion (fortress). The site is located in the middle of the Salso river valley, at 704 m above sea level, near San Cataldo in the province of Caltanissetta, in a strategic location for communication between the southern coast of Sicily and the northern part of the island. It has a NE-SW orientation and stretches along in parallel with the SS 122 San Cataldo-Serradifalco.

This archaeological site developed over time on five small hills in close proximity to one another. It represents an important example of a Greek settlement in central Sicily, having apparently taken on increasing amounts of Greek cultural forms as a result of Greek people arriving from Rhodes and Crete, via Akragas. The site's position is critical for controlling the central Salso river valley.

The site, known already in the 19th century, only became the subject of excavation from 1905. These excavations continued until the 1960s and produced brilliant results, including the discovery of considerable evidence for human habitation from the Bronze Age until the first centuries CE. Remains of walls, houses, streets, tombs and religious sites provide evidence of a prosperous community. Numerous items, some perfectly preserved, are now on display in various museums throughout Sicily.

== History ==
The site first developed in the Bronze Age (18th-14th centuries BC), from which time some cave tombs of the Castelluccio culture survive and a circular hut with furniture, located on the hill looking towards San Cataldo. This original site was heavily altered by later periods of settlement.

The most ancient inhabitants of Vassallaggi, were presumably the Sicans of the early Bronze Age, whose presence is indicated by red-painted pottery with geometric motifs from the 2nd millennium tombs; kilns typical of that group were found nearby.

No finds have come to light from the middle and late Bronze Age, so these hills may have been abandoned at that time; this might be a result of emigration towards the coast from the middle Bronze Age and then as a result of the preference for more defensible sites in face of the arrival of the Sicels (which might have taken the form of an invasion). Thus the site was unoccupied for about 700 years, before a Sican settlement developed here in the 8th century BC.

This new habitation during the Iron Age continued until Greek occupation of the site in the 5th century, when the village seems to have been fortified and to have developed within the sphere of Akragas.

After the foundation of that city by Gela (most powerful of the Dorian colonies founded in the 7th century BC), a period of expansion of Greek origin people began which led to the colonisation of central Sicily, using the natural route along the Himera river valley (the modern Salso). The expansion into inland Sicily may be explained by the demographic pressure on the Greek communities of the motherland and the other Greek colonies. The need to augment agricultural production and open new markets for manufactured goods may also have been a causal factor.

The site of Vassallaggi, however, based on archaeological evidence, was only conquered and colonised by Greeks from Akragas in the 6th century BC, unlike nearby sites, like Sabucina, Capodarso and Gibil Gabib which were colonised by Gela, as shown by the proto-Corinthian style pottery found there, which is never found at Vassallaggi.

The most important discoveries in the rich necropolis, both in terms of quantity and quality of items recovered, derive from this period. They include ceramic sarcophagi, one of which is perfectly preserved, locally made vases, pottery from other Greek areas, bronze knives, spears and strigils, as well as coins. A temple for the worship of a female deity was built at this time.

The absence of concrete evidence (e.g. inscriptions, money coined on site) makes it difficult to attribute any known ancient place name to the location. It has been suggested that the site is Motyon, the first fortified centre in the Acragantine area. The city was inexplicably abandoned around 320 BC. There are no traces of objects after this date.

From the Roman period, traces of small nucleated settlements are found in the valley and the surrounding territory, including especially important routes to Akragas. Christian tombs, dating to the 5th century AD have been found, near the prehistoric caves.

== See also ==
- Polizzello archaeological site
- Castelluccio Culture
- Thapsos Culture
- Sicans

== Bibliography ==
- Elisa Lissi Caronna (1974). La necropoli meridionale. Accademia Nazionale dei Lincei.
- Rosalba Panvini (2005). Le ceramiche attiche figurate del Museo Archeologico di Caltanissetta. Edipuglia. ISBN 978-88-7228-385-1.
- Calogero Miccichè (1989). Mesogheia: archeologia e storia della Sicilia centro-meridionale dal VII al IV secolo a.C. Sciascia.
- Simona Fortunelli; Concetta Masseria (2009). Ceramica attica da santuari della Grecia, della Ionia e dell'Italia: atti convegno internazionale, Perugia 14-17 marzo 2007. Osanna. ISBN 9788881672622.
- Nunzio Allegro (1976). Himera, II: campagne di scavo 1966-1973. L'Erma di Bretschneider.
- Marina Castoldi (1998). Le antefisse dipinte di Gela. Comune di Milano.
- Luigi Todisco (2003). La ceramica figurata a soggetto tragico in Magna Grecia e in Sicilia. G. Bretschneider. ISBN 978-88-7689-195-3.
- Rosa Maria Bonacasa Carra; Fabiola Ardizzone (1995). Agrigento: la necropoli paleocristiana sub divo. L'ERMA di BRETSCHNEIDER. pp. 45–. ISBN 978-88-7062-883-8.
- Robert Ross Holloway, The Archaeology of Ancient Sicily. P Routledge, London. 2000 ISBN 0-415-23791-2
- A. G. Woodhead, The Greeks in the West. Praege New York. 1992 ISBN
- Brian Benjamin Shefton; Kathryn Lomas (2004). Greek Identity in the Western Mediterranean: Papers in Honour of Brian Shefton. BRILL. ISBN 90-04-13300-3.
- Lela Manning Urquhart (2010). Colonial Religion and Indigenous Society in the Archaic Western Mediterranean, C. 750-400 BCE. Stanford University. pp. 161–. STANFORD:FV818DT6086.
- Barbara Heldring (1981). Sicilian Plastic Vases. B.H.M. Heldring.
- Gerald Verbrugghe (1976). Sicilia. Kümmerly + Frey.
- Ernst Langlotz (1963). Die Kunst der Westgriechen in Sizilien und Unteritalien. Hirmer.
- Marcus Heinrich Hermanns (2004). Licht und Lampen im westgriechischen Alltag: Beleuchtungsgerät des 6.-3. Jhs. V. Chr. In Selinunt (in German). Leidorf. ISBN 978-3-89646-359-3.
- Adolfo J. Domínguez (1989). La colonización griega en Sicilia (in Spanish). B.A.R.
