= Battle of the Himera River (446 BC) =

Battle between Syracuse and Acragas

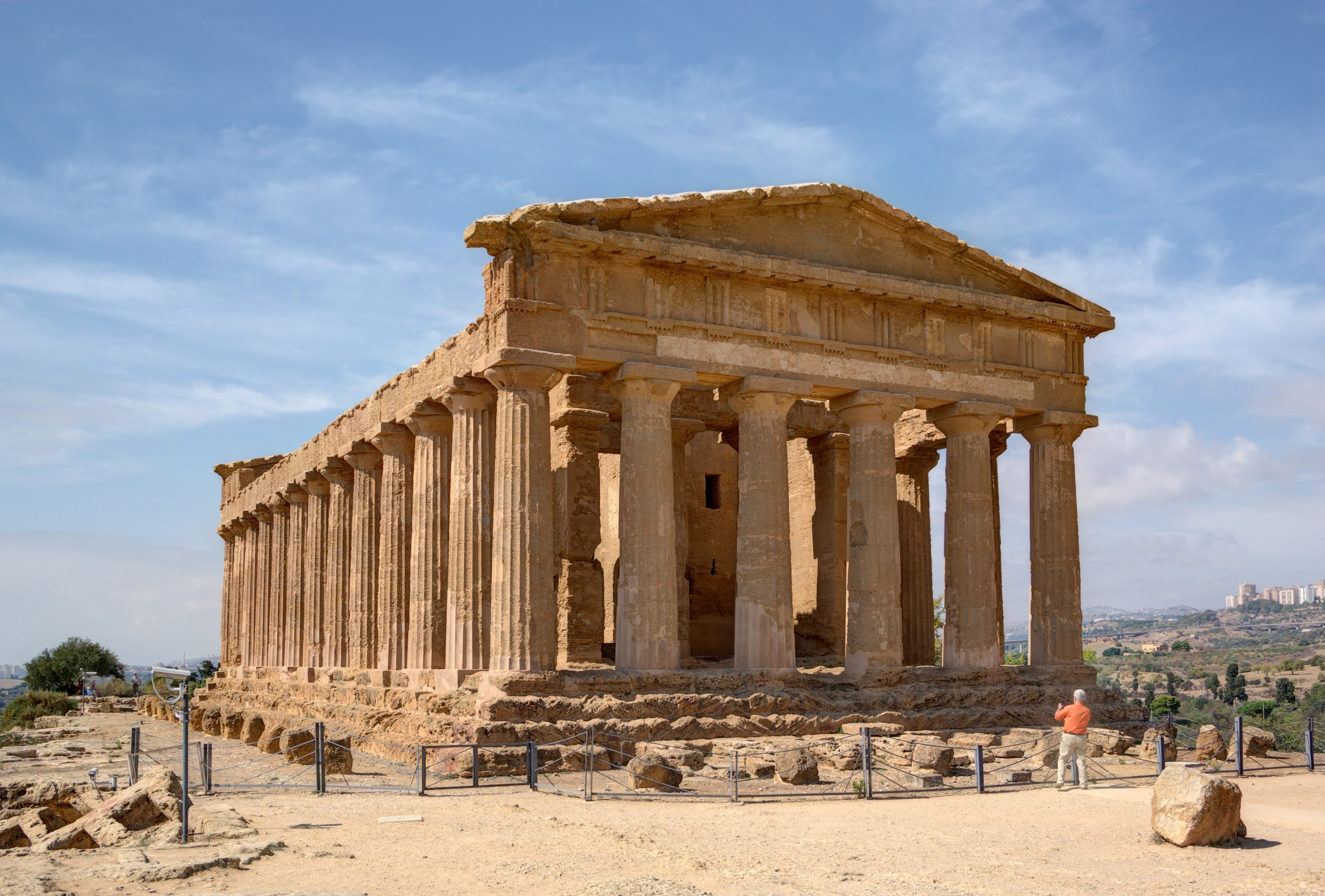
- Battle of the Himera River (446 BC)
Date	446 BC
Location	The Himera River, either the modern Salso or the Grande, on Sicily, Italy
Result	Decisive Syracusan victory; peace treaty

Belligerents
Syracuse	Acragas

Casualties and losses
Unknown	Over 1,000

The Battle of the Himera River was fought in 446 BC between Syracuse and Acragas near the Himera river. The latter had declared war on Syracuse because their common enemy, the Sicel leader Ducetius, had returned to Sicily to colonize Cale Acte. Syracuse had exiled rather than executed Ducetius in 450 BC. Syracuse defeated Acragas and the conflict was settled with a peace treaty.

In classical antiquity the name Himera was used for two rivers on Sicily: the Grande and the Salso. The Grande flows north towards its mouth at the site of ancient Himera, the Salso follows a southern course to its mouth in modern Licata. It is not certain near which river the battle took place.

== Background ==
In 450 BC Ducetius was decisively defeated by Syracuse in the Battle of Nomae and by Acragas at Motyum. Fearing that he would be slain by his own people, he fled to Syracuse in a desperate attempt to save himself. At night he entered the city's marketplace and seated himself at the altars of the gods to become a suppliant who was entitled to sanctuary. The Syracusans were amazed and magistrates called a meeting of the Assembly to determine how he should be dealt with. Some proposed to punish him, but the elder citizens convinced the Assembly that it would be a sacrilege to execute a suppliant. The Syracusans exiled Ducetius to Corinth and provided him with sufficient financial resources to support himself.

After spending some time in Corinth Ducetius broke the agreement and sailed back to Sicily with colonists to found Cale Acte. This angered the Acragantines, who were envious of Syracusans and accused them of releasing their common enemy without having consulted them first. They declared war on Syracuse.

== Battle and aftermath ==
The other Greek cities of Sicily were divided, some joined Acragas and some joined Syracuse. The two forces met near the Himera River where Syracuse won the battle. Over a thousand Acragantines were killed in the fighting. After the battle Acragas sent ambassadors to Syracuse to discuss terms for a peace treaty which ended the war. The terms of the treaty are unknown.

The battle may have taken place on the southern Himera River, the modern Salso. Syracuse probably had a superiority in cavalry, which made Acragas pick a battle site close to a river to negate this advantage of their enemy somewhat. Nevertheless, its superior cavalry most likely enabled Syracuse to win the battle. The number of Syracusan casualties would have been minor.

== Sources ==
- Diodorus Siculus (1946). Oldfather, C. H. (ed.). Library of History. Vol. 6. Cambridge, Massachusetts: Harvard University Press. ISBN 978-0-674-99439-3.
