= Morgetes =

The Morgetes (Ancient Greek: Μόργητες, Latin: Morgetes) were an ancient oenotrian tribe, of Pelasgian descent, who occupied the region of southern Italy from Calabria to Sicily.

== History ==
The Morgetes were part of the Italic peoples, which occupied both the Ionian and Tyrrhenian shores of Calabria. According to some ancient historians, they were one of the branches of the Oenotrians, along with the Chones, the Itali and the Sicels. Others hold that they inhabited Italy before the Oenotrians and were driven out by them, fleeing to Sicily. Yet others identify them with the group of the Italoi who accepted the rule of the mythical king Morges after the death of his father Italus. A final definition claimed that they were the Sicels who moved into Sicily under the leadership of King Morges. In this version, Morges was the brother of Italus and son of Siculus, who was also the founder of Rome.

In Calabria, they were said to inhabit the inland regions according to the works of Proclus, Pliny the Elder, Strabo, which describe the Morgetes and King Morges. Morges was reputed to have founded the site of San Giorgio Morgeto, which was fortified as a castle in the 9th and 10th century AD.

In Sicily, the Morgetes were also meant to have settled in the interior, driving away the Sicans and establishing the city of Morgantina and other communities in the 10th century BC.

== Bibliography ==
- Girolamo Marafioti, Croniche et antichità di Calabria. Conforme all'ordine de' testi greco, & latino, raccolte da' più famosi scrittori antichi, & moderni ..., Padova, Ad instanza de gl'Uniti, 1601. Ristampa anastatica: editore Arnaldo Forni, 1975 e 1981. Consultabile on line in Google Libri.
- Ettore M. De Juliis (1996). Magna Grecia: l'Italia meridionale dalle origini leggendarie alla conquista romana. Santo Spirito (Bari): Edipuglia. ISBN 88-7228-158-X.
- Pasquale Scaglione (1808-1880), Storie di Locri e Gerace.
- Nicolino Amendolia, La notte Morgezia (pubblicato a Napoli nel 1842).
- Domenico Valensise Monografia di Polistena (1863).
- Domenico Cangemi, Monografia di San Giorgio Morgeto (1886).
- Marcello Amendolea, "San Giorgio Morgeto", in Calabria Letteraria, luglio-agosto-settembre 1961 (anno IX n. 7-8-9), pp. 27–28.
- Sebastiano Tusa (1999). La Sicilia nella preistoria. Palermo: Sellerio. ISBN 88-389-1440-0.
- Antonio Floccari, Storia di Cinquefrondi.
