= Polizzello archaeological site =

Polizzello
- Interactive map of Polizzello
- Periods: Bronze Age
- Cultures: Sicani, Sicels
- Location: Mussomeli, Province of Caltanissetta, Sicily, Italy
- Region: Sicily

Site notes
- Length: 877
- Excavation dates: late 19th century
- Archaeologists: Dario Palermo

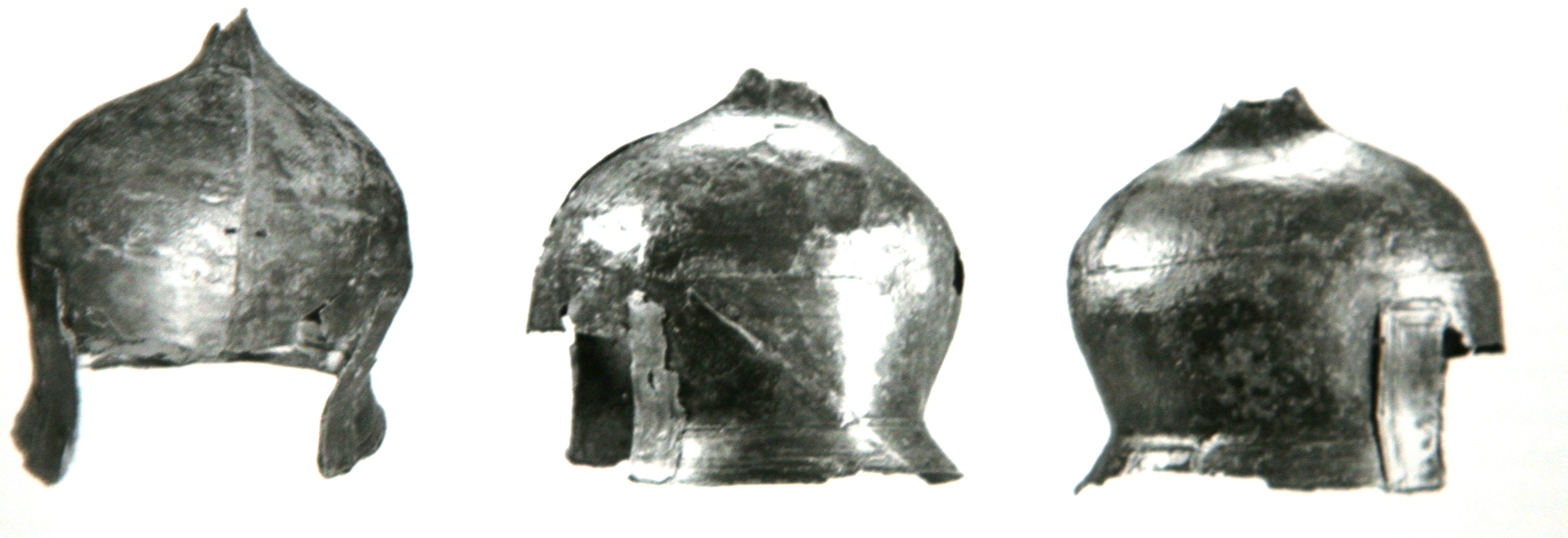
Three views of Polizzello helmet

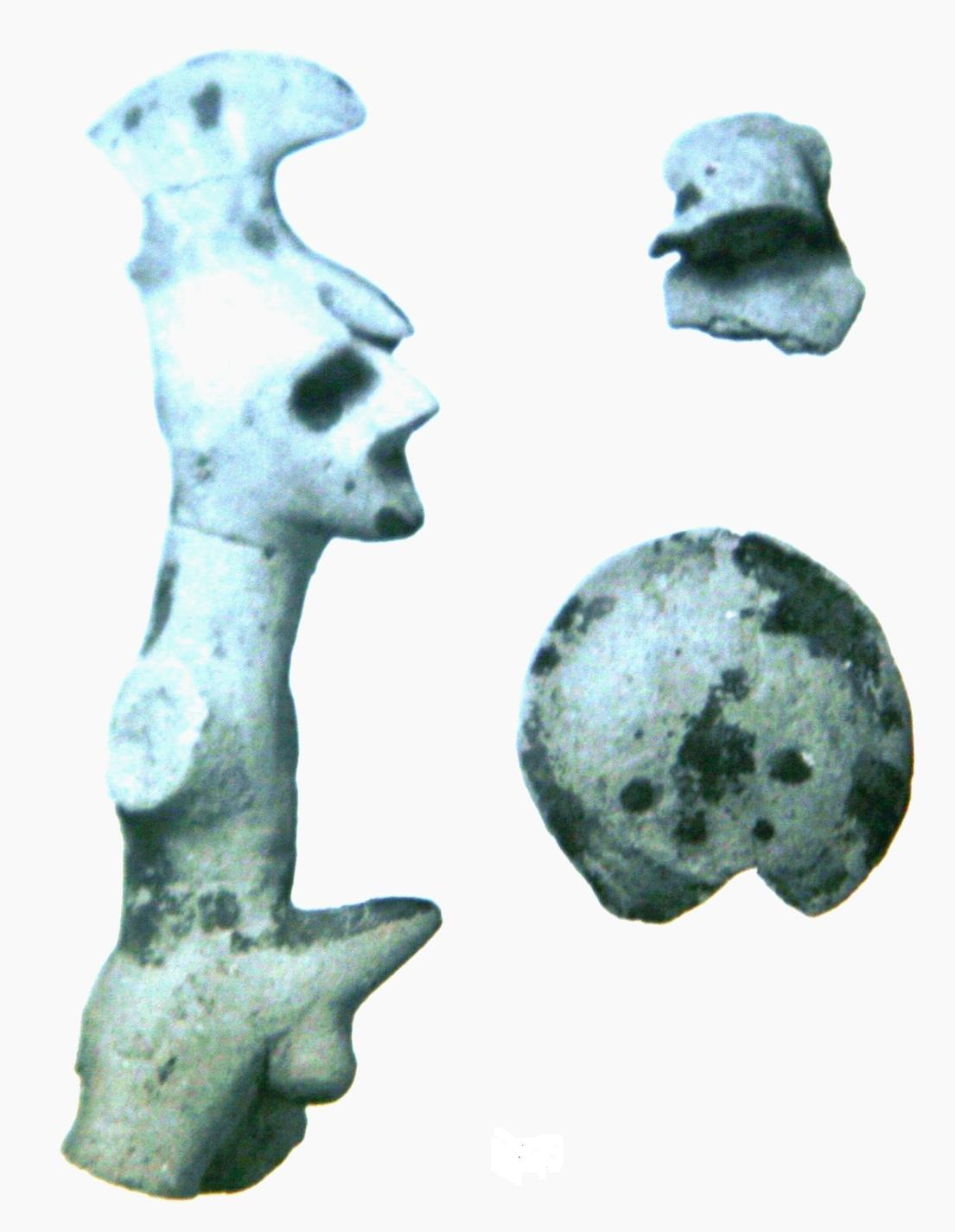
Clay figurine of ithyphallic warrior

The archaeological site of Polizzello or mountain of Polizzello was a site inhabited probably from the eleventh to the sixth century BC

The name apparently derives from the tyrant Polyzelus. According to another thesis the name derives from the Greek πολις Ειθηλος (Polizzello), although so far there is no archaeological evidence that may indicate the presence of a Greek settlement in the area.

The site is located on a hill at 877 m above sea level and is near Mussomeli in the Province of Caltanissetta.

The site is great for a human settlement for its easily defensible position and for the presence of water sources. It consists of two plateaus of which the upper smallest one is home of Acropolis and place of the first protohistoric and archaic settlement, moreover; the site has an east–west orientation with a single access from east.

Historically, the site had three significant phases:

1. Early Bronze Age (19th–16th centuries BC), of which remain some chamber tombs of Castelluccio period and a circular hut with ornaments placed on the eastern side of the mountain.
2. 11th–9th centuries BC with the creation of an Acropolis placed on top of the hill.
3. 8th–6th centuries BC, period of maximum development of the center, of which remains a monumental fence that runs along the edge of the terrace on the hill and a series of circular buildings: Sacelli, places of worship. Inside which exceptional historical artifacts have been found including the Polizzello helmet of Cretan workmanship and a clay figurine of ithyphallic warrior (The Warrior of Polizzello).

Of the fifth century BC are the remains of the House of Temenos. This is a residential building with multiple rooms.

== See also ==
- Castelluccio Culture
- Monte Grande (Palma di Montechiaro)
- Vassallaggi
- Castelluccio di Noto
