= Battle of Himera =

Battle of Himera may refer to the following battles fought in Sicily:

- Battle of Himera (480 BC), fought near the city Himera
- Battle of the Himera River (446 BC), fought near either of the two rivers called Himera on Sicily
- Battle of Himera (409 BC), resulting in the destruction of the city Himera
- Battle of the Himera River (311 BC), fought near the Himera River, close to modern Licata
