= Humaira =

Humaira (حُمَيراء) is a Muslim female name of Arabic origin. The name is derived from the root word ḥumrāʾ (حُمْرَاء), meaning “reddish” or “rosy-cheeked.” Notable people with the name include:

- Humaira Abid, Pakistani artist
- Humaira Ali (1960–2025), Pakistani actress
- Humaira Bachal (born 1988), Pakistani activist
- Humaira Begum (1918–2002), Afghan royal
- Humaira Channa (born 1966), Pakistani playback singer
- Humaira Himu (1985–2023), Bangladeshi actress
- Humaira Khatoon, Pakistani politician

== See also ==
- Humera (disambiguation)
- Humira, brand name of the medication adalimumab
- Himera (disambiguation)
