= Battle of the Himera River =

Battle of the Himera River may refer to:

- Battle of the Himera River (311 BC)
- Battle of the Himera River (446 BC)
