= Himera (disambiguation) =

Himera may refer to:

- Himera, an ancient Greek city of Sicily
  - Battle of Himera (480 BC), the 480 BC battle at the site
  - Battle of Himera (409 BC), the 409 BC (Second) battle at the site
  - Battle of the Himera River (311 BC), the 311 BC battle at the mouth of the river Salso
- The ancient name of the river Imera Settentrionale Sicily
- The ancient name of the river Salso of Sicily
- Himera (album), an album by Aria

== See also ==
- Humera (disambiguation)
