= Palike =

Ancient Sicilian city

- Παλικὴ (in Ancient Greek); Palikè (in Italian)
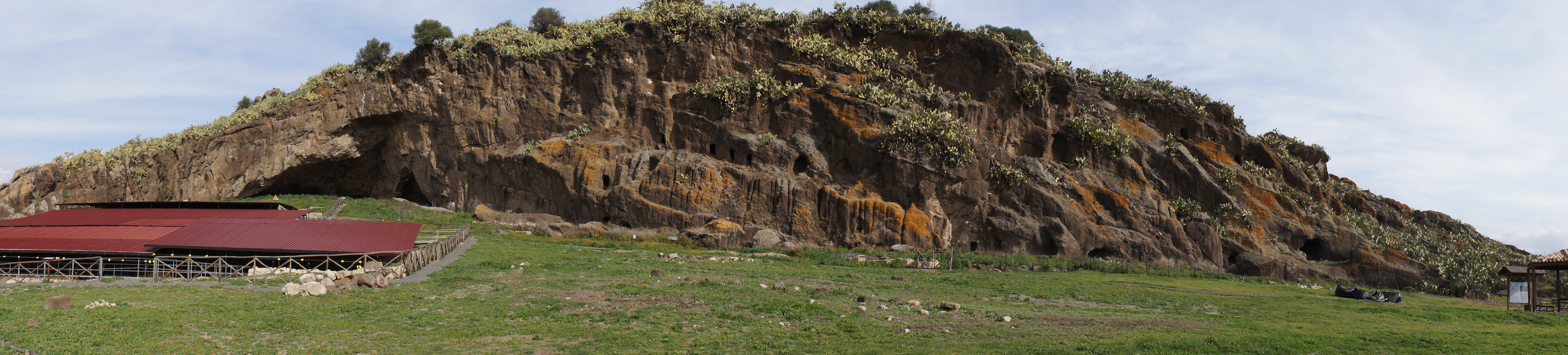

- Location within Italy
- 37°19′46″N 14°41′53″E
- Type: Settlement
- Periods: Classical Greek
- Cultures: Sicel
- Location: Rocchicella, Province of Catania, Sicily, Italy

History
- Built: 453 BCE
- Built by: Ducetius
- Abandoned: 440 BCE

Site notes
- Condition: Ruined
- Owner: Public
- Management: Soprintendenza BB.CC.AA. di Catania
- Public access: Yes
- Website: Antiquarium of Palikè at Rocchicella

Palike (Ancient Greek: Παλική; Italian: Palikè) was an ancient city on Sicily. Its archeological site is located in Rocchicella on a spur of basalt in the valley of the Margi river. It lies at a distance of two kilometers to the west of the comune of Palagonia, but is part of the comune of Mineo, both in the province of Catania. The Sicilian Region has recently acquired the area and opened it to the public. An exhibition was created to show the materials found there during excavations.

== History ==
There are no certain origins to this ancient town. Diodorus Siculus writes that it was founded in 453 BCE by the native Sikel leader Ducetius. It was named after the sanctuary of the Palici nearby. The city was surrounded by strong walls and grew rapidly because of the fertility of its soil. However, it was soon destroyed and the site remained uninhabited at the time Diodorus wrote the Bibliotheca historica, which he finished in approximately 60 BCE.

Palike's destruction most likely happened in 440 BCE, when the city of Trinakie was destroyed by Syracuse according to Diodorus Siculus. Ducetius had died of an illness earlier in the same year. Peter Green and several other historians argue that Trinakie was most likely the same city as Palike. The table of contents of the Bibliotheca historica refers to the Syracusan campaign as being conducted "against the Picenians", which makes no sense. If the spelling of the Ancient Greek text is slightly altered, this would read "against the men of Palici". Trinakie is an ancient indigenous name for Sicily, which would have been a suitable name for the nationalistic ambitions of the Sicels. The city might have been renamed to Trinakie or it could have been the name of its acropolis.
