= Gibil Gabib =

Archaeological site in Sicily

- Location within Sicily
- 37°27′10.21″N 14°4′41.71″E
- Periods: Bronze Age, 7th-6th centuries
- Cultures: Castelluccio culture, Sicels, later with Greek influence
- Location: Caltanissetta, Sicily, Italy

Site notes
- Excavation dates: middle of the 19th century, 1950s and 1980s
- Archaeologists: Dinu Adameșteanu

Gibil Gabib (also referred to as Gibil Habib) is an archaeological site located about 5 km south of Caltanissetta, on a 615-metre-high (2,018 ft) mountain on the island of Sicily.

Excavations were first undertaken in the area in the middle of the 19th century and were reprised with great enthusiasm in the 1950s by the archaeologist Dinu Adameșteanu. They came to an end in 1984. In those undertaken in the middle of the 20th century, remains dating to the 6th century BC were brought to light, including parts of the city walls and some ceramic objects of the Bronze Age Castelluccio culture, while the 1980s excavations revealed a defensive tower from the middle of the 6th century BC. These discoveries were of great significance, because they helped to clarify the course of the city wall discovered almost thirty years earlier.

Objects discovered in the excavations include vases, objects for everyday use, plates and lamps, as well as a terracotta statue of a female divinity and the terracotta head, which demonstrate the existence of various spaces dedicated to religious cult. At the base of the mountain there is a necropolis, where Siceliote red-figure pottery was found.

The key characteristics of the site are:

- Traces of settlement in the prehistoric period
- Traces of indigenous settlement in the 7th century BC. Subsequently, these inhabited areas show Greek influence and in the next century, a fortification system was built which enclosed a sacred building from the early 6th century BC.
- Two necropoleis located at the base of the mountain, where Siceliote red-figure pottery was found.
- Objects for everyday use found in the inhabited area, and evidence for the existence of a religious cult indicated by a statue of a female deity.

== Gallery ==
Images of objects from Gibil Gabib:

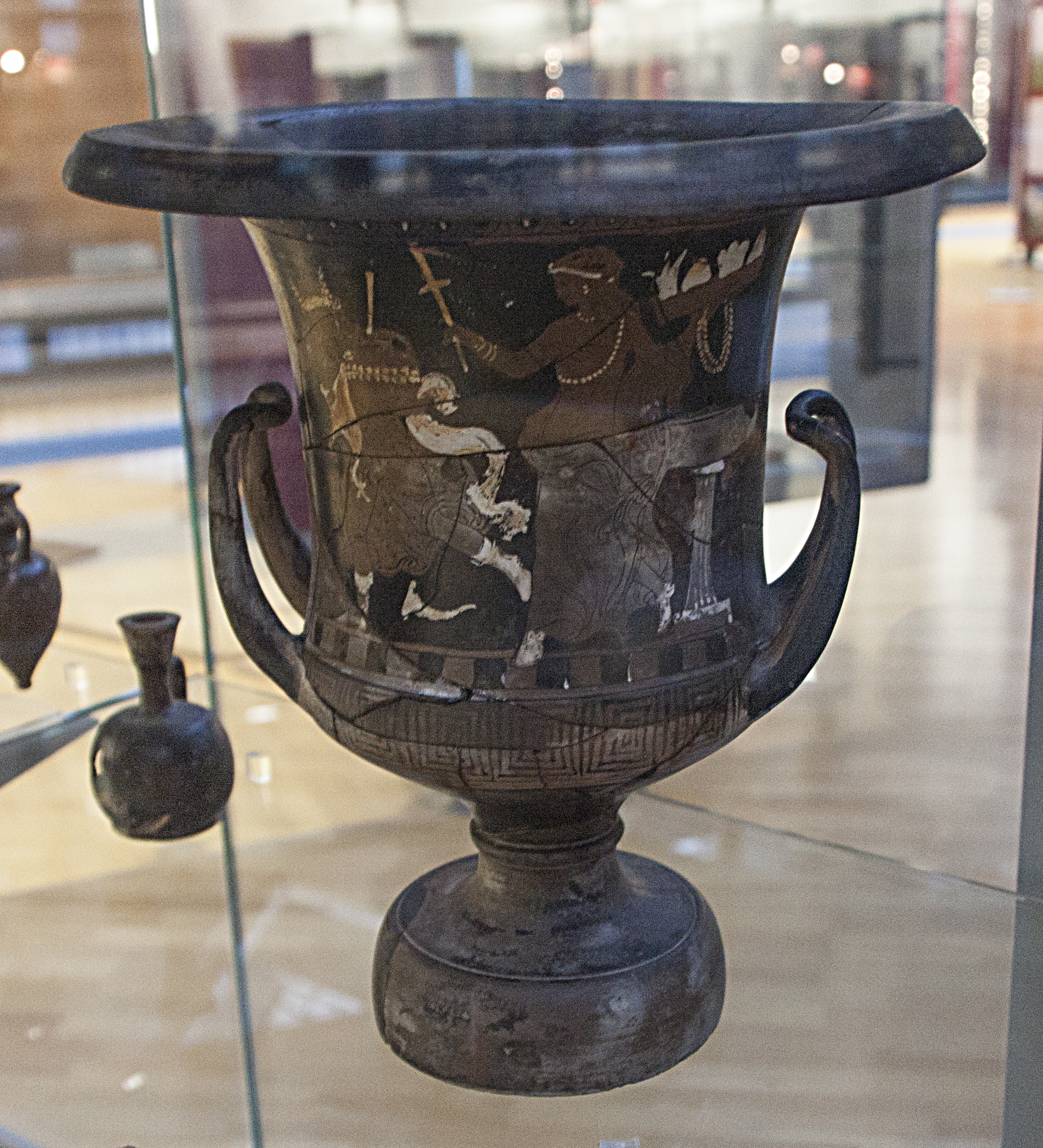
Red-figure krater

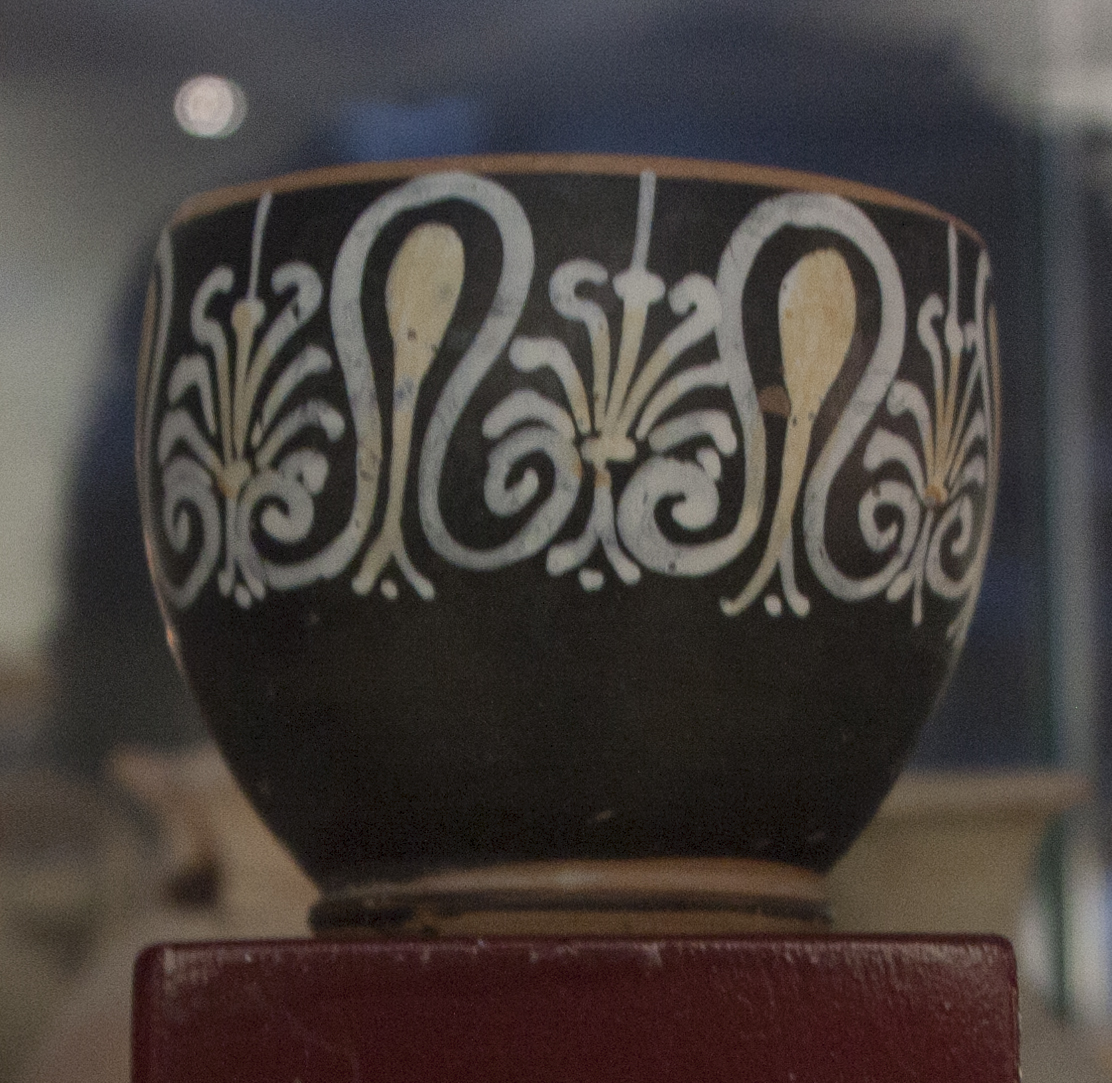
Pyxis

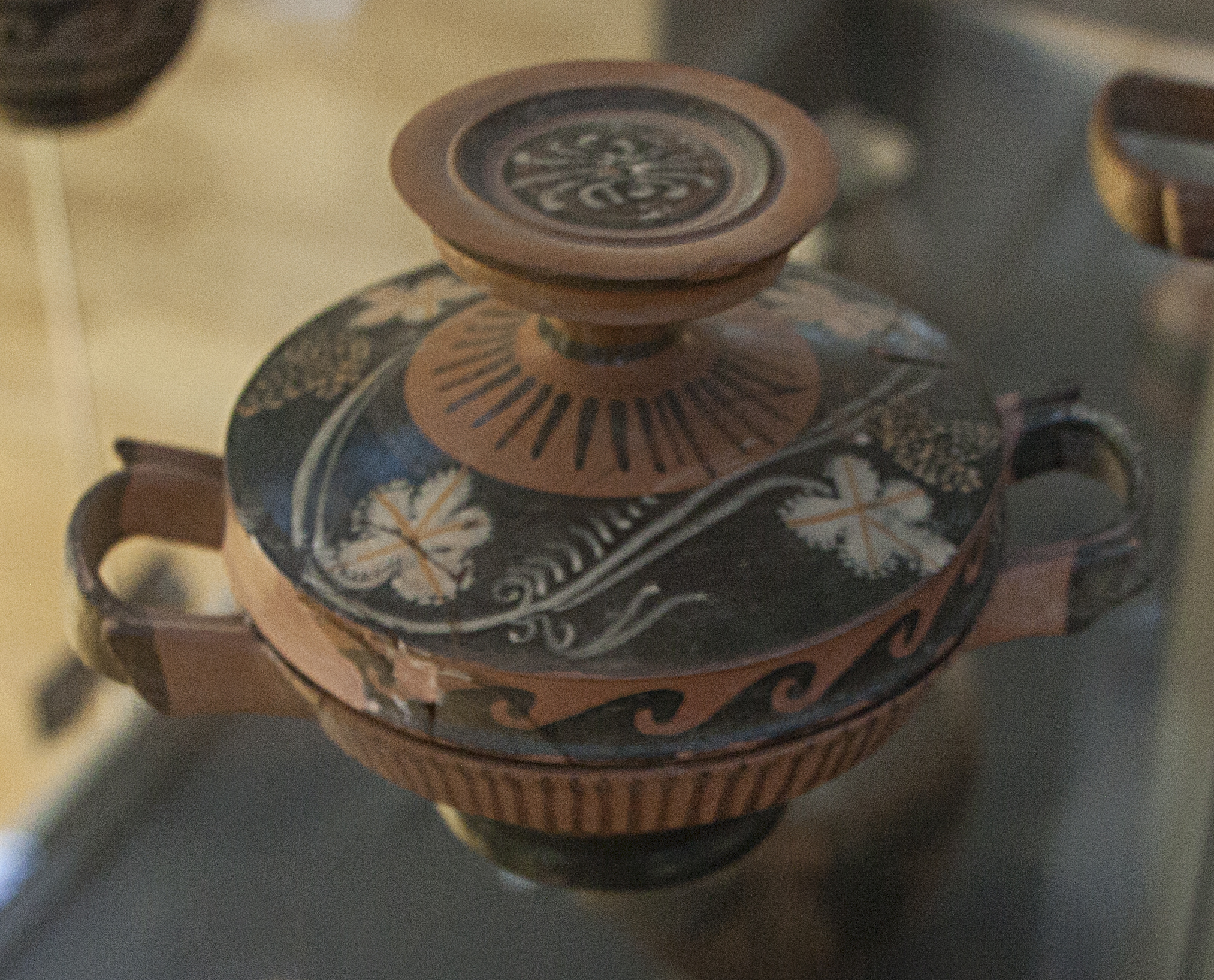
Black-figure lekythos

== See also ==
- History of Caltanissetta

== Bibliography ==
- N. G. Brancato, Recenti rinvenimenti di insediamenti umani dal IV millennio a. C. all'epoca romana nel centro-Sicilia, pp. 32–41
