= Battle of Nomae =

Sicilian battle fought in 450 BC

Date	450 BC
Location	Nomae
Result	Greek victory

Belligerents
Sicels	Syracuse

Commanders and leaders
Ducetius	Unknown

Strength
Unknown	4,500–5,500

Casualties and losses
Unknown	Unknown

The Battle of Nomae was fought in 450 BCE between a united Sicel army under the command of Ducetius and a Greek army of Syracuse. Ducetius was defeated and his Sicel state broke up soon after.

== Background ==
The Sicels were one of the original inhabitants of Sicily but their territory was slowly shrinking due to the expansion of the Greek colonies on the island, mainly Syracuse and Akragas. However, in the 450s BCE they had grown in power under a leader named Ducetius, who had united the Sicel territory under his rule. He was originally an ally of Syracuse, helping them in a war against Catana. However, as he grew in power, and also began to expand into Greek territory, Syracuse became concerned. When Ducetius attacked the other major Sicilian Greek power Akragas, the city asked Syracuse for help and Syracuse agreed.

Fielding 6,000 men along with 900 cavalry, the united Greek force commanded by Bolcon of Syracuse advanced towards Ducetius's army, which was besieging the stronghold Motyon (Motya) and met him in battle there. Recognising that he was at a numerical disadvantage, Ducetius launched a surprise attack against the Greeks at dawn and completely routed them, allowing his army to capture Motyon. Bolcon was accused of colluding with Ducetius and was subsequently executed.

== Battle ==
The Greeks regrouped over winter and launched a second assault in the spring of 450. Akragas moved to retake Motyon while Syracuse, who were probably fielding their full remaining army of around 4,500 to 5,500 troops, moved to engage Ducetius. The forces met at Nomae and the Greeks gained a victory this time.

== Aftermath ==
After the battle Ducetius was deserted by his troops and his kingdom broke apart. He surrendered himself to Syracuse, who allowed him to go into exile in Corinth. The Sicels would never pose a major threat to the Greeks in Sicily again. Syracuse and Akragas would not remain allies for long and soon began disputing control over Sicily. Ducetius would return in 446 BCE and founded the city of Kale Akte, which annoyed Akragas who used it as an excuse to go to war with Syracuse for not executing Ducetius. This would result in the Battle of the Himera River (446 BC) in which Syracuse won, becoming the dominant power in Sicily until the Second Sicilian War against Carthage.
