= Humera (disambiguation) =

Humera is a city in the Kafta Humera woreda in the Tigray Region of Ethiopia.

Humera may also refer to:

== Female first name ==
- Humera Arshad, Pakistani pop singer
- Humera Channa, Pakistani playback singer
- Humera Masroor (born 1967), Pakistani cricketer

== Other uses ==
- Humera Airport, an Ethiopian airport for the city of Humera

== See also ==
- Himera (disambiguation)
- Humaira (disambiguation)
- Humira, brand name of the medication adalimumab
