= Motyon =

Motyon or Motyum (Greek: Μότυον), was a small town or fortress of Sicily, in the territory of Agrigentum (modern Agrigento). It was besieged in 451 BCE by the Siculian chief Ducetius, and fell into his hands after a battle in which he defeated the Agrigentines and their allies; but was recovered by the Agrigentines in the course of the following summer. (Diod. xi. 91.) Its supposed site is the large archaeological site of Vassallaggi in the comune of San Cataldo in the Province of Caltanissetta.
