= San Cataldo, Sicily =

San Cataldo
- Comune
- Comune di San Cataldo
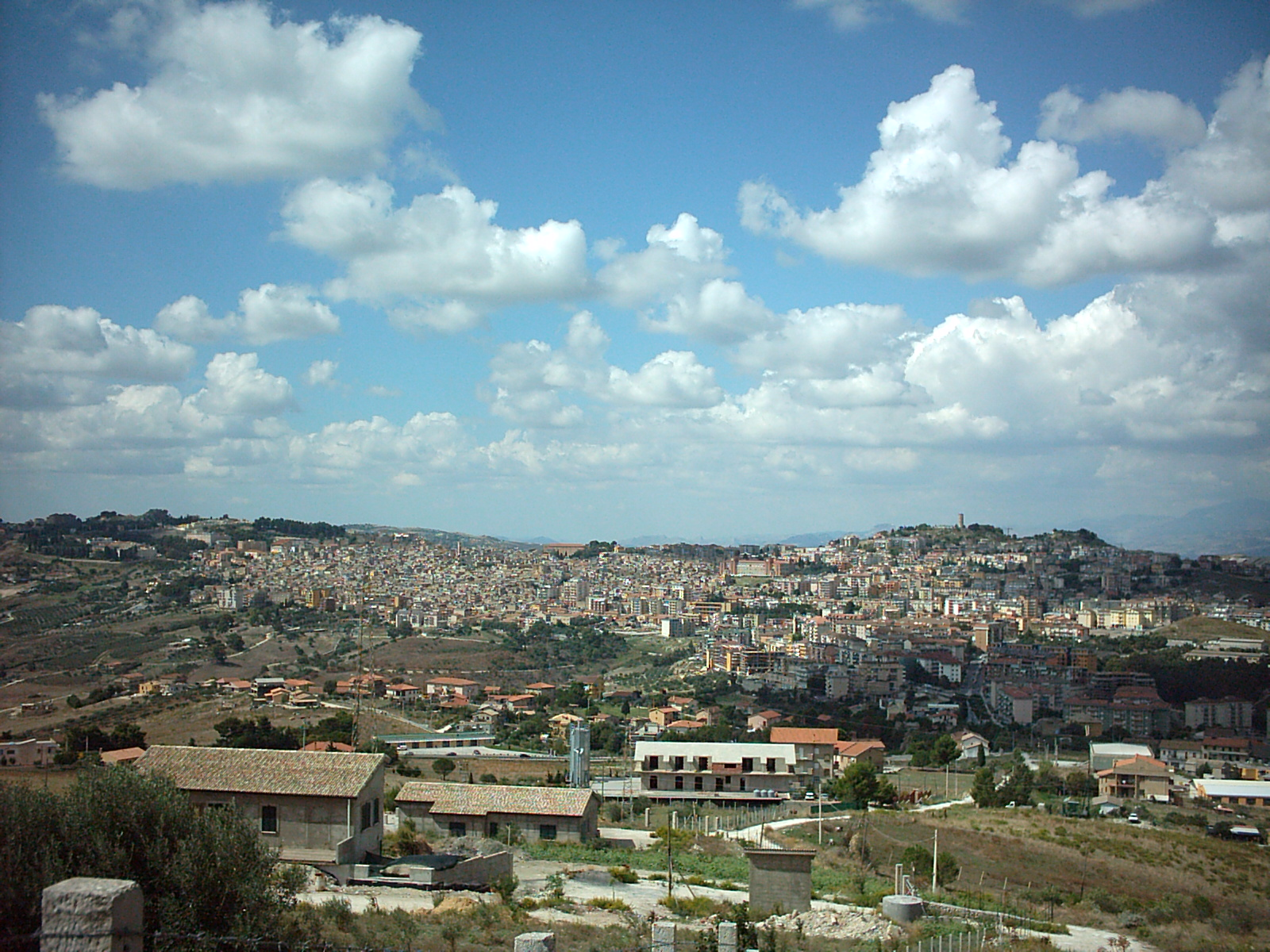

- Flag Coat of arms

- Location within Italy Location within Sicily
- Coordinates: 37°29′N 13°59′E
- Country: Italy
- Region: Sicily
- Province: Caltanissetta (CL)

Government
  - Mayor: Daniel Russo

Area
  - Total: 75,555 km^{2} (29,172 sq mi)
- Elevation: 625 m (2,051 ft)

Population (2013)
  - Total: 23,603
  - Density: 0.31239/km^{2} (0.80910/sq mi)
- Demonym: sancataldesi
- Time zone: UTC+1 (CET)
  - Summer (DST): UTC+2 (CEST)
- Postal code: 93017
- Dialing code: 0934
- Patron saint: San Cataldo
- Saint day: May 10
- Website: Official website

San Cataldo (Sicilian: San Catallu or San Cataddu) is a Sicilian town and comune in the province of Caltanissetta, in the southwestern part of the island of Sicily.

== Geography ==
San Cataldo rises in an internal hilly area, located at 625 meters above sea level, which extends north of the town, between the municipalities of Serradifalco, Mussomeli, Caltanissetta, located within the Sicilian Solfifero plateau, an ancient area mining. It is 63 km from Agrigento, 9 km from Caltanissetta, 50 km from Enna, 150 km from Ragusa. It is crossed by a single river, the "Salito", formed by springs that arise from the slopes of Mount Schiavo near the town of Santa Caterina Villarmosa. The inhabited area extends into the plateau located between Portella del Tauro and Babbaurra, rich in partially drinkable water wells.

== History ==
Near Vassallaggi there is evidence of human settlements dating back to the 6th-5th century BC.

The current inhabited center has relatively recent origins. It was a barony, then a municipality, founded by Prince Nicolò Galletti in 1607, requesting a license from the King of Sicily Philip III on 18 July (licentia populandi). The license allowed the ancient Calironi farmhouse (in Sicilian Caliruni and Greek Kalyroon) to be built and populated, located within the barony of Fiumesalato. The reasons that pushed the prince to make the request were of a political nature, as he obtained titles and privileges and acquired the right to sit in the military "arm" of the Sicilian Parliament. The economic aspect also played a non-marginal role.

The village grew thanks to immigration from nearby towns, such as Sutera, Mussomeli, Petralia, and also from more distant ones, such as Gangi, Castrogiovanni and Caltanissetta.

In 1623 the town had 722 inhabitants; in 1651 there were approximately 1,607. Eighteen years later, in 1669, ecclesiastical sources report a population of 2,490 inhabitants. In 1699 3,066 inhabitants lived there. In 1921 the town had 23,486 inhabitants.

The village took its name from Catald, or San Cataldo in Italian. He was an Irish monk who lived in the seventh century and came to south Italy after his ship was wrecked off the coast near Taranto.

== Education ==
In the past, education was entrusted to the local clergy and lessons were taught in the convent of the Mercedarian order. The school system was structured into two study cycles: primary and secondary. The school was attended mainly by the children of nobles and wealthy families, and to a lesser extent by the children of peasants and artisans.

Today, San Cataldo is home to a public art high school, the only state school with an artistic focus in the province of Nissena. Formerly a state art institute, it was founded in 1963 and named after the Messinese architect Filippo Juvara.

San Cataldo is also home to a vocational institute for agriculture and the environment, a technical-commercial institute, and a socio-psychopedagogical high school of the diocese of Caltanissetta.

== See also ==
- Catald, Irish monk and saint
