= Humaira Bachal =

Pakistani female education advocate

Humaira Bachal حمیرا بچل
- Born: 1988 (age 37–38); Thatta, Sindh, Pakistan
- Occupation: Activist for female education
- Organisation: Roshan Pakistan Academy
- Known for: Activist for the right to education, especially female education
- Parents: Muhammad Bachal (father); Zainab Bibi (mother)
- Awards: Asia 21 Young Leader (2012); Women of Impact Award (2013)

Humaira Bachal (Urdu: حمیرا بچل; born 1988) is a Pakistani female education advocate who is the founder of The Roshan Pakistan Academy.

== Early life ==
Bachal was born in 1988 in Thatta, Sindh, Pakistan to an Iranian Baloch mother Zainab Bibi and Pakistani Sindhi father Muhammad Bachal who was a truck driver by profession. When Bachal was eight years old, her family have to sell all their belongings due to indebtedness and leave Thatta. They moved to Bohri Muhalla (Bohri Neighborhood) inside Moach Goth (Moach Village) located in Karachi. A contact of her father allowed them to use his plot for residence at the cost of looking after it but no one in the family had a job so Humaira was handed over to a relative where she did their housework for leftover food. She could not endure the hardship for too long and asked her mother to take her back. Her father had to do small jobs. Bachal gave an idea to her mother to start selling the wood thus the family started collecting woods from nearby acacia shrub fields and started selling that. Bachal regularly helped her other family members in preparing the wood for a sell-able state.

== Education ==
With the money earned from wood-selling business and sewing clothes, Bachal's mother started sending Bachal and her sister to nearby Islamia Public School. Bachal was the first female child in her family to be educated. In her quest for education, she endured opposition from neighborhood elders and her own father. In 1999, after she completed her primary education from Islamia Public School which did not have further classes, her father restricted her from gaining further education but her mother was supportive. So, her mother enrolled her to Government Girls High School located in Baldia Town without the knowledge of her father. Bachal started sneaking to the school without the knowledge of her father and kept her books and school uniform hidden from him at a friend's house. Her mother kept this secret for three years while Bachal attended the school in Baldia Town where she has become the head of the students' union. When her father inquired, her mother would not give a straight answer about her whereabouts. In 2003, when she was about to take her 9th grade exam, her father learned of the feat and she and her mother suffered domestic abuse at the hands of her father. She was able to take the 9th grade exam due to her mother's intervention against her father's opposition. She went on to complete her metriculation in 2004. Beyond matriculation, she wanted to study medicine but could not afford the fees thus she enrolled into a madrasa where she pursued a degree equivalent to Bachelor of Arts but quit before completing it when threatened with a kidnapping after she had disagreements with the teachers who had misconstrued concept of Islam regarding treatment and role of women in Islamic society. She went on to complete her bachelor's degree eventually, learned English and is pursuing a master's degree.

== Activism ==
In 1998, when Bachal was ten years old, one of her cousins died after taking an expired medicine given by his mother because his mother could not read the expiry date due to her illiteracy. This inspired her to launch a campaign for female education. In 2001, When she was in sixth grade and only thirteen years old, she asked her school-going friends to donate their old books and stationery. She started teaching her neighborhood children with that donated learning material in a makeshift classroom in her home. Ten of her friends who were not enrolled in a school were attending that class.

In 2003, Bachal's resolve for education advocacy further strengthened when she passed the 9th grade exam and she started paying close attention around her neighborhood. It struck her that most children just spent their days playing in the streets and none of them attended a school. Same year, she opened a small private school from her home. She started knocking at people's doors and requested the parents to send their kids to school. Bachal visited fathers at their job locations and tried to convince them to send their daughters to school while she warned mothers to educate their girls if they do not want their daughters to be treated in a similar fashion in the society and home as they are being treated. One of the tactics she used to convince the parents to send their girls to school was that she offered an incentive of getting two sons educated for free for sending one girl to school. During this endeavor of going door to door to advocate for education, her life was threatened several times.

The efforts resulted in the school growing into 150 students and five teachers. The space in her home was not good enough to accommodate the grown class so they decided to rent a two-room building with mud floors. They leveled the ground for the school yard and hoisted flour sacks on wooden poles for shade but they would get destroyed in rain so they hired an iron smith to make metal poles and hoisted signboards made out of Panaflex which was more durable. Child and Youth Welfare, an organization which promotes home literacy, found out about their initiative and provided textbooks and Rs.1000 per month, which they used to pay the rent. That continued until 2007 when Shirkat Gah Women's Resource Centre provided her access to the financial assistance program offered by Rotary Club of Karachi. In 2009, access to that financial assistance helped her found The Dream Foundation Trust with formally naming the school as Dream Model Street School. Some folks were still against her campaign and were bothered so much because of her insistence for them to send their kids to school that they pressured her family to move out of that neighborhood by sending ruffians to their house. Once, the school building was locked by the owner but she continued to teach the classes out in the open and in front of the building until the owner gave in and let them in. The rent for the school building increased to Rs.3000 so she had to find a job to help pay it off.

On 28 March 2009, Shirkat Gah launched a documentary on her work at South Asia Free Media Association and invited her and family to the launching event which made her cause known to the wider world thus The Dream Foundation Trust started building another school one kilometers away from the rented building and it was completed with the help of Engro Vopak, Volkart Foundation, Madonna, and her Ray of Light Foundation. That school consists of eleven rooms and is dispensing education to 1,200 children for one rupee a day each in a co-educational setting and there are 33 volunteer teachers to teach them. The school has four shifts and offers computer classes in addition to the regular education. There is an evening shift for those boys who work all day.

In the afternoon, a two-hour religious class is offered to lure parents to send their kids to the school. She employs an interactive teaching approach instead of passive approach of rote learning for which the government schools are known for. She organizes field trips for students and utilizes visualization and e-learning methods of teaching. Her teaching approach earned the school World Summit Youth Award in Education for All category in 2011. Through her trust, she also offers adult literacy classes for men and women which are mostly attended by older girls so they can complete their matriculation. The school offers free books, has no uniform and the fees to attend is only for the people who can afford to pay. She hopes to build similar schools in 114 slum establishments of Kiamari and a university. Her advocacy resulted in big change at her home as she gained respect in her community, her father became big supporter of her efforts and he started advocating for girl's education alongside Bachal.

There are many government schools in the neighborhood which has become "ghost". She is working to revive those schools through her trust and has revived couple of them so far.

== Career ==
She worked as a mobilizer for a micro-finance project then she began exporting beauty products to Iran but when the border was closed, she started giving leadership training.

== Media portrayal ==
She was portrayed as one of the extraordinary Pakistanis in Humaira: The Dream Catcher filmed by Sharmeen Obaid-Chinoy. She was also the subject of Salma Hayek's documentary production Humaira: The Game Changer.

== Awards and honours ==
In 2012, Bachal was selected as Asia 21 Young Leader in Dhaka, Bangladesh. She was awarded Women of Impact Award in 2013 at 4th annual Women of the World Festival hosted at the Lincoln Center in New York City, United States.

== See also ==
- Children's rights
- Women's education in Pakistan
- Women's rights in Pakistan
- Malala Yousafzai
- Farida Afridi
- Bibi Aisha
- Muzoon Almellehan
- Sahar Gul
- Aitzaz Hasan
- Women's rights in 2014
- British Pakistanis

== Bibliography ==
- Caroline Criado-Perez (7 May 2015), "Choosing Like a Woman", Do It Like a Woman: ... and Change the World, Portobello Books, ISBN 978-1-84-627580-7
- Peter G. Northouse (6 February 2017), Introduction to Leadership: Concepts and Practice, SAGE Publishing, pp. 244–245, ISBN 978-1-50-637835-0
- David C. S. Lee (12 January 2017), Multilingual Hong Kong: Languages, Literacies and Identities, Springer Publishing, p. 241, ISBN 978-3-31-944195-5
- Gayle Kimball (8 September 2017), "Brave Women in Muslim Countries", Brave: Young Women's Global Revolution, BookBaby, ISBN 978-0-93-879560-5
