= Oenotrians =

Semilegendary village of the peninsula italica

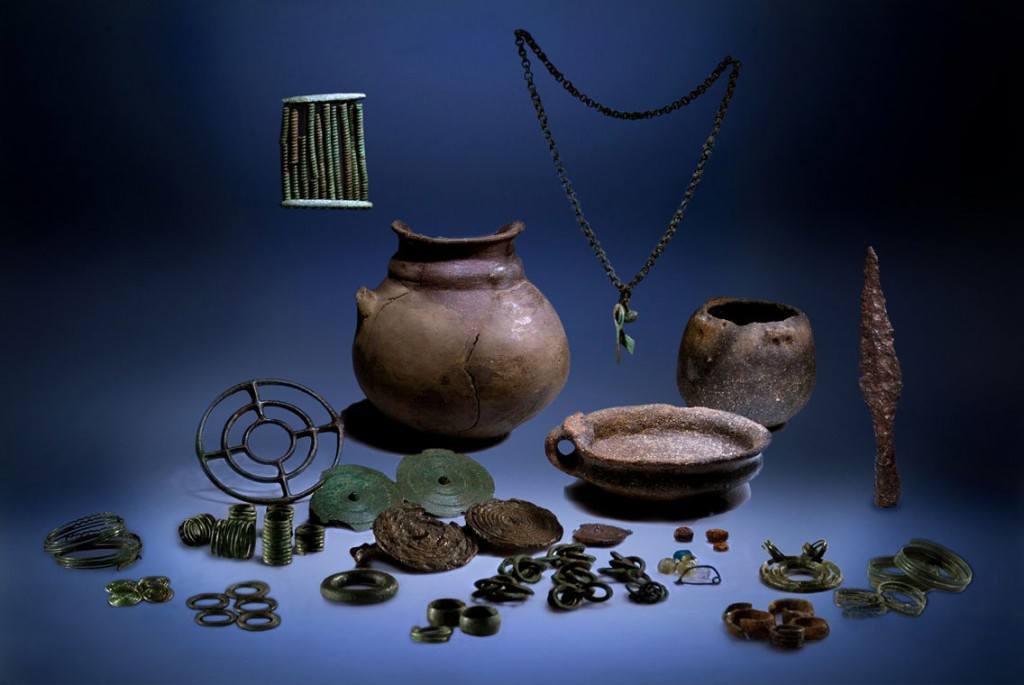
Wealthy funeral equipment of the Enotri, preserved from the Necropolis of Torre del Mordillo.

The Oenotrians or Enotrians were an ancient Italic people who lived between the 8th and 7th centuries BC, occupying a territory in Southern Italy that included western Basilicata, the Vallo di Diano, the coastal strip of Cilento, and northern Calabria. By the sixth century BC, the Oenotrians had been absorbed into other Italic tribes.

== Etymology ==
A likely derivation of the ethnonym Oenotrian is the Greek oînos (οἶνος, 'wine'), as the Oenotrians inhabited a territory rich in vineyards, with Oenotria or Enotria (Οἰνωτρία, Oinōtría) being extended to refer to the entirety of Southern Italy. Hesychius mentions the word oínōtron (οἴνωτρον), a kind of a vine stake.

== History ==
The Oenotrians are thought to have been the southern branch of an ancient people, distinct from the Proto-Latins, who lived along the Tyrrhenian coast from Liguria to Sicily (the Ligurian/Sicanian group). They are generally depicted as belonging to the Pelasgians. According to Antoninus Liberalis and Hellanicus, their arrival triggered the migration of the Elymians to Sicily around 1260 BC.

Ancient authors from the 1st century BC state that Oenotria was named after Oenotrus, the youngest of the fifty sons of Lycaon who migrated there from Arcadia in Peloponnese, Greece. However, inscriptions from the 6th or the 5th century BC in the ancient Oenotrian settlement of Tortora reveal that they spoke an Italic language.

Virgil (70–21 BC) mentions them as the settlers whose descendants now call their land Italy after the name of their leader Italus. Pliny the Elder (23–79 AD) mentions that "opposite Velia are Pontia and Isacia, both known under the name of Oenotrides, a proof that Italy was formerly possessed by the Oenotrians".

The settlement of the Greeks with the first stable colonies such as Metapontum pushed the Oenotrians inland and started a war of attrition with the Greek colonies, which they plundered more than once.

From the 5th century BC the Oenotrians disappeared under the pressure of the Lucanians.

== Language ==
In 1991, inscriptions dating from the 6th or the 5th century BC were discovered in the ancient Oenotrian settlement of Tortora, Calabria, and revealed that the Oenotrians spoke an Italic language.

== See also ==
- King Italus
- Ancient people of Italy
