= Polizzello helmet =

The Polizzello helmet is a Cretan production in bronze of the seventh century BC perfectly preserved. The cheeckpieces are engraved with the images of a warrior (Hoplite). It comes from the excavations of the archaeological site of Polizzello near Mussomeli in the Province of Caltanissetta.

After careful restoration, it is now preserved and exposed in the modern premises of the Regional Archaeological Museum of Caltanissetta site in Contrada Santo Spirito near the Abbey of the Holy Spirit.

== Sources ==
- Rosalba Panvini, Carla Guzzone, Dario Palermo. Polizzello: Scavi del 2004 nell'area del santuario arcaico dell'acropoli. Regione Siciliana - Assessorato dei Beni Culturali, Ambientali e della Pubblica Istruzione Dipartimento dei Beni Culturali, Ambientali, dell’Educazione Permanente, dell’Architettura e dell’Arte Contemporanea. 2009. p. 84 ISBN 978-88-616-4132-7
