= Italus =

Mythical eponym of Italy

Italus or Italos (from Ancient Greek: Ἰταλός) was a legendary king of the Oenotrians, ancient people of Italic origin who inhabited the region now called Calabria, in southern Italy. In his Fabularum Liber (or Fabulae), Gaius Julius Hyginus recorded the myth that Italus was a son of Penelope and Telegonus (a son of Odysseus by Circe).

According to Aristotle (Politics) and Thucydides (History of the Peloponnesian War), Italus was the eponym of Italy (Italia). Aristotle, writing in the 4th century BCE, relates that, according to tradition, Italus converted the Oenotrians from a pastoral society to an agricultural one and gave them various ordinances, being the first to institute their system of common meals.

Writing centuries later, the Greek historian Dionysius of Halicarnassus (c. 60 BCE – after 7 BCE) in his Rhomaike Archaiologia (Antiquitates romanae, "Roman Antiquities"), cites Antiochus of Syracuse (fl. 420 BCE) for the information that Italus was an Oenotrian by birth and relates the tradition that Italia was named after him, as well as another account that derives the name "Italia" from a word for calf, an etymology also given by Timaeus, Varro, and Festus.
