= Ducetius =

5th-century BC Sicel chieftain

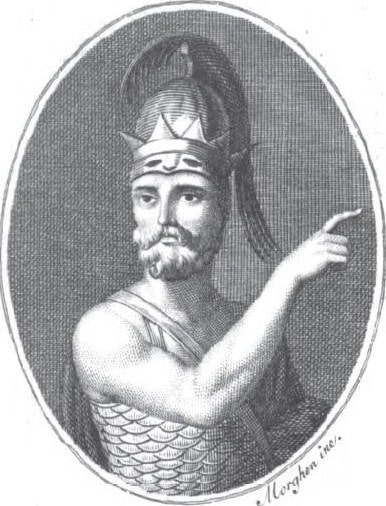
Ducetius

Ducetius (Ancient Greek: Δουκέτιος) (died 440 BCE) was a Hellenized leader of the Sicels and founder of a united Sicilian state and numerous cities. It is thought he may have been born around the town of Mineo. His story is told through the Greek historian Diodorus Siculus in the 1st century BCE, who drew on the work of Timaeus. He was a native Sicilian, but his education was Greek and was very much influenced by Greek civilization in Sicily. He is sometimes known by the Hellenized name of Douketios.

== The Sicel revolt ==
Sicily at this time was under the tyranny of Gelo and his brother Hiero. After the death of Hiero in 467 BCE, Syracuse became a democracy. There were however, troubles in the aftermath of the tyranny's collapse. War had broken out between Syracuse and its former colony Catana in 460 BCE. Ducetius assisted Syracuse because Catana had occupied Sicel land, and together defeated them. Ducetius went on to found the city of Menai (today Mineo) and occupy Morgantina.

By 452 BCE he had united central Sicily and founded the city of Palice, the seat of his power, near Lago Naftia, then two holy crater lakes and site of a sanctuary of a pair of Sicel gods called the Palici. The city grew quickly as it became a place of refuge for runaway slaves. Ducetius then conquered Aetna, southwest of Mount Etna, before moving into Agrigentum.

Syracuse, although an ally, became concerned by Ducetius' unchecked expansion. However, Ducetius did not necessarily pose a threat to Syracuse in the same way Carthage had. But with Ducetius' taking in 451 BCE of Motyon, a stronghold held by Agrigentum, Syracuse decided to assist Agrigentum, but was not able to defeat him. It was in this year that Ducetius' Sicel empire was at its height. Only a year later in 450 BCE, it would be decisively defeated at Nomae. His surviving army was scattered amongst the Sicel cities, and Ducetius was left with only a handful of followers. Agrigentum retook Motyon and Ducetius fled to Syracuse. Ducetius was tried by a general assembly in Syracuse. They voted to pay to have him exiled to Corinth, Syracuse's mother-city, on the condition that he never return to Sicily.

== The foundation of Kale Akte (Caleacte) ==
However, Ducetius did return and, according to Diodorus, in 446 BCE founded the city of Kale Akte (in the province of Messina), supposedly on the instructions of an oracle. The city comprised both Sicel and Corinthian settlers. In 440 BCE, Ducetius died of illness.

This traditional version is, however, not without problems. Diodorus Siculus, in another passage, says that Ducetius colonised Kale Akte in 440 BCE, the same year he died. Thus, the date of foundation seems to be uncertain. In addition, recent excavations at Caronia, the site of the Hellenistic and Roman Caleacte, have revealed only very sparse remains from the 5th century BCE, and show that a Sicel settlement already existed in the early 5th century BCE. Possibly, Ducetius died before a more lasting colony could be established, and in the aftermath of his death, the Sicels revolted against Syracuse.

The Sicel federation fell apart almost immediately after Ducetius' death, and Palice was sacked shortly thereafter and its inhabitants sold into slavery. Thus, the particular conditions of concord which had existed after the return of Ducetius between the Sicels and Syracuse vanished.

Some scholars have hypothesised that Ducetius returned without the consent of Syracuse, but this is very improbable. He must have had the permission of Syracuse to end the exile at Corinth (the mother city of Syracuse), and, according to Diodorus, he brought partly Corinthian settlers for the colonising project at Kale Akte. Syracuse would have had an interest of establishing an allied Sicel-Greek colony on the north coast, without risking too much in a potentially hostile Sicel-dominated area.
