= Tortora =

- Comune
- Comune di Tortora
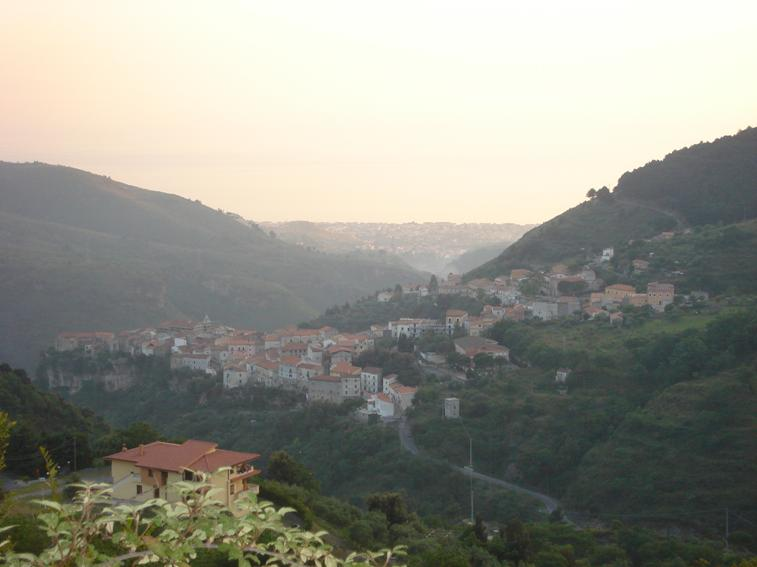

- Location within Italy Location within Calabria
- Coordinates: 39°58′N 15°48′E
- Country: Italy
- Region: Calabria
- Province: Cosenza (CS)

Government
  - Mayor: Pasquale Lamboglia

Area
  - Total: 58.22 km^{2} (22.48 sq mi)
- Elevation: 312 m (1,024 ft)

Population (2008)
  - Total: 5,974
  - Density: 102.6/km^{2} (265.8/sq mi)
- Demonym: Tortoresi (Turturisi in the local dialect)
- Time zone: UTC+1 (CET)
  - Summer (DST): UTC+2 (CEST)
- Postal code: 87020
- Dialing code: 0985, 0973
- Patron saint: St. Blaise, St. Anthony of Padua
- Saint day: 3 February
- Website: Official website

Tortora (Calabrian: Tùrturi) is a town and comune in the province of Cosenza in the Calabria region of southern Italy.
