= Battle of the Himera River (311 BC) =

311 BC battle between Carthage and Syracuse

Coordinates: 37°6′N 13°56′E

- Part of The Sicilian Wars
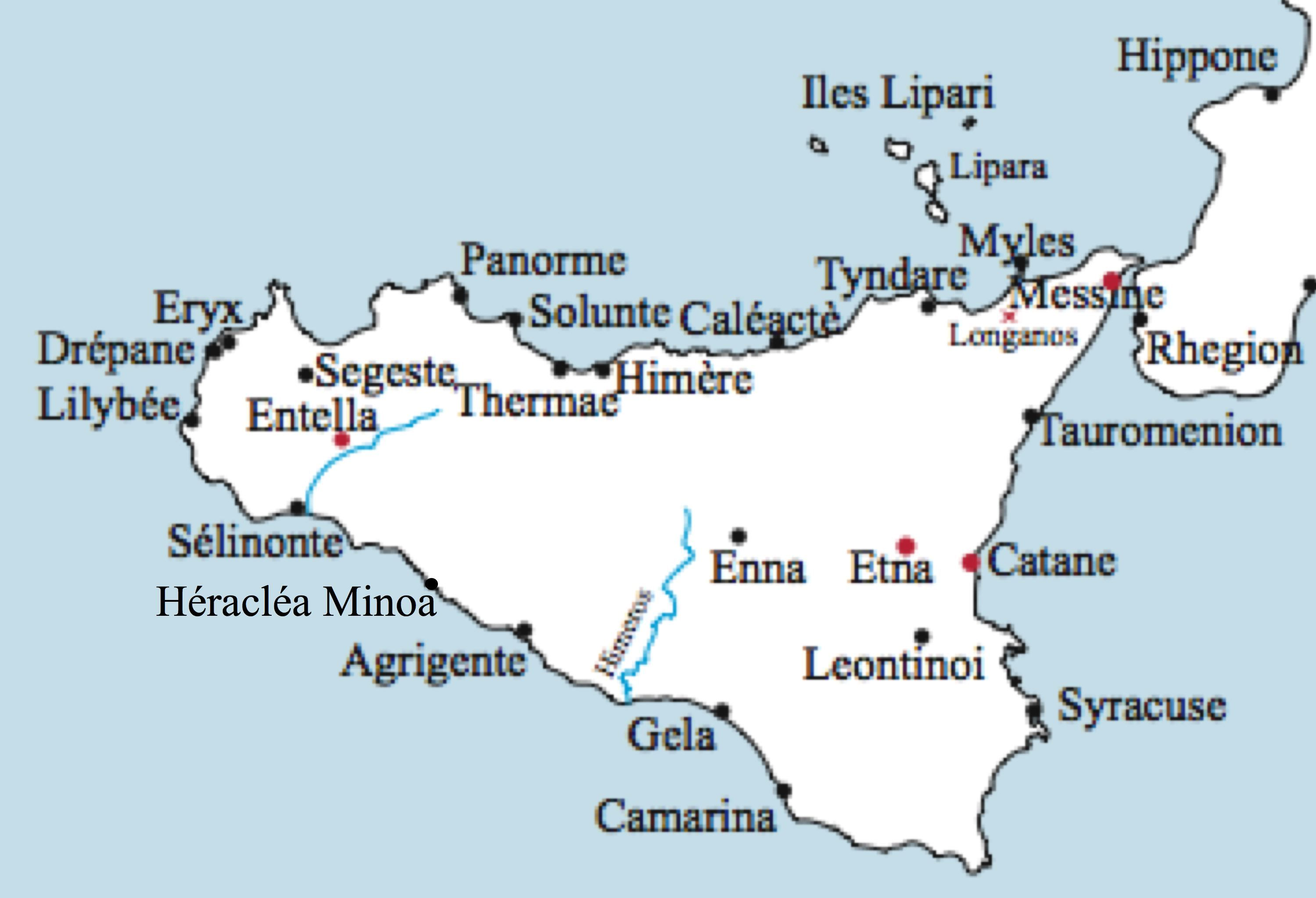
- Map of the main cities of Sicily
Date	311 BC
Location	At the mouth of the Salso river, near modern Licata on Sicily, Italy
Result	Carthaginian victory

Belligerents
Carthage	Syracuse

Commanders and leaders
Hamilcar	Agathocles of Syracuse

Strength
39,000 infantry, 1,000 Balearic slingers, 5,000 cavalry	40,000

Casualties and losses
500	7,000

The Battle of the Himera River was fought in 311 BC between Carthage and Syracuse near the mouth of the Himera river (the modern Salso river). Hamilcar, grandson of Hanno the Great, led the Carthaginians, while the Syracusans were led by Agathocles. Agathocles initially surprised the Carthaginians with an attack on their camp, but the Greeks lost the battle when they were attacked by unexpected Carthaginian reinforcements. The Greek army took many casualties as it retreated. Agathocles managed to gather the remains of his army and retreat to Syracuse, but lost control of Sicily.

In classical antiquity the name Himera was used for two rivers on Sicily: the Imera Settentrionale and the Salso. The Imera Settentrionale flows north towards its mouth at the site of ancient Himera, the Salso follows a southern course to its mouth in modern Licata. The battle took place near the mouth of the Salso river because the Carthaginians positioned themselves on the hill of Ecnomus during the battle. This hill lies west of Licata.

== Background ==
After Agathocles was exiled for an attempt to usurp power in his own city Syracuse, he was received by Morgantina, an enemy of Syracuse. As their general-in-chief he conducted a war for them, took Leontini and besieged Syracuse. The Syracusans turned to their enemy Carthage for help and were given reinforcements under the command of the Carthaginian general Hamilcar. Agathocles realized he could not take Syracuse, so he decided to make an alliance with Hamilcar instead. Hamilcar agreed, out of fear of the power of Agathocles, but also because he was promised favors to increase his power in Carthage.

The specific terms of the treaty stipulated that the Sicilian Greek towns Heraclea Minoa, Selinunte and Himera were to be controlled by Carthage as had previously been the case, and all the others were to be autonomous under the hegemony of Syracuse. The treaty also included an end to the war of Acragas, Gela and Messene with Agathocles. Hamilcar turned over Syracuse to Agathocles and left him with five thousand African troops. Agathocles then massacred the senate and the richest common people of the city and made himself tyrant.

Agathocles then proceeded to raise an army and broke the treaty. He attacked the neighbouring cities of Syracuse and the Sicilian cities allied with Carthage, but Hamilcar did not act against him. These cities complained to the senate of Carthage. The senate was not able to do much about it because Hamilcar was in command of the army. They decided to delay punishing Hamilcar until another Hamilcar, the son of Gisco, returned from Sicily. Hamilcar died before this could happen, and upon his return the other Hamilcar was sent to Sicily with an army.

== Prelude ==
Hamilcar was sent to Sicily with 130 triremes, 2,000 citizen soldiers, 10,000 Libyans, 1,000 mercenaries, 200 Etruscans, and 1,000 Balearic slingers. After the army's departure from Carthage, sixty triremes and two hundred supply ships were lost in a storm. Some of the citizens soldiers, of which many were nobles, died in the storm. Once on Sicily, Hamilcar managed to reinforce his army with more mercenaries and troops of the Sicilian allies, as well as the Carthaginian troops already present there. At this point his force numbered about 40,000 infantry and nearly 5,000 cavalry.

Agathocles recognized that the Carthaginian army was superior to his own and feared that several of the cities under his control would desert him for Carthage. In particular he was concerned for Gela because the Carthaginian army was positioned in its territory. At the same time he suffered a considerable loss of twenty ships, which had been captured by the Carthaginians. Even so, he gave priority to keeping Gela under his control. He did not send in a garrison straight away because he feared the Geloans would shut him out, but sent in his troops a few at a time to trick them. When his troops eventually surpassed those of the Geloans, he took over the city and ordered four thousand Geloans to be slain. He confiscated their property and commanded the other inhabitants to turn over their money, gold and silver. He left the city with a garrison and then marched towards the Carthaginians.

== Battle ==
The Carthaginians occupied the hill Ecnomus, which was said to have been a stronghold of Phalaris, a tyrant of Acragas. The hill acquired its name, which literally means 'lawless', because Phalaris had reputedly tortured people there in his brazen bull. On the other side Agathocles occupied another stronghold which had belonged to Phalaris, the Phalarium. Between the strongholds ran the Himera river, which both sides used as a defense against each other.

For a long time both sides did not risk crossing the river in force. Diodorus attributes this to sayings from earlier times which foretold that a great number of men were destined to die in battle at this place. Both sides engaged in raiding their enemy's territory and camp. When Greeks were driving away beasts of burden from the enemy camp, Carthaginian troops pursued them. Agathocles set up an ambush for the pursuers near the river, who were easily driven back when they tried to cross the river.

Agathocles exploited this opportunity to start the battle. He ordered his whole army to cross the river and attacked the enemy camp. The Greeks threw down the palisade and took the Carthaginians by surprise. They had no opportunity to form a line of battle and fought fiercely for the moat, but the Greeks won the contest.

To counter the attack Hamilcar ordered his elite Balearic slingers to unleash a hail of stones on the attackers. Many Greeks were wounded or killed and driven away from the camp. Agathocles continued to attack the camp at other points and was close to taking the camp. The Greeks were then attacked by unexpected reinforcements from Libya which arrived by ship. The battle reversed itself and the Greeks fled to the Himera river or their camp.

The Greeks withdrew over a distance of forty stades, about 4.5 miles (7.2 km), while being pursued by the Carthaginian cavalry. Because the pursuit took place during the middle of the day most of the fleeing Greeks became thirsty due to the heat and drank the water from the Himera river. Because the Himera river is naturally salty (which is reflected by its modern name Salso) many Greeks died from drinking its water. According to Diodorus the number of casualties caused by the river were roughly equal to the number of Greeks killed in the pursuit. He states that in the whole battle 500 Carthaginians and 7,000 Greeks fell. Agathocles had managed to survive and collected those who had survived the rout. He burned his camp and withdrew into Gela.

== Aftermath ==
Agathocles decided to remain in Gela for some time to divert the Carthaginian army from Syracuse. This allowed the Syracusans to harvest their crops. Hamilcar first tried to besiege the city, but gave up when he discovered that Agathocles had large supplies and enough soldiers to defend the city. He then visited the cities and strongholds which were still siding with Agathocles to win them over. Because they despised Agathocles they soon deserted to the Carthaginians. Agathocles retreated to Syracuse and lost control over the rest of Sicily, while Carthage had gained superiority in land and naval forces. Agathocles supplied Syracuse with grain, left it with an adequate garrison and then crossed over to Libya to transfer the war to Africa.

== Notes ==
1. In classical antiquity the name Libya referred to Ancient Libya, which extended from modern Morocco to the western border of Ancient Egypt.

== Sources ==
- Diodorus Siculus (1954). Geer, Russell M. (ed.). Library of History. Vol. 10. Cambridge, Massachusetts: Harvard University Press. ISBN 978-0-674-99429-4.
- Justin (1853). Watson, John Selby (ed.). Epitome of the Philippic History of Pompeius Trogus. London: Henry G. Bohn.
- Lazenby, John (2001). "Ecnomus, battle of". In Holmes, Richard; Singleton, Charles; Jones, Spencer (eds.). The Oxford Companion to Military History. Oxford, England: Oxford University Press. ISBN 978-0-198-60696-3.
