= Castelluccio culture =

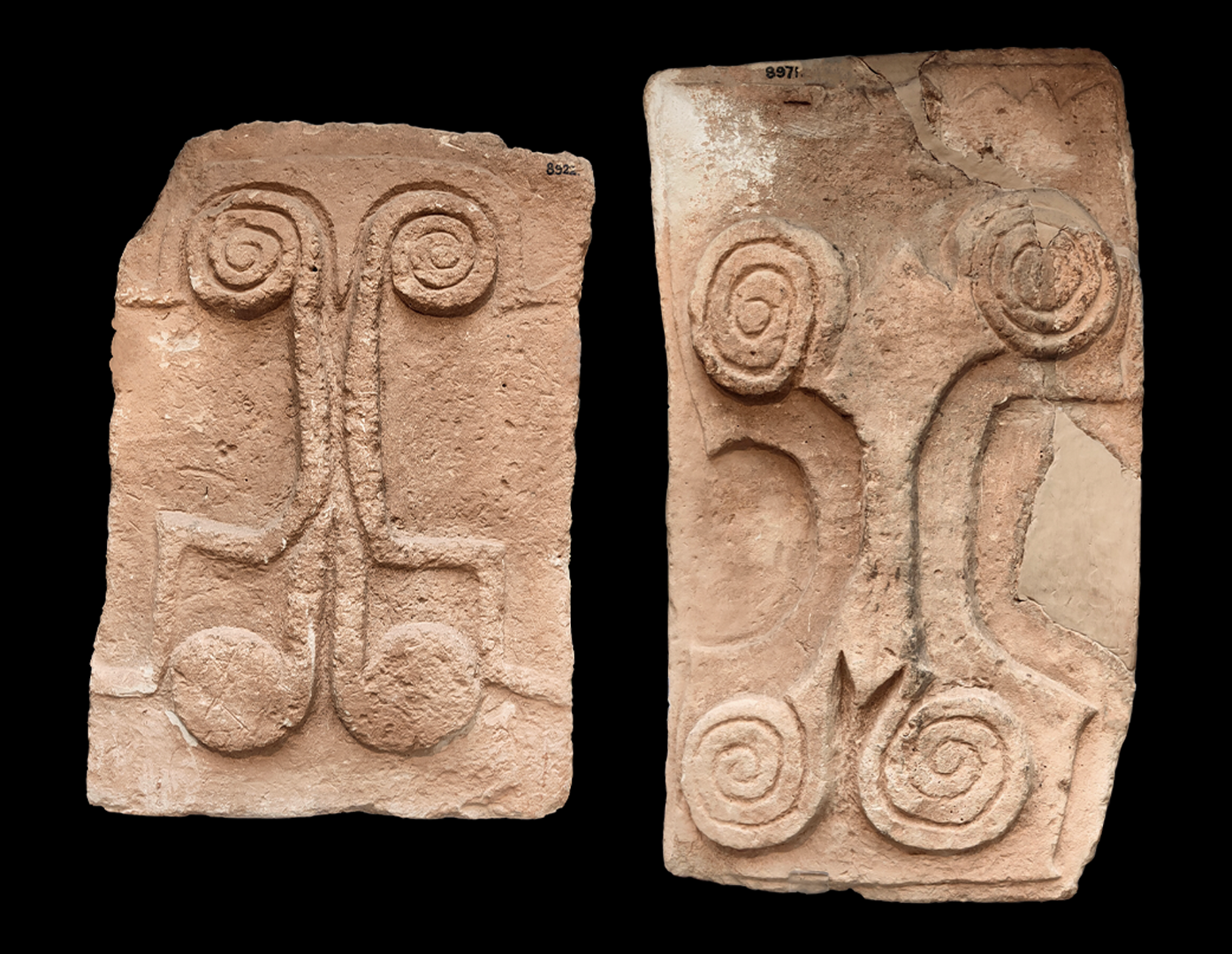
Door slabs with motifs from the Castelluccio site in Noto, Sicily

Castelluccio culture is an archaeological feature dating to Ancient Bronze Age (2000 B.C. approximately) of the prehistoric civilization of Sicily, originally identified by Paolo Orsi on the basis of a particular ceramic style, in the homonymous village, between Noto and Siracusa.

The discovery of a prehistoric village in Castelluccio di Noto, next to the remains of prehistoric circular huts, a Ceramic glass decorated with brown lines on a yellow-reddish background, and also tri-colour with the use of white. The weapons used in the days of Castelluccio culture were greenstone and basalt axes and, in the most recent settlements, bronze axes. Frequently carved bones, considered idols similar to those of Malta, and of Troy II and III. Burials were made in rounded tombs carved into the rock, with doors with relief carving of spiral symbols and motifs that evoke the sexual act. Castelluccio culture is dated to a period between 2200 BC and 1800 BC, although some belief it to be contemporary to Middle-Late Helladic period (1800/1400 BC).

Castelluccio culture was present in the villages of south-east Sicily, Monte Casale, Cava d'Ispica, Pachino, Niscemi, Cava Lazzaro, near Noto, of Rosolini, in the rocky Byzantine district of coasts of Santa Febronia in Palagonia, in Cuddaru d' Crastu (Tornabé-Mercato d'Arrigo) near Pietraperzia, where there are the remains of a fortress partly carved in stone, and - with different ceramic forms - also near Agrigento in Monte Grande. The discovery of a cup of Etna type in the area of Comiso, among local ceramic objects led to the discovery of commercial trades with Castelluccio sites of Paternò, Adrano and Biancavilla, whose graves differ in making due to the hard basaltic terrain and also for the utilization of the lava caves as chamber tombs.

In the area around Ragusa evidence of mining by ancient Castelluccio residents has been found; tunnels excavated by the use of basalt tools allowed the extraction and production of highly sought flints. Some funerary dolmens, dated back to this same period, have been found in different parts of Sicily but are not attributable to the Castelluccio Culture.

== Curiosities ==
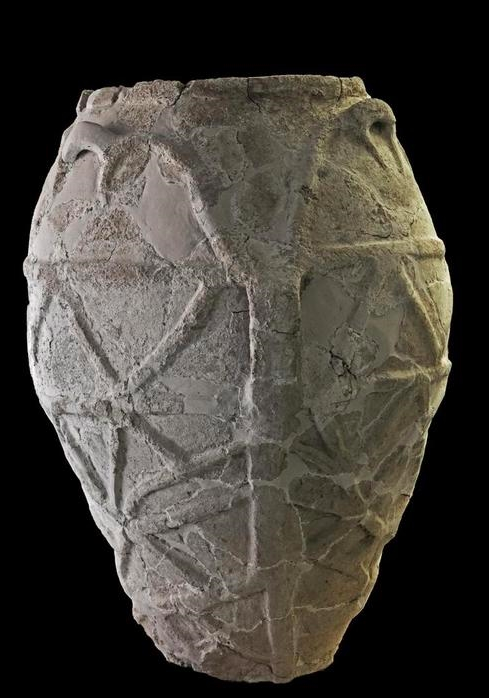
The jar found in Castelluccio di Noto (Syracuse) - Image by Polo Regionale di Syracuse / Paolo Orsi Museum

The oldest olive oil in Europe was made in Castelluccio over 4000 years ago, remains of which were found in a ceramic jar and other terracotta fragments in the 1990’s. The fragments of the jar were analysed by the Italian team of Decide Tanasi, which works in the American University of South Florida. Researchers have identified traces of oleic and linoleic acids, which are the signatures of olive oil in the ceramic jar found during excavations at an archaeological site in Castelluccio di Noto in the 1990s. The restorers had completely reconstructed the ceramic jar, obtained by recomposing 400 fragments; it is one meter high it has a shape of an egg, with three handles on the sides. The results were published in the Analytical Methods journal. This discovery pushes by 700 years the previous finding of the most ancient history of olive oil.

== See also ==
- Thapsos Culture
- Monte Grande (Palma di Montechiaro)
- Polizzello archaeological site
- Prehistoric Italy
- Ancient peoples of Italy
