= Sicani =

Ancient people of Sicily

Approximate locations of the Elymians and their neighbors, the Sicani and the Sicels, in Sicily around 11th century BC (before the arrival of the Phoenicians and the Greeks).

The Sicani or Sicanians were one of three ancient peoples of Sicily present at the time of Phoenician and Greek colonization. The Sicani dwelt east of the Elymians and west of the Sicels, having, according to Diodorus Siculus, the boundary with the last in the ancient Himera river (Salso) after a series of battles between these tribes.

== History ==
The Sicani are the oldest inhabitants of Sicily with a recorded name. In the 5th century BCE, the Greek historian Thucydides, claims that the Sicani originated on the Iberian Peninsula, from around a river they called "Sicanus" and had migrated to Sicily following an invasion by the Ligurians. (The name Sicanus has been linked to the river known in modern Spanish as the Júcar.) Thucydides' source is unknown, although he often draws on the Sicilian historian Antiochus of Syracuse. Conversely, Timaeus of Tauromenium (writing c. 300 BCE) considers the Sicani to be indigenous to Sicily. A third theory, put forward by some modern scholars, suggests that the Sicani were immigrants, who gained control of areas previously inhabited by native tribes. The testimony of a Sicanian migration by land is supported by Greek geographer Pausanias (writing c. 150 BCE), who does not seem to depend on Thucydides when he asserts that three peoples arrived in Sicily: Sicani, Sicels and Phrygians: the first two came from Italy, while the third came from Troy. Pliny the Elder and Gaius Julius Solinus also mention the Sicani, among the peoples of the Mount Albanus league in the Old Latium. The Sicans are mentioned in Virgil's Aeneid as allies of the Rutuli, Aurunci and Sacrani of Old Latium. Aulus Gellius and Macrobius remember them with the Aurunci and the Pelasgians. Archaeological research suggests that the Sicani were influenced at an early stage by the Mycenaeans (prior to the Greek colonisation of Sicily).

It is generally agreed by scholars that the Sicani preceded other inhabitants of Sicily in prehistory, namely the Elymians and Sicels. The former are thought to be the next recorded people to settle Sicily. According to Hellanicus of Lesbos, Elymians were a population of Italic origin, who arrived in Sicily after having fought a war with the Oenotrians. They settled in the north-west corner of the island, forcing the Sicanians to move across eastward. The Sicels were the next to arrive, from mainland Italy, and settled in the east. The arrival of the Sicels is thought to have occurred during the thirteenth or eleventh century BCE. The Sicanians area after this became limited to the south-western part of the island with settlements in the area of Gela and Agrigentum.

The Sicani enter the historical record with the Phoenicians, who established colonies during the 11th century BCE – preceding the Greeks, who founded the colony of Syracuse. While many other Greek colonies were established around the island, by 734 BCE Syracuse had become the largest city in the Greek-speaking world. The Sicani were gradually absorbed by these colonizing peoples. They disappeared as a distinct people following the annexation of Sicily by the Roman Republic.

== Herodotus and King Minos ==
Minos, according to tradition, went to Sicania, or Sicily, as it is now called, in search of Daedalus, and there perished by a violent death.

== See also ==
- Ancient peoples of Italy
- Prehistoric Italy
