= Imera Settentrionale =

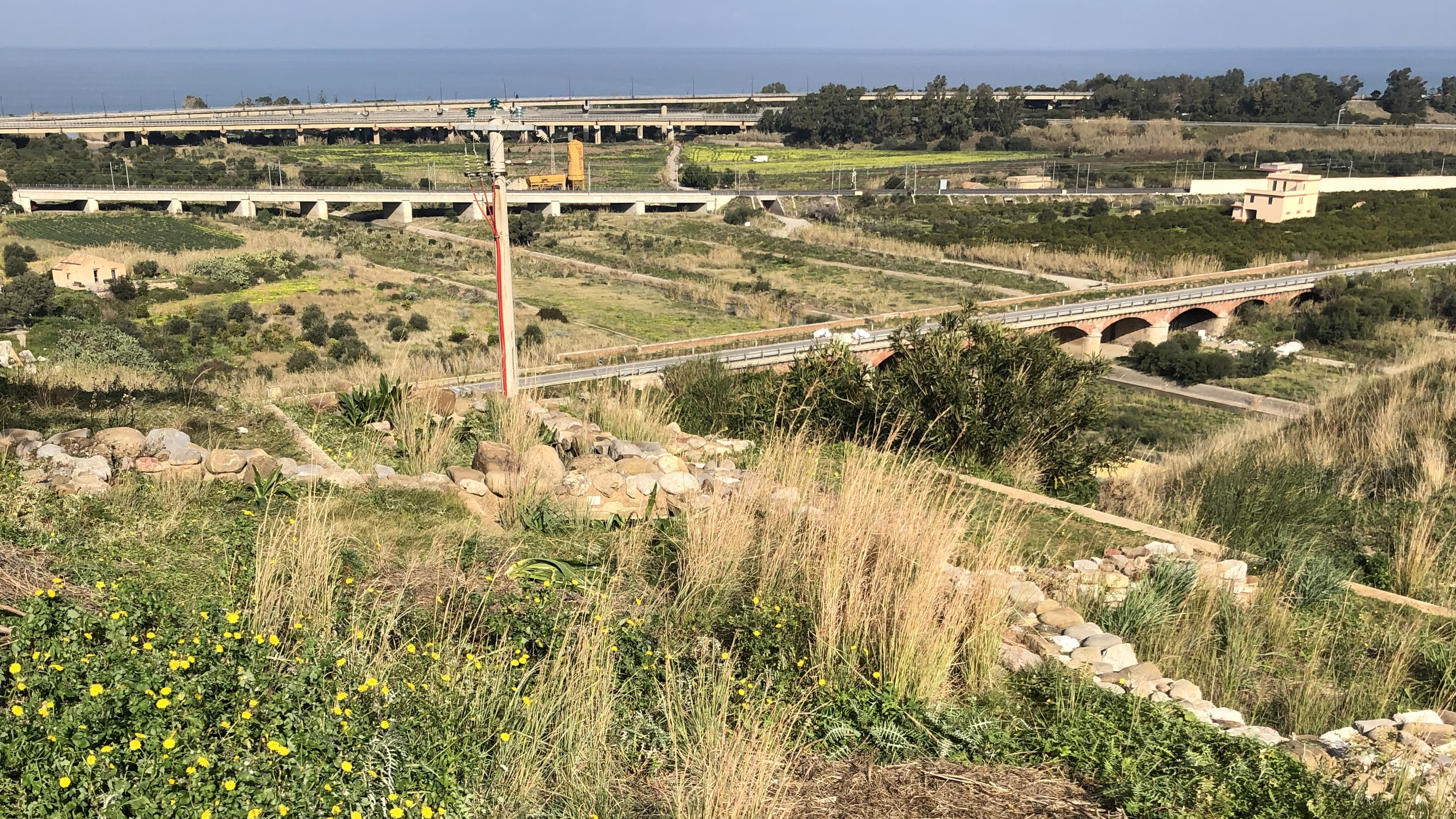

Location
- Country: Italy
- Region: Sicily

Physical characteristics
- Mouth: Tyrrhenian Sea
  - coordinates: 37.9824°N 13.8228°E
- Length: 35 km (22 mi)
- Basin size: 342 km^{2} (132 sq mi)

The Imera Settentrionale (Greek: Ἱμέρας, Latin: Himera; Italian: Imera Settentrionale or also Fiume Grande) is a river of Sicily, rising in the Western Madonie mountains near Cozzo Levanche, and flowing approximately 35 kilometres (22 mi) through the comuni of Caltavuturo, Campofelice di Roccella, Cerda, Collesano, Scillato, Sclafani Bagni, Termini Imerese and Valledolmo (all in the Province of Palermo) to the Tyrrhenian Sea at the site of the ancient city of Himera. The drainage area is 342 square kilometres (132 mi^{2}), making it one of the principal rivers of Sicily to flow into the Tyrrhenian.

== Historical significance ==
Himera was the ancient name of two rivers in Sicily, the Imera Settentrionale flowing to the north into the Tyrrhenian Sea, the other (the Salso) to the south coast of the island, but which, by a strange confusion, were regarded by many ancient writers as one and the same river, which is in consequence described as rising in the center of the island, and flowing in two different directions, so as completely to divide Sicily into two parts. It is singular that, if we may believe Vibius Sequester, this absurd notion is as old as the time of Stesichorus, who was himself a native of the city of Himera. Pomponius Mela is, however, the only one of the ancient geographers who adopts it.

The northern Himera, a much less considerable stream than the southern Himera (the Salso), is uniformly described as flowing by the city to which it gave its name; and Pindar speaks of the great victory of Gelon (which we know to have been fought in the immediate vicinity of the city) as gained upon the banks of the fair waters of the Himera. Hence its identification with the modern Imera Settentrionale (or Fiume Grande) was necessarily connected with the determination of the site of that city, a question which was the subject formerly of dispute. Theocritus more than once alludes to the river Himera as a celebrated Sicilian stream; but in such general terms as to afford no indication which of the two rivers he means: the Scholiast, however, understands him to refer to the northern Himera.
