= Salso =

River in Sicily

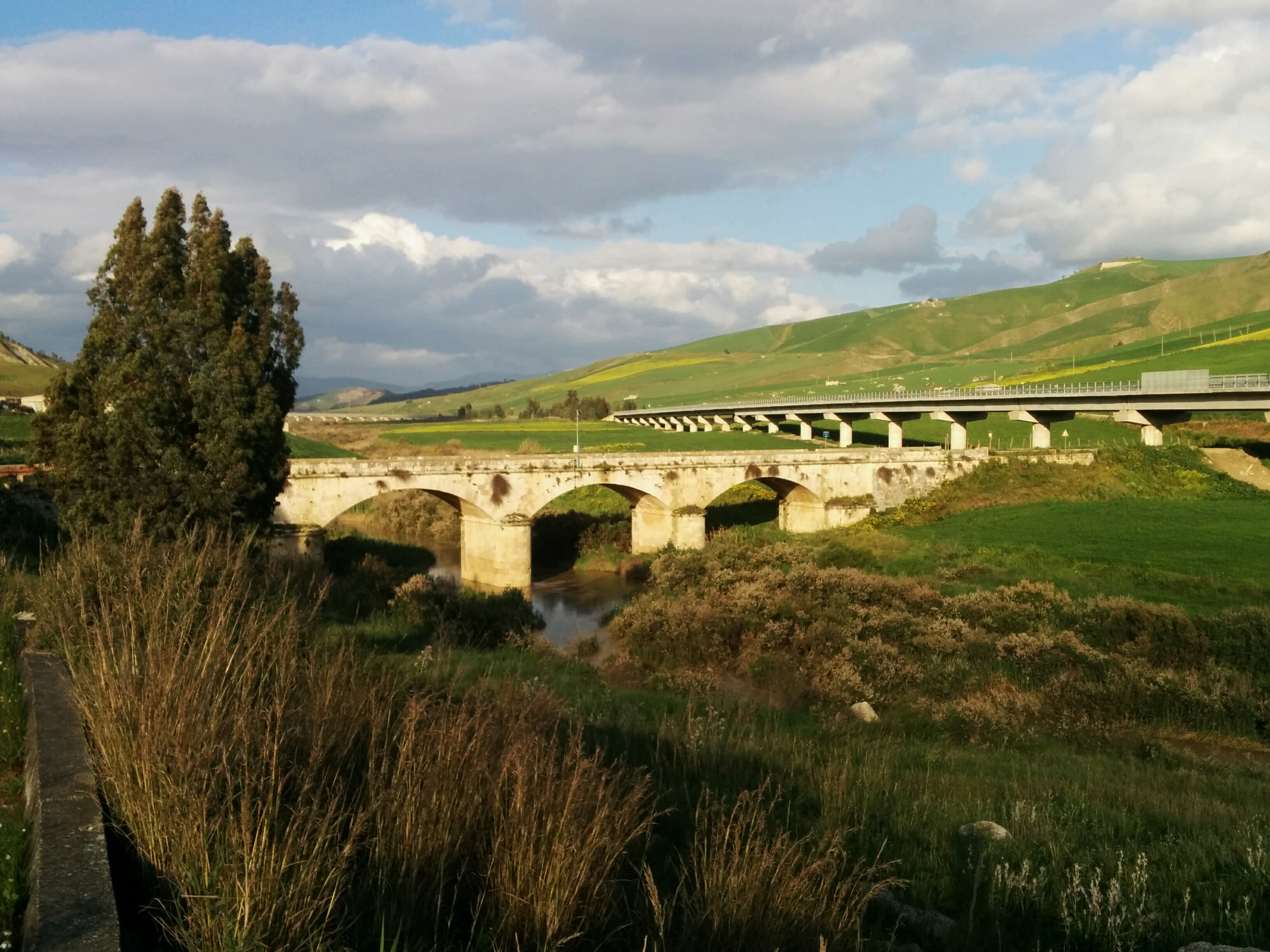

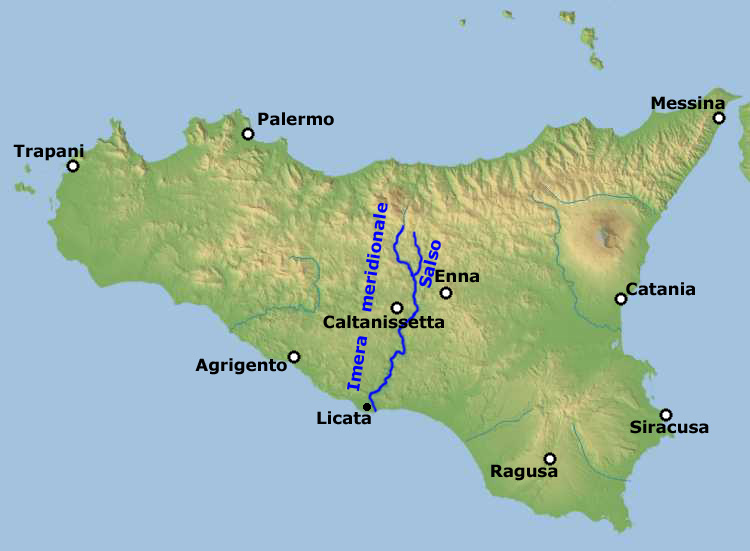

Location
- Sicily: Italy

Physical characteristics
- Mouth: Mediterranean Sea
  - coordinates: 37.1013°N 13.9471°E
- Length: 132 km (82 mi)
- Basin size: 2,022 km^{2} (781 sq mi)

The Salso (Sicilian: Salsu/Sarsu), also known as the Imera Meridionale (Greek: Ἱμέρας; Latin: Himera), is a river in Sicily, Italy. It rises in the Madonie Mountains (Sicilian: Munti Madunìi; Latin: Nebrodes Mons) and, traversing the provinces of Enna and Caltanissetta, flows into the Mediterranean at the western end of the Gulf of Gela at the seaport of Licata, in the province of Agrigento. Its small deltaic system there is dominated by marine processes rather than fluvial ones. It is a seasonal torrent, with brief but violent floods during the winter rains (from November to February), and all but dry in summer droughts. In November 1915 the iron bridge across the river's mouth collapsed during floods, and 119 people were swept away in the flood and lost. The Salso, which is the longest river of Sicily at 132 kilometres (82 mi), has a drainage basin area of 2,022 square kilometres (781 sq mi).

The river's historically changeable meanders across the low coastal plain have been artificially channeled into the Canale di Sicilia, and the marshes drained for agriculture. Until the late nineteenth century it had two distributary channels, the second debouching 5 kilometres (3 mi) to the west. The mouth of the Salso has been advancing during historical times, and wind and wave formerly distributed its sand and silt to the beaches of the Gulf of Gela.

== Historical significance ==
Himera was the ancient name of two rivers in Sicily, the Imera Settentrionale flowing to the north into the Tyrrhenian Sea, and the Salso to the south coast of the island, but which, by a strange confusion, were regarded by many ancient writers as one and the same river, which is in consequence described as rising in the center of the island, and flowing in two different directions, so as completely to divide Sicily into two parts. According to Vibius Sequester, this idea dates back to the time of Stesichorus, who was himself a native of the city of Himera. Pomponius Mela is, however, the only ancient geographer who adopts it.

The Salso enters the sea at Licata (the ancient Phintias). In the upper part of its course it is composed of two branches, running nearly parallel with one another; the one now called the Imera Settentrionale rising near Gangi, the other, called the Fiume di Petralia, from the town of the same name: it is only after the junction of the two that the river is called Salso. It is impossible to say which of the two branches was regarded by the ancients as the true Himera; but in either case that river has a course of above 90 kilometres (56 mi) from north to south, and its sources are not more than 24 kilometres (15 mi) from the north coast of the island. Hence Polybius and Livy's statement that the Himera nearly divides the whole of Sicily into two parts, is accurate. But it is evidently this circumstance, coupled with the fact that there was another river of the same name flowing into the Tyrrhenian Sea, which gave rise to the fable above noticed. Strabo, who does not mention the southern Himera, applies (evidently by mistake) very nearly the same words as Polybius to the northern river of the name. Ptolemy correctly places the mouth of the southern Himera to the east of Agrigento; he is the only one of the geographers who mentions both rivers of the name. Diodorus mentions the brackish quality of the waters of the Himera, which gives rise to its modern name of Fiume Salso: this is caused by the junction of a small stream near Caltanisetta, that flows from the salt mines in that vicinity. Solinus erroneously ascribes this quality to the northern Himera; while Vitruvius rightly attributes it to the southern river only.

According to Diodorus Siculus after a series of conflicts between the Siculi and the Sicani in prehistoric times, the River Salso was made the boundary between their respective territories, the Siculi dwelling to its east, the Sicani to its west. In 446 BCE, the Agrigentines were defeated by the Syracusans at the river. The river formed the eastern edge of the Carthaginian territory in Sicily from the treaty with Dionysius I in 374 BCE until it was shifted west to the Platani in 339 BCE as a result of the treaty with Timoleon. In 311 BCE, the Carthaginians won a great victory over Agathocles, the Tyrant of Syracuse near the mouth of the river, where the Carthaginians had occupied the hill of Ecnomus, while Agathocles was encamped on the east bank. Around 280 BCE, the king of Agrigento, Phintias, founded a city at the mouth of the Salso, which he named Phintias after himself, requiring all the inhabitants of Gela to relocate there. During the Second Punic War, Carthage and Hieronymus of Syracuse agreed to divide the whole of Sicily between them, so the River Himera (Salso) would have again been the boundary of their respective dominions. A battle between Marcellus and the Carthaginian forces under Hanno and Epicydes of Syracuse followed, in which the latter were defeated and driven to take shelter within the walls of Agrigento. As a result of the Roman victory the agreement between Carthage and Hieronymus was never carried into effect.

An inscription bearing the dedication "ΑΣΚΛΗΠΙΩ KAI IMEPA ΠΟΤΑΜΩ" ('To Asclepius and the Himera River'), must refer to the southern Himera (i.e., the Salso) since it was found at Caltanisetta.

The name Salso is also given to a tributary of the Simeto in eastern Sicily.
