= Antiochus of Syracuse =

Antiochus of Syracuse (Ancient Greek: Ἀντίοχος ὁ Συρακούσιος) was a Greek historian of Magna Graecia, who flourished around 420 BC. Little is known of Antiochus' life, but his works, of which only fragments remain, enjoyed a high reputation because of their accuracy. He wrote a History of Sicily from the earliest times to 424 BC, which was used by Thucydides, and the Colonizing of Italy, frequently referred to by Strabo and Dionysius of Halicarnassus. He is one of the authors (= FGrHist 555) whose fragments were collected in Felix Jacoby's Fragmente der griechischen Historiker.
