= Sicels =

Original inhabitants of Sicily

Sicily in the 6th century BC; the Sicels are referred to as Sikeloi. Their neighbors to the west were the Sicani.

The Sicels (/ˈsɪkəlz, ˈsɪsəlz/ SIK-əlz, SISS-əlz; Latin: Sicelī or Siculī) were an Indo-European tribe who inhabited eastern Sicily, their namesake, during the Iron Age. They spoke the Siculian language. After the defeat of the Sicels at the Battle of Nomae in 450 BC and the death of Sicel leader Ducetius in 440 BC, the Sicel state broke down and the Sicel culture merged into Magna Graecia.

== History ==
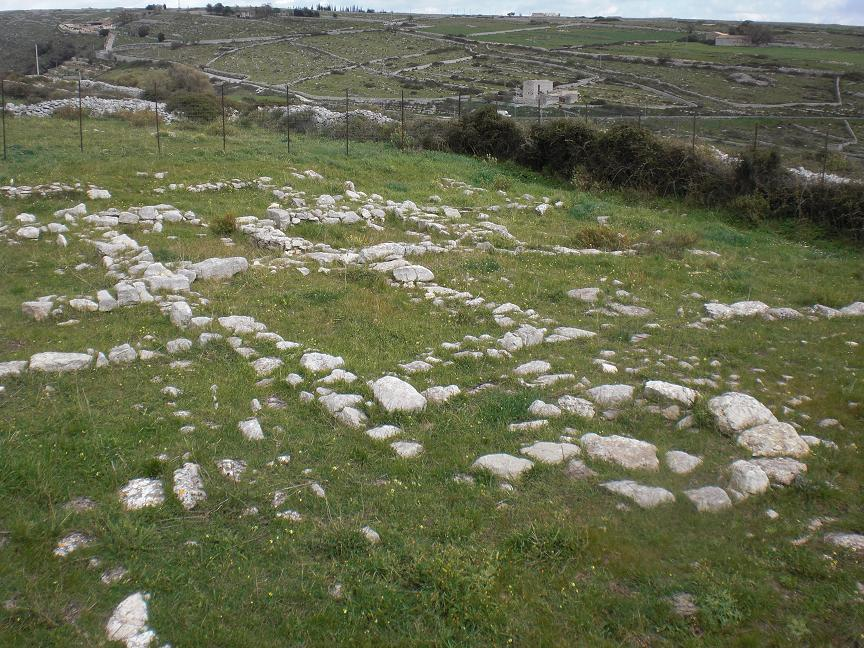
Ruins of Castiglione di Ragusa, near Ragusa, a Sicel town founded in the 7th century BC.

Archaeological excavation has shown some Mycenean influence on Bronze Age Sicily. The earliest literary mention of Sicels is in the Odyssey. Homer also mentions Sicania, but makes no distinctions: "they were (from) a faraway place and a faraway people and apparently they were one and the same" for Homer, Robin Lane Fox notes.

It is possible that the Sicels and the Sicani of the Iron Age had consisted of an Illyrian population who (as with the Messapians) had imposed themselves on a native, Pre-Indo-European ("Tyrrhenians") population. Thucydides and other classical writers were aware of the traditions according to which the Sicels had once lived in Central Italy, east and even north of Rome. Thence they were dislodged by Umbrian and Sabine tribes and finally crossed into Sicily. Their social organization appears to have been tribal, economically and agriculturally. According to Diodorus Siculus, after a series of conflicts with the Sicani, the river Salso was declared the boundary between their respective territories.

The common assumption is that the Sicels were more recent arrivals, had introduced the use of iron into Bronze Age Sicily and brought the domesticated horse. That would date their arrival on the island to the early 1st millennium BC. However, there is some evidence that the ethnonym may predate the Iron Age, based on the name Shekelesh given to one of the Sea Peoples in the Great Karnak Inscription in the 5th year of Merneptah's reign (c. 1207 BC). The name Shekelesh is also cited in a wall relief at Medinet Habu (Ramses III mortuary temple), with picture and writings describing the second invasion within a 30 years' period by the "sea peoples" in the 8th year of Ramses III's reign (1177 BC or 1186 BC, historians differ between these two dates). Eric Cline closely relates these two attacks on Egypt to the beginning of the Late Bronze Age collapse. Archaeological evidence points towards the Sicels' arrival on the island between the thirteenth and eleventh century BC.

The Sicel necropolis of Pantalica, near Syracuse, is the best known, and the second-largest one is the Necropolis of Cassibile, near Noto. Their elite tombs a forno, or oven-shaped, take the form of beehives.

The chief Sicel towns were Agyrium (Agira); Centuripa or Centuripae (Centorbi but now once again called Centuripe); Henna (later Castrogiovanni, which is a corruption of Castrum Hennae through the Arabic Qasr-janni but, since the 1920s, once again called Enna); and three sites named Hybla: Hybla Major, called Geleatis or Gereatis, on the river Symaethus; Hybla Minor, on the east coast north of Syracuse (possibly pre-dating the Dorian colony of Hyblaean Megara); and Hybla Heraea in the south of Sicily.

With the coming of Greek colonists—both Chalcidians, who maintained good relations with the Sicels, and Dorians, who did not—and the growing influence of Greek civilization, the Sicels were forced out of most of the advantageous port sites and withdrew by degrees into the hinterland. Sixty kilometres (forty miles) from the coast of the Ionian Sea, Sicels and Greeks exceptionally lived side by side in Morgantina to the extent that historians argue whether it was a Greek polis or a Sicel city. Greek goods, especially pottery, moved along natural routes, and eventually Hellenistic influences can be observed in regularised Sicel town planning. However, in the middle of the fifth century BC a Sicel leader, Ducetius, was able to create an organised Sicel state as a unitary domain in opposition to Greek Syracusa, including several cities in the central and south of the island. After a few years of independence, in 450 BC, his army was defeated by the Greeks in the Battle of Nomae and he died ten years later. Without his charisma, the movement collapsed and the increasingly Hellenized culture of the Sicels lost its distinctive character. But in the winter of 426/5 Thucydides noted the presence among the allies of Athens in the siege of Syracuse of Sicels who had "previously been allies of Syracuse, but had been harshly governed by the Syracusans and had now revolted". (Thucydides 3.103.1) Aside from Thucydides, the Greek literary sources on Sicels and other pre-Hellenic peoples of Sicily are to be found in fragmentary scattered quotes from the lost material of Hellanicus of Lesbos and Antiochus of Syracuse.

== Language ==
Linguistic studies have suggested that the Sicels may have spoken an Indo-European language and occupied eastern Sicily as well as southernmost Italy whereas the Elymi (Greek Elymoi) and Sicani (Greek: Sikanoi) inhabited western and central Sicily, respectively. It is likely that the Sicani spoke a non-Indo-European language, the classification of their language remains uncertain. Conversely, the Elymian language is generally accepted to have been an Indo-European language, though its exact classification within the family is unclear. Some consider it related to Ligurian, while others to the Italic languages.

Of the Sicel language the little that is known is derived from glosses of ancient writers and from a very few inscriptions, not all of which are demonstrably Sicel. It is thought that the Sicels did not employ writing until they were influenced by the Greek colonists. Several Sicel inscriptions have been found to date: Mendolito (Adrano), Centuripe, Poira, Paternò‑Civita, Paliké (Rocchicella di Mineo), Montagna di Ramacca, Licodia Eubea, Ragusa Ibla, Sciri Sottano, Monte Casasia, Castiglione di Ragusa, Terravecchia di Grammichele, Morgantina, Montagna di Marzo (Piazza Armerina), and Terravecchia di Cuti. The first inscription discovered, of ninety-nine Greek letters, was found on a spouted jug found in 1824 at Centuripe; it uses a Greek alphabet of the 6th or 5th century BC. It reads:

"nunustentimimarustainamiemitomestiduromnanepos duromiemtomestiveliomnedemponitantomeredesuino brtome…"

There have been various attempts at interpreting it (e.g. V. Pisani 1963, G. Radke 1996) with no sure results. Another long Sicel inscription was found in Montagna di Marzo:

"tamuraabesakedqoiaveseurumakesagepipokedlutimbe levopomanatesemaidarnakeibureitamomiaetiurela"

The best evidence for Sicel having been of Indo-European derivation is the verb form pibe "drink", a second-person singular present imperative active exactly cognate with Latin bibe (and Sanskrit piba, etc.). Membership in the Italic branch, perhaps even close to Latino-Faliscan, cannot be ruled out: Varro states that Sicel was strictly allied to Latin as many words sounded almost identical and had the same meaning, such as oncia, lytra, moeton (Lat. mutuum).

== Religion ==
Their characteristic cult of the Palici is influenced by Greek myth in the version that has survived, in which the local nymph Talia bore to Adranus, the volcanic god whom the Greeks identified with Hephaestus, twin sons, who were "twice-born" (palin "again"; ikein "to come"), born first of their nymph mother, and then of the earth, because of the "jealousy" of Hera, who urged Mother Earth, Gaia, to swallow up the nymph. Then the soil parted, giving birth to the twins, who were venerated in Sicily as patrons of navigation and of agriculture. In the most archaic level of Greek mythology, a titan, Tityos, grew so large that he split his mother's womb and had to be carried to term by Gaia herself. He came to the attention of later Greek mythographers only when he attempted to waylay Leto near Delphi. If such a mytheme is set into action as ritual, it is usual to see a pair of sacrificial children laid in the earth to encourage the green growth.

In the temple to Adranus, father of the Palici, the Sicels kept an eternal fire. A god Hybla (or goddess Hyblaea), after whom three towns were named, had a sanctuary at Hybla Gereatis. The connection of Demeter and Kore with Henna (the rape of Proserpine) and of the nymph Arethusa with Syracuse is due to Greek influence.

== See also ==
- Ancient peoples of Italy
- Ancient Italic peoples
- Italiotes
- Prehistoric Italy
- Siceliotes
- Sea Peoples
- Sicani

== Sources ==
- Thucydides, vi.2 and vi.4.6
- Price, Glanville Encyclopedia of the Languages of Europe s.v. "Sicel (Siculan)"
