= Hybla =

Hybla may refer to:

== Mythology ==
Hybla (mythology), a goddess of fertility among the ancient Sicilian people, represented on the flag of Sicily

== Places ==
=== Sicily ===
- Hybla Gereatis or Hybla Galeatis, possibly modern Paternò
- Hybla Heraea, historic quarter (Ibla) of modern Ragusa
- Hybla Major, perhaps identical with Megara Hyblaea or with Hybla Gereatis
- Hybla Minor, a Sicel site on the east coast north of Syracuse
- Megara Hyblaea, archeological site near Augusta

=== North America ===
- Hybla, Ontario, Canada
- Hybla Valley, Virginia, U.S.

== Other ==
- Hybla (leafhopper), an insect genus in the tribe Dikraneurini
- TCP Hybla, a congestion avoidance algorithm for TCP

== See also ==
- Hyblaean Mountains, south-eastern Sicily, Italy
- Hyblaeidae, a family of moths
