= Hybla Heraea =

Ancient city in Sicily

Hybla Heraea or Hybla Hera (Greek: Ὕβλα Ἡραία or Ὕβλα Ἥρα) was an ancient city of Sicily; its site is at the modern località of Ibla, in the comune of Ragusa. There were at least three (and possibly as many as five) cities named "Hybla" in ancient accounts of Sicily which are often confounded with each other, and which it is sometimes very difficult to distinguish.

== History ==
Hybla Heraea is called by Stephanus of Byzantium "Hybla the Less or Hybla the Least" (̔́̂Υβλα ἡ ἐλάττων), in distinction to Hybla Major and Hybla Minor, and surnamed Hera or Heraea (Ἥρα, Ἡραία). Of the cities of Sicily bearing the name "Hybla", it is much the least known from ancient sources. No allusion to it is found in Pausanias, where he is distinguishing Hybla Major from Hybla Minor, nor in any of the geographers: but we find in the Itineraries a town of Hybla, placed on the line of road from Syracuse to Agrigentum (modern Agrigento, which is certainly distinct from both Hybla Major and Minor (and from Megara Hyblaea and Hybla Gereatis which may equate with them), and can therefore be no other than the third Hybla of Stephanus. It was situated, according to the Itineraries, 18 miles from Acrae (modern Palazzolo). (Itin. Ant. p. 89; Tab. Peut.). A passage in which Cicero speaks of a town called "Hera", in Sicily (ad Att. ii. 1. § 5), has been thought to refer to this town; but the reading is very doubtful.

== See also ==
- List of ancient Greek cities
