= Thapsos culture =

Bronze Age culture in Sicily

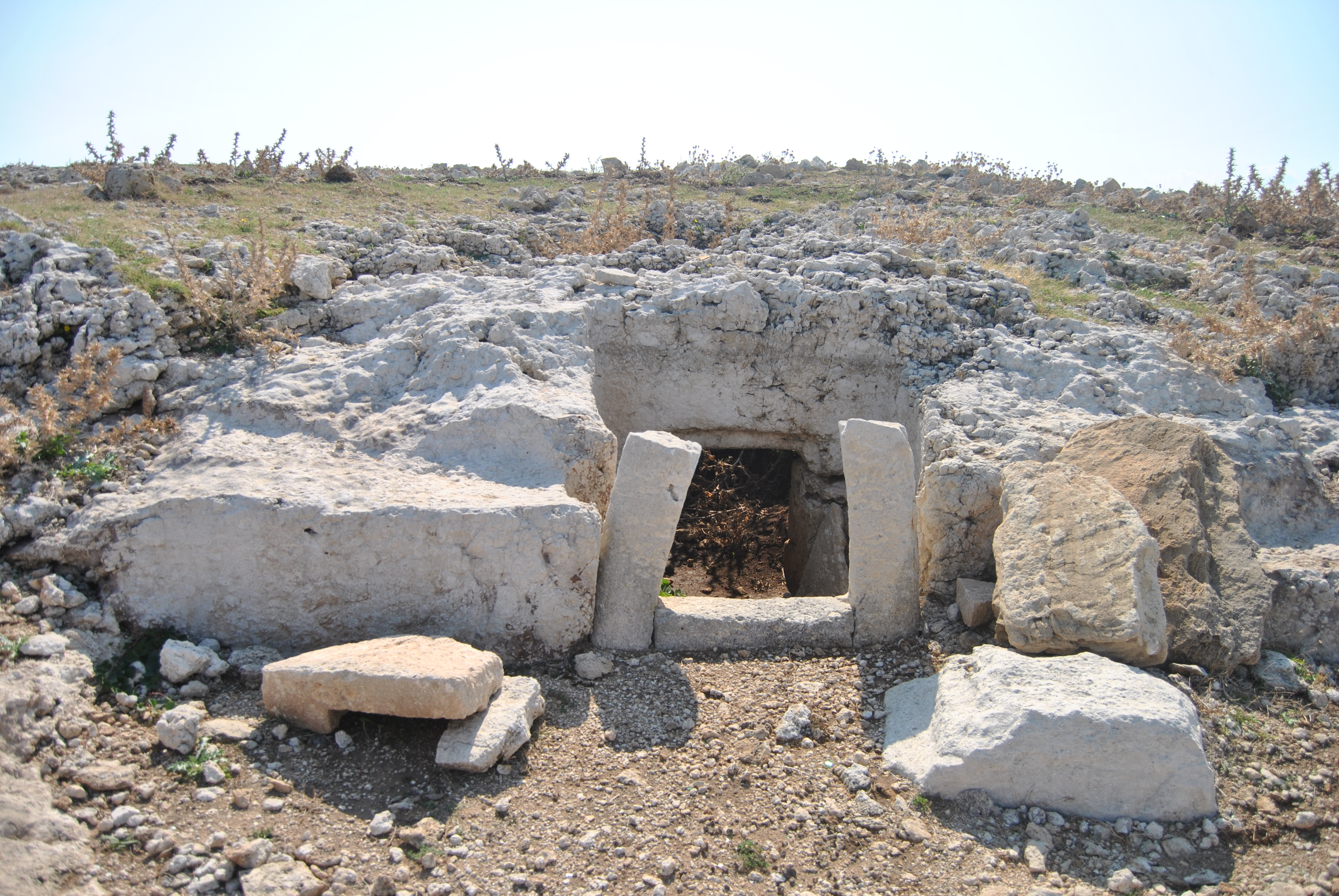
Thapsos tomb

The Thapsos Culture is defined as the civilization in ancient Sicily attested by archaeological findings of a large village located in the peninsula of Magnisi, between Augusta and Syracuse, that the Greeks called Thapsos.

I believe I have demonstrated the influence, albeit in a smaller scale of Mycenaean architecture in front of burials of the islet Magnisi; here that influence affirms for the most part. - Paolo Orsi.

== Cultural traits ==
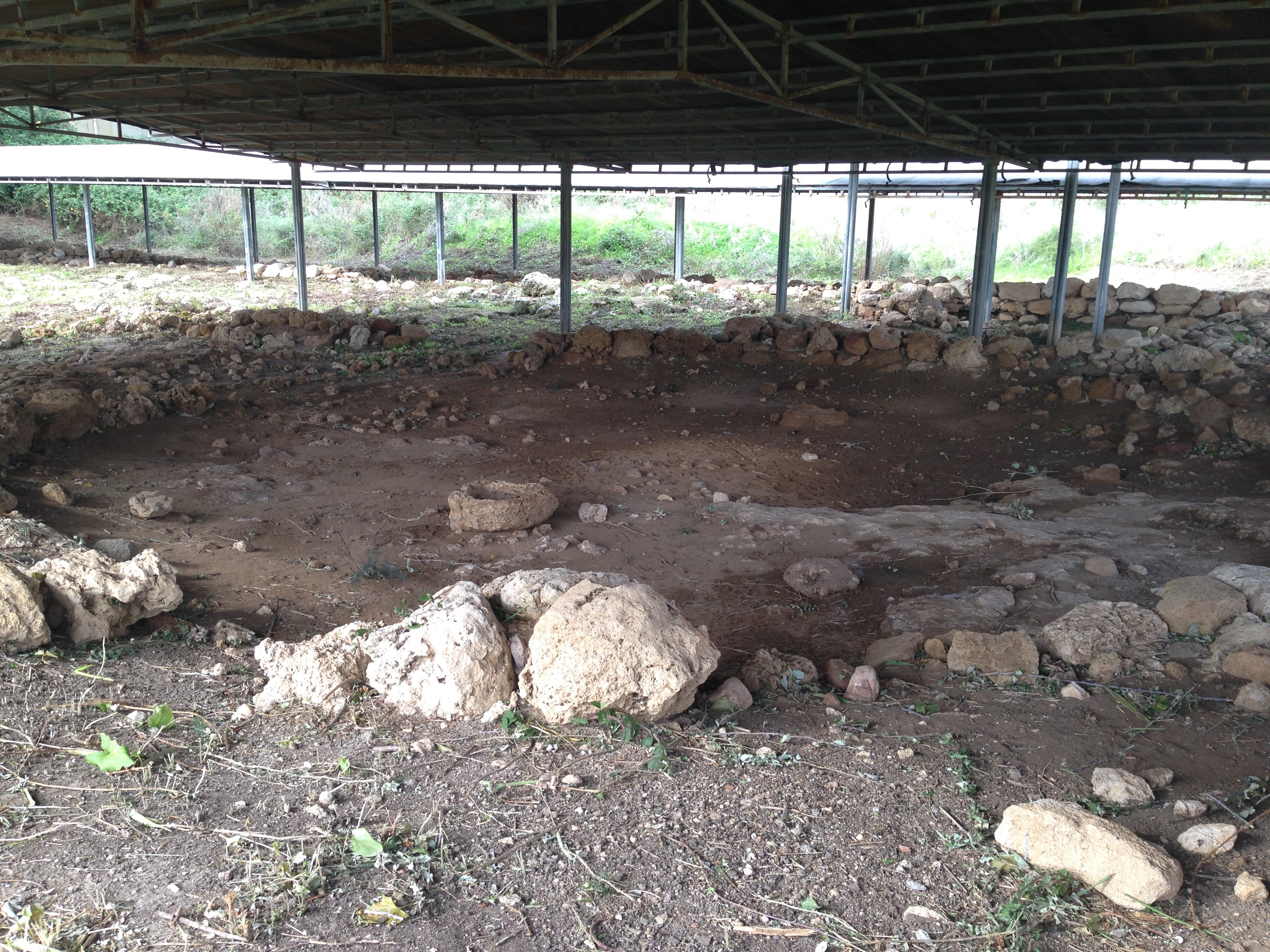
Thapsos circular hut

The Thapsos culture flourished between 1500 and 1200 BC, the local Middle Bronze Age. In the East, this culture was in contract with the Mycenaeans of the Late Helladic III.

The Thapsos Culture was the subject of great interest of scholars like Paolo Orsi and Luigi Bernabò Brea. The research of Voza have confirmed the existence of three evolutionary phases:

- Thapsos I prior to Pantalica Culture,
- Thapsos II coeval to the latter,
- Thapsos III until the end of the Bronze Age.

=== Settlements ===
The Thapsos civilization developed in the entire Sicily although the main centers, which were sometimes enclosed by a fortification wall, were along the coast. The housing, in small number, are made up of mostly circular huts bounded by stone walls. Some huts have also rectangular shape.

=== Economy and Trade ===
The economy was based on farming, herding, hunting and fishing. There are numerous evidences of trading, in particular of bronze vessels and weapons of Mycenaean production. They have established close relationships with the Milazzo Culture of the Aeolian Islands and with the Apennine culture of mainland Italy.

=== Ceramics ===
The material culture includes dark surfaced ceramic, often decorated with incised motifs or with cords that form festoons. Characteristic are the large bowls with high horn-shaped feet, bowls, jugs and cups with bifurcated handles.

Imports from Cyprus include Base Ring Ware.

=== Burial customs ===
The type of burial found in the necropolis is characterized by large rock-cut chamber tombs and often of tholos-type that some scholars believe it to be of derivation Mycenaean, while others derive it from the shape of the hut.

== See also ==
- Castelluccio Culture
- Prehistoric Italy
- Ancient peoples of Italy
