= Colonne di San Basilio =

Ancient Greek structure

Coordinates: 37.3369°N 14.8547°E

Columns of San Basilio
- Colonne di San Basilio (Italian)
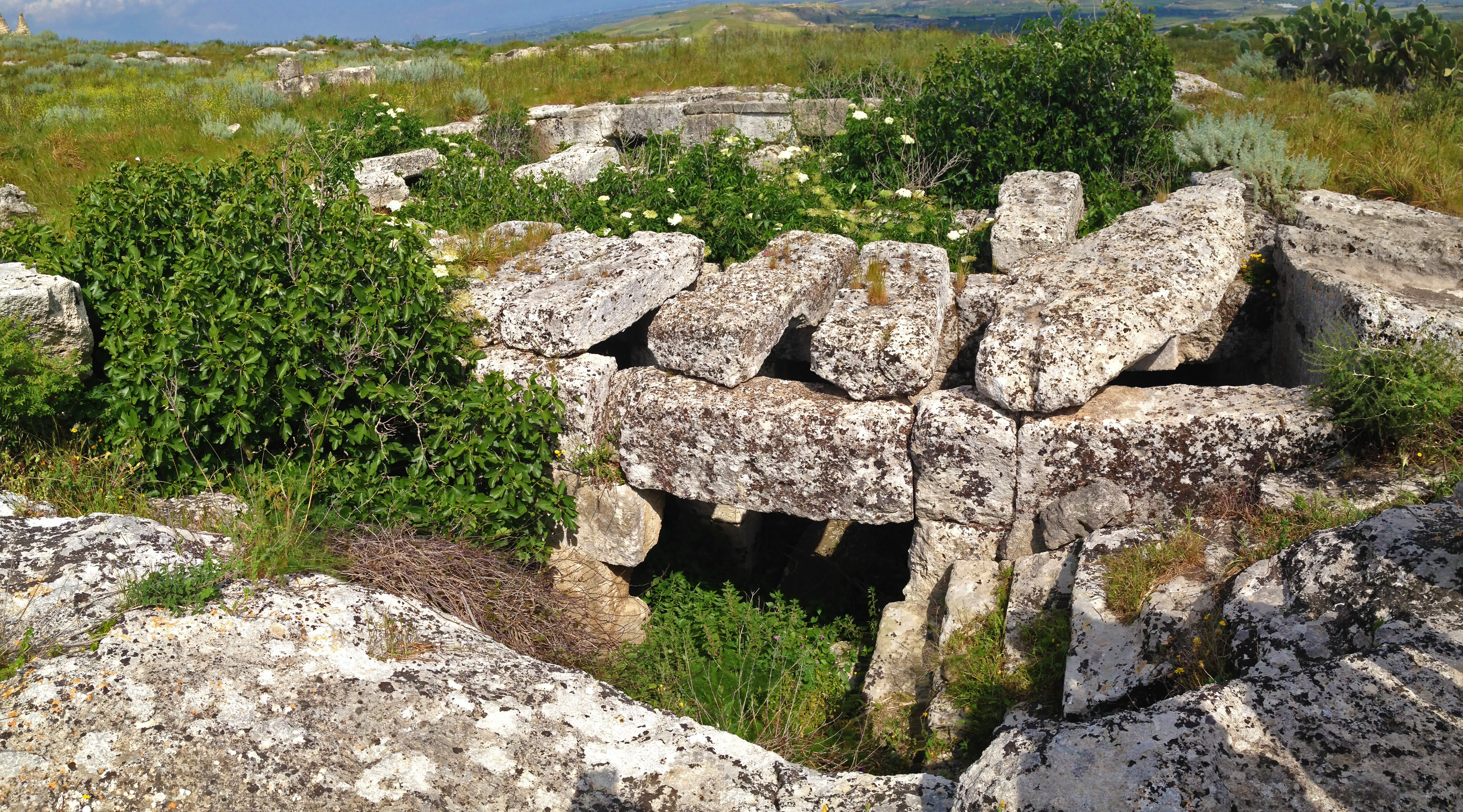
- Columns of San Basilio from the side
- Interactive map of Columns of San Basilio
- Type: cistern, church
- Cultures: Ancient Greek and Byzantine
- Location: Lentini
- Region: Sicily, Italy

Site notes
- Archaeologists: Paolo Orsi
- Public access: yes

The Colonne di San Basilio (Columns of St Basil) are an ancient Greek structure, which take their name from the mountain of San Basilio where they are located, in the territory of Lentini.

== Site ==
The summit of the mountain shows trances of ancient settlement from the prehistoric period, with clear traces of the postholes of a hut, probably belonging to the Casteluccio culture.

A little way away is the imposing structure itself, carved in the limestone rock and measuring 18 x 16 metres, with 32 columns designed to support rock slabs. Part of the structure has collapsed, but many of the columns remain standing.

The scale of the monument drew the attention of the traveller Jean-Pierre Houël who drew some sketches of it in 1777, along with some interesting written testimony:

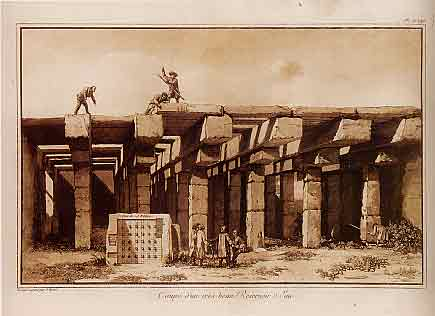
Depiction of Jean Houel

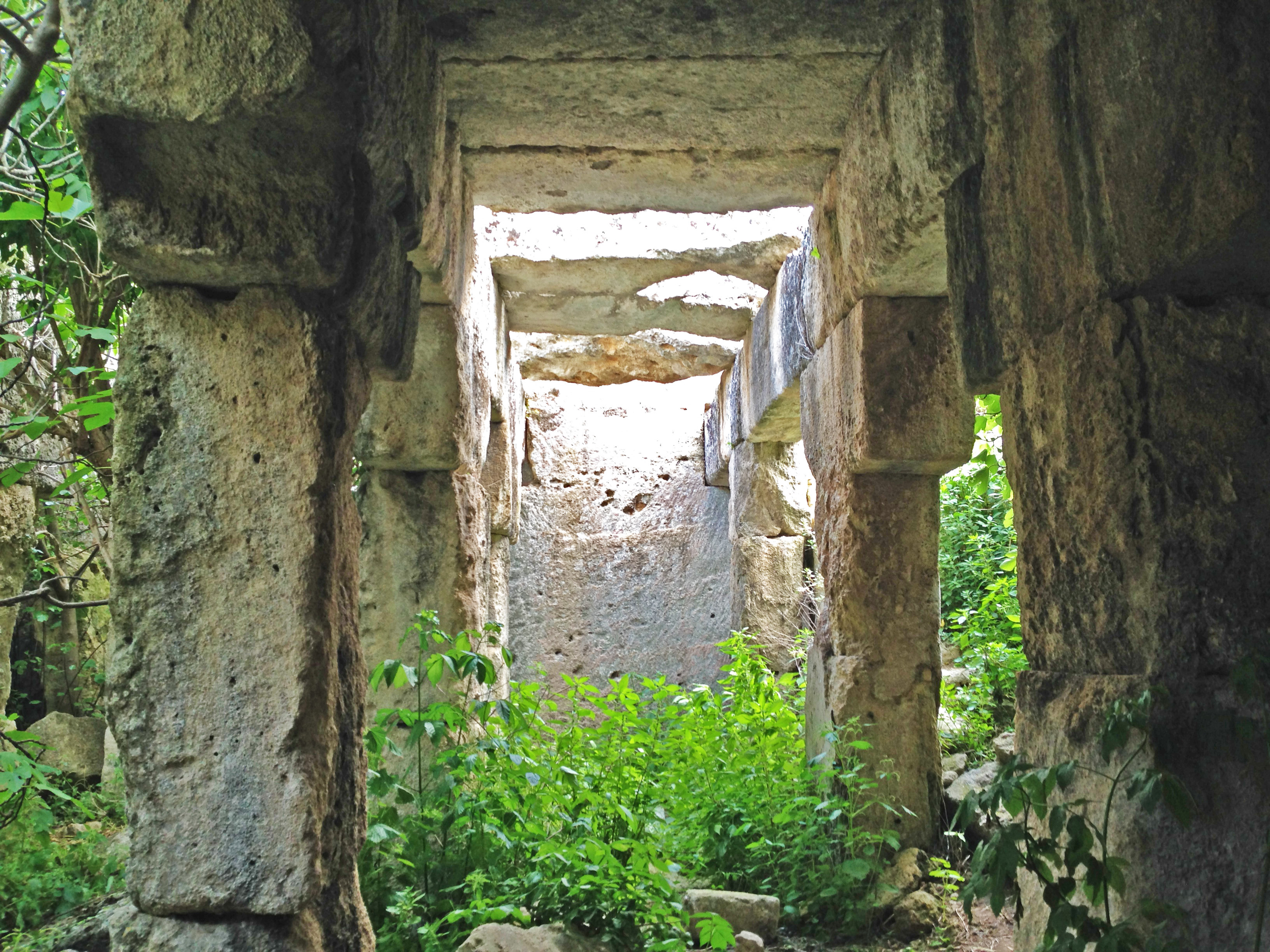
View of the columns from the right

These are the remains of a beautiful building of which nothing is known, not even the name. The collection of structures around it can be nothing other than the residences of noble and wealthy lords.

I could not represent this subterranean place (a kind of basement) except in a cut-away view. It has a square plan - see A at the bottom of the print. It is reached by descending down staircase B, which is located at the right corner, next to the pilasters which are finished with stone elements and hold up large stones. These are like beams, supporting small stones which alternate with them. Many slabs are missing and I depict the whole structure in the state of degradation in which it is seen. There is a large gate, a small version of which can be seen in the picture as well: the mass was celebrated there when devotees of Saint Basil occupied this place
I have included in the print a plan of the building with the intention of giving an exact idea of its shape and details: D is the location in which the mass was celebrated. There is a clearly visible sarcophagus in the position indicated by an E, with a curved entrance. I believe however that the sarcophagi were carved into the rock at a time after the structure served as cistern and that they were produced after the transformation into a church.
I am convinced that the structure was originally a massive cistern; but this should not astound: the ancients loved to give beautiful forms to everything they created and knew how to combine strength with good taste.

At the base of this mountain there are enormous grottos, part of which are taken up by tombs. This proves that this was the location of a city. The residences just mentioned on the summit of the mountain testify that this was the principal part of it

— Jean Houel

But it was the archaeologist Paolo Orsi who first investigated its possible functions. He theorised that it was a cistern used to supply water to soldiers present in the fortified area. The remains of fortifications of the Greek period are actually visible around the mountain, which allow one to imagine a purely military use of the site, which dominates the Plain of Catana and the city of Lentini.

The structure was later reused by the Byzantines, who converted it into a church. Some traces of religious frescoes are even visible on some of the columns, but they are not legible.

Throughout the area, various hypogeic structures of unclear purpose are visible, as well as a small temple of Demeter and Kore.

== Other theories ==
After Paolo Orsi, the site was not subject to further archaeological excavation and as a result information on it is scarce. However, a different hypothetical function has been suggested for the structure - as a granary rather than a reservoir. The site later became associated with the ancient Brikinnai mentioned by Thucydides in the History of the Peloponnesian War:

Greek
οἱ δὲ δυνατοὶ αἰσθόμενοι Συρακοσίους τε ἐπάγονται καὶ ἐκβάλλουσι τὸν δῆμον. καὶ οἱ μὲν ἐπλανήθησαν ὡς ἕκαστοι, οἱ δὲ δυνατοὶ ὁμολογήσαντες Συρακοσίοις καὶ τὴν πόλιν ἐκλιπόντες καὶ ἐρημώσαντες Συρακούσας ἐπὶ πολιτείᾳ ᾤκησαν. καὶ ὕστερον πάλιν αὐτῶν τινὲς διὰ τὸ μὴ ἀρέσκεσθαι ἀπολιπόντες ἐκ τῶν Συρακουσῶν Φωκαίας τε τῆς πόλεώς τι τῆς Λεοντίνων χωρίον καλούμενον καταλαμβάνουσι καὶ Βρικιννίας ὂν ἔρυμα ἐν τῇ Λεοντίνῃ.

Thucydides 5.4.3-4

English
But the powerful [at Leontini] learned about this [plan to redistribute the land], called in the Syracusans and expelled the populus. They had to make their own way, while the powerful made an agreement with the Syracusans, abandoned their city and left it desolate, settling with the community at Syracuse. Later some of them left Syracuse and came back because they were not happy and settled in a part of the city of Leontinoi called Phokaiai and at Brikinniai, a stronghold in Leontinoi.

However the absence of any decisive elements and of archaeological evidence prevents any certainty.

== State of the site ==
Currently the area is completely abandoned. There is no form of protection or plans to install security. Inside, the site is increasingly thick with vegetation which prevents inspection and some of the remains are in danger of collapse. There are traces of illegal excavation all across the mountain.

== Gallery ==
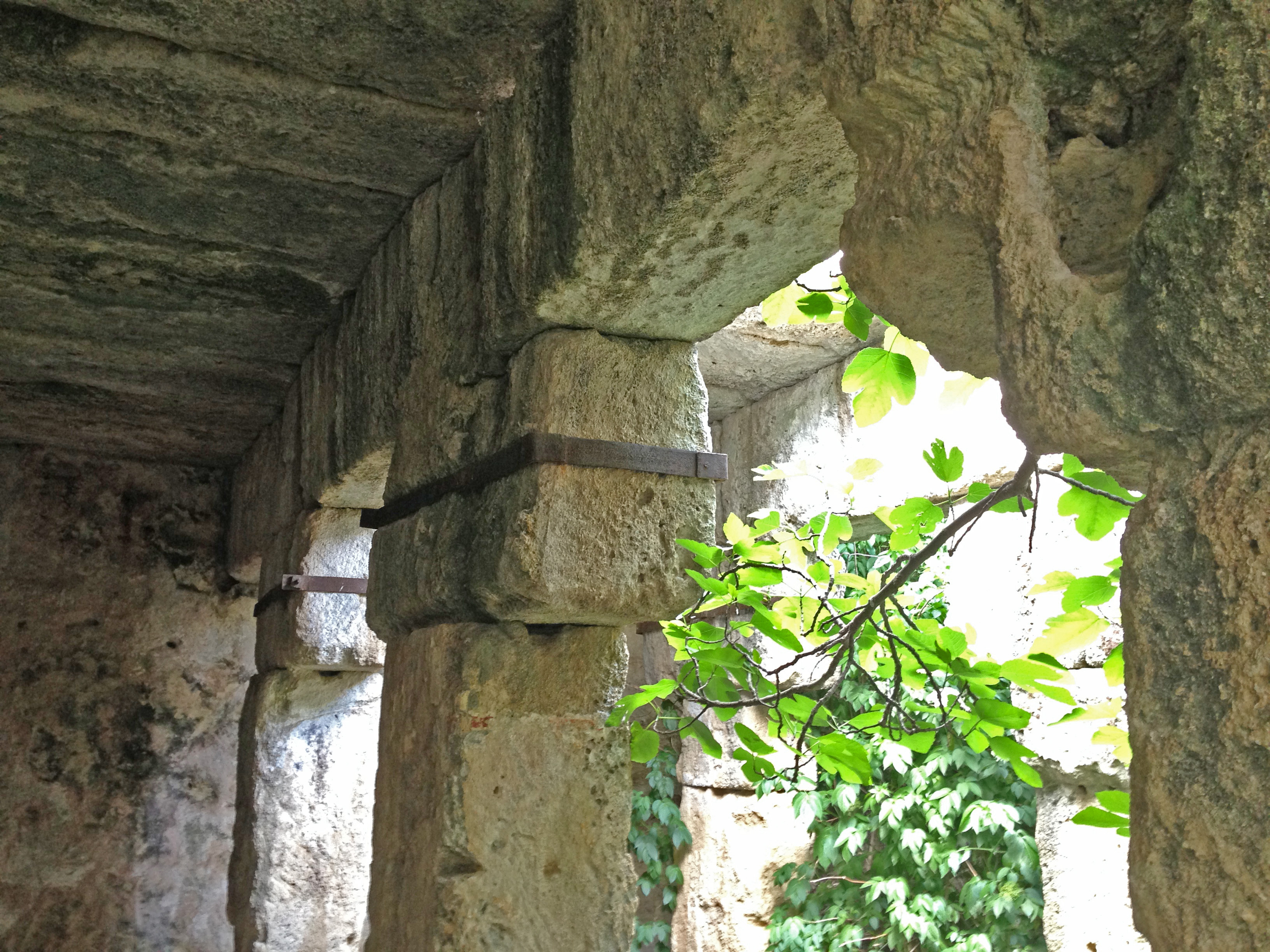
Columns and roof

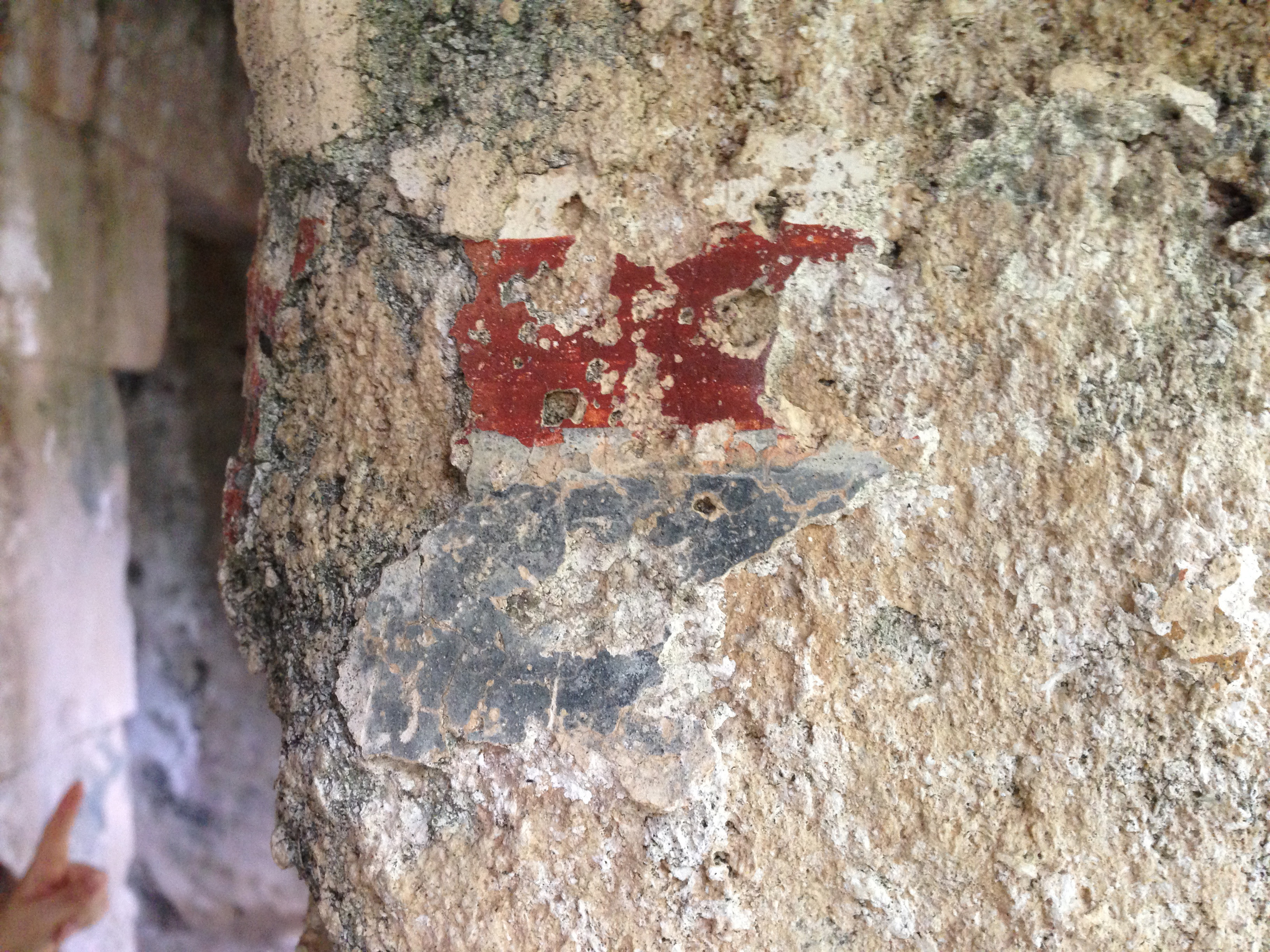
Traces of fresco on a column

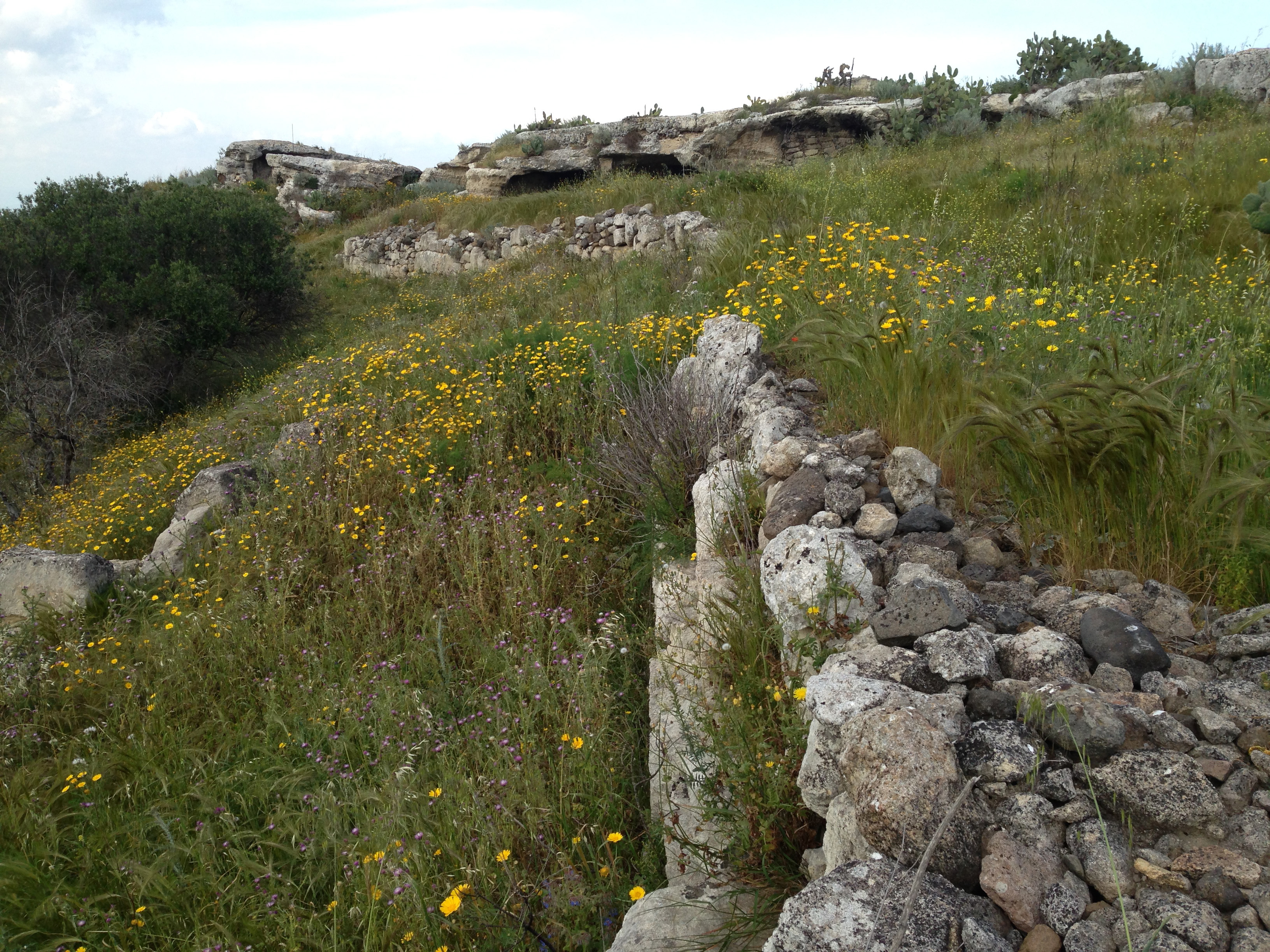
Fortifications

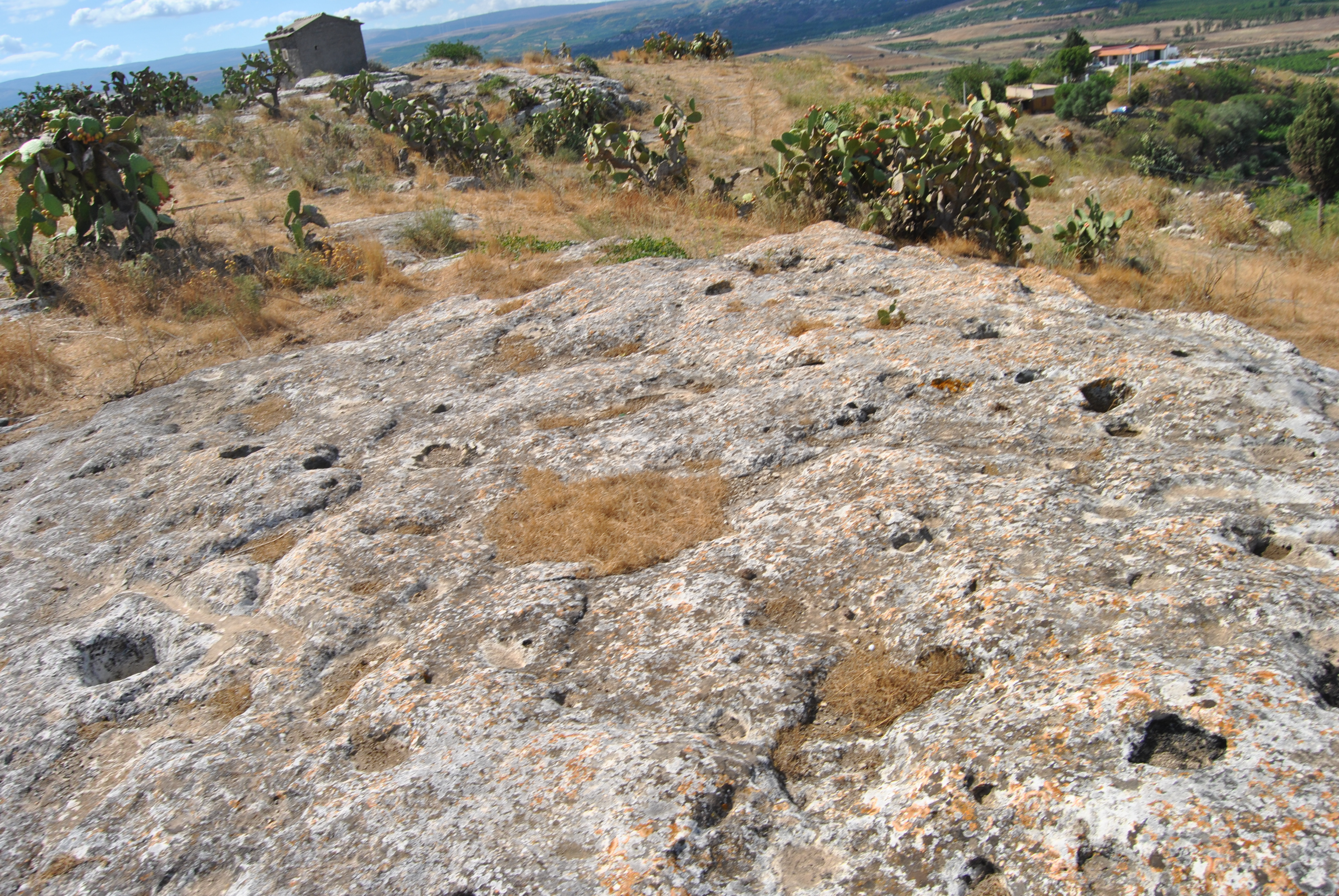
Postholes of nearby huts of the prehistoric period

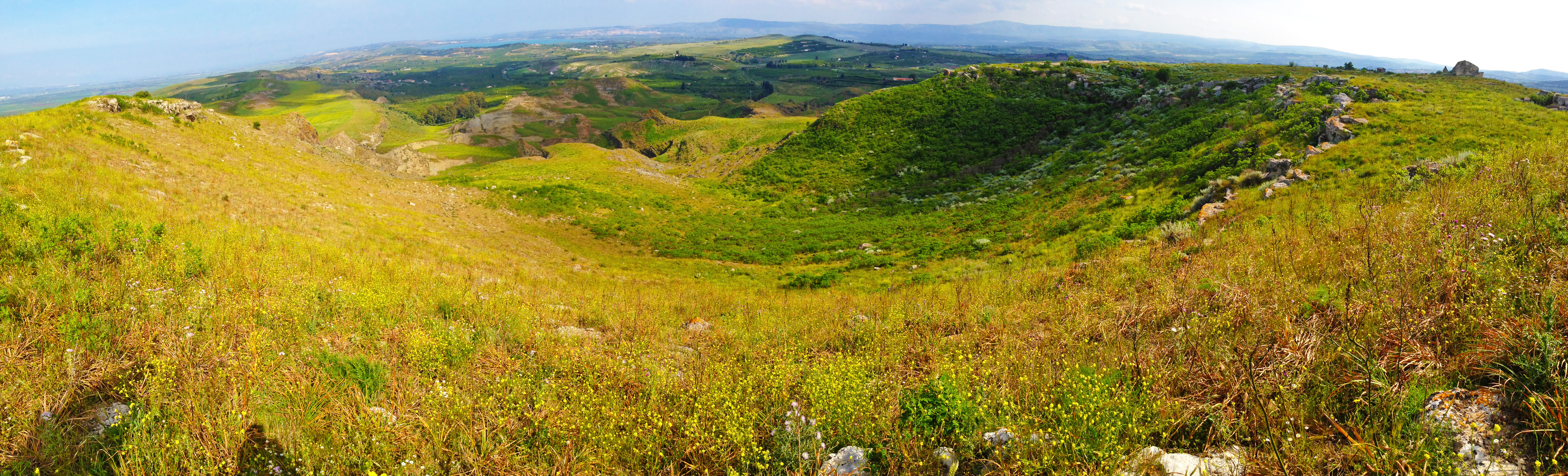
View from Mount San Basilio

== Bibliography ==
- Mario de Mauro (1861). Sul Colle di S. Basilio volgarmente detto Casale, sulla prima popolazione che vi stanziò su i monumenti e le dominazioni di Bricinnia quivi impiantata e sulle sociali vicisitudini in cui essa fu involta.
- Francesca Gringeri Pantano (2003). Jean Hoüel: voyage a Siracusa : le antichità della città e del suo territorio nel 1777. Palermo: Sellerio.
- Vito Amico (1855). Dizionario topografico della Sicilia. Tip. Pietro Morvillo. p. 131. "colonne di san basilio lentini."
