= 14th century BC =

One hundred years, from 1400 BC to 1301 BC

The 14th century BC was the century that lasted from the year 1400 BC until 1301 BC.

== Events ==
- 1350 – 1250 BC: the Bajío phase of the San Lorenzo site in Mexico; large public buildings are constructed.
- Pastoral nomadism develops in the steppes of Central Asia; cattle are watched on horseback.

=== Middle East and Africa ===
The Near East c. 1400 BC

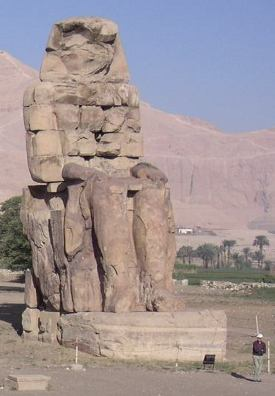
The northern Colossus of Memnon

- 1400 – 1250 BC: the heyday of the Phoenician city of Ugarit. A written alphabet is attested by Ugaritic texts.
- c. 1380 – 1336 BC: the reign of Šuppiluliuma I, who leads the Hittite Empire to its peak. Šuppiluliuma I conquers the weakened Hurrian kingdom of Mitanni in the second half of the century. Assyria is emancipated under Ashur-uballit I.
- 1375 BC: Joshua, leader of the Israelites, from the Hebrew Bible, is likely to have died around this time.
- 1372 – 1350 BC: Akhetaton (Amarna) is constructed as the ephemeral capital of the pharaoh Akhenaten and dedicated to the sun god Aten. It is abandoned a few years after Akhenaten's death.
- c. 1325 BC: Pharaoh Tutankhamun dies and is buried in a richly furnished tomb in the Valley of the Kings.
- c. 1320 – 1295 BC: the sinking of the Uluburun shipwreck in the Mediterranean Sea south of modern-day Kaş.
- Lycian pirates from southwest Anatolia raid the kingdom of Alashiya in Cyprus. They are employed as mercenaries by the Hittites and take part in the Battle of Kadesh.
- An Ugaritic patera, with its embossed decoration in concentric zones and hunting scenes, reveals an exceptional level in goldsmithing.

=== Europe ===
- c. 1400 – 1300 BC:
  - A glacial rise is attested by the peat bog of the glacier of Tyrol.
  - Phase III A of the Greek Bronze Age. Contacts with the Mycenaean civilization are established at Thapsos, Syracuse, Scoglio del Tonno in the Gulf of Taranto, and Ischia on the Tyrrhenian coast.
- 1400 – 1370 BC: phase III A1 of the Late Helladic period in Greece. Palaces are constructed in Tiryns and Pylos. Linear B, which transcribes an archaic form of Greek, appears in the palace of Knossos at the end of Phase III A1 of the Late Minoan period.
- 1370 – 1340 BC: phase III A2 of the Late Helladic period in Greece.
- 1340 – 1190 BC: phase III B of the Late Helladic period in Greece. Beehive tombs are constructed in Epirus and Thessaly, and a palace is constructed in Athens.
- 1380 – 1120 BC: a Mycenaean sanctuary is built in Phylakopi.
- c. 1370 BC: the Hagia Triada Sarcophagus is created in Crete.
- c. 1350 – 1330 BC: the reconstruction of the palace and Cyclopean enclosure at Mycenae, then at its peak under the reign of the legendary king and queen Perseus and Andromeda.
