= Aetna (city) =

Ancient Greek city of Sicily

Coordinates: 37°37′00″N 14°54′00″E

Tetradrachm

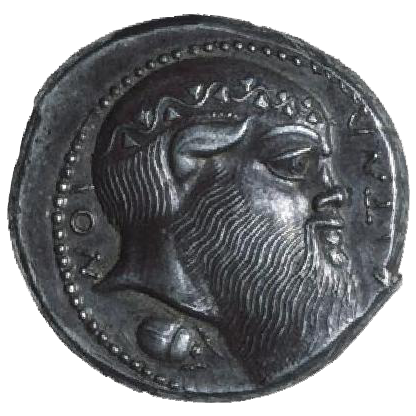
ΑΙΤΝΑΙΟΝ Head of bearded Silenus to the right; beneath, scarabaeus.

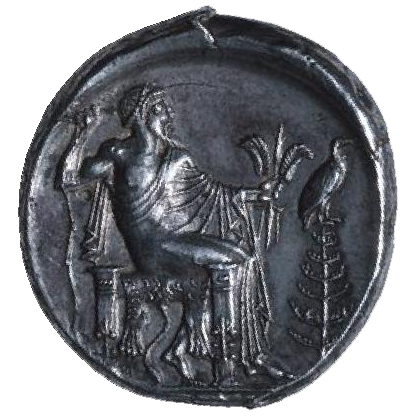
Zeus Aitnaios seated. In the field an eagle on a pine-tree

AR, unicum, Bruxelles

Aetna (Ancient Greek: Αἴτνη, Aítnē), was an ancient city of Magna Graecia in Sicily, situated at the foot of the mountain of the same name, on its southern declivity. It was originally a Sicelian city, and was called Inessa or Inessum.

== History ==
After the death of Hieron I and the expulsion of the colonists whom he had established at Catana (modern Catania), the latter withdrew to Inessa, a place of great natural strength, which they occupied, and transferred to it the name of Aetna, previously given by Hieron to his new colony at Catana. In consequence of this they continued to regard Hieron as their oekist or founder. The new name, however, appears not to have been universally adopted, and we find Thucydides at a later period still employing the old appellation of Inessa. It seems to have fallen into the power of the Syracusans, and was occupied by them with a strong garrison; and in 426 BC, during the Sicilian Expedition, we find the Athenians under Laches in vain attempting to wrest it from their hands. During the great Athenian expedition, Inessa, as well as the neighbouring city of Hybla, continued steadfast in the alliance of Syracuse, on which account their lands were ravaged by the Athenians.

At a subsequent period the strength of its position as a fortress, rendered it a place of importance in the civil dissensions of Sicily, and it became the refuge of the Syracusan knights who had opposed the elevation of Dionysius the Elder. But in 403 BC, that despot made himself master of Aetna, where he soon after established a body of Campanian mercenaries, who had previously been settled at Catana. These continued faithful to Dionysius, notwithstanding the general defection of his allies, during the Carthaginian invasion in 396 BC, and retained possession of the city until 339 BC, when it was taken by Timoleon, and its Campanian occupants put to the sword. We find no mention of it from this time until the days of Cicero, who repeatedly speaks of it as a municipal town of considerable importance; its territory being one of the most fertile in corn of all Sicily. Its citizens suffered severely from the exactions of Verres and his agents. The Aetnenses are also mentioned by Pliny among the populi stipendiarii of Sicily; and the name of the city is found both in Ptolemy and the Itineraries, but its subsequent history and the period of its destruction are unknown.

== Location ==
Some doubt exists as to the site of Aetna. Strabo writes that it was near Centuripe, and was the place from whence travellers usually ascended the mountain. But in another passage he expressly says that it was only 80 stadia from Catana. The Antonine Itinerary places it at 12 M. P. from Catana, and the same distance from Centuripi; its position between these two cities is further confirmed by Thucydides. But notwithstanding these unusually precise data, its exact situation cannot be fixed with certainty.

Sicilian antiquaries generally place it at Santa Maria di Licodia, which agrees well with the strong position of the city, but is certainly too distant from Catana. On the other hand, San Nicolo dell'Arena, a convent just above Nicolosi, which is regarded by Cluverius as the site, is too high up the mountain to have ever been on the high road from Catana to Centuripi. Mannert, however, speaks of ruins at a place called Castro, about 4 km northeast from Paternò, on a hill projecting from the foot of the mountain, which he regards as the site of Aetna, and which would certainly agree well with the requisite conditions. This latter position is the consensus of most modern scholars.

== Coinage ==
There exist coins of Aetna in considerable numbers, but principally of copper; they bear the name of the people at full, ΑΙΤΝΑΙΩΝ. Those of silver, which are very rare, are similar to some of Catana, but bear only the abbreviated legend AITN.
