= Paolo Orsi =

Italian archeologist

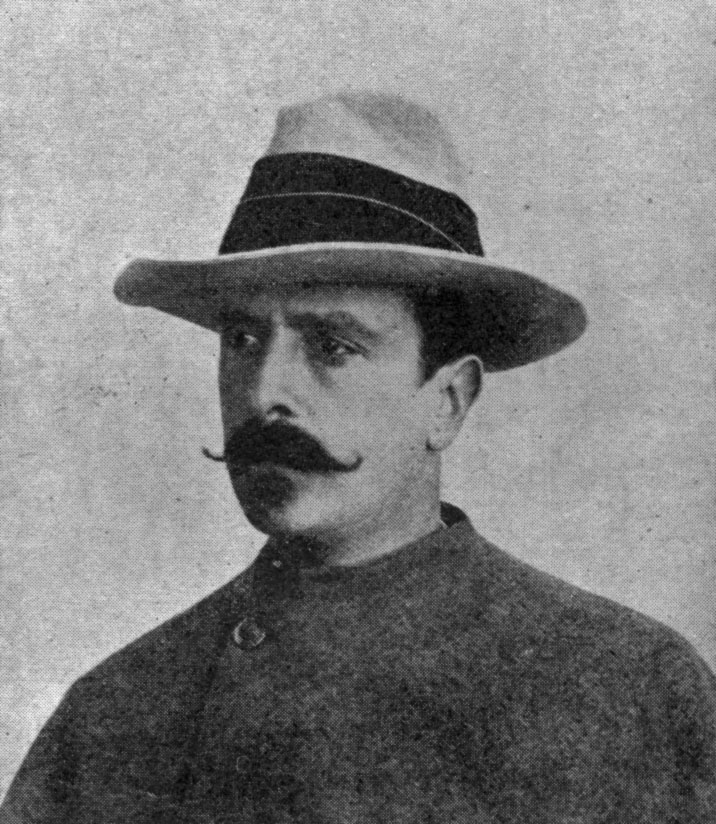
Paolo Orsi

Paolo Orsi (Rovereto, October 17, 1859 – November 8, 1935) was an Italian archaeologist and classicist.

== Life ==
Orsi was born in Rovereto, then part of the Austro-Hungarian Empire and now in the province of Trento in Italy. After studying at a gymnasium in Rovereto, Orsi moved to Vienna to study ancient history and archaeology. Continuing his studies at the University of Padua and graduating in Rome, he next studied at Rome's Reale scuola italiana di Archeologia (Italian School of Archaeology), Bologna's school of classical art, and Rome's school of palaeontology.

Refusing offers of several university posts, Orsi decided to concentrate on field research and publications. During his studies, he discovered the prehistoric zone of Colombo at Mori in Trentino. After a brief period in a teaching post at Alatri, he took a position at the general directorate of antiquities and fine arts, and then the Biblioteca nazionale centrale di Firenze (National Central Library of Florence).

In 1890 Orsi won a competition to become inspector of excavations and museums. He was invited to Syracuse, where he devoted himself to studying the origins of the Sicani and Sicels, and of the cities of Thapsos and Megara Hyblaea. In his work on the monti Iblei and the valley leading to the sea, he discovered temples, necropolises, walls, palaces, coins and other remains of the ancient city of Casmene. He wrote an interpretation of the architecture of the Basilica di San Foca at Priolo. As commissioner of the Museo Nazionale di Napoli for a short time (1900 - 1901), Orsi still left an indelible mark. He laid the foundations for the museum's global re-organization (brought to fruition under its next director Ettore Pais) and identification of ten major collections of materials.

In 1907 Orsi transferred to Reggio Calabria, where he became director of the Sovraintendenza Calabra per gli Scavi. He contributed to the founding of the Museo Nazionale della Magna Grecia. He worked at Reggio, Locri and Rossano Calabro, where he continued his studies of Magna Grecia. In city excavations he found an Ionic temple, ancient walls, and the sites of Medma and Krimisa. In 1924 he was appointed a senator of the Kingdom of Italy and returned to Sicily. Although he refused a university chair, Orsi continued to work with the Syracuse museum (which now bears his name) in his retirement.

He wrote more than 300 works, for which he won the Gran Premio di Archeologia dell'Accademia dei Lincei. His preferred areas were Syracuse, Calabria, Rovereto and South Tyrol. He was one of the founders of the Società Italiana di Archeologia in 1909. Students in Vienna long studied his works on Trentino alongside those of Federico Halbherr. The annual Rassegna del cinema archeologico (held at the Museo Civico di Rovereto and for a couple of years at Reggio Calabria) was dedicated to Orsi and Halbherr.
