= Megara Hyblaea =

City of ancient Sicily and Italian archaeological site

- τὰ Μέγαρα (Ancient Greek)
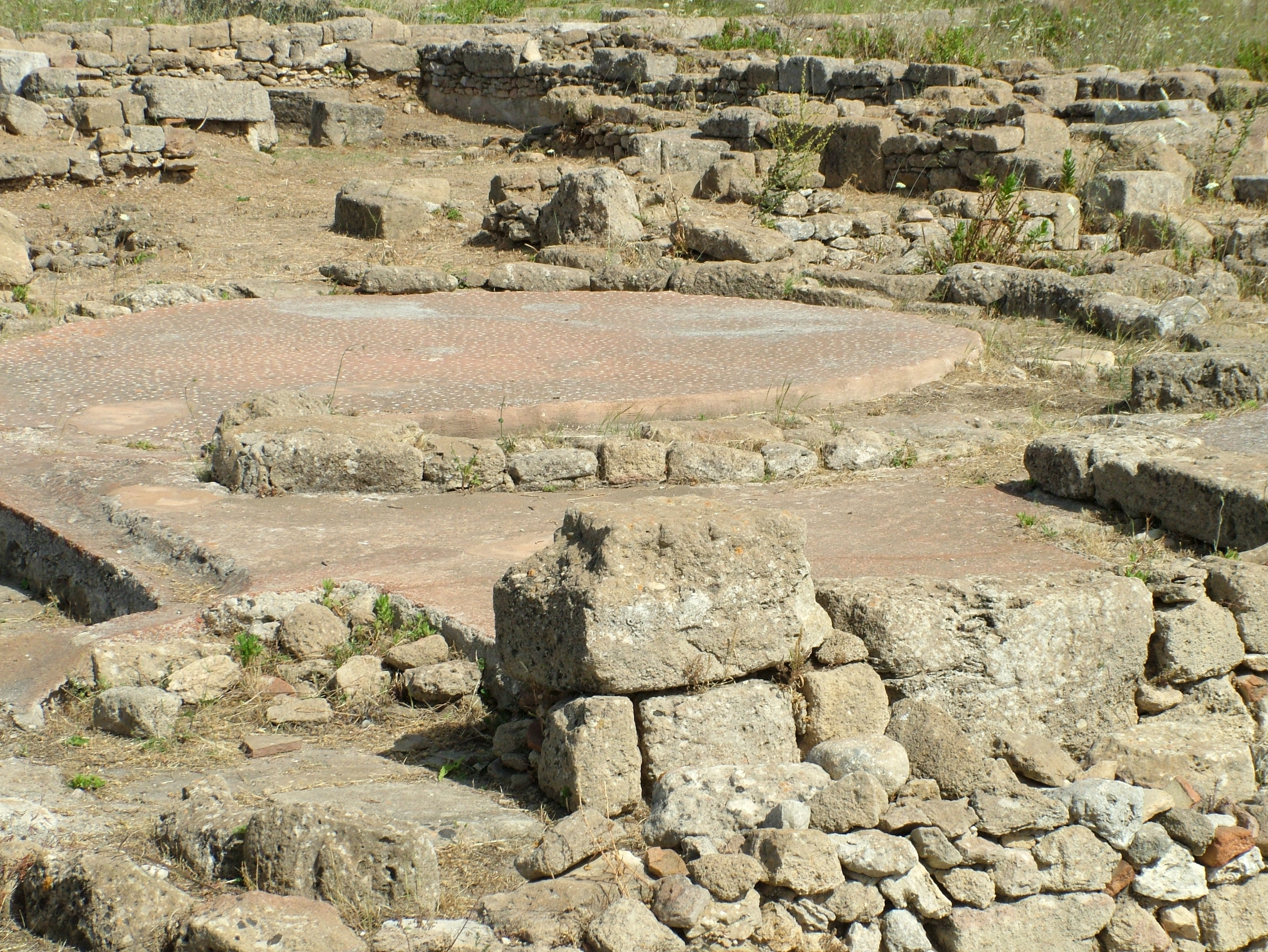
- Mosaics on the floor of a house near the western gate of Megara Hyblaea.

- Location within Italy
- 37°12′14.04″N 15°10′54.84″E
- Type: Settlement
- Periods: Archaic Greek
- Cultures: Greek
- Location: Augusta, Sicily, Italy
- Region: Sicily

History
- Built: 8th century BC
- Built by: Greek settlers from Megara
- Abandoned: Approximately 483 BC

Site notes
- Excavation dates: 1891
- Condition: Ruined
- Owner: Public
- Management: Soprintendenza per i Beni Culturali ed Ambientali di Siracusa
- Public access: Yes

Megara Hyblaea (Ancient Greek: Μέγαρα Ὑβλαία) – perhaps identical with Hybla Major – is an ancient Greek colony of Magna Graecia in Sicily, situated near Augusta on the east coast, 20 kilometres (12 mi) north-northwest of Syracuse, Italy, on the deep bay formed by the Xiphonian promontory. There were at least three (and possibly as many as five) cities named "Hybla" in ancient accounts of Sicily which are often confounded with each other, and among which it is sometimes very difficult to distinguish.

== History ==
It was unquestionably a Greek colony, deriving its origin from the Megara in Greece; and the circumstances attending its foundation are related in detail by Thucydides. He tells us that a colony from Megara, under the command of a leader named Lamis (Ancient Greek: Λάμις), arrived in Sicily about the time that Leontini was founded by the Chalcidic colonists, and settled themselves first near the mouth of the river Pantagias, at a place called Trotilon (Latin: Trotilus, modern Brucoli). From there they removed to Leontini itself, where they dwelt for a time together with the Chalcidians; but were soon afterwards expelled by them, and next established themselves on the promontory or peninsula of Thapsos (Latin: Thapsus, modern Magnisi), near Syracuse. They again relocated after the death of Lamis, and, at the suggestion of Hyblon, a Sicilian chief of the surrounding country, finally settled at a place afterwards called the Hyblaean Megara. (Thuc. vi. 4.) Scymnus of Chios follows a different tradition, as he describes the establishment of the Chalcidians at Naxos and that of the Megarians at Hybla as contemporary, and both preceding the foundation of Syracuse, 734 BC. Strabo also adopts the same view, representing Megara as founded about the same time with Naxos (735 BC), and before Syracuse. (Scymn. Ch. 271-76; Strab. vi. p. 269.) It is impossible to reconcile the two accounts, but that of Thucydides is probably the most trustworthy. Thus the foundation of Megara may be placed about 726 BC. Professor Miller, in her reinvestigation of ancient source materials has determined that they point to various dates of foundation from 758 BC (per the Chronikon of Eusebius) to 728 BC (from her reconstructions of dates from Thucydides). Of its earlier history we have scarcely any information, but it would appear to have attained a flourishing condition, as 100 years after its foundation it sent out, in its turn, a colony to the other end of Sicily, where it founded the city of Selinus, which was destined to rise to far greater power than its parent city. (Thuc. vi. 4; Scymn. Ch. 291; Strab. vi. p. 272.)

Nothing more is known of Megara till the period of its destruction by Gelon of Syracuse, about 483 BC, who, after a long siege, made himself master of the city by a capitulation; but, notwithstanding this, caused the bulk of the inhabitants to be sold into slavery, while he established the more wealthy and noble citizens at Syracuse. (Herod. vii. 156; Thuc. vi. 4.) Among the persons thus removed was the celebrated comic poet Epicharmus, who had received his education at Megara, though not a native of that city. (Suda, under Ἐπίχαρμος; Diogenes Laërtius viii. 3.) According to Thucydides, this event took place 245 years after the foundation of Megara, and may therefore be placed about 483 BC. It is certain that Megara never recovered its power and independence. Thucydides distinctly alludes to it as not existing in his time as a city, but repeatedly mentions the locality, on the sea-coast, which was at that time occupied by the Syracusans, but which the Athenian general Lamachus, during the expedition against Syracuse (415–413 BC), proposed to make the headquarters of their fleet; his advice was not taken, and the next spring the Syracusans fortified it. (Thuc. vi. 49, 96.)

From this time we meet with repeated mention of a place named Megara or Megaris (Scyl. p. 4. § 6), which it seems impossible to separate from Hybla, and it is probable that the two were, in fact, identical. The site of this later Megara or Hybla may be fixed, with little doubt, at the mouth of the river Alabus (modern Cantera); but there seems much reason to suppose that the ancient city, the original Greek colony, was situated close to the remarkable promontory now occupied by the city of Augusta. It is difficult to believe that this position, the port of which is at least equal to that of Syracuse, while the peninsula itself has the same advantages as that of Ortygia, should have been wholly neglected in ancient times; and such a station would have admirably served the purposes for which Lamachus urged upon his brother generals the occupation of the vacant site of Megara (Thuc. vi. 49.).

== Archaeology ==
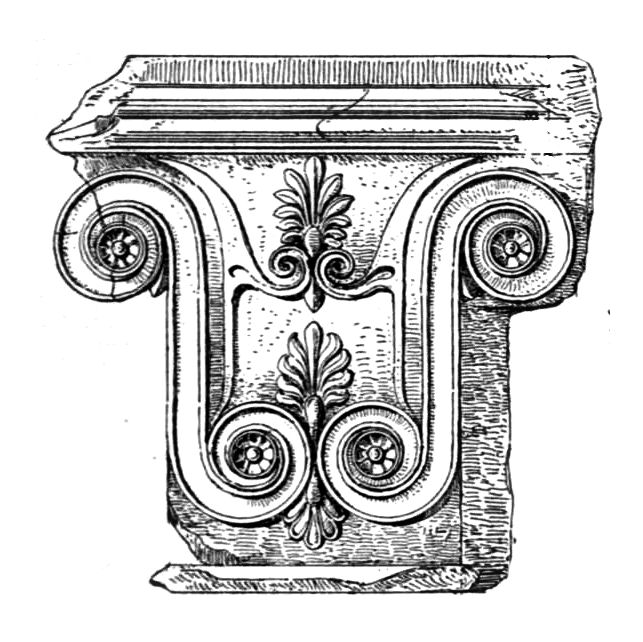
Pilaster capital from Megara Hyblaea with palmettes between volutes. 5th century BCE.

Excavations carried on in 1891 led to the discovery of the northern portion of the western town wall, which in one section served at the same time as an embankment against floods—it was apparently more conspicuous in the time of Philipp Cluver, (Sicilia antiqua, Leiden, 1619) p. 133—of an extensive necropolis, about 1500 tombs of which have been explored, and of a deposit of votive objects from a temple. The harbour lay to the north of the town.

In the mid-seventh century, the city was organised according to a regularised plan. An agora emerged with stoas on its north and eastern sides. This is one of the earliest known agoras.
