= Hybla Gereatis =

Ancient city of Magna Graecia in Sicily

Coordinates: 37.5667°N 14.9000°E

Hybla Gereatis (Greek: Ὕβλα ἡ Γελεᾶτις), was an ancient city of Magna Graecia in Sicily, located on the southern slope of Mount Etna, not far from the river Symaethus, in the modern comune of Paternò. There were at least three (and possibly as many as five) cities named "Hybla" in ancient accounts of Sicily which are often confounded with each other, and which it is sometimes very difficult to distinguish.

Hybla Gereatis has been described as the largest and most considerable of the Sicilian cities called Hybla, thence equated with Hybla Major or Magna.

Pausanias (in whose time it had ceased to be an independent city) described the city as situated in the territory of Catana (modern Catania). In like manner, we find it noticed by Thucydides as a place between Catana and Centuripa (modern Centuripe), so that the Athenians, on their return from an expedition to the latter city, ravaged the corn fields of the Inessaeans and Hyblaeans. It was clearly a Siculian city; and hence, at an earlier period, it is mentioned among the other towns of that people in the interior of the island which Ducetius sought to unite into a common league, a measure to which the Hyblaeans alone refused to accede. It is quite clear that, in all the above passages, the Aetnaean Hybla is the one meant: and it seems probable that the city of Hybla, which was attacked by the Athenians soon after their landing in Sicily (Thuc. vi. 62), but without success, was no other, but only Thucydides distinguishes the Hybla as Hybla Geleatis (Ὕβλα ἡ Γελεᾶτις)

During the Second Punic War, Livy mentions Hybla as one of the towns that were induced to revolt to the Carthaginians in 211 BCE, but were quickly recovered by the Roman praetor M. Cornelius. In the time of Cicero the Hyblenses (evidently the people of the Aetnaean city) appear as a considerable municipal community, with a territory fertile in corn: and Hybla is one of the few places in the interior of Sicily which Pomponius Mela thinks worthy of mention. Its name is also found both in Pliny, who reckons it among the populi stipendiarii of the island, and in Ptolemy. Hence it is strange that Pausanias appears to speak of it as in his time utterly desolate. The passage, however, is altogether so confused that it is very difficult to say of which Hybla he is there speaking. We find no later notice of it, though an inscription of Christian times found at Catana appears to refer to Hybla as still existing under its ancient name.

The site, as suggested by Cluverius, at Paternò (about 20 km from Catania), and derives strong confirmation from the discovery in that city of an altar dedicated Veneri Victrici Hyblensi. There is much confounding of this city with that of Aetna.

== See also ==
- List of ancient Greek cities
