= Thapsos =

Prehistoric village in Sicily

- Θάψος (Greek)
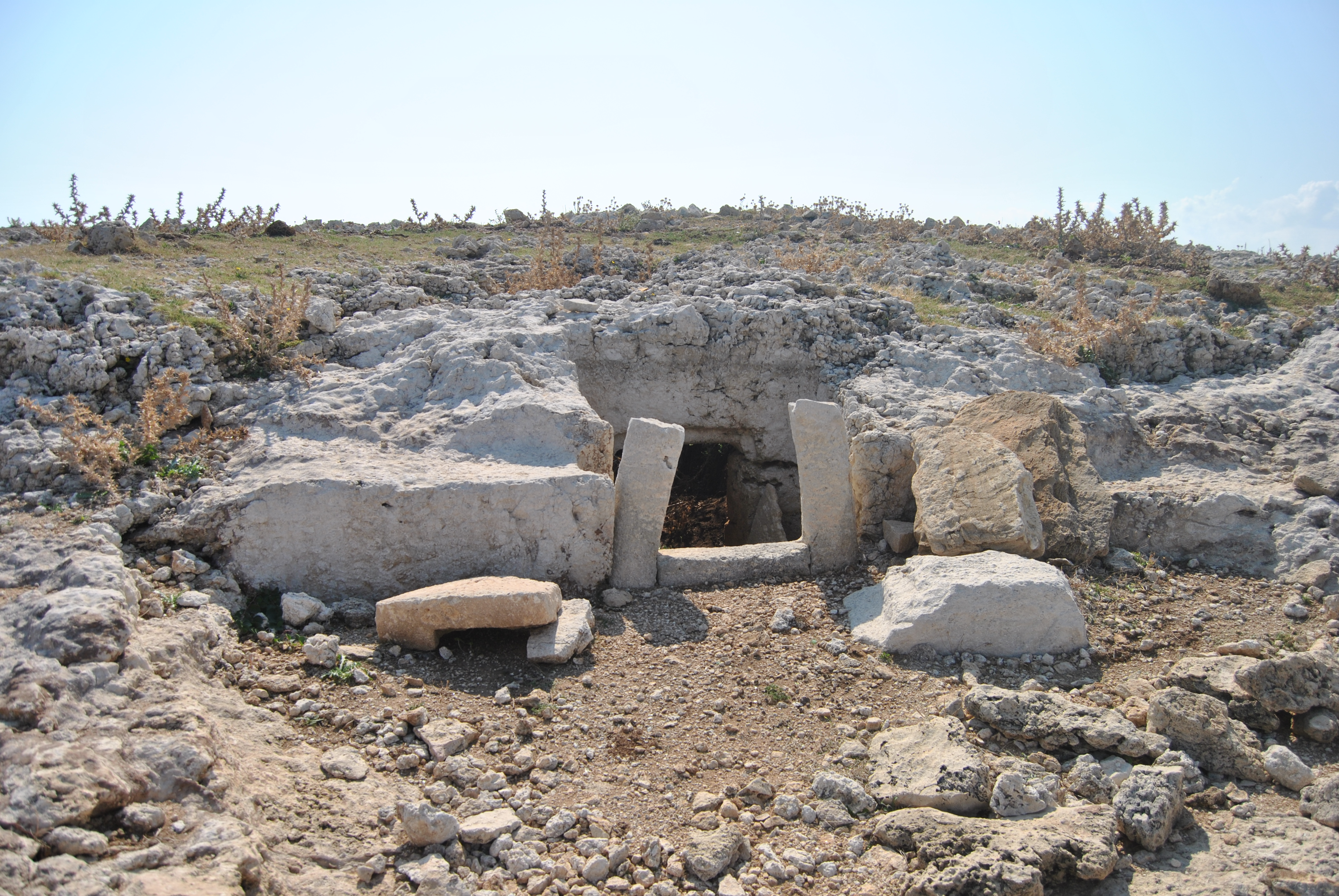
- Thapsos had a large necropolis of cave tombs with vertical entrance shafts or dromos entry-corridors.

- Location within Italy
- 37°09′13″N 15°13′46″E
- Type: Settlement
- Location: Priolo Gargallo, Province of Syracuse, Sicily, Italy

Site notes
- Condition: Ruined
- Owner: Public
- Management: Soprintendenza BB.CC.AA. di Siracusa
- Public access: Yes
- Website: Museo Archeologico Regionale Paolo Orsi

Thapsos (Greek: Θάψος) was a prehistoric village in Sicily of the middle Bronze Age. It was found by the Italian archaeologist Paolo Orsi on the small peninsula of Magnisi, near Priolo Gargallo. In its vicinity was born the Thapsos culture, one of the most important prehistoric cultures in Sicily (identified with the people of Sicani).

== History ==
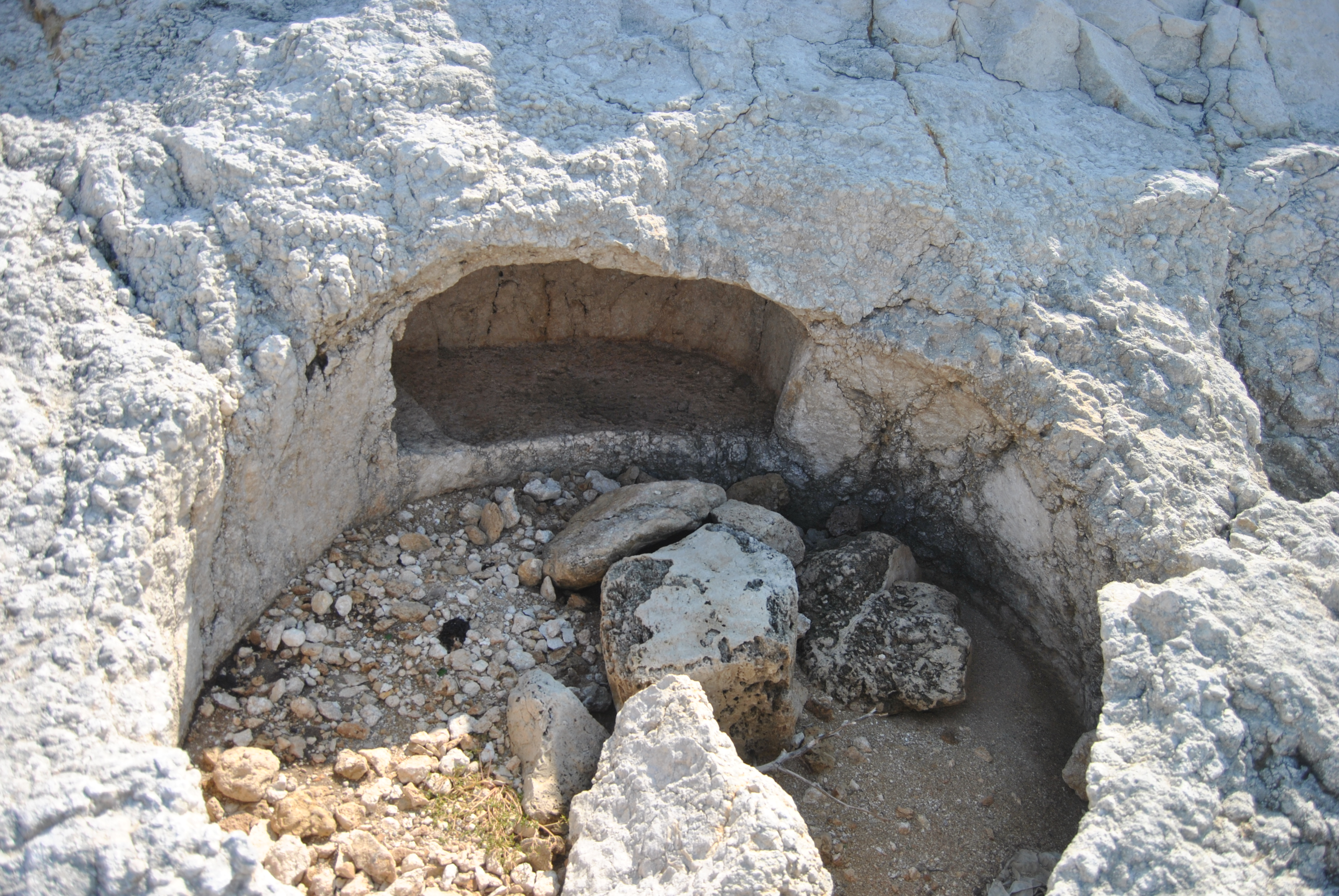
A rock-cut tomb in the necropolis

The site is notable for its village – the first known city in Sicily – and for its rich necropolis. David Abulafia writes:

A settlement at Thapsos, an offshore island in eastern Sicily, offers evidence of a sophisticated, imported culture, Mycenaean in origin. The settlers created a grid-like town with streets up to four metres wide, spacious houses built round courtyards, and tombs full of Late Helladic wares from the Greek lands, suggesting 'a veritable foreign colony on the site'. Indeed, the closest analogy to the layout of the houses in Thapsos is to be found at the other end of the Mycenaean world, on Cyprus, at Enkomi near Famagusta. It is almost as if a blueprint for a trading colony had been created and then transformed into reality at both ends of the Mycenaean world. Thapsos has yielded very many small perfume containers of Mycenaean origin. For it was a centre of industry, specializing in the production of perfumed oils for an 'international' market. But Thapsos was not simply an offshoot of Mycenae. It produced plenty of coarse grey pottery in Sicilian styles, indicating that Thapsos contained a mixed population.

Thucydides writes that Thapsos was a colony of Megara founded by the same people who founded Trotilon and Megara Hyblaea.

== See also ==
- Thapsos culture

== Bibliography ==
- Piccolo, Salvatore (2018). Bronze Age Sicily. World History Encyclopedia.
- Tusa, Sebastiano, La Sicilia nella Preistoria, second edition, Palermo 1992.
