= Hybla Major =

Hybla Major or Hybla Magna (Ancient Greek: Ὕβλα ἡ μείζων and Ὕβλα Μεγάλη) – the "Greater Hybla" – was a name used to identify the most important of the ancient cities named Hybla in Magna Graecia in Sicily.

== Controversy ==
There is much debate as to which of the cities named "Hybla" the name applied (Hybla Gereatis or Megara Hyblaea) and whether the name uniformly applied to the same city over the period during which the name was used. Initially Megara Hyblaea was the more important; it was founded c. 728 BCE and destroyed in c. 481 BCE. Hybla Gereatis, however, played an important role in the Second Punic War, in the 3rd century BCE.

A possible explanation of how the term arose is from a corruption of the rho in Greek Μέγαρα "Megara" to a lambda generating Μέγαλα "Megala" (meaning "greater"). The coins of Hybla Major bear the Greek legend "HYBLA MEGALAS".
