= Lamis =

In Greek mythology, Lamis (Ancient Greek: Λάμις) was one of the leaders of the satyrs who joined the army of Dionysus in his campaign against India.
