= Philipp Clüver =

German geographer and historian (1580–1622)

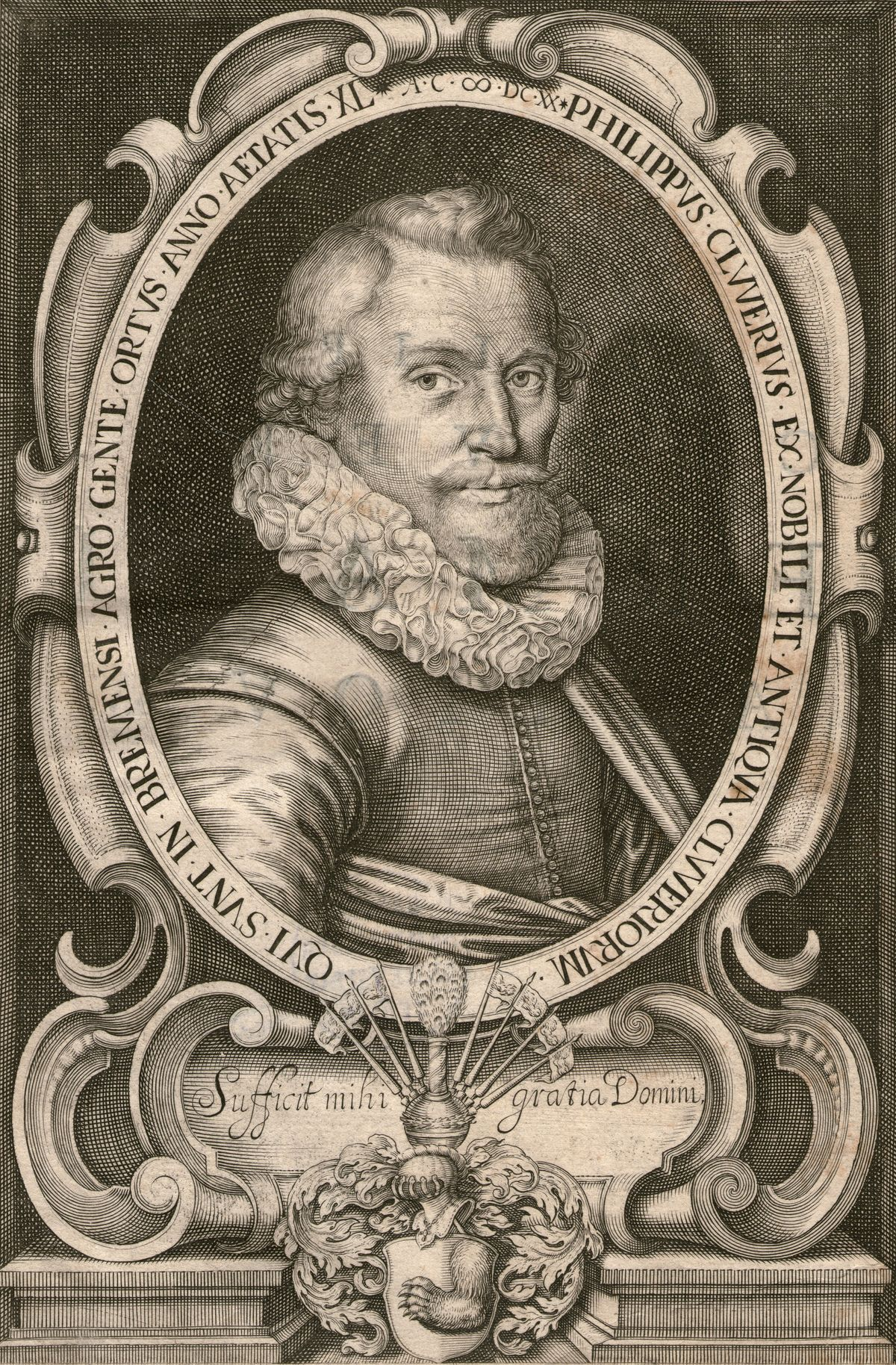
Philipp Clüver

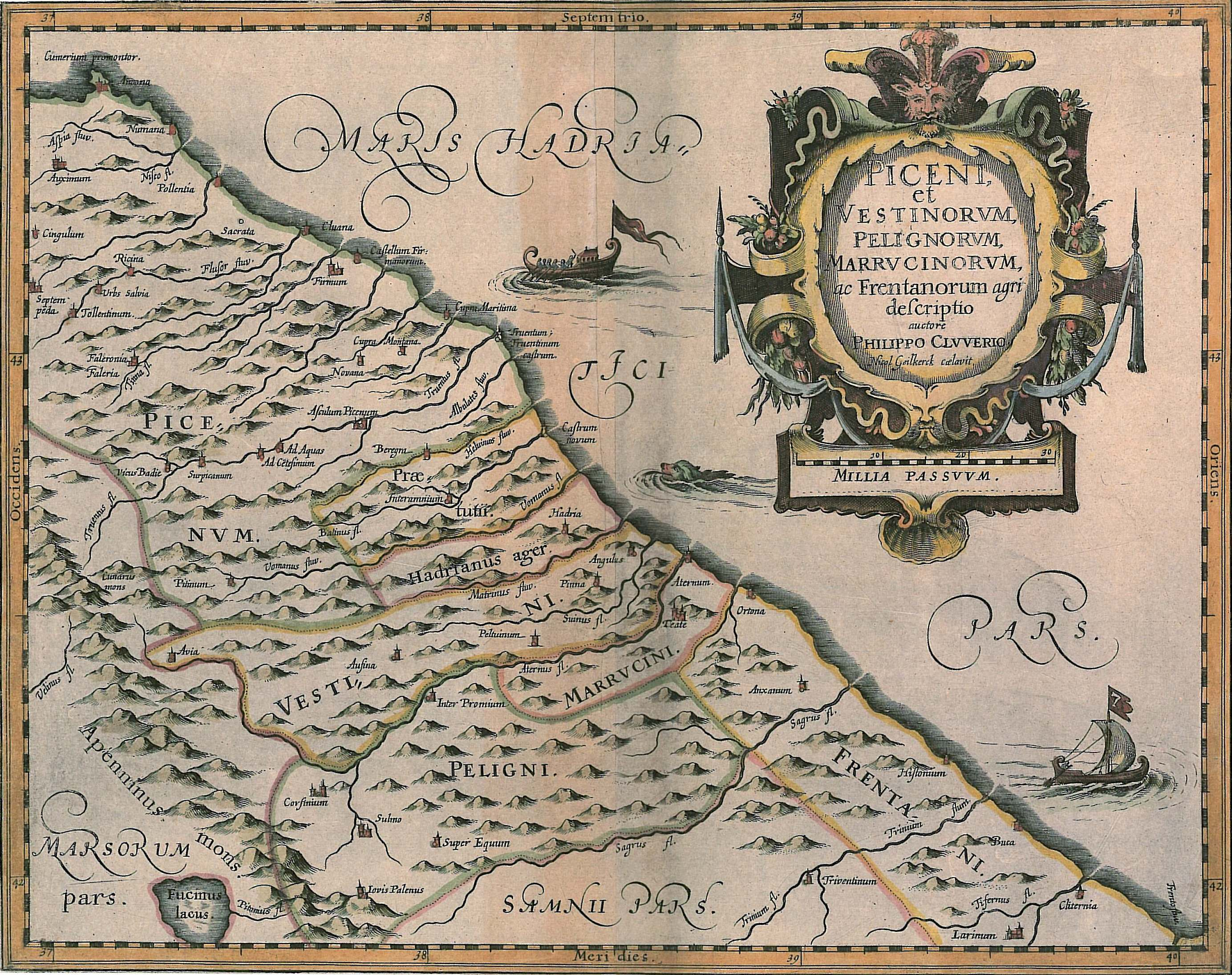
Map from Italia Antiqua (1624)

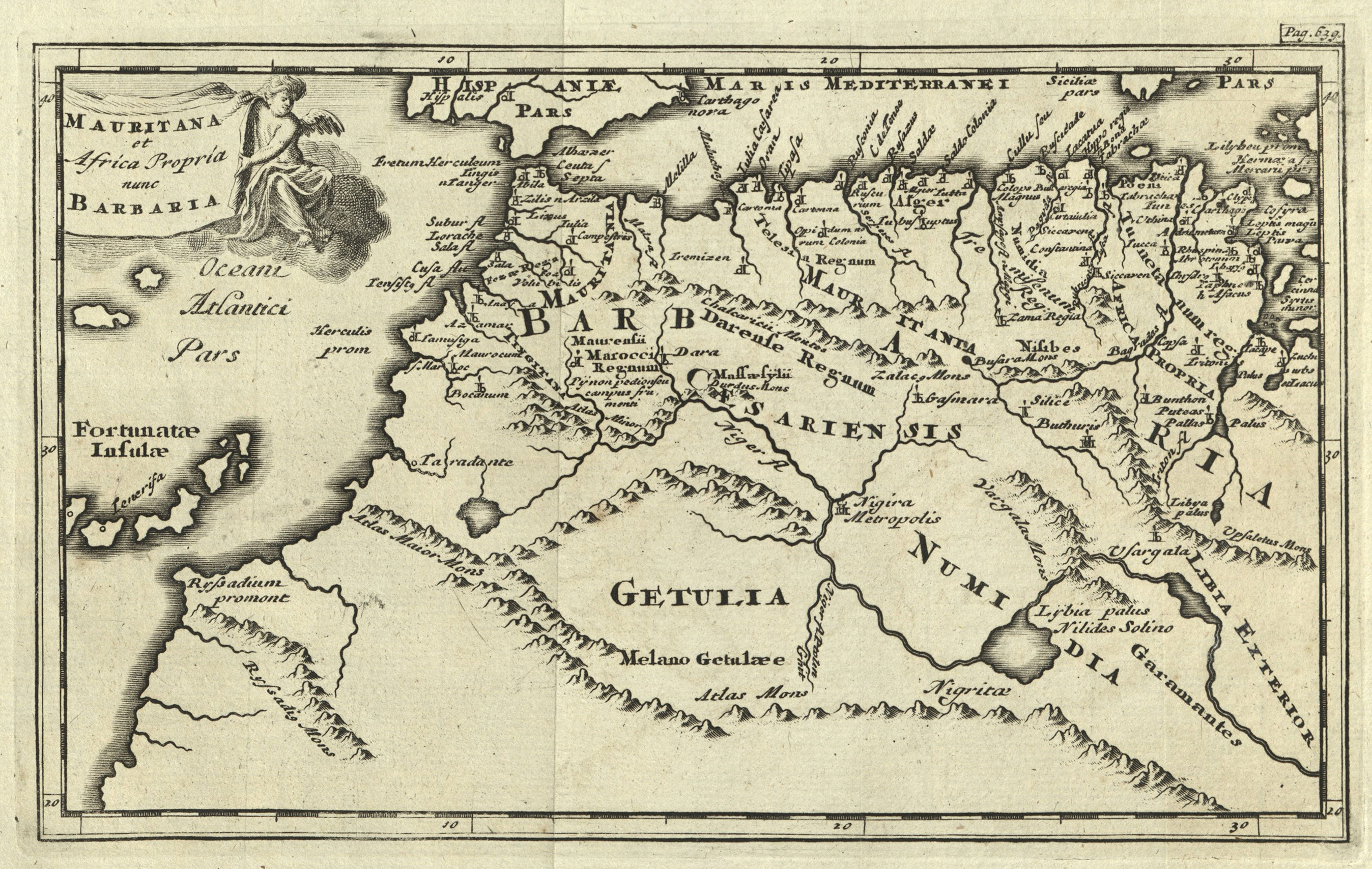
Clüver's Mauritania et Africa Propria nunc Barbaria, circa 1624

Philipp Clüver (also Klüwer, Cluwer, or Cluvier, Latinized as Philippus Cluverius) (1580 – 31 December 1622) was an Early Modern German geographer and historian.

== Life ==
Clüver was born in Danzig (Gdańsk), in Royal Prussia, a province of the Kingdom of Poland. After spending some time at the Polish court of Sigismund III Vasa, he began the study of law at the University of Leiden (Dutch Republic), but soon he turned his attention to history and geography, which were then taught there by Joseph Scaliger.

Clüver received science education from his father, who was Münzmeister at Danzig (coin master), but when Clüver went into different studies, his father stopped supporting his studies. He therefore travelled from Leiden across Hungary to Bohemia, where he did military service for a few years. While in Bohemia, he translated into Latin a defense by Baron Popel Lobkowitz, who was imprisoned. Upon his return to Leiden, he faced sanctions by the imperial (Habsburg) authorities for this, which however he could avoid with the help of his Leiden friends.

Clüver also travelled in England, Scotland, and France. He did all travel on foot, finally returning to Leiden, where (after 1616) he received a regular pension from the university. He died in Leiden.

== Work ==
Clüver was an antiquary, who was given a special appointment at Leiden as geographer and put in charge of the university's library, but his life's project, it developed, was a general study of the geography of Antiquity, based not only on classical literary sources, but – and this was his contribution – supplemented by wide travels and local inspections. He became virtually the founder of historical geography.

Clüver's first work, in 1611, concerning the lower reaches of the Rhine and its tribal inhabitants in Roman times (Commentarius de tribus Rheni alveis, et ostiis; item. De Quinque populis quondam accolis; scilicet de Toxandris, Batavis, Caninefatibus, Frisiis, ac Marsacis) touched a source of national pride among the Seventeen Provinces, for the Dutch were enjoying a twelve years' truce in their Eighty Years' War of liberation.

Clüver's Germaniae antiquae libri tres (Leiden, 1616) depends on Tacitus and other Latin authors. A volume on the antiquities of Sicily, with notes on Sardinia and Corsica (Sicilia Antiqua cum minoribus insulis ei adjacentibus item Sardinia et Corsica), published at Leiden by Louis Elsevier in 1619, is a useful source, with many reference from writers of Antiquity and maps that are often detached and sold to map collectors. His Introductio in universam geographiam, totally 6 parts, (published posthumously from 1624) was the first comprehensive modern geography, and became a standard geographical textbook.

Clüver was also a prolific a writer on mathematical and theological subjects. He is remembered by collectors and historians of cartography for his edition of Ptolemy's Geographia (based on Mercator's edition of 1578) and for miniature atlases that were reprinted for most of the 17th century. Many of his maps were etched for him by Petrus Bertius.

== Bibliography ==
- Germania Antiqua (1616)
- Siciliae Antiquae libri duo (1619)
- Sardinia et Corsica Antiqua (1619)
- Italia Antiqua (1624, posthumous)
- Introductio in Universam Geographiam (1624–1629)

== Gallery ==
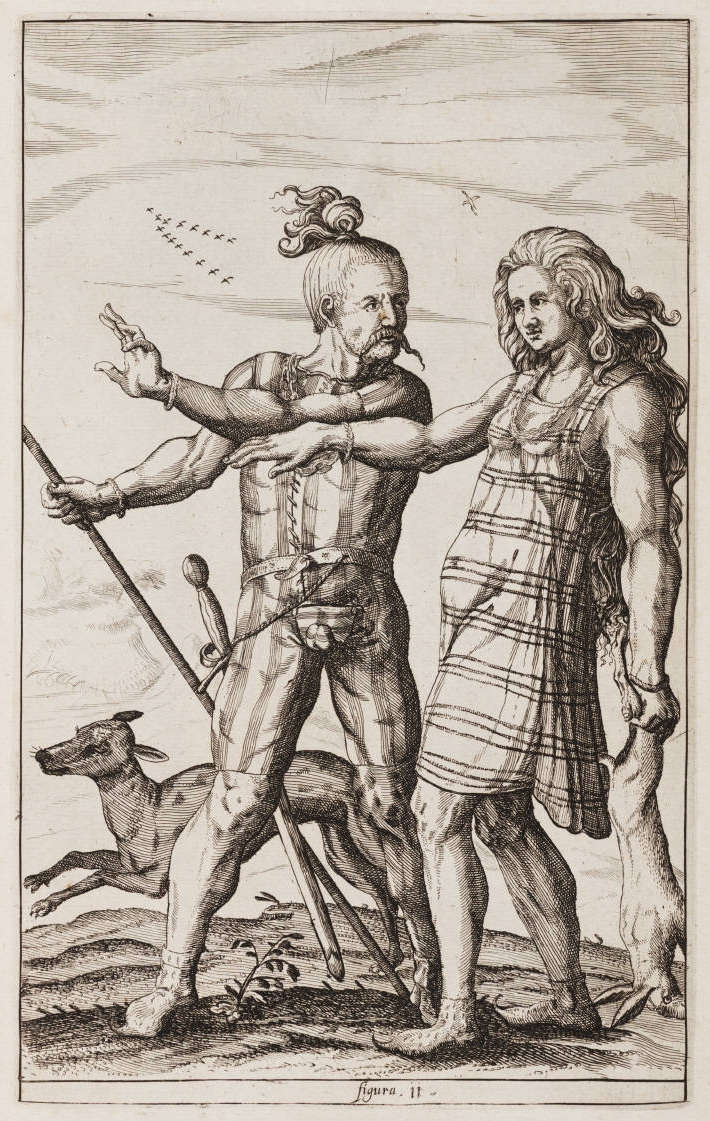
Germania antiqua, Pl. 11

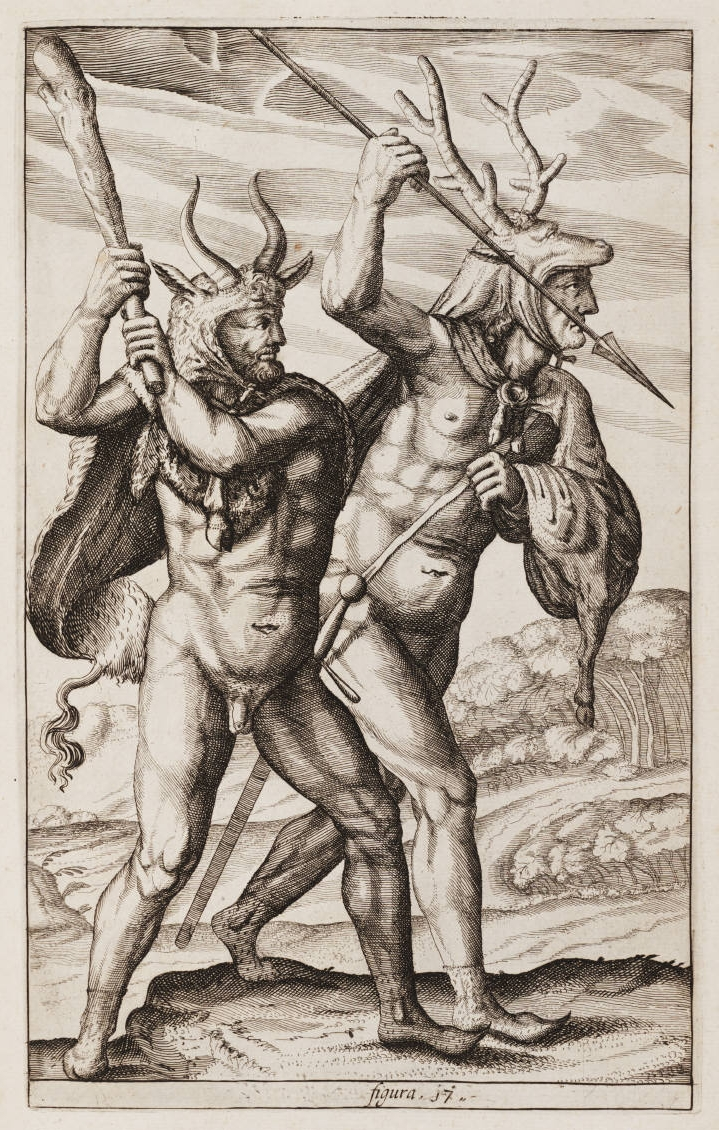
Germania antiqua, Pl. 17

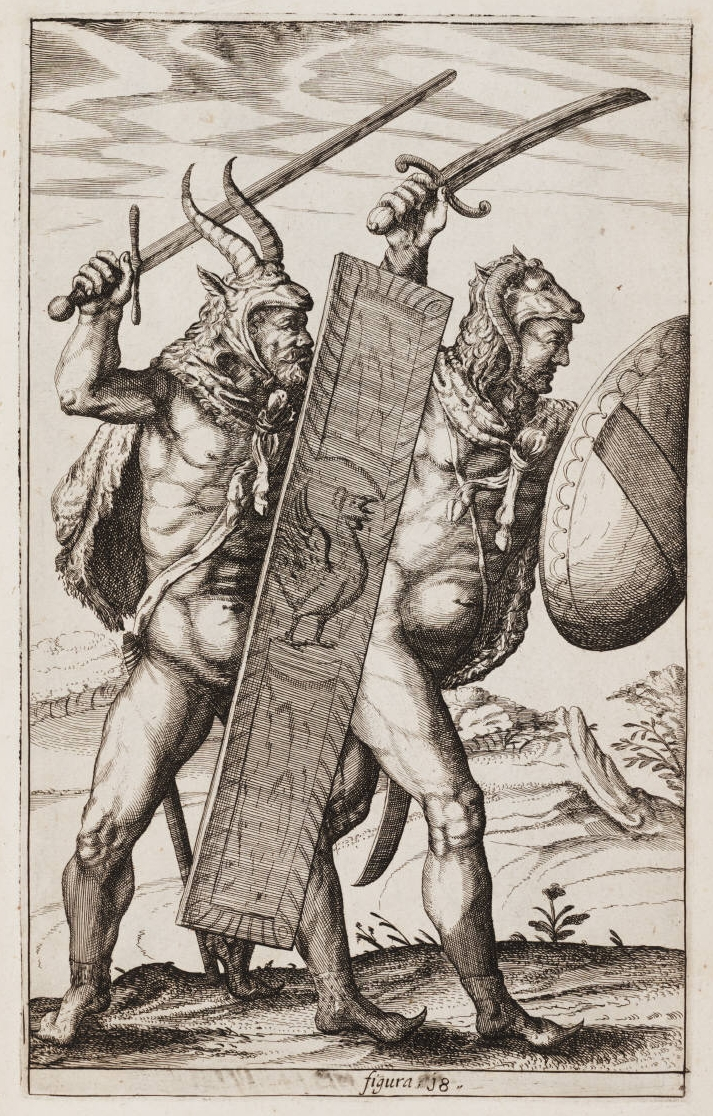
Germania antiqua, Pl. 18

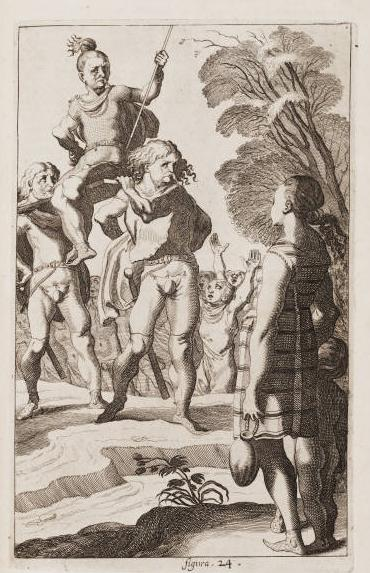
Germania antiqua, Pl. 24
