= Neapolitan Renaissance =

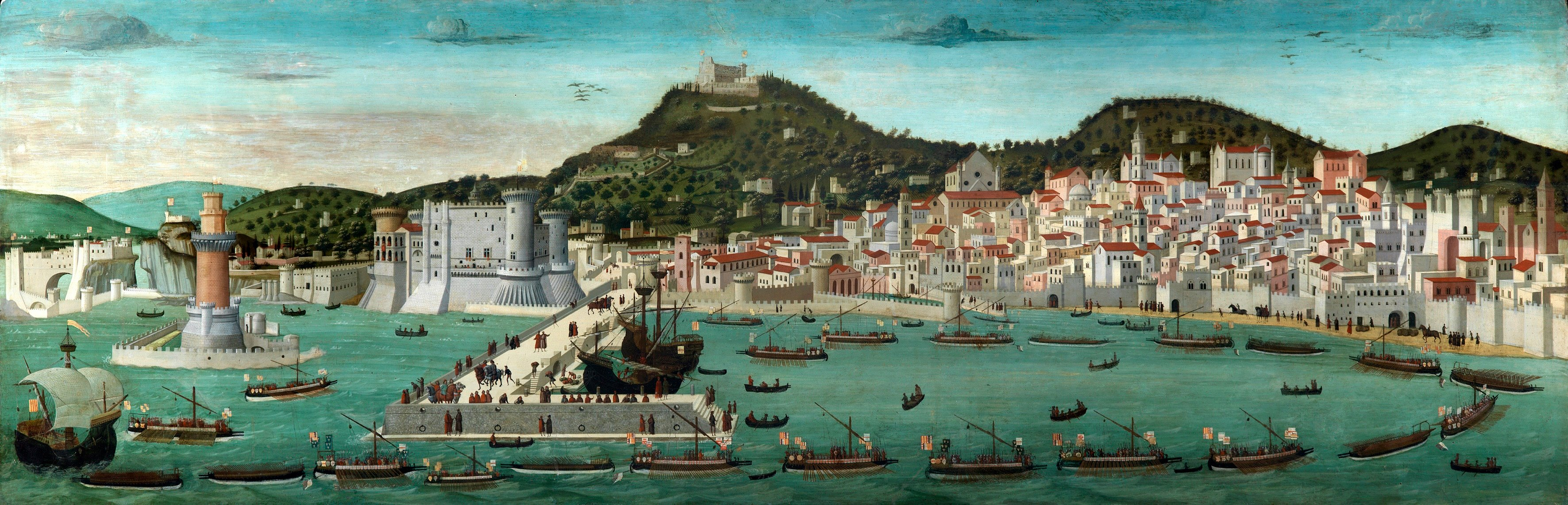
Tavola Strozzi — the first depiction of fifteenth-century Naples

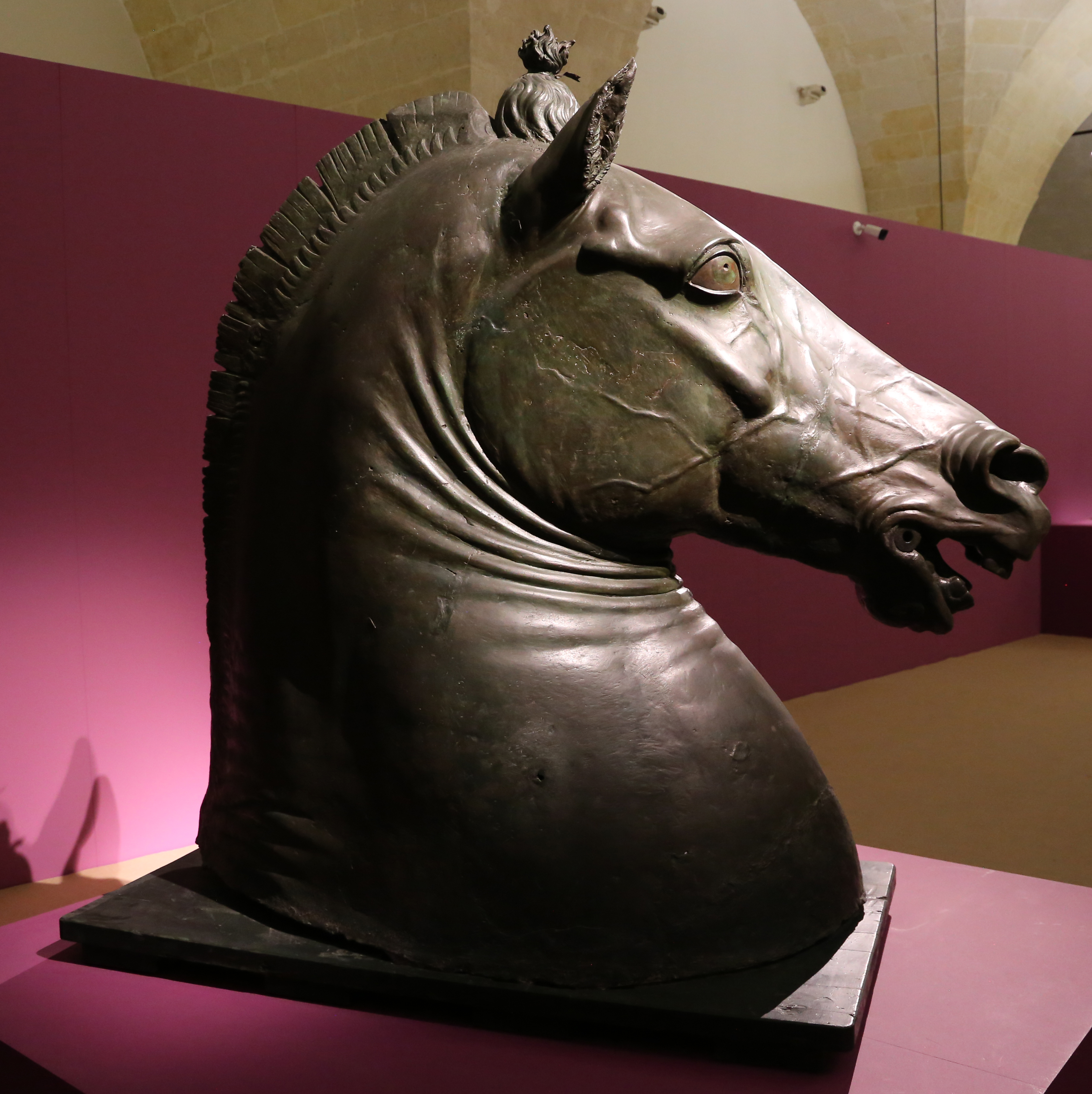
Protome Carafa - Donatello

The Renaissance in Naples refers to the development of Renaissance art and humanism in the capital and throughout the Kingdom of Naples. The period began in the early decades of the fifteenth century, with the arrival of works by Donatello and other Florentine sculptors and painters in the service of the Angevin court, and reached maturity after the conquest of the kingdom by the Crown of Aragon in the 1440s, which further strengthened ties with Florence and Milan.

The artistic production of this period was not always the work of local artists, but often of foreigners who arrived as authorised delegations within the framework of commercial and peace agreements established by the conditions of international geopolitics. The emergence of a distinct local artistic production had to await the end of the fifteenth century and coincided with the spread of the maniera moderna of Michelangelo, Leonardo da Vinci, Bramante, Raphael, Jacopo Sansovino and Polidoro da Caravaggio, whose works became the principal influences on artists of the kingdom.

Moreover, Aragonese Naples was one of the principal trading ports of the southern Mediterranean Sea, together with those of Sicily, maintaining commercial and cultural relations with what remained of the Byzantine Empire in the east and with the Spanish kingdoms. The close relationship with the latter, also linked to the fact that they shared the same ruling dynasty, became an important channel for the dissemination of the Italian Renaissance in the Iberian Peninsula.

This historical and artistic phenomenon, which encompassed fields ranging from philology to political thought and, in the arts, included painting, sculpture and architecture, reached its height between the end of the fourteenth century and the final years of the fifteenth century. Like much of the Italian peninsula, the period came to an end around the close of the third decade of the sixteenth century as a consequence of the political events that affected the entire continent.

== Historical background: Angevin proto-humanism ==
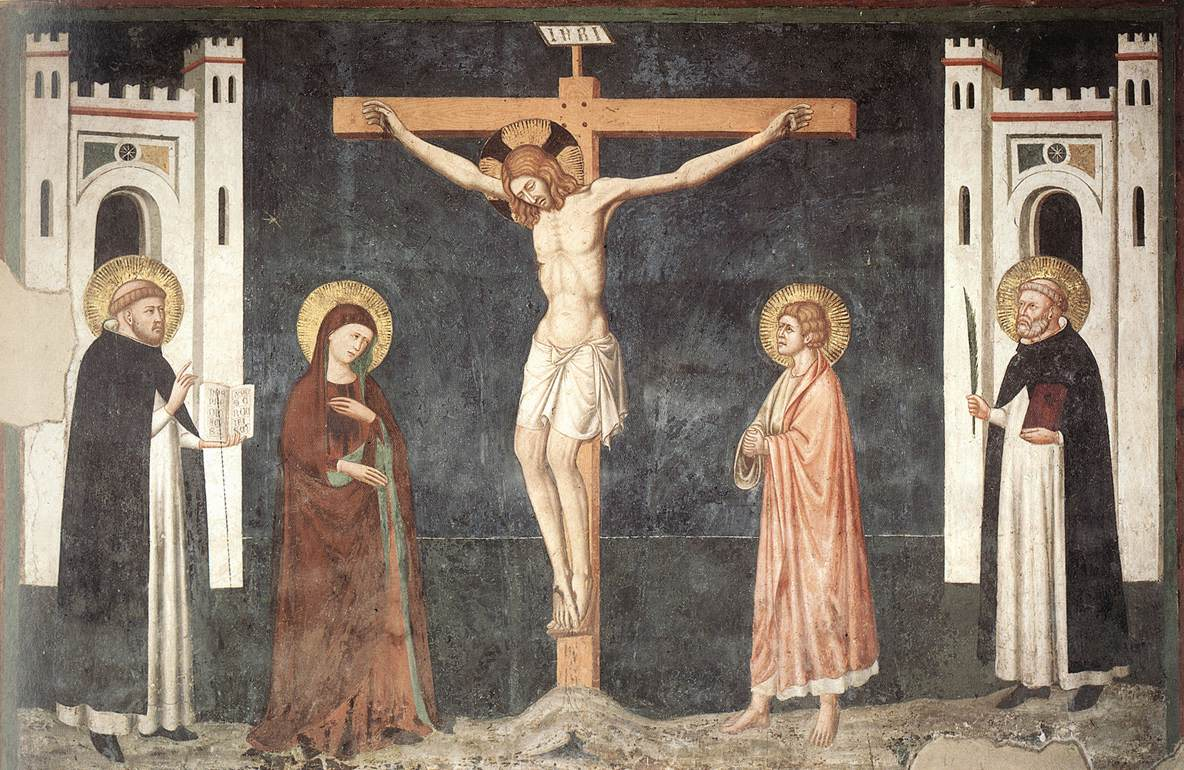
Pietro Cavallini, Crucifixion, Naples, Brancaccio Chapel, San Domenico Maggiore

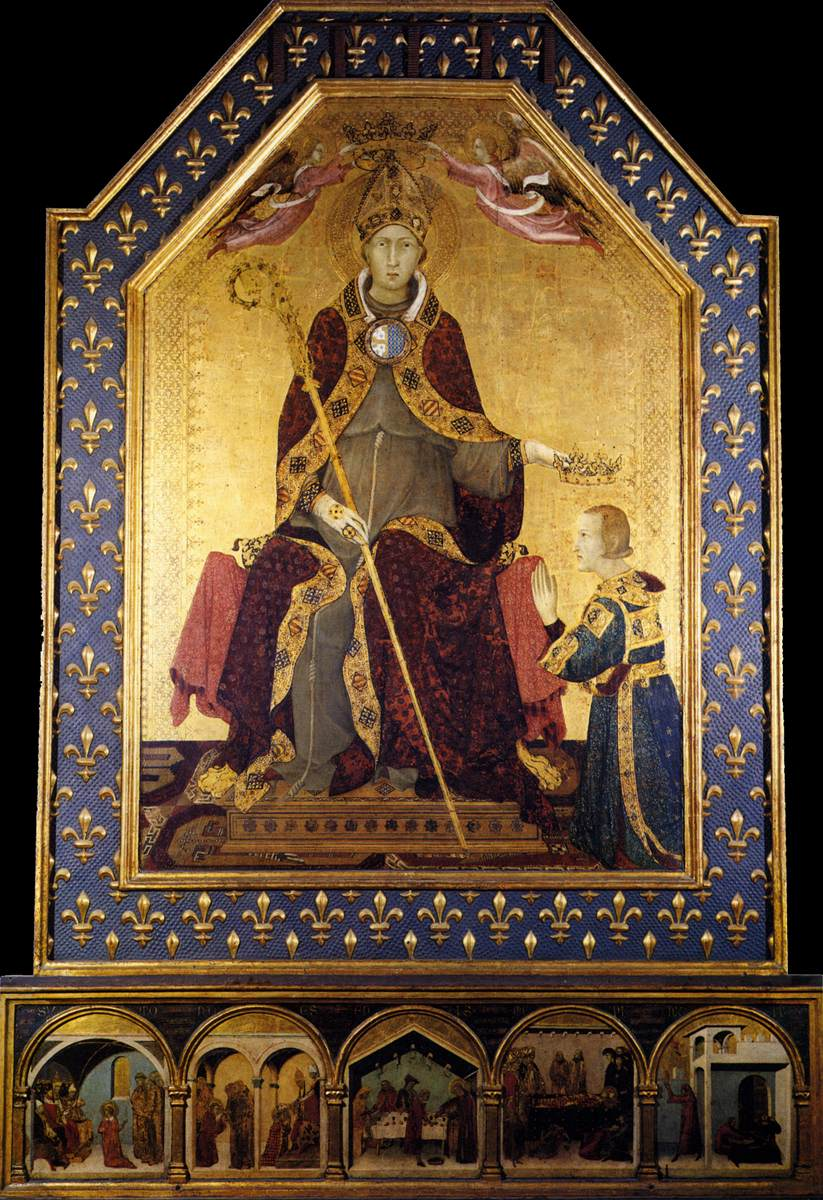
Simone Martini, Saint Louis of Toulouse Crowning His Brother Robert of Anjou, tempera on panel, 138 × 200 cm, from the Basilica of San Lorenzo Maggiore, Naples, Museo di Capodimonte, Naples.

With the consolidation of Angevin rule, Naples gradually assumed greater political and economic importance within the Italian and European context. Following the Peace of Caltabellotta in 1302, the kingdom experienced a period of economic and cultural prosperity, aided by political stability and by its reciprocal protection agreement with the Papal States. These circumstances encouraged a tradition of patronage that would develop further during the following century.

Although the Angevin crown remained closely attached to medieval Franco-Provençal customs and traditions, it also promoted the development of a native artistic culture modelled on the cultural innovations introduced by Frederick II. At the same time, the kingdom's most important secular institution, the University of Naples, became one of the leading centres of European and Italian thought, particularly in the field of jurisprudence, through the presence of distinguished figures such as Thomas Aquinas. The central figure of the so-called Neapolitan Trecento was Robert of Anjou, known as "the Wise", who was remembered by renowned writers such as Petrarch and Boccaccio as a cultured ruler and patron of the arts. After his second marriage to Sancia of Aragon, Robert promoted extensive conventual and religious building activity aimed at strengthening relations with the Holy See. This religious policy also created a demand for artistic renewal. Florentine, Sienese, and Lombard artists began arriving at court to work on major projects, including Tino di Camaino at the Certosa di San Martino and the basilicas of Santa Chiara and San Lorenzo; Giotto at Santa Chiara and in the general refurbishment of Castel Nuovo; Pietro Cavallini at San Domenico Maggiore; and Simone Martini, who arrived in the capital two decades before his aforementioned rival.

Thanks to this prolonged period of peace and to the arrival of writers, artists, and intellectuals, Naples acquired an important role in Italian and international culture and developed a cosmopolitan identity, as also described by Boccaccio. The formation of a Franco-Italian culture also encouraged the blending of transalpine courtly and chivalric literature with the classical works of Latin authors preserved in the royal library. This cultural environment influenced Boccaccio's Neapolitan writings and parts of The Decameron.

Meanwhile, the city expanded towards the harbour district and attracted new merchants from distant regions, who established the so-called loggias. The population consequently increased from 30,000 inhabitants to approximately 60,000 in the aftermath of the devastating Black Death of 1348. The resulting economic growth led to the establishment of the first foreign banking offices, mainly Florentine, thereby opening commercial relations with inland cities of the Italian peninsula.

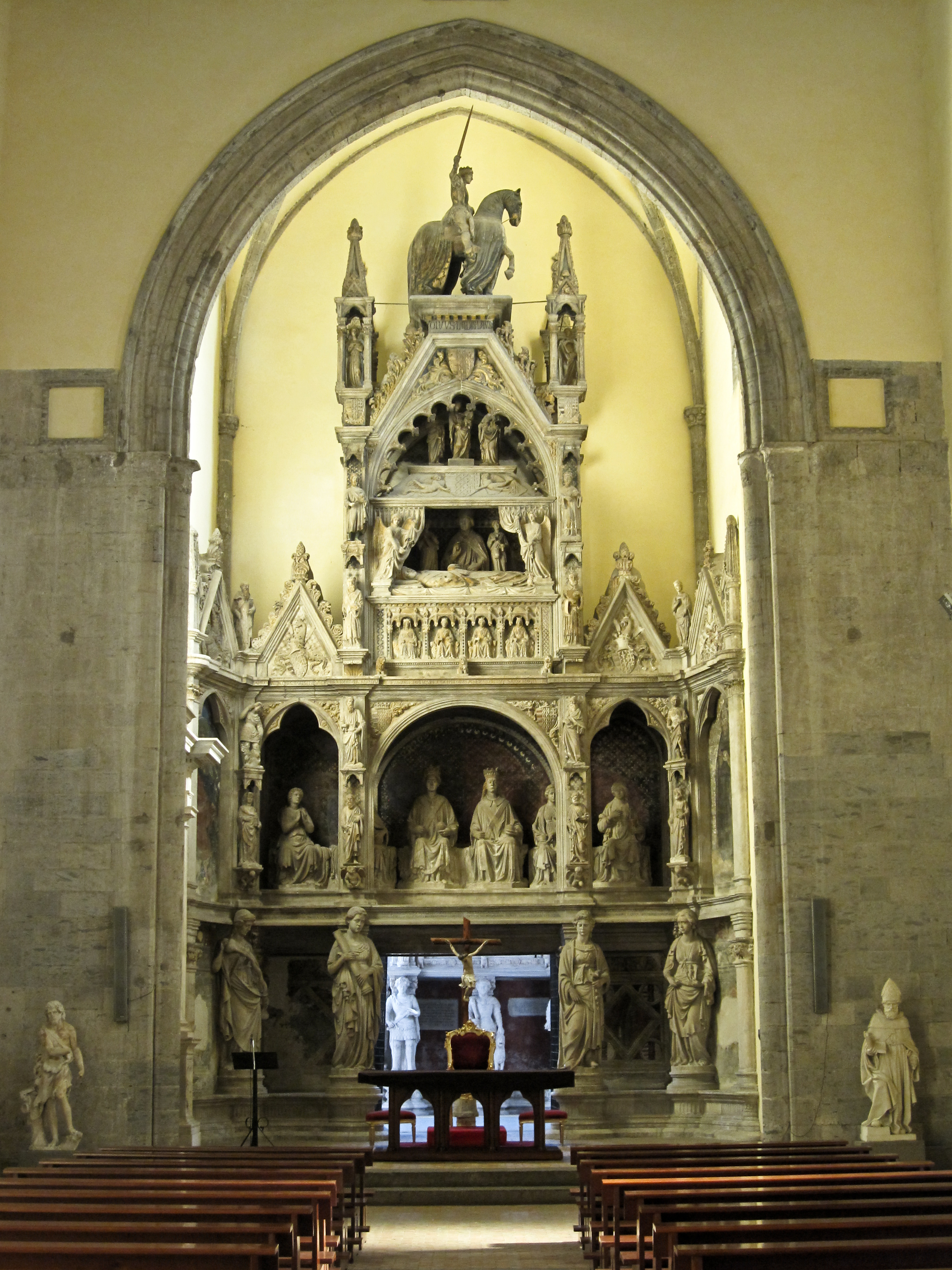
Funerary monument of Ladislaus of Naples, Andrea Ciccione, San Giovanni a Carbonara, Naples

With the death of Robert the Wise in 1343 and the outbreak of the Black Death five years later, the Angevin dynasty began its slow decline, despite the continuation of intense commercial exchanges throughout the western Mediterranean and with Northern Europe. From the second half of the fourteenth century onward, historians have identified what became known as the north-south conjuncture, which reached its peak between the end of the century and the first three decades of the 15th century. The reigns of Joanna I, her cousin Charles III of Durazzo, and Ladislaus I were marked by internal conflicts that undermined the long period of stability established during the early Angevin era. Wars were fought against the Kingdom of Hungary, as Joanna I herself was suspected of involvement in the death of her husband, Andrew of Hungary.

Political instability reached its height during the three decades spanning the turn of the fifteenth century, when Charles's son, Ladislaus I, sought to create a unified Italian state. This project provoked opposition from the Papal States, Florence, Pisa, and Louis II of Anjou. Ladislaus's campaigns and his mysterious death opened a new cultural phase throughout the kingdom, encouraged by the gradual easing of tensions with the other Italian states during the reigns of Joanna II and René I, the last Angevin ruler of southern Italy.

== 15th century ==
=== From Angevin to Aragonese rule ===
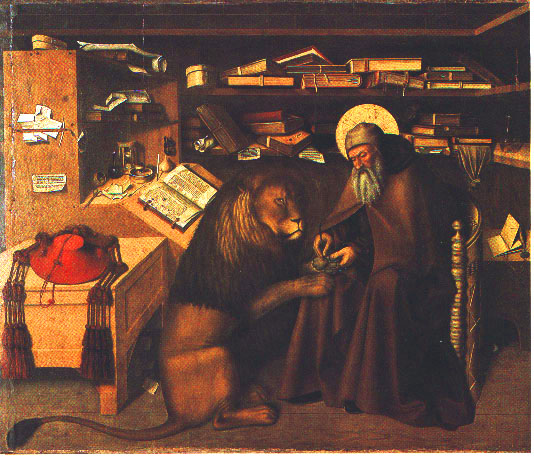
Colantonio, Saint Jerome in His Study

With the accession of Joanna II following the death of her husband, the kingdom regained the apparent stability of the previous century and witnessed a flourishing of the liberal arts comparable to that of the rest of the Italian peninsula. The process of reconciliation was hindered by Pope Martin V, who requested financial support from the queen to rebuild the papal army. Acting on the advice of Sergianni Caracciolo, the kingdom's most trusted counsellor, she refused. During the reign of Joanna II, the first tentative manifestations of fifteenth-century humanism began to emerge. The court, long receptive to artistic developments, undertook a programme of artistic renewal that initially focused on architecture, sculpture, and painting before extending to the other arts. Central to this transformation was the expansion of San Giovanni a Carbonara, originally commissioned by Ladislaus.

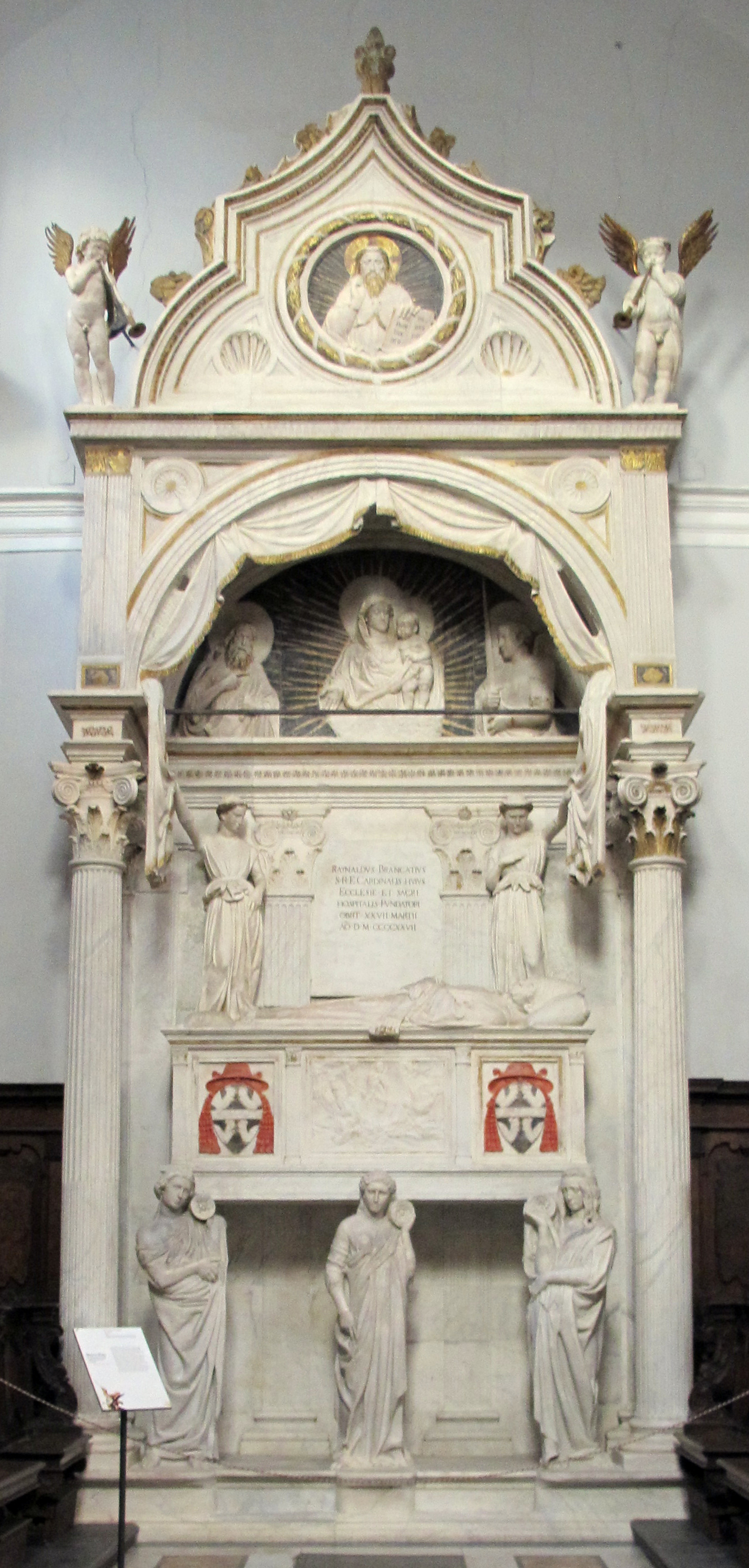
Donatello, Michelozzo, and Pagno di Lapo, Tomb of Cardinal Rinaldo Brancaccio, Sant'Angelo a Nilo

The continuous commercial exchanges between the Florentine community residing in the capital and the city on the banks of the Arno became a vehicle for the innovations taking shape in Florence. The names of Filippo Brunelleschi, Masaccio, and Donatello began to circulate widely. Donatello was the only major sculptor of the early Florentine humanist period to produce a work in Naples: the Tomb of Cardinal Rinaldo Brancaccio, executed between 1426 and 1428 with the assistance of Michelozzo and Pagno di Lapo Portigiani. The monument was carved in Florence and shipped by sea to Naples, where it was assembled. The tomb was also innovative from an iconographic standpoint, renewing the canopy-tomb type already seen in the funerary sculptures of Tino da Camaino at Santa Chiara and Santa Maria Donna Regina Vecchia. Donatello's work displays a strong sense of theatricality achieved through a sophisticated handling of perspective and marks the first introduction of the stiacciato technique in Naples. His influence proved significant in the capital, affecting even lesser local sculptors, as demonstrated by the Tomb of Ludovico Aldomorisco by Antonio Baboccio da Piperno. Although completed a few years before the Brancaccio monument, it already exhibits compositional solutions associated with Donatello, probably acquired through the sculptor's travels throughout the Italian peninsula before settling in Naples.

The expansion works at San Giovanni a Carbonara witnessed the gradual overcoming of Late Gothic forms through the construction of the Caracciolo del Sole Chapel. The architectural layout of the interior still reflects the influence of large rib-vaulted umbrella domes. The first tentative departure from medieval conventions can be seen in the fresco cycles executed by non-local painters, who remained indebted to Giottesque and Cavallinian traditions while incorporating influences from beyond the Alps, particularly the Flemish approach, which was then spreading widely among the city's workshops. Especially innovative were the cycles by Leonardo da Besozzo, which reveal a growing sensitivity to the representation of spatial depth, though without attaining the scientific perspective developed by Brunelleschi and employed by Masaccio. Other artists active in this context included Perinetto da Benevento and Antonio da Fabriano.

The tomb of Sergianni Caracciolo deserves separate consideration. Dating from the 1420s and 1430s, its composition still belongs to the medieval conception of the funerary monument and is attributed to an artist from the Tuscan milieu who had not yet fully embraced classical expressiveness. Scholars have attributed the work either to Andrea Ciccione or Andrea Guardi, both Florentine sculptors and collaborators of Donatello, whose influence is evident in the full-length figures at the base of the monument. Also attributed to Andrea da Firenze is the enormous funerary monument dedicated to Ladislaus. Commissioned by Joanna, sister of the deceased king, the structure rises to approximately twenty metres in height, making it one of the most complex sculptural works produced during the early fifteenth century. The composition is arranged in four tiers. In the central section of the second tier, beneath an arch of modern taste, stand the statues of the two rulers supported by the four cardinal virtues. Enclosing the monument in the third and fourth tiers is the traditional funerary canopy already employed in the Angevin tombs of Tino da Camaino.

The reign of René of Anjou was particularly significant for Neapolitan art in the early fifteenth century. During this brief but intense period, supported by the king's patronage of numerous court artists, the north-south conjuncture reached its peak. Many Flemish artists arrived in Naples, the most prominent being Barthélemy d'Eyck, who established a painting workshop in the city where the master of Antonello da Messina, Colantonio, received his training.

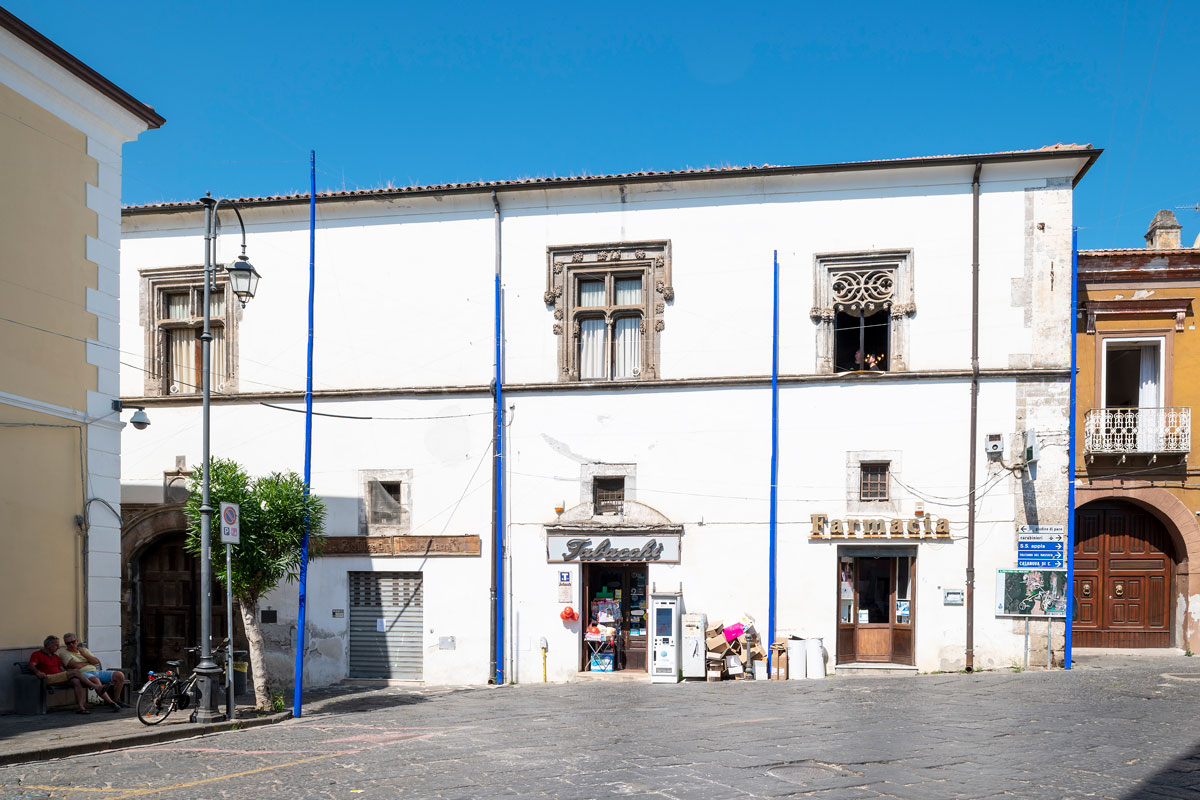
View of the façade of Palazzo Petrucci in Carinola

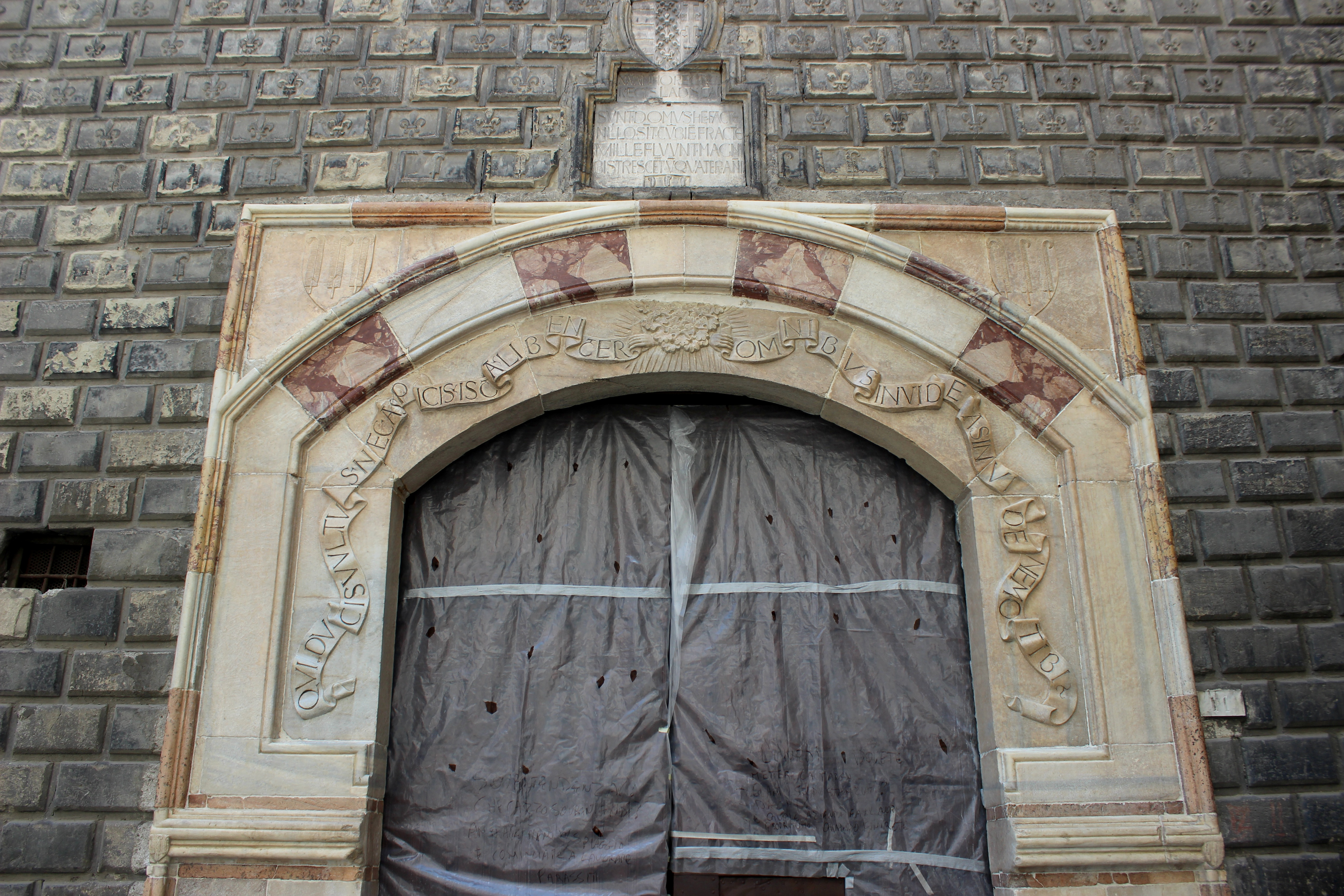
Detail of the façade of Palazzo Penne, a paradigmatic example of architecture from the first half of the century

In architecture, Italian Gothic forms gave way to a synthetic language combining northern European, Italian, and Renaissance elements. Unlike Brunelleschi's approach, this transition was not characterised by the systematic study of Roman antiquity but rather by the incorporation of classical forms into a framework still rooted in Franco-Provençal traditions, traces of which remain visible in many inland towns. The clearest symbol of this transition was the replacement of the pointed Gothic arch with the Roman semicircular arch. The latter, however, continued to be interpreted through decorative motifs inherited from Gothic art, such as trilobed mouldings, or through the use of trabeated profiles enriched with pierced vegetal ornament and window motifs. Both features can be observed in Palazzo Petrucci-Covelli in Carinola.

In 1438, the kingdom was besieged by Alfonso of Trastámara, placing René under severe pressure and forcing him to seek assistance from the pope and the Sforza rulers of Milan. The latter were defeated in 1443, and in the same year the union of the kingdoms of Sicily and Naples was proclaimed. The first years of Aragonese rule were difficult. The capital lost part of its privileges, with serious consequences for local intellectual life following the temporary closure of the university founded by Frederick II. Alfonso sought to adapt himself to the culture and style of the central and northern Italian courts. He initiated a policy of controlling the local feudal nobility, beginning a process that would reach its full development in the following century: the gradual concentration of aristocrats around the Aragonese court. Naples became a vast building site for civil and religious architecture, while in the kingdom's inland regions construction methods and decorative schemes continued to reflect the lingering influence of Angevin International Gothic traditions.

Alfonso was a learned ruler and patron of the arts, comparable to his contemporaries in central and northern Italy, and assembled at court one of the most important libraries on the peninsula. The closure of the university served as a demonstration that the official culture of the kingdom was that promoted by the court. Aragonese humanism counted among its leading figures Lorenzo Valla and Giovanni Pontano, who were among the most representative authors of the early Aragonese period. They were followed by Il Panormita and Bartolomeo Facio.

=== The decline of Late Gothic and the emergence of a southern Renaissance style ===
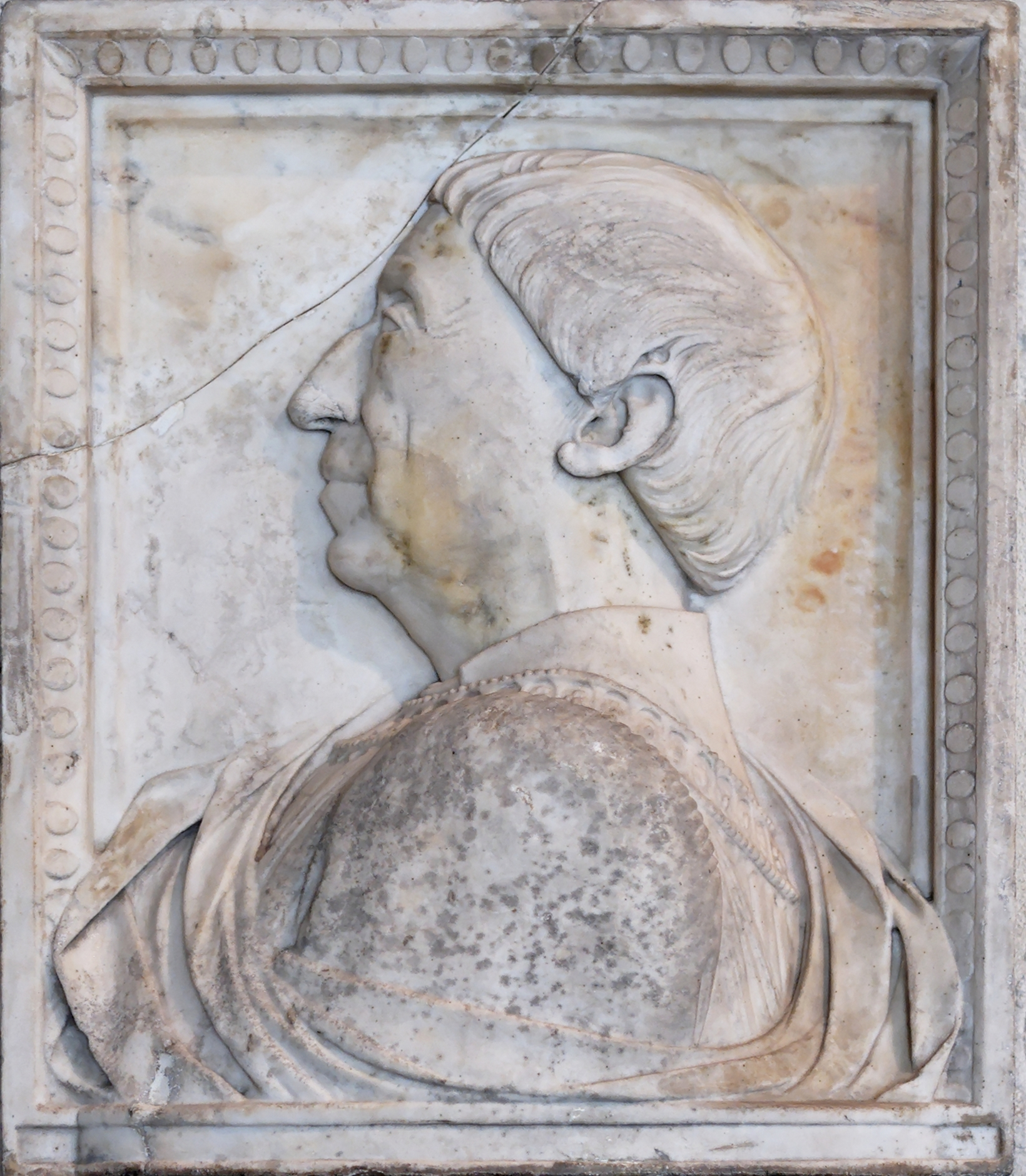
Mino da Fiesole, Portrait of Alfonso V of Aragon – Louvre

With the accession of the Aragonese dynasty, the kingdom embarked upon a broad renewal of customs and artistic culture. The assimilation of Tuscan forms was not yet fully mature, but the first tentative experiments already initiated during the reigns of the last Angevin rulers demonstrated the existence of a vibrant cultural environment capable of absorbing artistic languages and personalities from diverse backgrounds within the intellectual milieu of the new court.

As a capable ruler, Alfonso understood the importance of two complementary programmes for consolidating his authority in a kingdom still attached to the previous dynasty. He promoted an ambitious programme of urban development, which would be continued by his successors, together with a gradual renewal of the visual arts, which largely followed the course of architectural patronage.

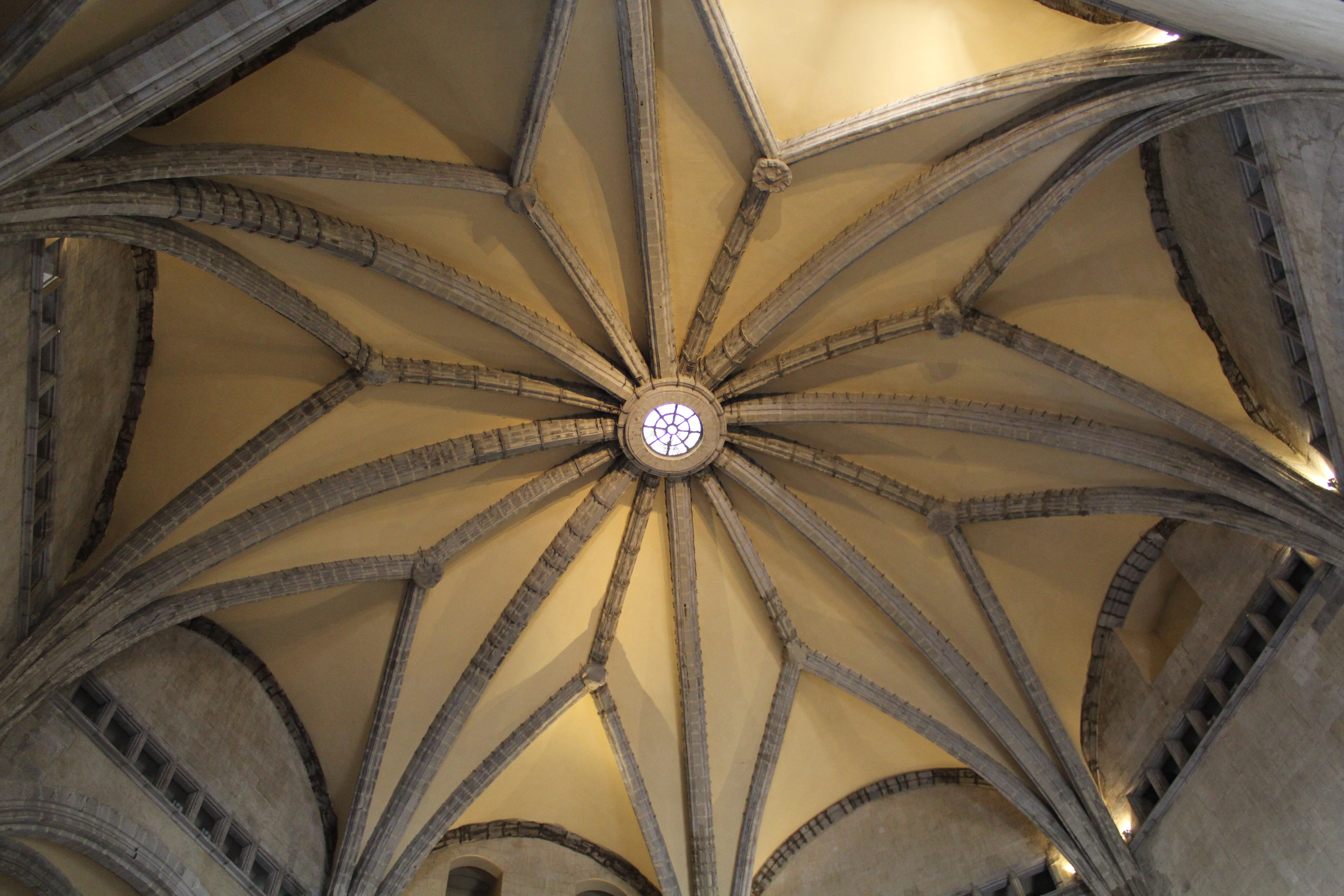
Castel Nuovo, vault of the Hall of the Barons

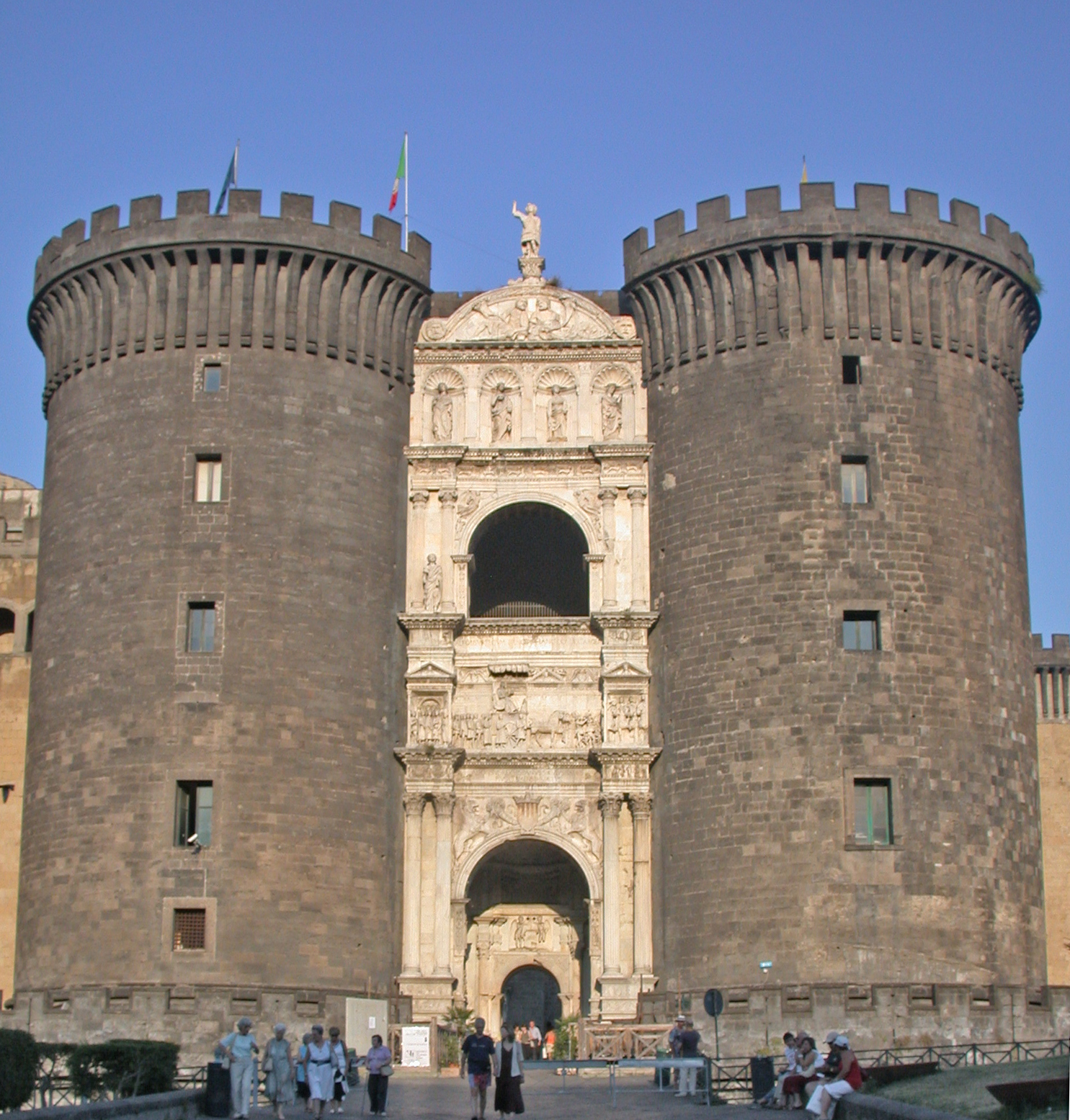
Castel Nuovo, the triumphal arch of Alfonso of Aragon, the first architectural work in the Renaissance style in Naples

He invited to court architects such as Guillem Sagrera, engravers including Pisanello, and painters such as Jean Fouquet and Jaime Baço. Sagrera was entrusted with the delicate role of court architect until his death in 1456. He was responsible for adapting Castel Nuovo from a purely military royal fortress, in accordance with medieval principles, into a princely residence better suited to changing times. A native of the Balearic Islands, Sagrera introduced new spatial concepts characteristic of Catalonia, initiating a process of stylistic hybridisation between residual Flemish-Provençal experiments and classical forms. His greatest achievement was the Hall of the Barons in Castel Nuovo, covered by an octagonal umbrella vault that retained a Late Medieval formal structure, with finely decorated projecting ribs connected by a keystone incorporating a central oculus, probably conceived as a tribute to the Pantheon.

As part of the renovation works, a commemorative area was prepared that later became the site of what is generally regarded as the turning point in fifteenth-century Neapolitan architecture and sculpture: the triumphal arch. The complex monument celebrating the new kingdom was initially sketched by Pisanello, but his proposal was soon rejected for lacking an innovative decorative programme. Francesco Laurana, then active in the territories of the Republic of Venice, was subsequently called to Naples. Laurana's artistic training incorporated the latest developments in design associated with Piero della Francesca as well as the classical treatises rediscovered at the beginning of the century and reinterpreted by the humanist and artist Leon Battista Alberti. According to scholars, one of the principal sources of inspiration for the project was the Frederick II gate at Capua, which itself drew upon the theme of imperial sovereignty in the ancient world. Numerous foreign artists of diverse backgrounds participated in the construction. Among them were sculptors influenced by Donatello, such as Antonio di Chellino and Isaia da Pisa; Lombard artists including Jacopo della Pila, Paolo Taccone, Pietro da Milano, and Tommaso Malvito; and even sculptors from Ticino such as Domenico Gagini, whose sons later achieved considerable success in Palermo.

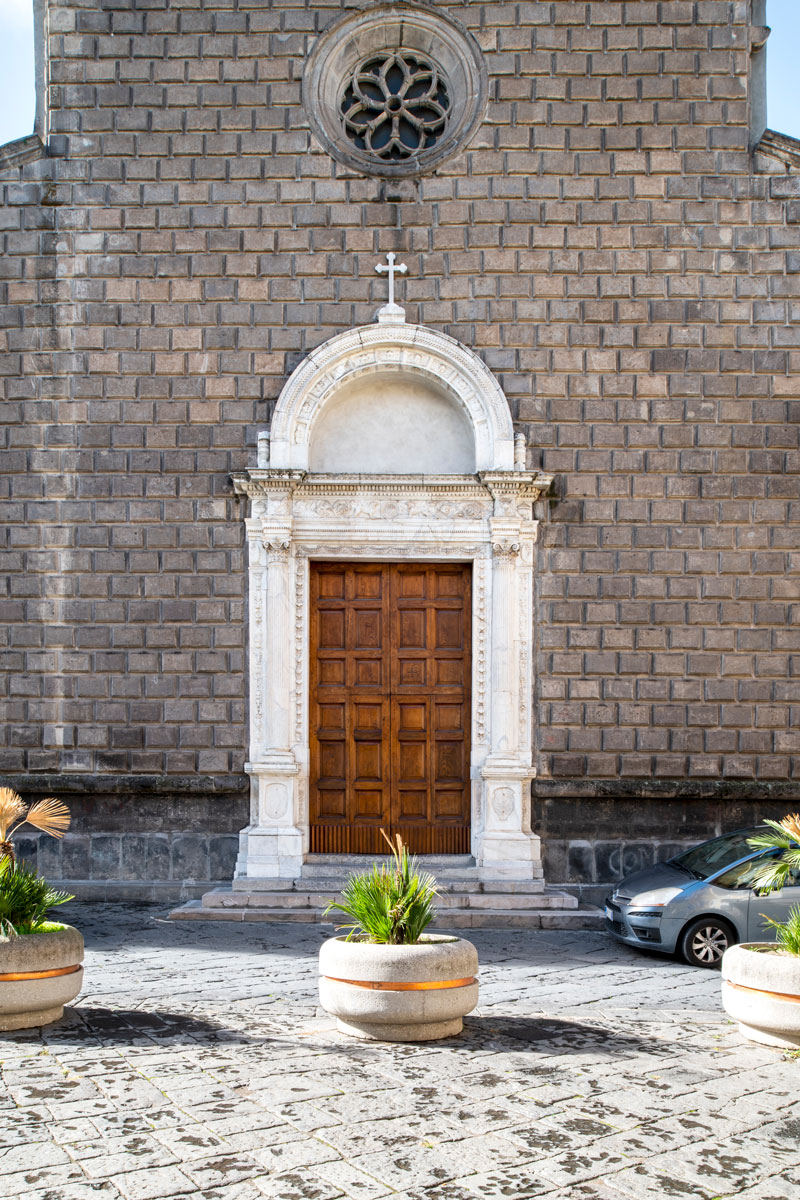
Fifteenth-century façade with flat rustication of the Collegiate Church of Saint John the Baptist in Angri. Classical-style main portal surmounted by a Catalan-style rose window, set within a tuff masonry façade treated with flat rustication and a torus base moulding.

The so-called "climate of the arch" remained, during this period of renewal, an isolated example of complete figurative and compositional modernisation within the local artistic landscape, albeit with certain compositional and semiological uncertainties in the formulation of its architectural order, as noted by Roberto Pane. Until the 1470s, hybrid Late Medieval and Catalan models continued to dominate both architecture and sculpture. The nobility, not yet fully acquainted with the new style, generally preferred to modernise their urban residences according to markedly traditionalist tendencies. The principal agents in the dissemination of these hybrid forms were local workshops indebted to the artistic language of Antonio Baboccio da Piperno.

Meanwhile, lesser-known artists from the kingdom increasingly travelled to Rome to study and survey the monuments of antiquity while also updating their knowledge through classical and Albertian treatises. During the eighteenth and nineteenth centuries, the presumed Renaissance artist Angelo Aniello Fiore was credited with several important works, including the portal of Palazzo Petrucci, the portal of Palazzo Diomede Carafa, and tomb monuments in San Domenico Maggiore and San Lorenzo.

King Alfonso also sought to strengthen ties with the local nobility through marriage alliances. His daughter Eleanor married the royal admiral Marino Marzano. Conscious of the prestige and influence he had gained through this union, Marzano decided to transform his residence at Carinola, most likely commissioning either Sagrera himself or his son Jaume Sagrera to design the project. Today only a portion of the original palace survives due to the severe deterioration it suffered during the century preceding its recent restoration. The building is organised around a courtyard rising over two storeys in a purely Catalan style and is accessed by a striking open staircase turning at a right angle.

Minor architecture also expanded significantly after the destruction caused by the severe earthquake of 1456. The systematic reconstruction of damaged urban blocks provided noble families with opportunities to create new residential complexes, while monastic orders were able to enlarge their monasteries without hindrance.

=== The maturation of styles and the arrival of Florentine masters in Naples ===
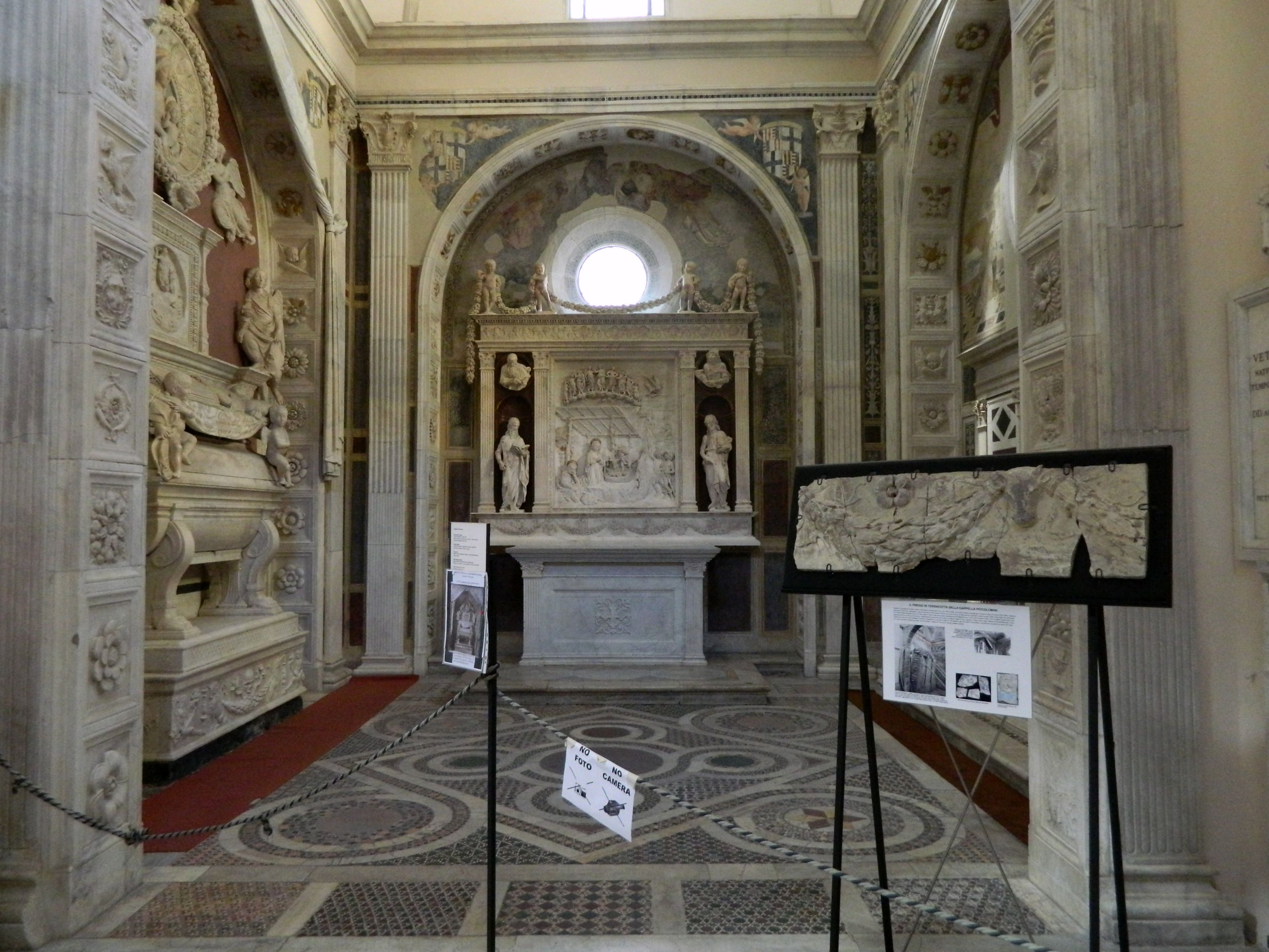
Antonio Rossellino, Giuliano, and Benedetto da Maiano, Piccolomini Chapel

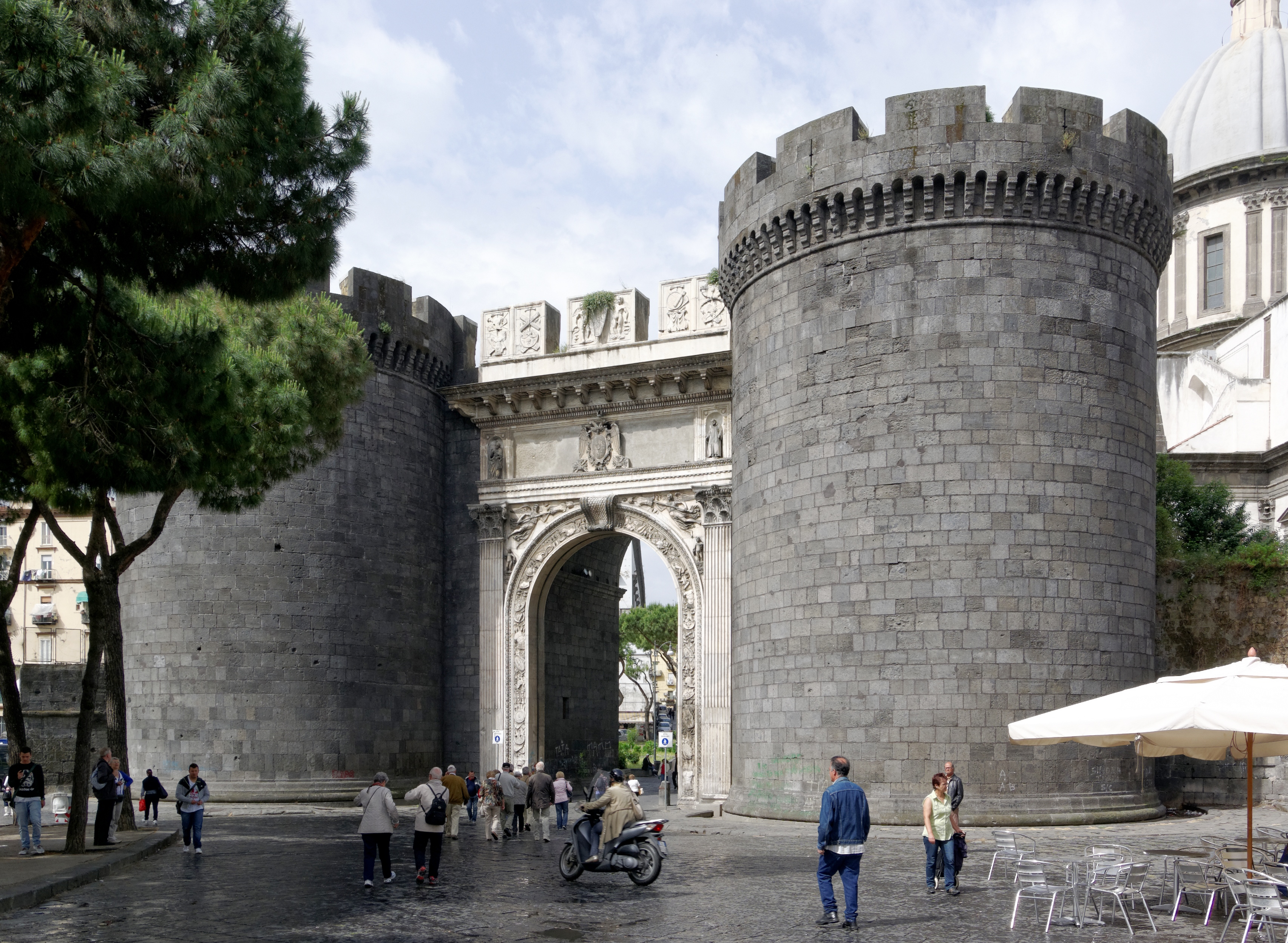
Giuliano da Maiano, Porta Capuana

Throughout the reign of Alfonso and for much of that of his son Ferrante, the artistic scene was dominated by Catalan and Renaissance hybrid forms, interpreted with considerable stylistic coherence by local craftsmen. This can be seen, for example, in Palazzo Maiorani, in the nearby alley of the same name, and in the remains of Palazzo D'Afflitto and the opposite Palazzo di Ludovico di Bux. In the first case, the staircase is introduced by a pair of semicircular arches with hexagonal profiles, a characteristic feature of Catalan architecture, while in the latter buildings the hybrid language is evidenced by the surviving covered loggias and depressed entrance halls. During this later transitional phase, the characteristic depressed arches framed within rectangular surrounds moulded with a half-torus profile turning at the springing level became widespread.

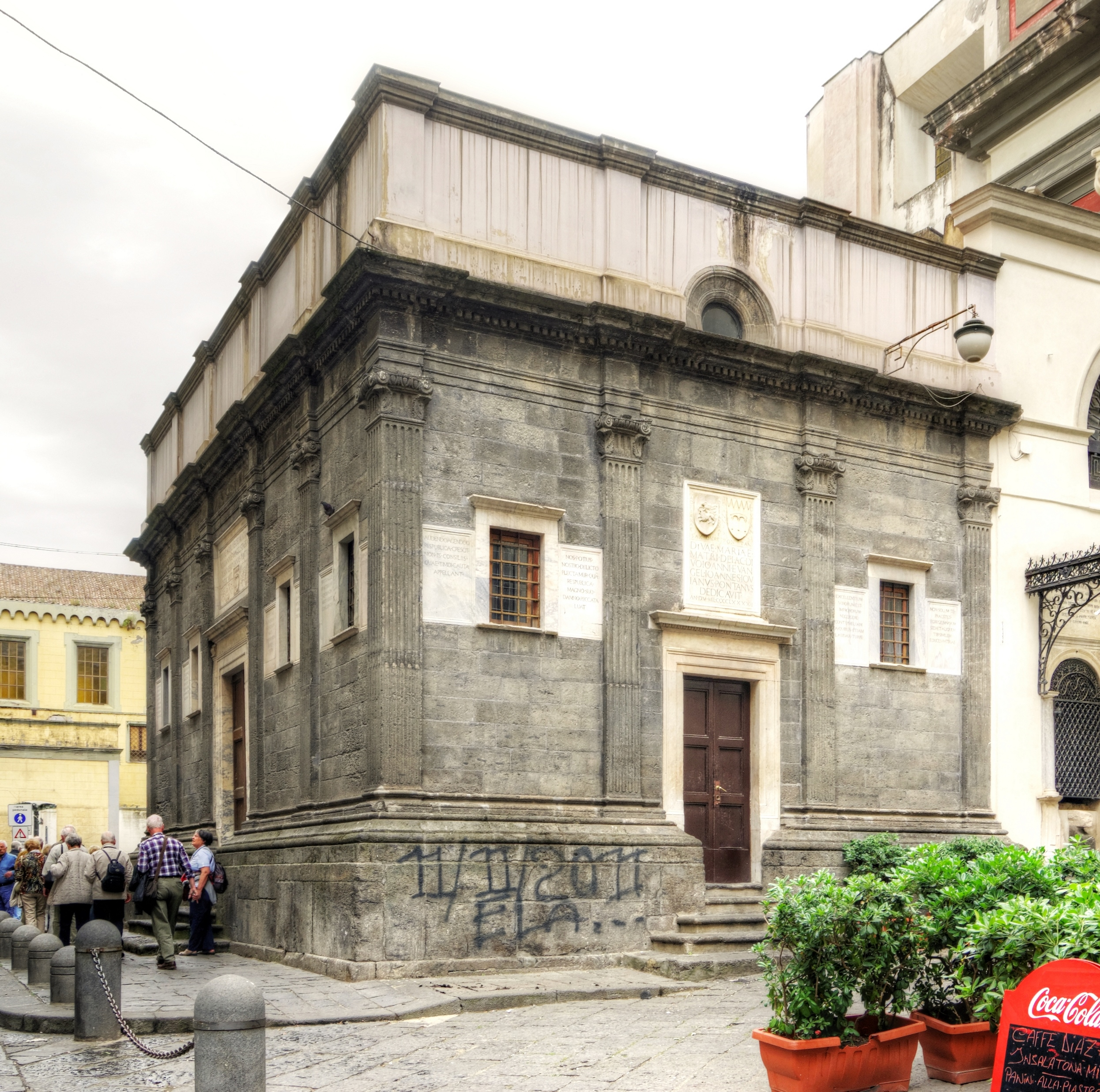
Giovanni Giocondo or Francesco di Giorgio Martini, Pontano Chapel

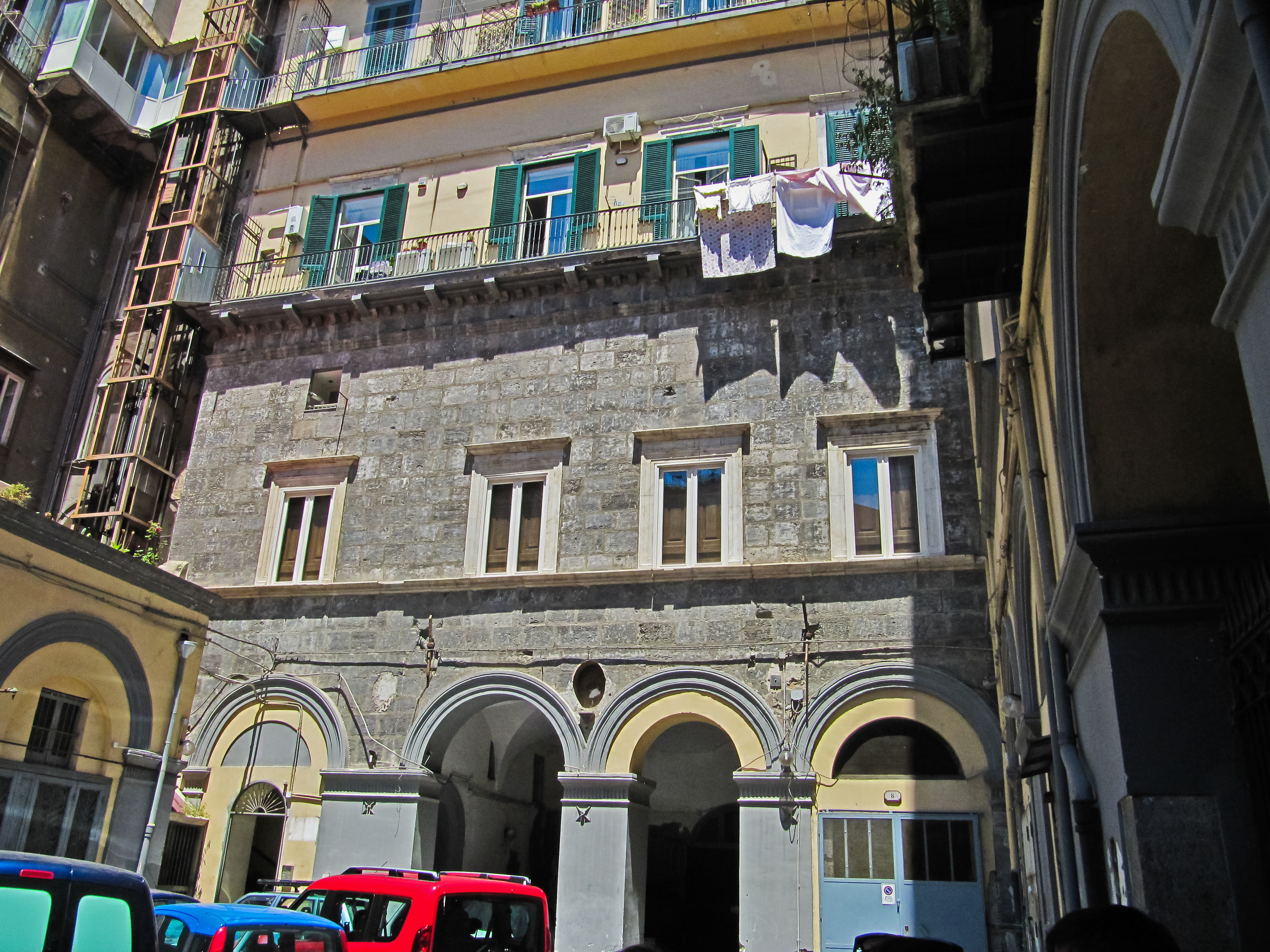
Giuliano da Maiano, remains of La Conigliera of Alfonso II

During the reigns of Alfonso and Ferrante, the political landscape of the Italian peninsula underwent periods of intense crisis. First came the ratification of the Peace of Lodi in 1454, following the wars between Milan and Venice for dominance over Lombardy. Later, after the anti-Medici conflicts culminating in the Pazzi conspiracy, the kingdom was compelled to negotiate peace with Lorenzo the Magnificent. The Medici policy of diplomatic balance among the various Italian states fostered close cultural and professional relationships between Florence and the major Italian courts, including the Aragonese court of Naples. From the mid-1470s onward, a number of Tuscan sculptors and architects, and to a lesser extent painters with a more modern artistic sensibility, began arriving in the city.

The key work marking the transition from the hybrid Late Angevin and Catalan styles was the church of Monteoliveto. Originally founded under Ladislaus, the church was extensively remodelled during the final quarter of the century with the arrival of figures such as Antonio Rossellino and the brothers Benedetto and Giuliano da Maiano.

Of the three, Giuliano left the most enduring mark on the capital and was rewarded with the offices of royal architect and military engineer. He has been credited with the royal villas of Poggioreale, La Conigliera, La Ferrandina, and Villa Duchesca. In the military sphere, he designed Porta Capuana and Porta Nolana, while in religious architecture he was responsible at Monteoliveto for both the architectural spaces and sculptural decoration of the Piccolomini Chapel and the Tolosa Chapel. These chapels constitute some of the most accomplished examples of Florentine Renaissance architecture outside Florence itself. Their compositional proportions are carefully balanced and reflect a distinctly Brunelleschian conception of space, achieved through the subdivision of the interior into clear and manageable modules and sub-modules.

Giuliano da Maiano thus became a point of reference for the generation of architects active during the latter half of the century. Private commissions were also significant, including that of Angelo Como for the expansion and modernisation of Palazzo Como. The authorship of the project has been disputed with Antonio Fiorentino della Cava, another Tuscan architect. Fiorentino della Cava has also been credited with the earliest interventions at Santa Caterina a Formiello.

Meanwhile, court intellectuals such as Giovanni Pontano relied upon the services of other distinguished Tuscan architects and sculptors. At the same time, figures of the calibre of Francesco di Giorgio Martini, who also designed defensive works for the bastioned citadel of Castel Nuovo, and Giovanni Giocondo appeared in Naples. The authorship of the Pontano Chapel has likewise been disputed between these two architects. Fra Giocondo completed the Villa of Poggioreale after Giuliano da Maiano's death. For centuries, the villa remained the principal Renaissance architectural enterprise in Naples.

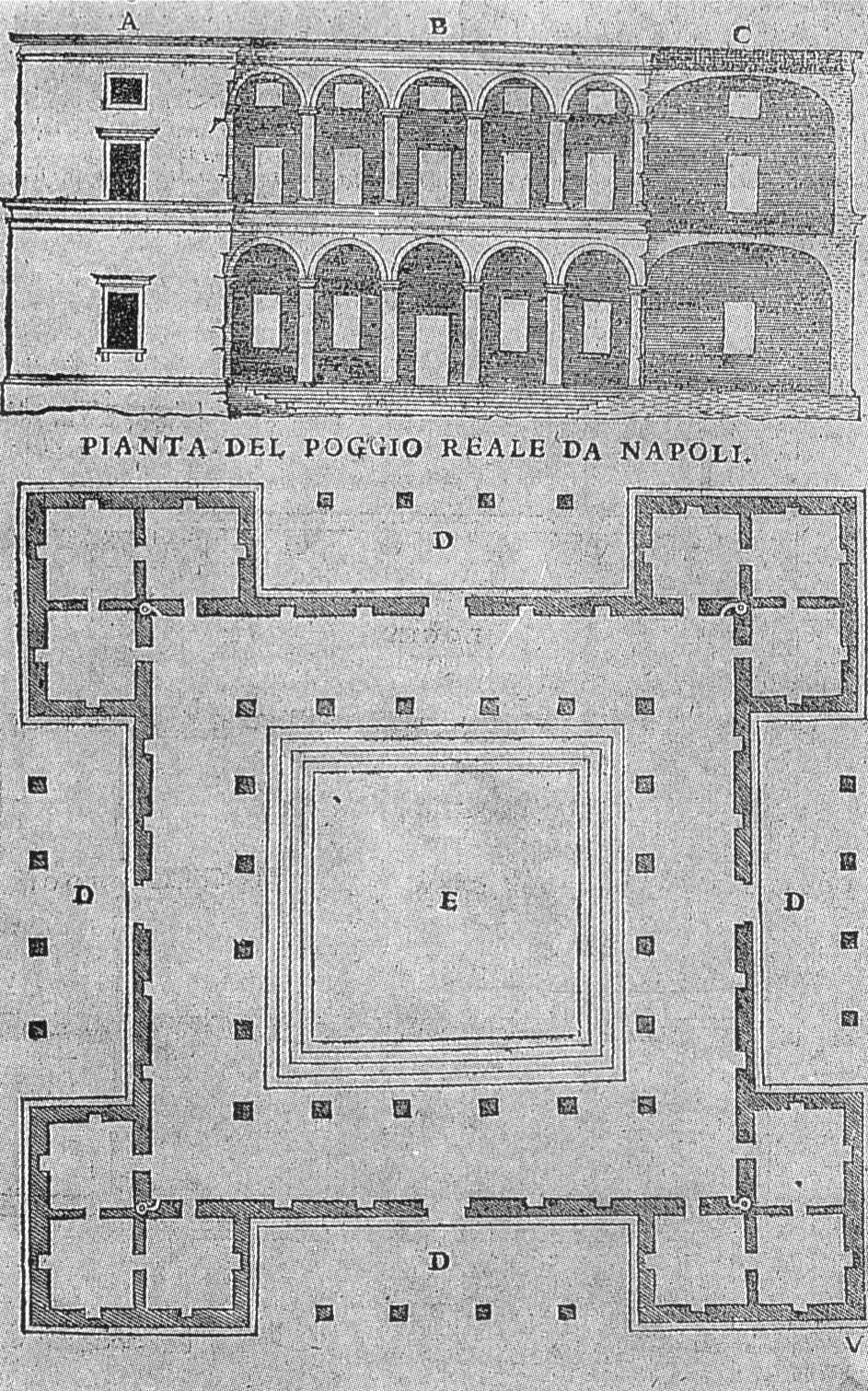
Plan and sectional drawing of the Poggio Reale villa.

The royal residence was visited by renowned architects such as Baldassare Peruzzi, who left several plan drawings of the complex, now preserved in the Uffizi collection of drawings and prints. The quality of the project was praised by Sebastiano Serlio in his architectural treatises. Serlio also provided a highly idealised representation of the villa's plan. The residence followed the model of a Florentine pleasure villa, organised around a central courtyard located below ground level and accessible only by means of a continuous staircase.

In his study of Neapolitan Renaissance architecture, Roberto Pane documented part of a building that was probably used as guest accommodation for the large residence. No traces of it survive today due to extensive wartime bombing and subsequent urban redevelopment of the area. The complex was completed by celebrated gardens featuring elaborate waterworks and extending towards the sea through a hunting grove. These gardens were designed by Fra Giocondo with the assistance of Pacello da Mercogliano. Both men were taken from the Poggioreale building site during the invasion of Charles VIII of France in 1495 and introduced at the French court the new concept of the Italian garden then developing in Italy. Alongside other artists and craftsmen active in Naples, including the sculptor Guido Mazzoni, they contributed to the spread of Italian classical culture and to the development of the French Renaissance.

The pleasure residences of Alfonso, Duke of Calabria, were also important for the architectural language of their façades. At La Conigliera, piperno stone was extensively employed for the masonry, while marble was used for window surrounds. This bichromatic decorative approach became characteristic of new construction projects until the opening decades of the sixteenth century. The combination of the two materials stemmed from the fact that piperno was not suitable for producing sharply carved ornamentation. Marble therefore served to emphasise architectural members even when their projections were only modestly pronounced.

Also fundamental during this period was the brief presence of Giuliano da Sangallo at Ferrante's court. The king requested that Lorenzo de' Medici provide him with a capable architect to design a magnificent royal residence that could replace the medieval structure of Castel Nuovo. The choice fell upon Sangallo, who in 1488 supplied both the design and a model of the palace. The architect's autograph drawing still survives and is preserved in the Biblioteca Barberini.

Although not centrally planned, the building was organised within a square layout. At its centre, the available space was used to accommodate a true amphitheatre with stepped seating, served by four staircases. This solution may have been inspired by the covered courtyard of Poggioreale. Overall, Sangallo's immense project was intended to surpass every other secular building of the fifteenth century in scale. According to Roberto Pane, in his study of the Neapolitan Renaissance, Sangallo's design displays a complexity that anticipates the work of Palladio. Similarities with the Neapolitan project can also be identified in a contemporary but unexecuted design for the Scala della Gherardesca family in Florence. There too, Sangallo adopted a highly open palatial scheme centred on a courtyard closely comparable to that planned for Ferrante.

=== Aragonese urban planning ===
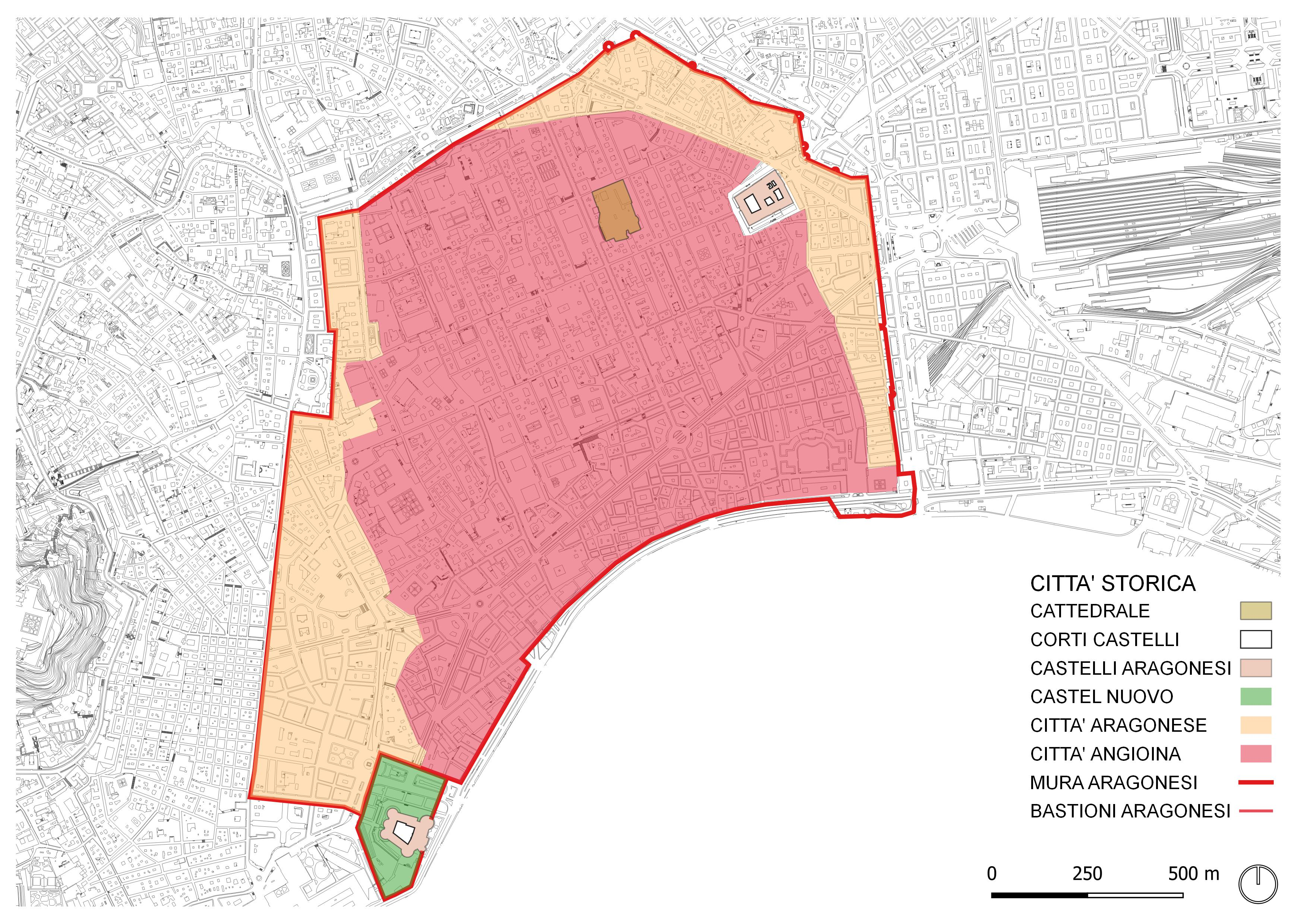
Extent of Aragonese Naples (highlighted in light yellow)

The capital of the kingdom underwent no major urban transformations during the transition from the Angevin to the Aragonese dynasty. Angevin Naples was still structured upon its Greco-Roman and Byzantine-Ducal foundations. The city's role as a major commercial centre had steadily grown throughout the fourteenth century, and by that time it had a population of approximately sixty thousand inhabitants.

With the consolidation of Aragonese rule, particularly under Ferrante I, privileges were granted to both local and foreign merchants, including Spaniards, Genoese, Florentines, and Milanese. The resulting economic and urban renewal led to a doubling of the population by the end of the fifteenth century, reaching approximately one hundred thousand inhabitants. This demographic growth required a major reorganisation of the capital, which expanded its built-up area by approximately two hundred hectares (two square kilometres). The city's overall defensive system was redesigned through a substantial enlargement of the city walls, incorporating all the land northwest of Castel Nuovo and extending eastward towards the countryside of Poggioreale. Evidence of these defensive extensions survives in the remains of towers located between Via Rossaroll and the Carmine Castle.

The project for the renewal of the city's defensive system was entrusted to Giuliano da Maiano, who designed the new Porta Capuana and oversaw the relocation of the old Porta Forcella, which became Porta Nolana. The eastern expansion was also made possible by the reclamation of the marshlands of Sant'Anna and Poggioreale. These lands were subsequently transformed into what became known as the city's vegetable garden. The process was further encouraged by the construction of two royal residences: the Duchesca, located behind Castel Capuano within the defensive perimeter, and the Villa of Poggio Reale, situated just outside Porta Capuana.

The reorganisation of the military citadel of Castel Nuovo was entrusted to the prominent architect and military engineer Francesco di Giorgio Martini. The extension of the city's defences towards the northwest is also likely attributable to him.

=== Neapolitan painting ===
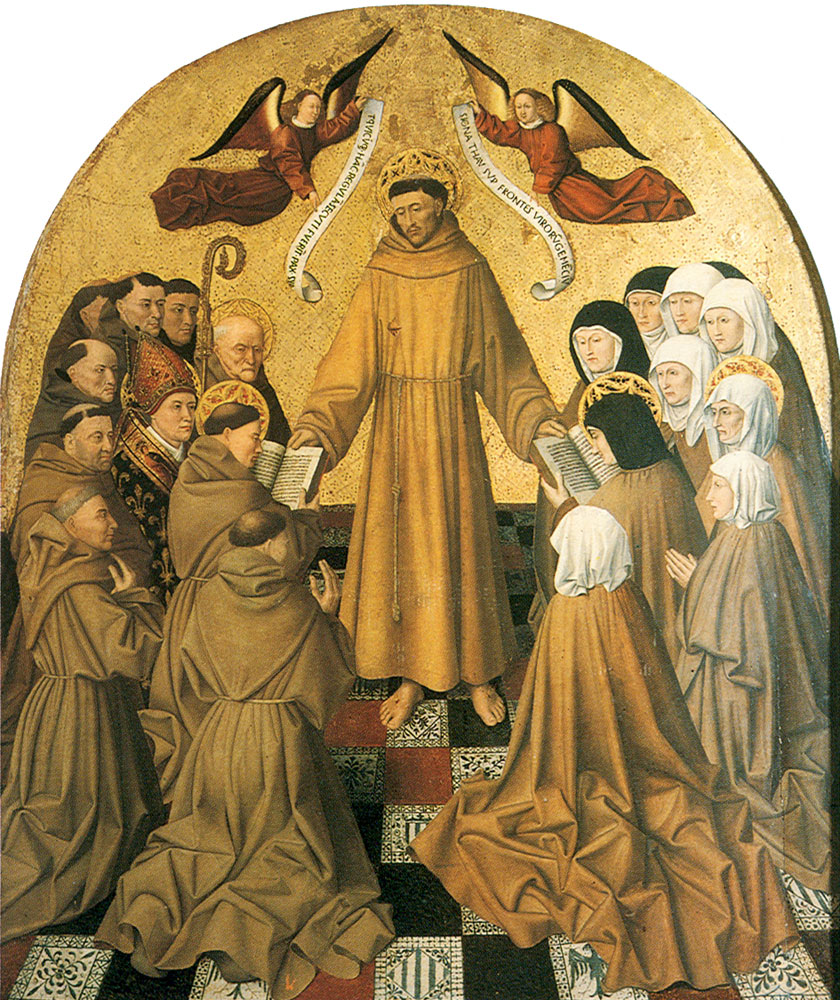
Delivery of the Franciscan Rule, Museo di Capodimonte, Naples

The development of Neapolitan and southern Italian painting was profoundly influenced by the cultural position of Burgundy during the fifteenth century, which served as a link between northern Europe and the Mediterranean world. Equally important was the character of Flemish naturalism, which was receptive to the varied appearances of reality and did not shy away from depicting splendour and wealth. As a result, it could be more readily accepted by European courts.

Its diffusion was aided by the commercial routes and political-military strategies established during the final Angevin period and later reinforced by Alfonso of Aragon. French rule contributed to the introduction into the capital of fashions and artistic styles originating in France, particularly from Provence. René of Anjou, regarded as one of the great patrons of his age, actively promoted Flemish and Burgundian artistic innovations. During his reign, Colantonio received his training and subsequently became the principal reference point for southern Italian painting during the second half of the fifteenth century. In Colantonio's work, Flemish influences were fully assimilated, so much so that Pietro Summonte, in his famous letter, explicitly referred to such influences and connected them to formative travels undertaken by the artist.

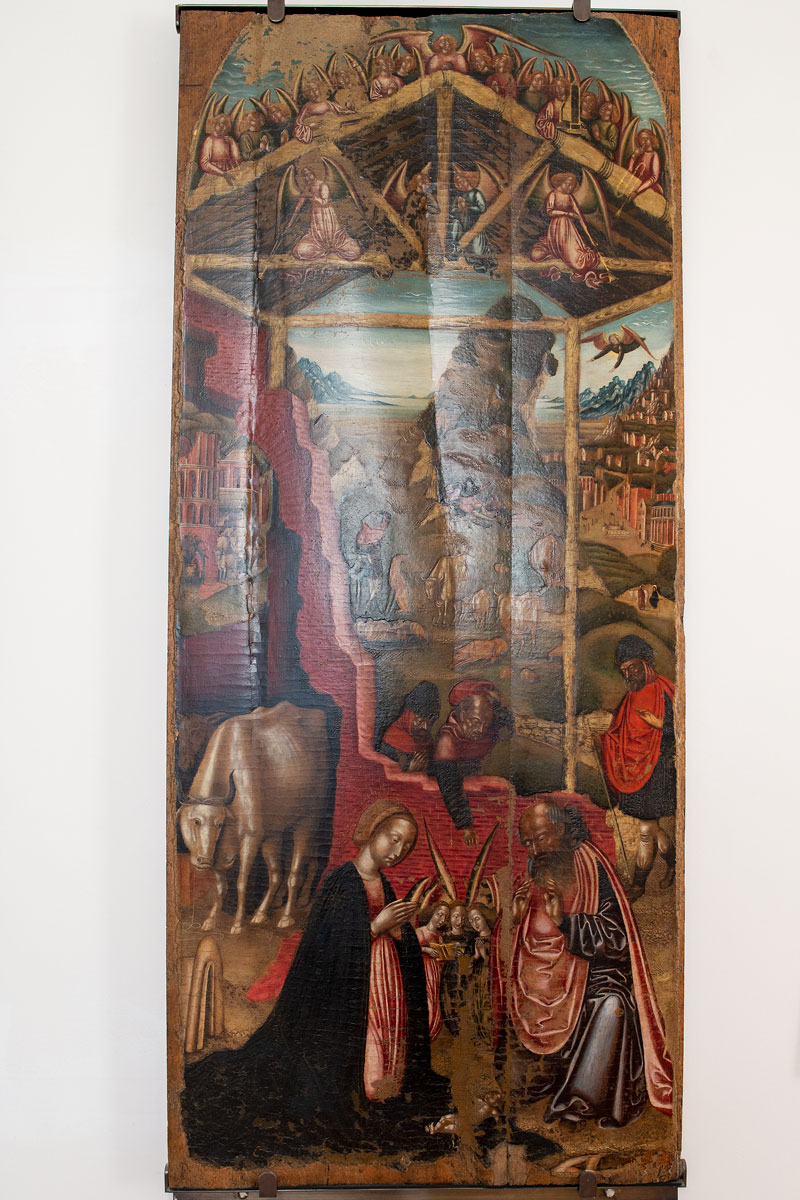
Unknown Catalan master, Adoration of the Shepherds, National Museum of San Martino, Naples

The transition from Angevin to Aragonese rule confirmed a tendency common among many European courts, which perceived a continuity of style and taste between International Gothic and Flemish painting, often overlooking developments in contemporary Italian painting. It is therefore unsurprising that works by Flemish masters such as Jan van Eyck and Rogier van der Weyden circulated within the kingdom. Together with Catalan and Valencian influences, they played a significant role in Colantonio's artistic education and maturation. These influences are clearly visible in Delivery of the Franciscan Rule and in his interpretation of the theme of Saint Jerome in His Study, both originally forming part of the polyptych for San Lorenzo Maggiore and now preserved in the Museo di Capodimonte.

The most representative painter of fifteenth-century southern Italy was Antonello da Messina. Trained in Colantonio's workshop, he absorbed the Flemish influences evident in his portraits and early works around the middle of the century. Unlike his master, however, he went a step further by assimilating the artistic culture of central Italy and Florence, drawing upon the examples of Verrocchio, Masaccio, and the theories of perspective developed by Piero della Francesca. A notable example is his Saint Jerome in His Study of 1475, in which the essential and naturalistic language characteristic of Flemish painting is combined with the sophisticated perspective and spatial representation typical of Italian art.

In addition to Antonello da Messina, Colantonio's workshop produced other painters, less well known today but equally representative of that cultural climate, including Angiolillo Arcuccio and Buono de' Buoni.

Meanwhile, as a result of the continuous cultural exchanges between the Aragonese crown and Lorenzo the Magnificent, painters entirely removed from local artistic traditions arrived in Naples. Their presence marked a decisive break with previous pictorial practices and signalled a shift towards a more classical interpretation of artistic themes, a tendency that would become firmly established during the following century. Alongside local artists worked the brothers Pietro and Ippolito del Donzello, who were employed on civil commissions for the royal family. They were followed by numerous pupils and collaborators who contributed to the dissemination of these new artistic currents.

=== The emergence of local sculptors and architects trained in Humanist taste ===
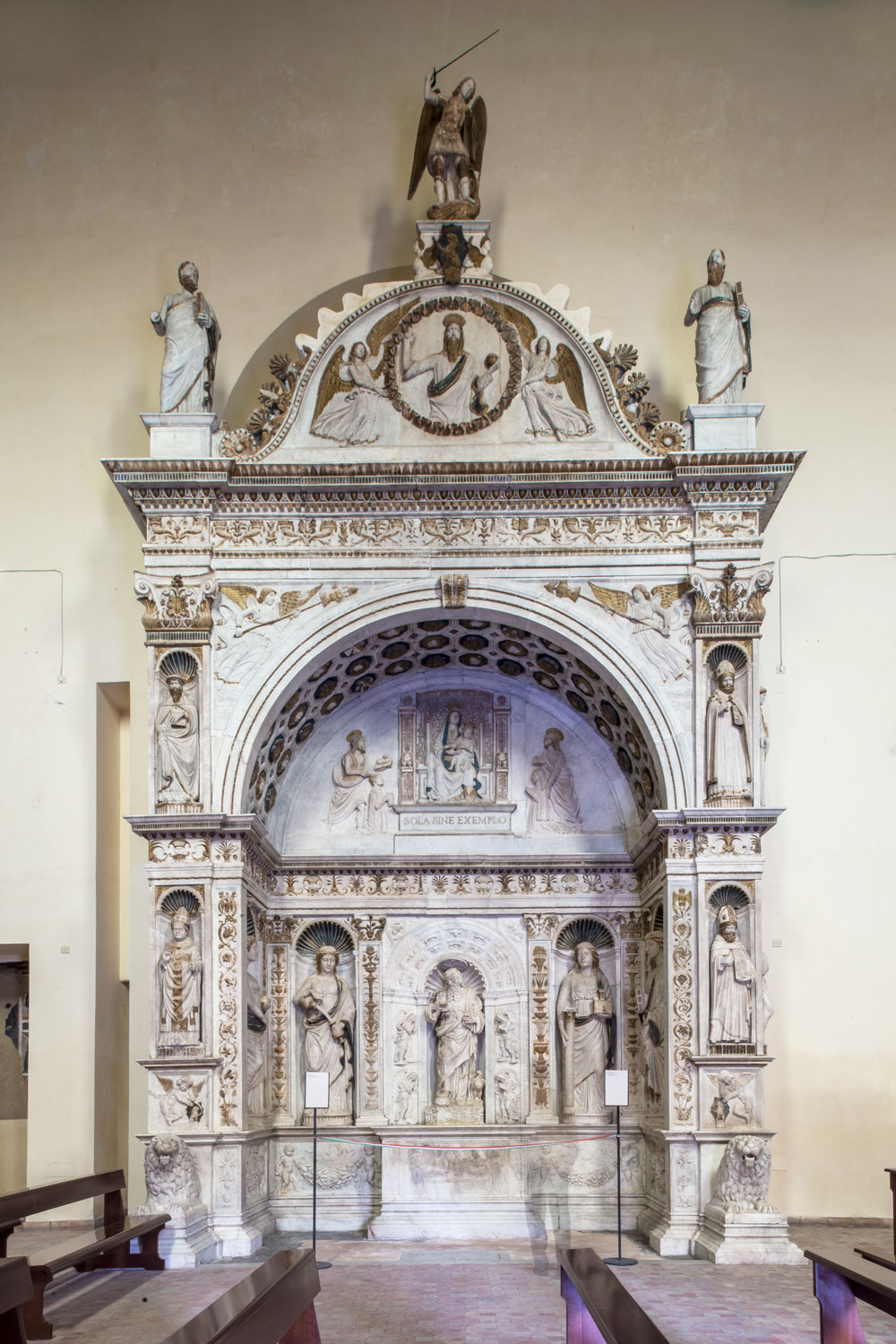
Jacopo della Pila and Tommaso Malvito, Miroballo Chapel in San Giovanni a Carbonara

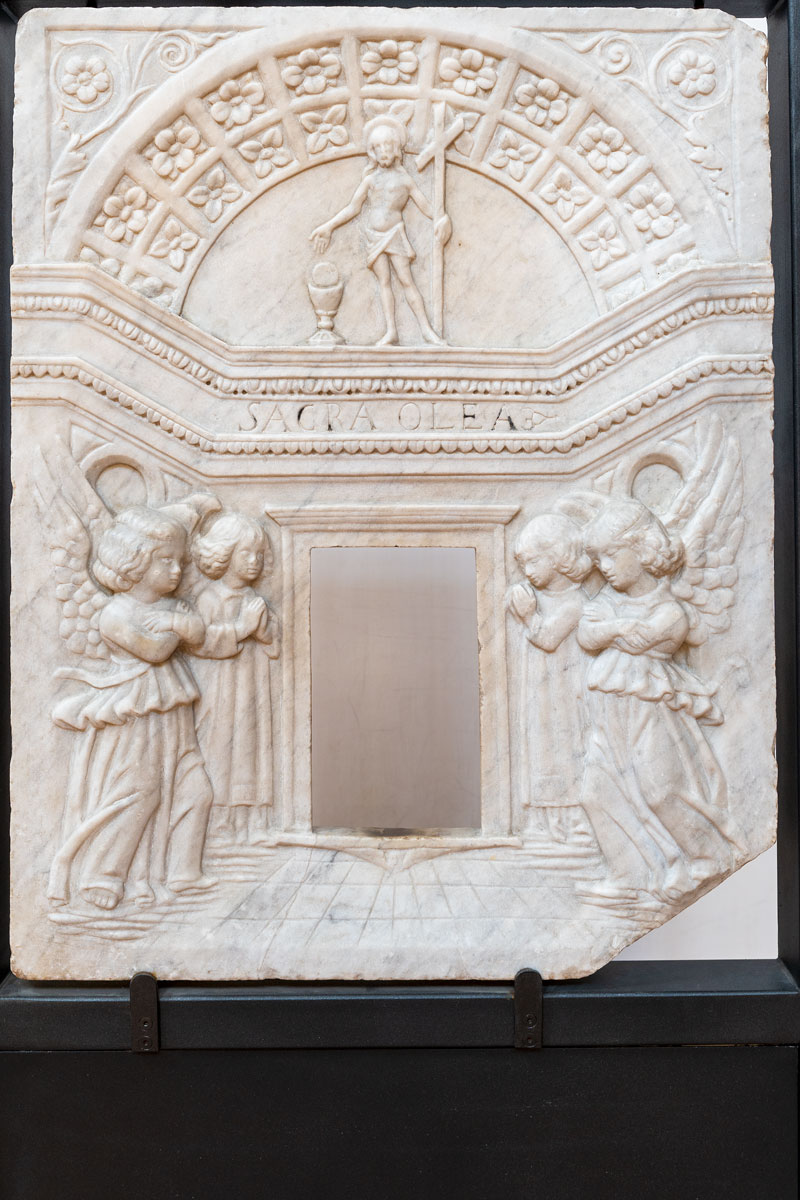
Marble tabernacle, second half of the fifteenth century, executed by sculptors working in the style of Jacopo della Pila. Museum of the Opera of San Lorenzo Maggiore

The arrival of Florentine and Lombard masters, who acted as pioneers of new artistic trends, rapidly spread throughout the kingdom, particularly among the princely courts, which felt the need to ingratiate themselves with the new ruling dynasty. Following the first attempts at artistic renewal represented by the portals of Palazzo Petrucci and Palazzo Diomede Carafa, executed by the earliest local sculptors, the final years of the seventh decade of the century witnessed the appearance of local sculptors and architects fully trained in these new tendencies, while nevertheless retaining elements derived from earlier Catalan artistic traditions.

A significant development occurred in 1484, when the presence of the Como-born sculptor Tommaso Malvito began to be documented in Naples, coinciding with the arrival of Giuliano da Maiano. Although Malvito has not yet been discussed in detail, he may be considered among the formative figures of the local artistic environment, not so much because of his foreign training or his close collaboration with Francesco Laurana on the cathedral of Marseille and at Castel Nuovo, but because he established in Naples one of the most productive workshops for the training of local artists educated in Florentine and Milanese, or Bramantesque, culture. This workshop also involved his son Giovan Tommaso Malvito and contributed significantly to the maturation of local Renaissance styles during the first three decades of the following century.

The development of local architectural and sculptural personalities cannot be understood without considering the legacy of Franco-Provençal and Catalan artistic traditions. Particularly important was the substantial community of stonecutters, master builders, and craftsmen originating from Cava de' Tirreni and the Irno Valley. In addition to the already well-known Onofrio de Giordano, who gradually rose from master builder to become a respected engineer and architect in Ragusa in Croatia through the intense cultural exchanges between the Kingdom of Naples and the Adriatic cities, and to his successor Francesco de Giordano, who honourably continued the family activity, figures such as Novello de Paparo and Novello da San Lucano also deserve mention.

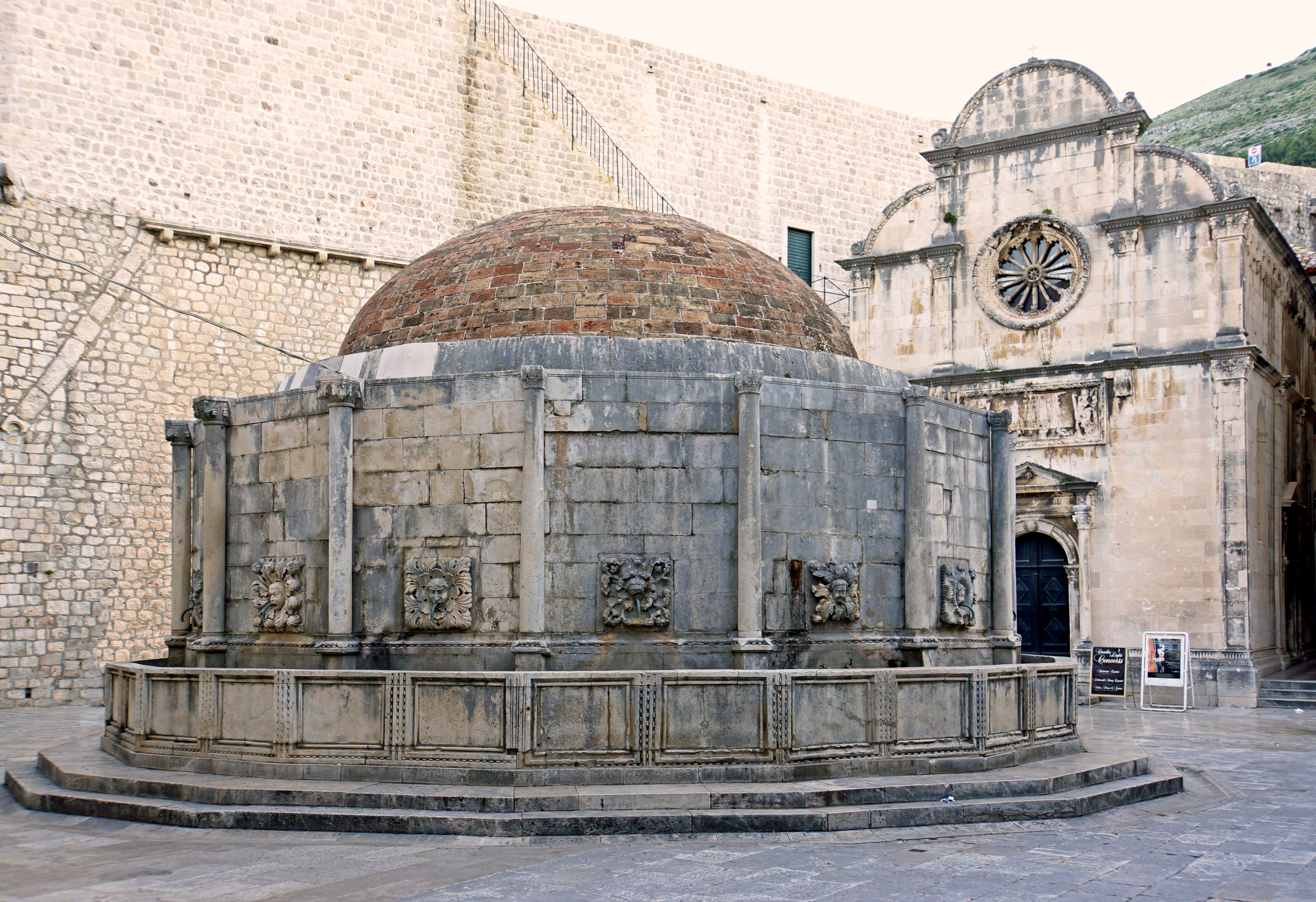
Onofrio de Giordano, Onofrio Fountain (Dubrovnik, Croatia)

Little is known about Novello de Paparo because of the loss of original archival documentation from the Aragonese period. Knowledge of his activity derives largely from partial transcriptions of those records. He was born in the plain of the Sele, specifically in Eboli, and began his career as a master builder before specialising and developing as an architect, a stage of his career for which documentation becomes more abundant.

As early as 1472, he appears as the trusted architect of the Pignatelli family in a dispute with the Lombard sculptor Pietro de Martino concerning the construction of a funerary monument in San Domenico Maggiore. Between 1475 and 1476, he was involved in supplying building materials for the hospital of the Annunziata and for works at Castel Capuano. In 1479, according to documents transcribed by Filangieri di Satriano, he married Agata di San Barbato, sister of a prominent Neapolitan citizen. This marriage facilitated his gradual social and professional advancement, exemplifying the Renaissance process through which the liberal professions gained autonomy from manual trades by means of specialised education and social mobility.

In 1488, he reappeared as the representative of Scipione Pandone in the purchase of a house that later became Palazzo Conca. From the late 1480s onward, he is once again documented working for the Aragonese court, evidence of the considerable social and economic standing he had achieved. He participated in projects at Castel Capuano and at the Conigliera in the Cavone district.

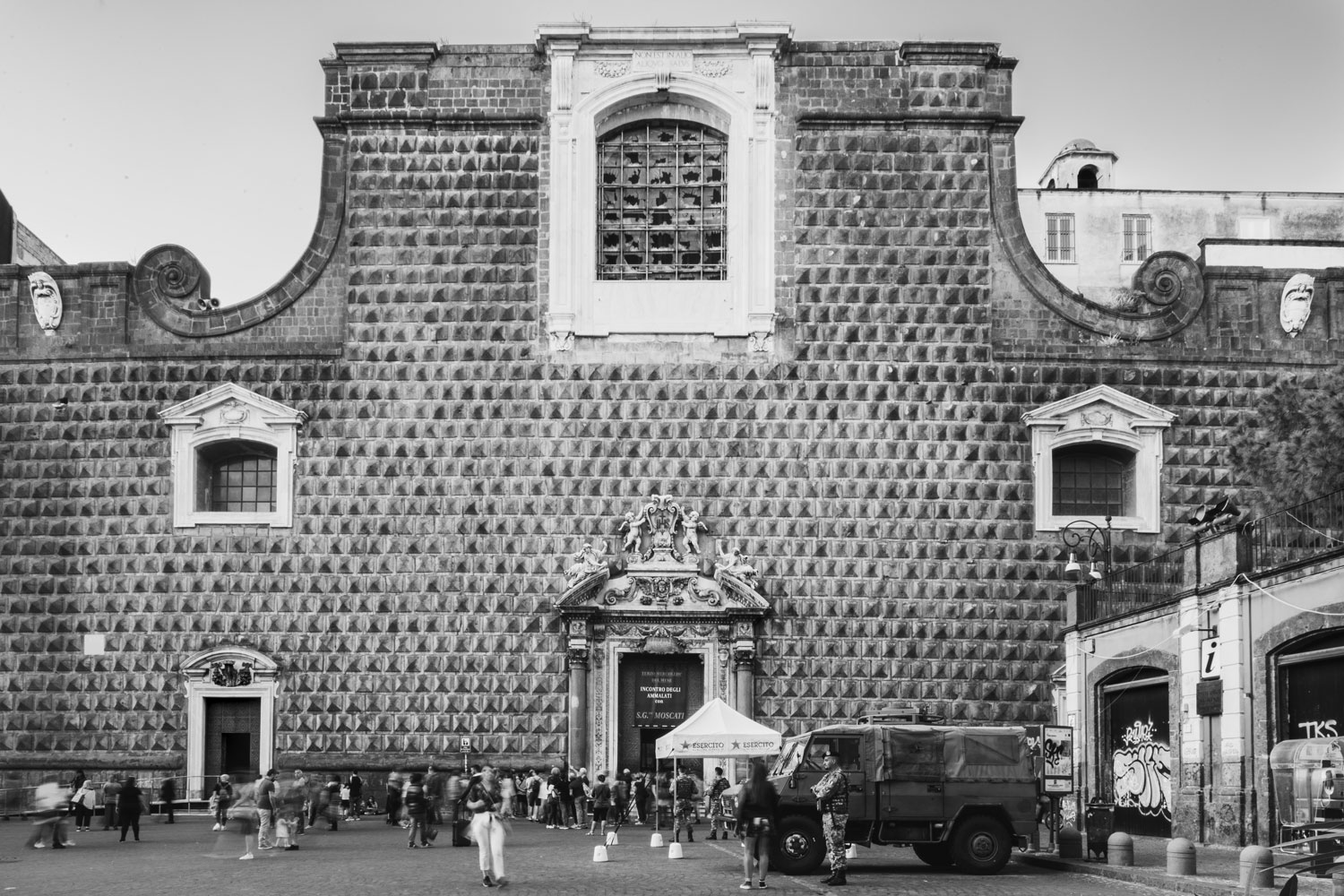
Novello da San Lucano, Palazzo Sanseverino, now the Gesù Nuovo church

Information regarding Novello da San Lucano is similarly fragmentary due to the destruction of the Aragonese archives. Nevertheless, he is best known among scholars for having left a lasting mark through the façade of Palazzo Sanseverino, his most celebrated work. Having entered religious life as a friar, he contributed significantly to the artistic renewal of the kingdom through his awareness of developments across the Mediterranean and his participation in extensive cultural exchanges.

The façade of Palazzo Sanseverino became a clear demonstration of these influences, combining contacts from the Adriatic region with elements derived from earlier Catalan traditions, such as the toroidal base moulding, and with contemporary Milanese experiences under the Sforza that had come into contact with Filarete. The introduction of bossage into Campanian architecture represented a major innovation. Its precedents can be found in the circular towers of the Sforza Castle, from which the motif gradually spread beginning in the 1460s through the Neapolitan residence of the House of Sanseverino. It later appeared in buildings such as Palazzo Bevilacqua in Bologna (1472–1482) and the Palazzo dei Diamanti (1493), facilitated in part by delicate political alliances between the kingdom and the states of central and northern Italy.

A second building displaying similar characteristics was constructed in the Selleria district, but no trace of it survives today following the demolitions carried out during the Risanamento of Naples.

=== The transitional phase into the new century and the emergence of Giovan Francesco Mormando ===
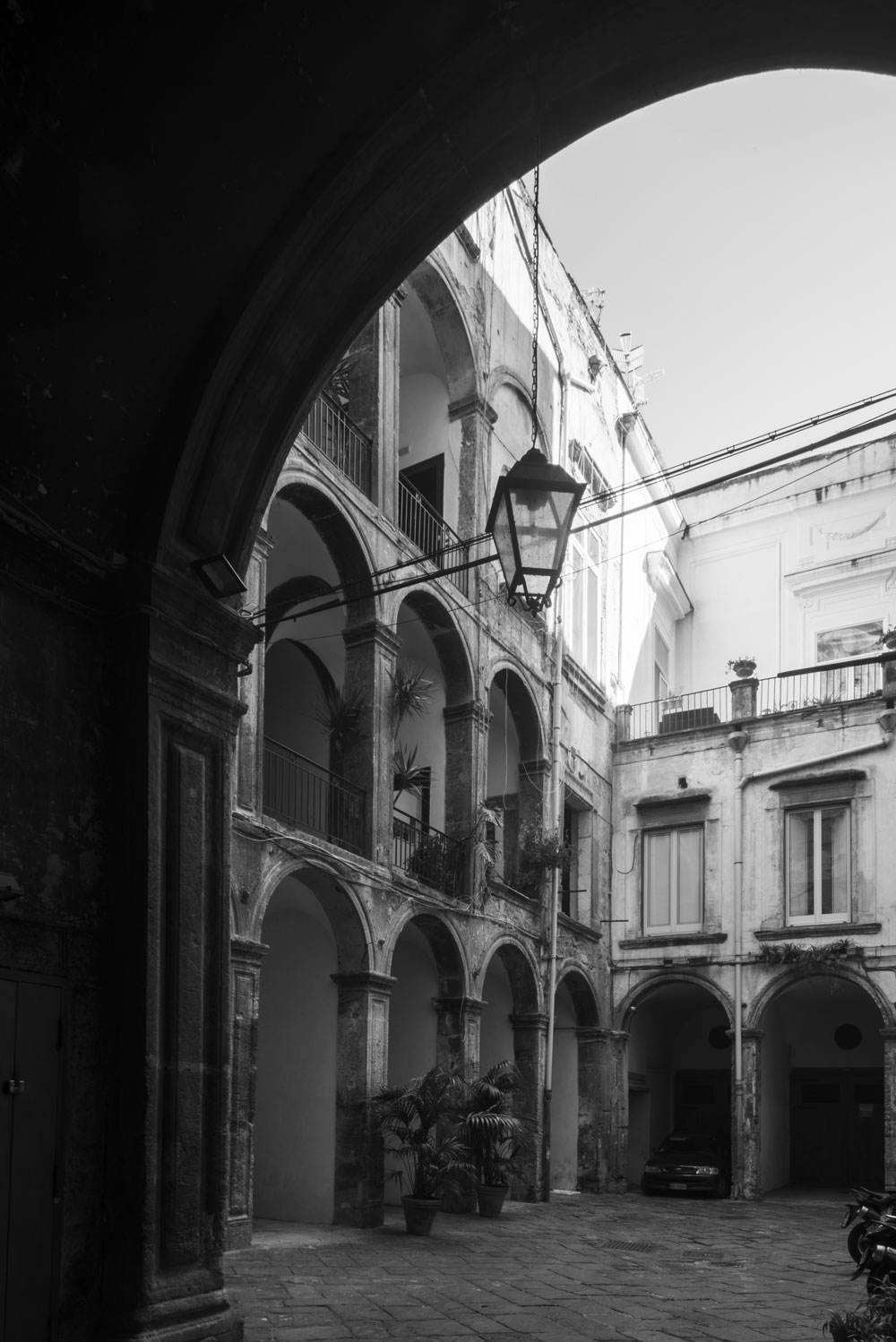
Example of a late fifteenth-century courtyard in the historic centre, Palazzo delle Cinque Arcate

Towards the end of the fifteenth century, the cultural vitality of Naples and the kingdom as a whole reached its peak, aided in part by the outcome of the Conspiracy of the Barons, which strengthened the royal dynasty's control over the territory. Alongside the aforementioned figures of Novello da San Lucano and Novello de Paparo, other young protagonists emerged and continued along the path established by the first delegations of Tuscan and Lombard artists and architects invited to court. Many of these figures remain shrouded in historiographical obscurity, owing in large part to the extensive wartime destruction of the rich Aragonese archives once preserved in the State Archives. References to some of these individuals, albeit often embellished with hagiographic inventions, were recorded by De Dominici in his writings.

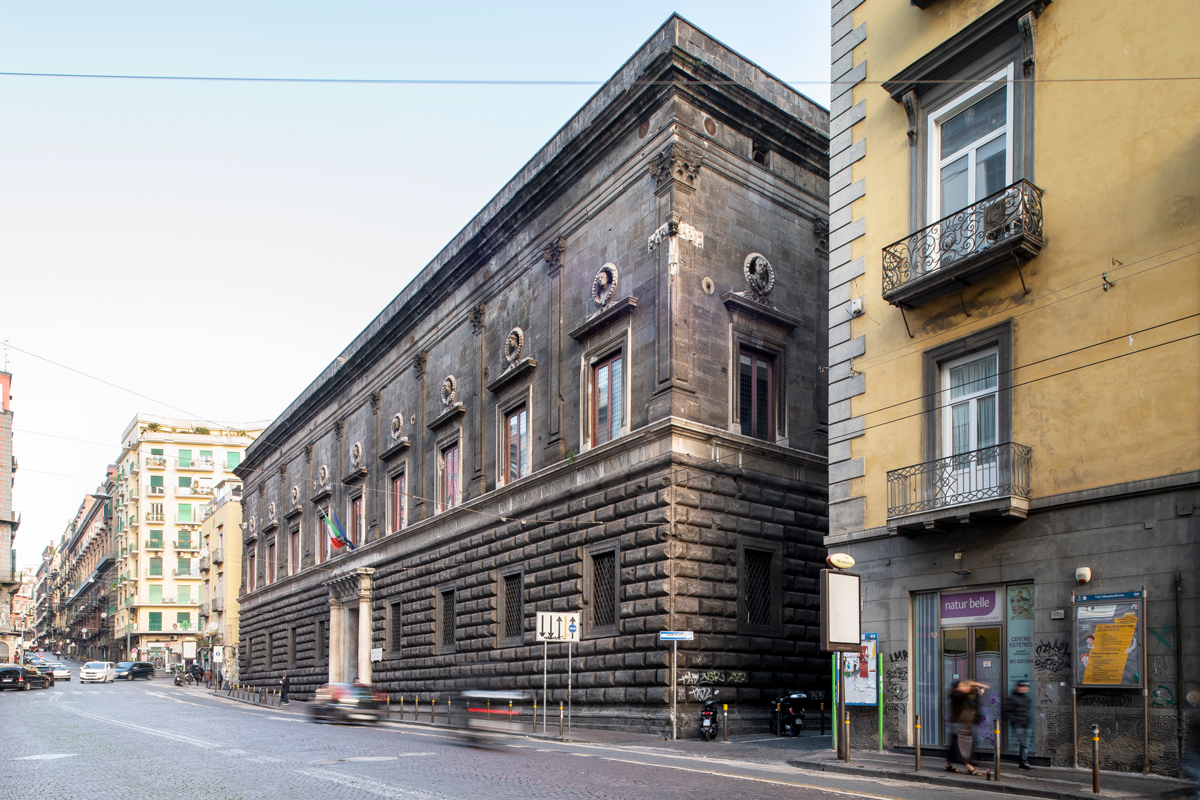
Gabriele d'Agnolo, Palazzo Orsini di Gravina

Two names in particular began to stand out: Gabriele Agnolo and Giovanni Francesco Mormando. Information concerning d'Agnolo is especially scarce. His first appearance in artistic historiography dates to the sixteenth century, when Benedetto di Falco wrote that “Gabriel d'Angelo, a Neapolitan, built with admirable skill the palace of the illustrious Duke of Gravina, with convenient lower rooms like the Palazzo Farnese in Rome at the Savelli court.” His work was later discussed, albeit not according to modern scholarly standards, by Bernardo de' Dominici in the following century.

Like Novello da San Lucano, d'Agnolo remained closely associated with his most celebrated work, Palazzo Orsini di Gravina. Although the building dates to the early decades of the sixteenth century, Roberto Pane regarded it as the last great work of the previous century because of its compositional characteristics, which are still resolved according to schemes not yet fully aligned with sixteenth-century Classicism.

The palace originally featured a C-shaped plan centred around a courtyard supported by a sequence of arches of the Tuscan order. On the opposite side of the courtyard, this arrangement was mirrored by a second level of blind arches of the Composite order, alternating with piperno-framed windows and white marble niches. Both the principal and side façades are horizontally articulated by a continuous marble entablature. The ground floor is treated with a rusticated piperno facing composed of cushion-shaped blocks interrupted only by the window frames, a characteristic inherited from fifteenth-century façade compositions.

The building may also be compared with the contemporary Palazzo Marigliano, for which Pane advanced the hypothesis that Giovanni Francesco Mormando may have been involved behind the otherwise obscure figure of d'Agnolo.

Giovan Francesco Mormando was the other key figure in the transition from purely fifteenth-century forms to the mature Renaissance. According to Roberto Pane, Mormando remained essentially an occasional architect and a highly regarded organ builder. On the basis of this observation, it is possible to reconstruct the complex training of the artist, who first worked as a master organ builder and subsequently, beginning in the 1480s, learned the principles of architecture as a pupil of Giuliano da Maiano.

This unusual combination of two apparently unrelated professions may have contributed significantly to Mormando's rapid rise as an architect. In fifteenth-century architectural theory, architecture was frequently associated with music through the mediation of the Neoplatonic philosophy of Marsilio Ficino. Particularly important in this regard was Mormando's construction of the organ for the Santa Maria della Pace in Rome, where he had the opportunity to observe the work of Bramante.

== 16th century ==
=== Giovanni Francesco Mormando ===
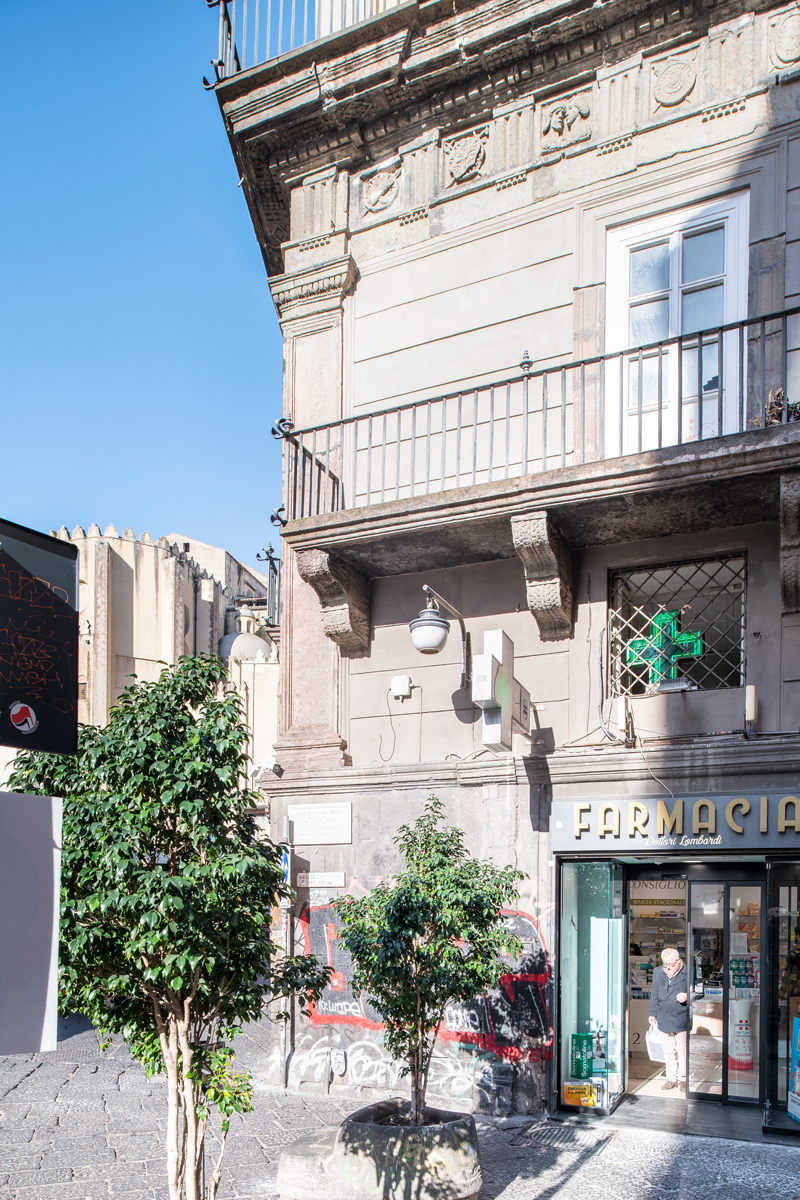
Corner detail of Palazzo Corigliano, formerly the palace of the Dukes of Vietri

As already mentioned in the previous section, the figure of Giovanni Francesco Mormando was of particular importance. The earliest evidence of his career as an architect of civil and religious buildings dates to the very beginning of the 16th century, when he obtained plots of land from the monastery of San Gregorio Armeno to build his own modest residence in the city centre. This first work did not display any particular signs of a fully developed architectural language. As it was probably a private residence intended for the architect himself, it likely did not require special compositional attention and was almost certainly the adaptation of a pre-existing building, as suggested by the presence of an arch in the Catalan style, a feature difficult to reconcile with the architect's later commissions for the Neapolitan aristocracy.

His complex training developed in several stages. The limited information available for this period suggests an initial apprenticeship under the elderly Giuliano da Maiano, where he had the opportunity to learn the methods and principles of the Tuscan and Albertian Renaissance. Alberti's presence in Naples has been reassessed and reconsidered by scholars of Neapolitan architecture because of his contribution to the development of mature Renaissance forms in southern Italy. Together with his encounter with Bramante, the most influential figure in Italian architecture at the turn of the century, these experiences shaped a personality that stood above most of the architects active in the capital at the time, leading nineteenth-century art historians, albeit inaccurately, to regard him as the founding figure of the Neapolitan Renaissance. Mormando's education enabled him to interpret critically the rapid changes that marked the end of the fifteenth century, a period dominated by the Florence of Lorenzo de' Medici, and the aftermath of the Italian Wars, which caused prolonged political instability throughout the Italian peninsula and, within a few decades, contributed to the decline of Renaissance culture within the framework of classicism.

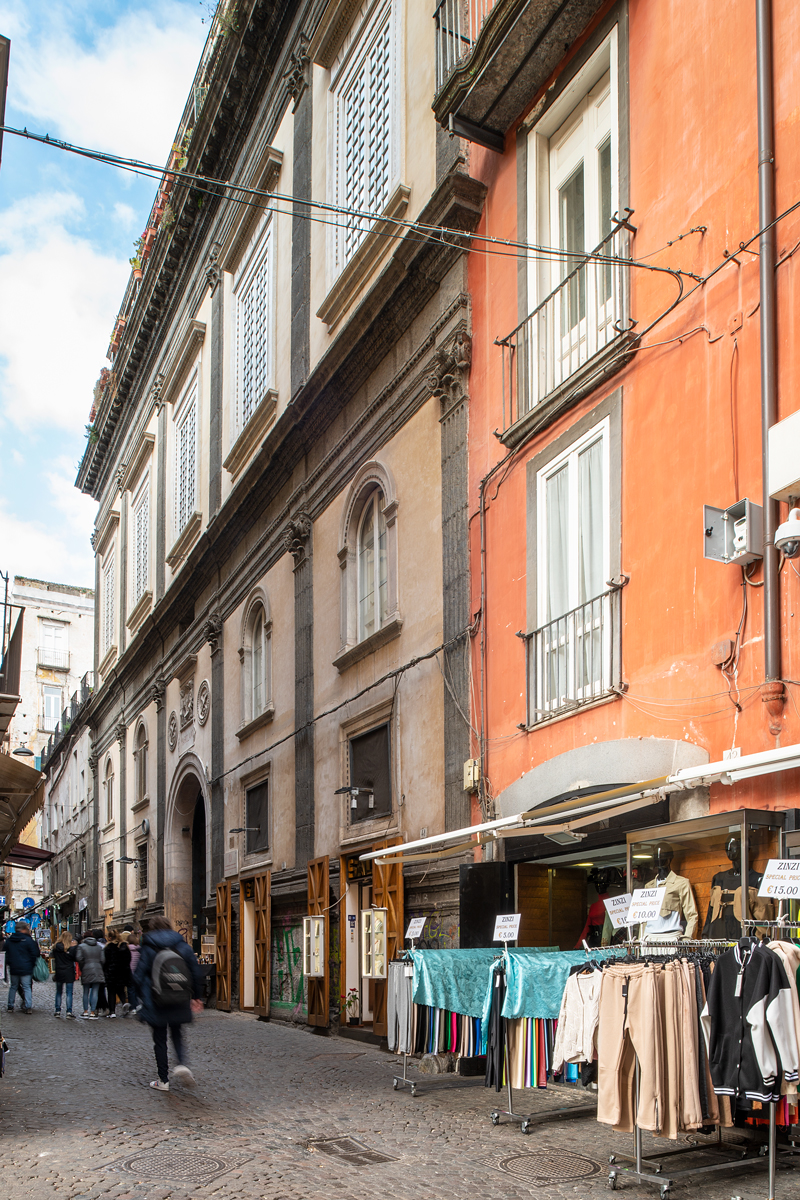
Palazzo di Capua, Mormando's sixteenth-century façade

Following his experience designing the Palazzo Acquaviva d'Atri on the steeply sloping site along Via Atri in Naples, of which the massive piperno base, parts of the courtyard, including the sequence of classical arches in the stables, and the principal staircase survive, Mormando further refined his architectural language. The palace underwent extensive Late Baroque alterations by Giuseppe Astarita, which compromised the overall Renaissance character of the grand princely residence of the Acquaviva family. Noteworthy in this early work, and a feature repeated in later projects, was the presence of a hanging garden reserved exclusively for the piano nobile.

With the Palace of the Dukes of Vietri, Mormando first demonstrated his ability to synthesise the most innovative architectural tendencies arriving from Rome, reaching a climax in the Doric entablature divided into metopes and triglyphs. This was a rare feature in contemporary Neapolitan architecture and can only be linked to experiences associated with Bramante, Baldassarre Peruzzi and Antonio da Sangallo the Younger.

Only a few elements of the original palace in Piazza San Domenico Maggiore survive to convey its former Renaissance splendour. A seventeenth-century painting, depicting the building before Baroque and Rococo alterations, reveals the typical appearance of Mormando's mature civil architecture: a high base supporting a sequence of Doric pilasters framing finely decorated piperno arched windows on the mezzanine level. The piano nobile repeated the underlying grid through a different architectural order, probably Corinthian, as later reconstructed in the eighteenth century. The composition was crowned by a powerful entablature whose frieze incorporated heraldic motifs associated with the noble family that owned the palace.

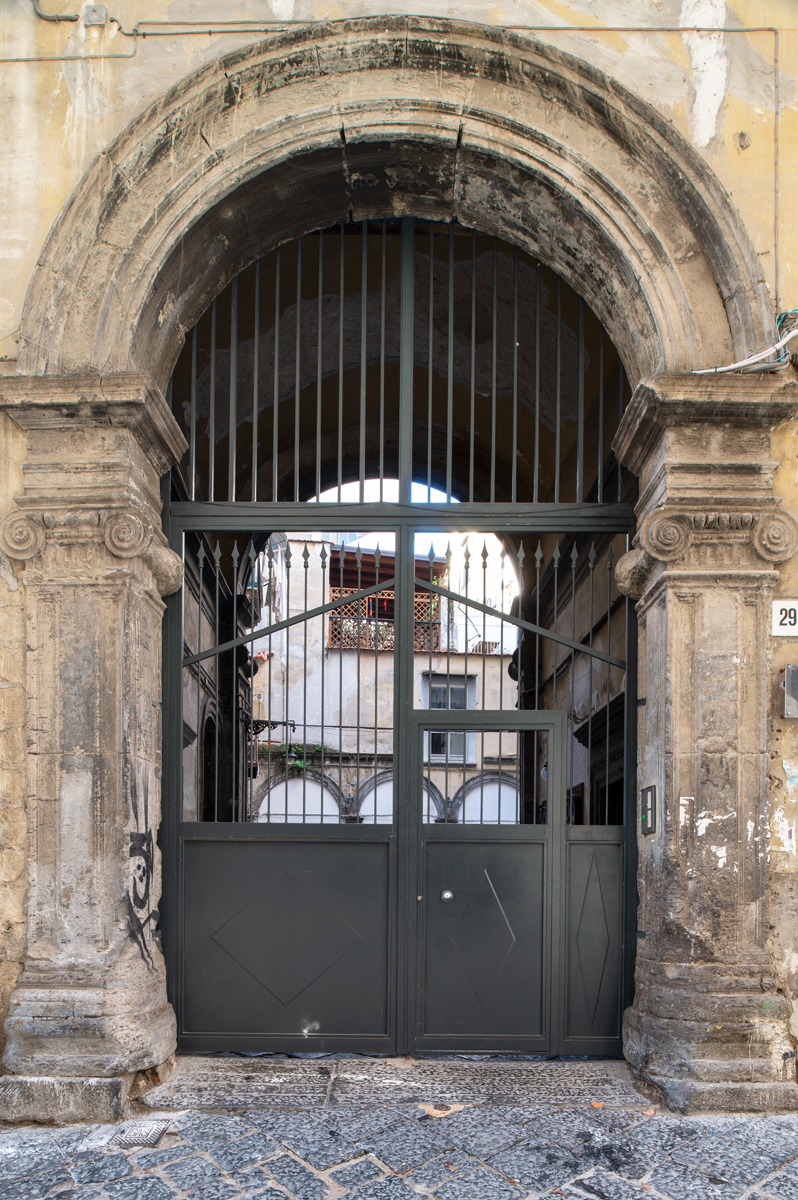
Palace in Via San Giovanni Maggiore dei Pignatelli, an example of a Mormandean portal

The palace in Piazza San Domenico served as a testing ground for Mormando's most representative architectural work, Palazzo di Capua. Constructed during the 1510s, it became the architect's most celebrated building in Naples. Consistently indebted to Albertian formal principles, Mormando organised the façade according to a classical arrangement consisting of a high piperno base with a crowning moulding, a first architectural order containing the mezzanine floor, a second order corresponding to the piano nobile, and a monumental cornice above. More clearly than in the palace at Piazza San Domenico, the background surface is distributed with impeccable proportional balance.

A narrow moulding composed of a cavetto and a flat band runs along the pilasters, the architrave and the base, framing the entire internal rectangle in order to emphasise its limits and soften the abrupt projection of the pilasters and entablature from the wall surface. To preserve the elegance of the façade on a street scarcely five metres wide, Mormando resorted to the device of optical inversion of structural logic. By reversing conventional visual expectations, the first storey appears lighter and more refined, while the second storey possesses greater plastic emphasis and robustness, seemingly bearing the heavy cornice almost independently of the structure below. This imaginative inversion appears intended to draw the observer's gaze upward.

Palazzo di Capua therefore represents the highest achievement of the Calabrian architect's synthetic language, bringing together the lessons of Alberti, the experiences acquired under Giuliano da Maiano, and the latest architectural developments from Rome and Bramante. Mormando's inventiveness extended beyond overall composition. Particularly noteworthy was the portal, now lost and replaced by a simple nineteenth-century marble frame. It consisted of two Ionic pillars supporting an entablature and a round arch. This type of portal, found in several surviving buildings in Naples, both by Mormando himself and by probable followers of his style, became the defining characteristic of the first two decades of the century.

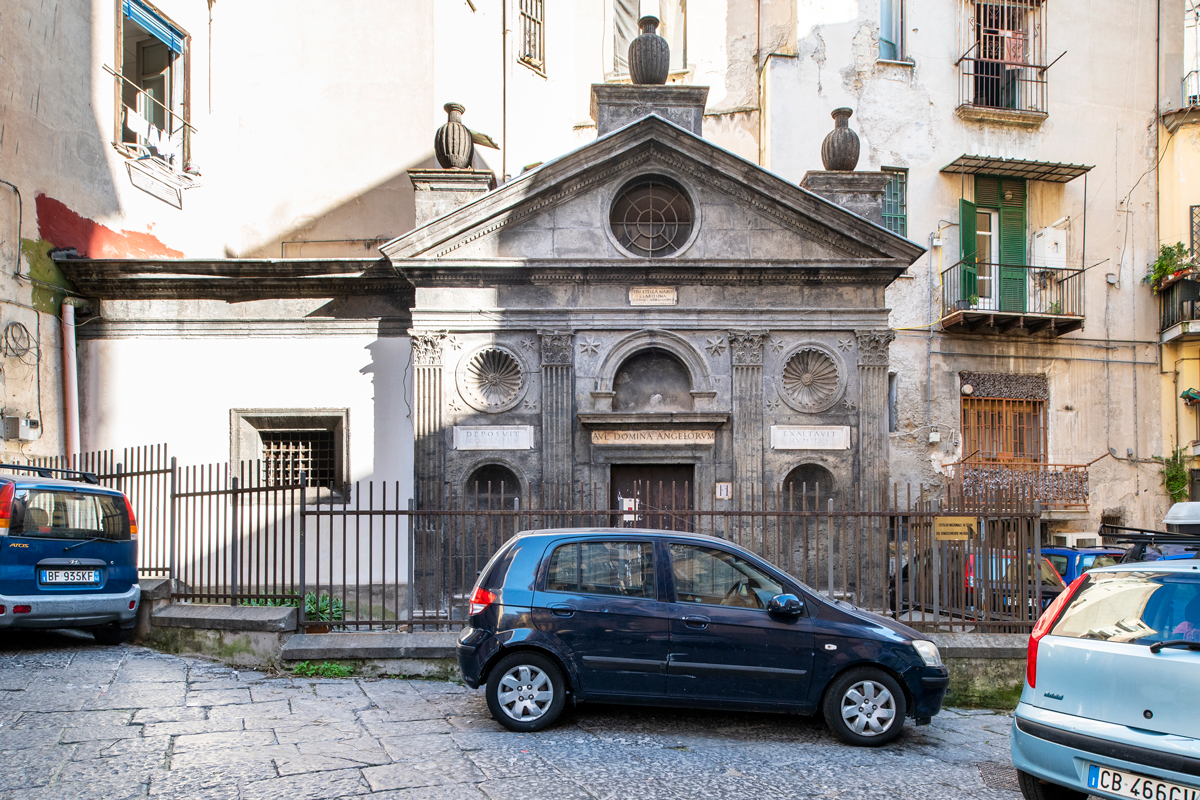
Santa Maria della Stella alle Paparelle – the last documented work by Mormando in Naples

Although Mormando's activity is chiefly associated with the renewal and stylistic transcendence of Florentine models in civil architecture, he also left a significant mark on sacred architecture. One of his earliest known works was the lower church of the Santi Severino e Sossio monastery, which is currently inaccessible to visitors. Dating from before 1537, it is considered one of the first churches in Naples built entirely in the Renaissance style.

The church consists of a central nave with side chapels only on the left side, while a corresponding sequence of shallow arches opens on the opposite side. Once again Mormando entrusted the decorative articulation of the architectural members to Piperno, achieving a strong chromatic balance. The original roof was probably a timber truss structure, later replaced by a barrel vault during the eighteenth century. An unusual feature for Neapolitan churches of the early sixteenth century is the use of paired architectural orders. In this case, the architect employed the Corinthian order, complete with pedestals, to achieve greater formal elegance. The keystones of the presbytery and chapels are particularly noteworthy and once again reveal the influence of Giuliano da Maiano; similar motifs can also be observed at Porta Capuana.

Mormando's other sacred masterpiece is the small private chapel of Santa Maria della Stella alle Paparelle. The façade, whose proportions were altered by the raising of street levels during the Risanamento, resembles a small Corinthian tetrastyle temple divided into three identical bays. The central bay contains an entablature-framed portal of Roman tradition approached by a small crepidoma and surmounted by a small lunette shrine. The two lateral bays each contain a niche surmounted by dedicatory inscriptions set into piperno blocks and rosettes centred on shell motifs of clear Bramantesque inspiration.

Like the Pontano Chapel, the interior is austere, contrasting with the richly articulated exterior executed entirely in piperno. The attribution of the Church of San Michele in Vibo Valentia, dated 1519, remains uncertain. Its façade incorporates compositional elements derived from Santa Maria della Stella while adapting them through the inclusion of motifs borrowed from civil architecture, such as the high pedestal supporting Ionic pilasters modelled on those of Palazzo di Capua. The interior, consisting of a single nave with side chapels, is articulated by paired Corinthian columns on pedestals in the same arrangement employed in the lower church of Santi Severino e Sossio.

No further works by Mormando are known after 1520. From that date onward, numerous followers, including Giovanni Francesco Di Palma, disseminated the Mormandean language throughout other centres of the viceroyalty, simultaneously marking both the final phase of sixteenth-century classicism and the emergence of Neapolitan architectural Mannerism, characterised by continuous direct and indirect references to Mormando.

=== Giovanni Merliani da Nola ===
[...] There now emerges in this city a young man, Giovanni of Nola, who was formerly a master of relief wood carving, in which he was highly esteemed. He has now devoted himself entirely to marble. He is working on a great marble tomb for the most illustrious lord Don Raimondo de Cardona, which is to be sent to Catalonia.

— Pietro Summonte, Letter to Marcantonio Michiel, 1524

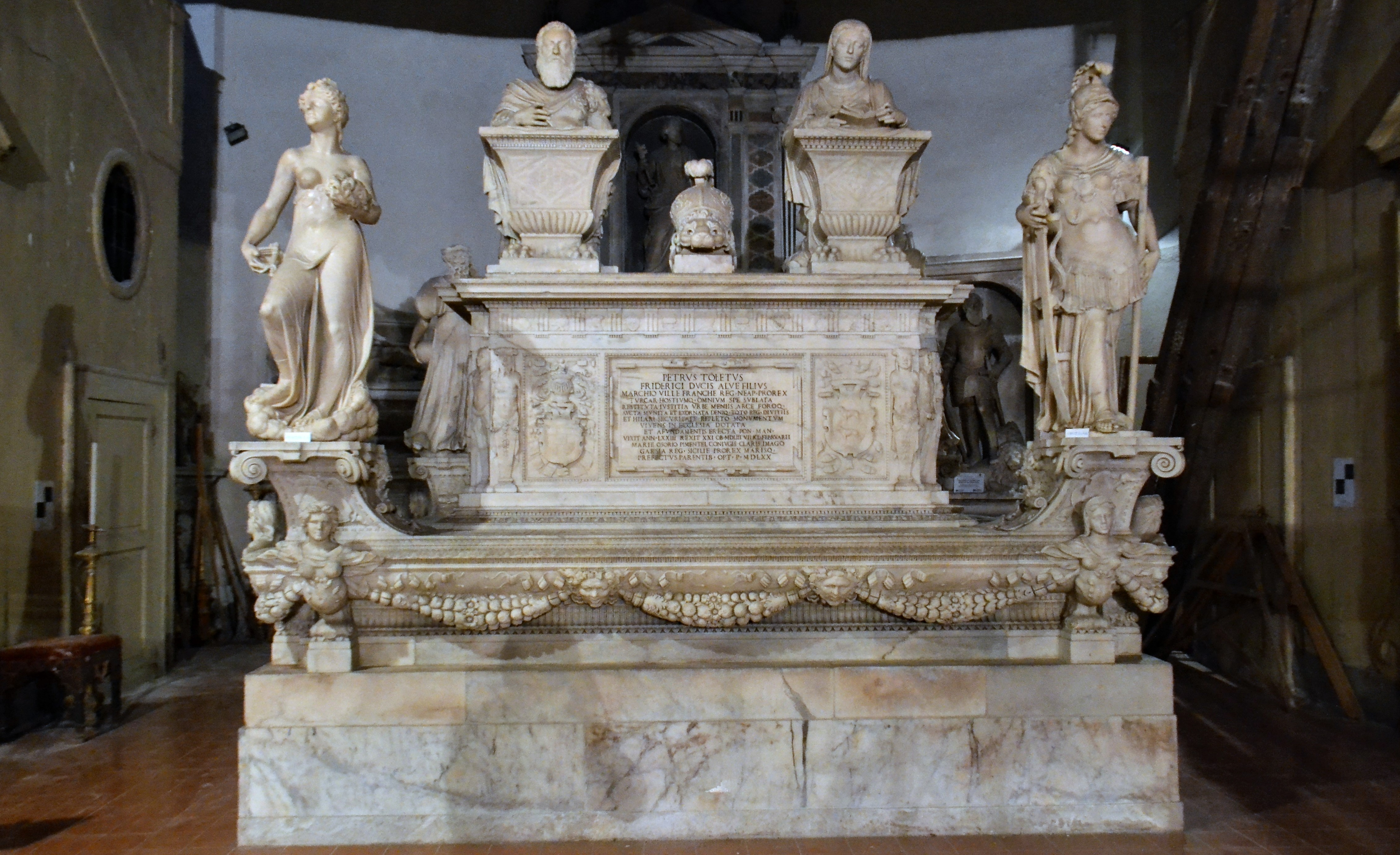
Tomb of Pedro de Toledo, San Giacomo degli Spagnoli.

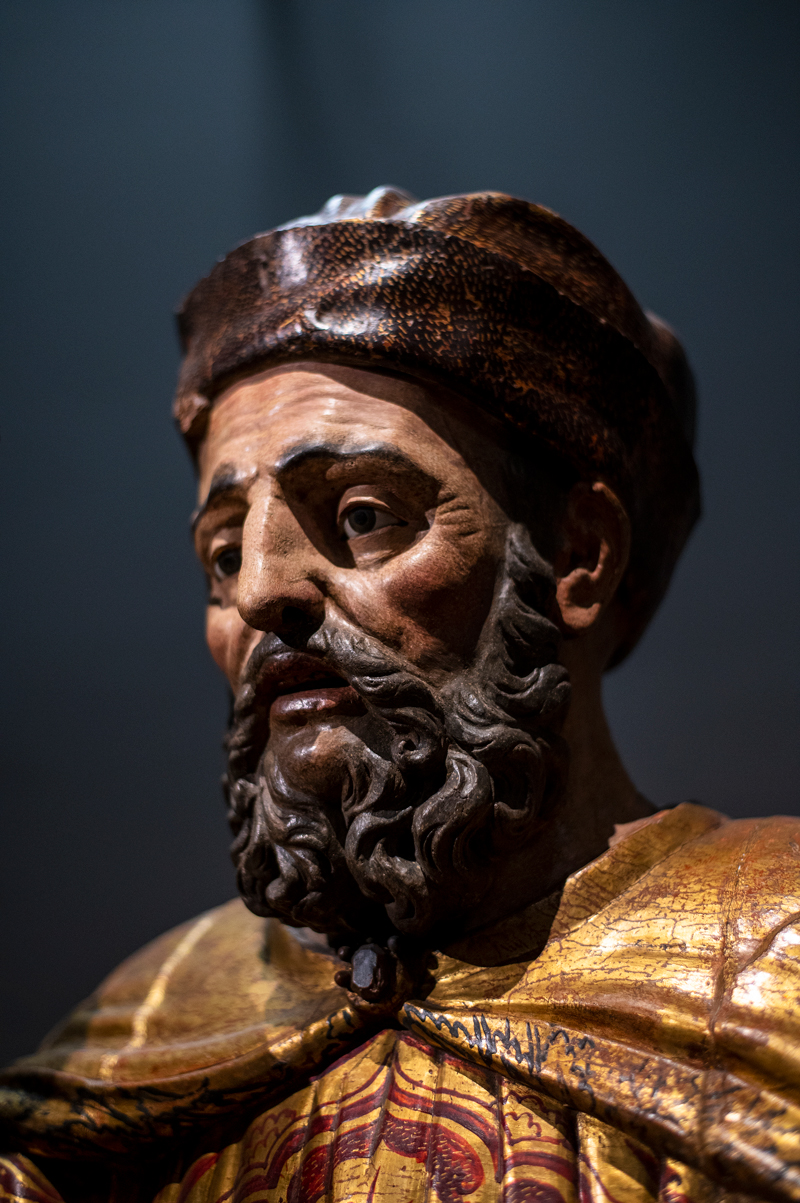
Portrait of Saint Joseph (Nativity Crib), San Domenico Maggiore, by Pietro Belverte and assistants

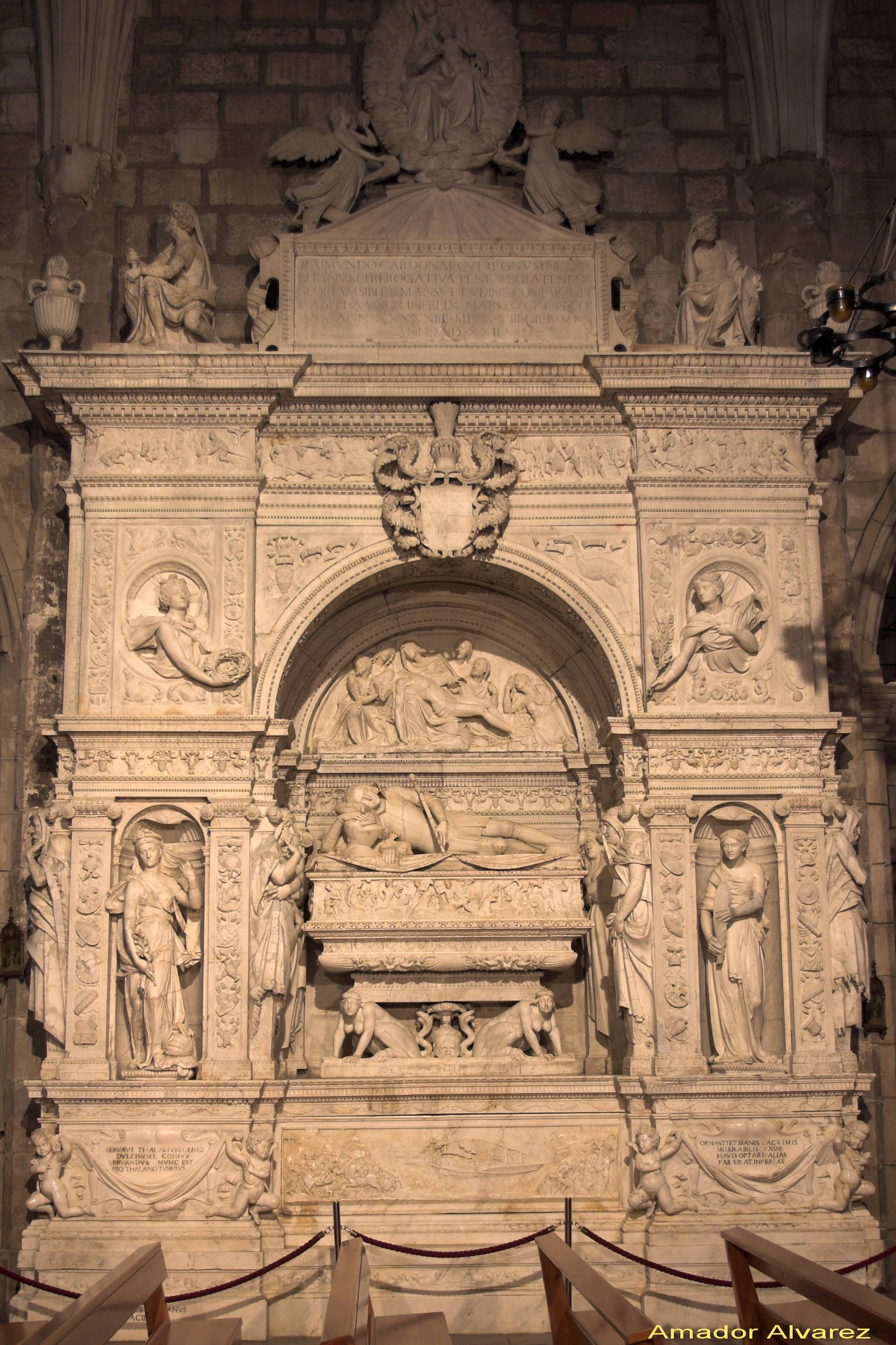
Tomb of Don Ramón de Cardona, Bellpuig (Spain)

Giovanni Merliani of Nola is regarded, much like Giovan Francesco Mormando in architecture at the turn of the fifteenth and sixteenth centuries, as a leading figure in sculpture and, to a lesser extent, architecture in the process of assimilating and maturing artistic stimuli and cultural exchanges with artists trained outside the local tradition. Information concerning his training is scarce. He is mentioned in the letter sent by Pietro Summonte to Marcantonio Michiel, which summarises the state of the arts in Naples during the early 16th century. The letter indicates, through Summonte's direct testimony, that Merliani trained in the workshop of Pietro Belverte, a sculptor and woodcarver of Venetian-Lombard origin who probably arrived in Naples as part of the artistic renewal programme promoted by the Aragonese in the mid-fifteenth century. Training under a master woodcarver such as Belverte provided the Nolano artist with the fundamental skills necessary for the creation of refined marble works while continuing to produce wooden sculptures, such as the Saint Sebastian Martyr in the Basilica and Convent of Saint Anthony in Nocera Inferiore, dated 1514, and the sculptural group of the Nativity Crib commissioned by Jacopo Sannazaro around 1520.

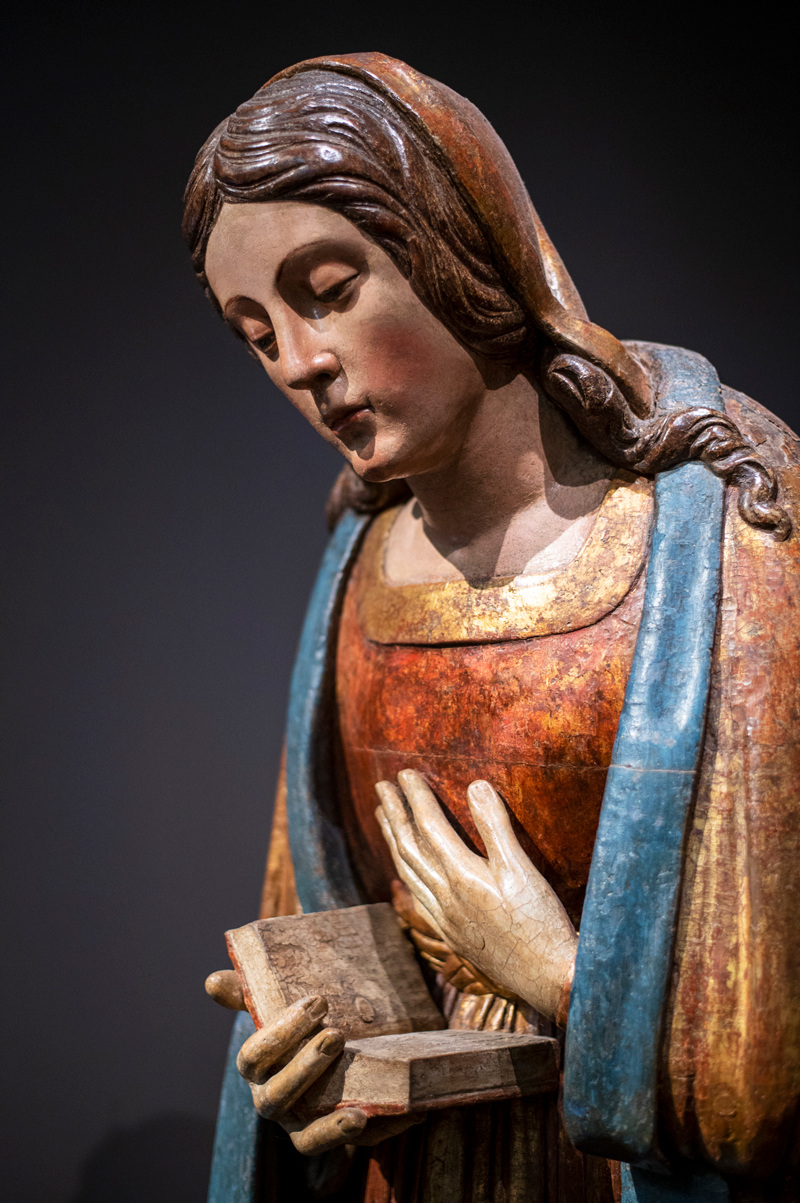
Giovanni da Nola, Annunciate Virgin, 1508–1511, Museo di Capodimonte

The earliest records concerning his activity, both as Belverte's pupil and later as an independent artist, date from 1508. The influence of his master, rooted in the Venetian-Lombard tradition, proved decisive in directing Giovanni da Nola's stylistic orientation toward artistic languages no longer dependent on Florentine models but rather connected to Lombard and Venetian influences. His work as a sculptor in marble began around 1516. The adoption of marble, rather than wood, represented an attempt to broaden his clientele among the city's most prestigious patrons and to compete with foreign artists active in Naples.

The cultural environment of the viceregal capital during the first three decades of the century enabled Merliani to absorb and reinterpret artistic languages beyond his original training. The arrival of artists from Rome encouraged the spread of the Raphaelesque style, which strongly influenced the sculptor from Nola, as well as, to a lesser extent, echoes of the sculpture of Michelangelo. These indirect influences favoured the creation of a synthetic artistic language capable of uniting sixteenth-century classicism, clearly visible in wall tombs and marble altars, with the Lombard-Venetian tradition characterised by delicate ornamental solutions reminiscent of the imaginary architectural settings found in the works of Carlo Crivelli.

Drawing upon figurative models already introduced by Lombard artists such as the aforementioned Jacopo della Pila, who had promoted the use of the arcosolium as an independent sculptural structure enriched with statuary, Giovanni da Nola reinterpreted the model through a more explicitly classical lens, effectively breaking with compositions still rooted in fifteenth-century traditions. As occurred in Michelangelo's work in Rome, particularly the Tomb of Pope Julius II, increasingly elaborate wall monuments began to appear in the principal churches of the vice-capital of the Spanish Empire where Merliani was active.

In later works dating to the third decade of the sixteenth century, such as the Ligorio Altar in Sant'Anna dei Lombardi, significant developments in his figurative language can be observed. The central scene is framed by a small architectural backdrop clearly inspired by the Serliana, while the classical structure is softened by refined vegetal ornamentation, recalling his training alongside Lombard workshops established in Naples. Similar characteristics are visible in the marble reredos of the Chapel of Saint John the Baptist in the same church, sculpted in 1516.

The reredos in Basilica of San Domenico Maggiore displays even more mature qualities. Completed in 1536, the entire composition is enclosed within a temple-like structure recalling the shrines of the Lares. The Doric order is correctly executed, featuring an architrave decorated with metopes and triglyphs and crowned by a triangular pediment. At one-third of the column shafts appears the floral ornamentation characteristic of the sculptor.

The progressive emancipation of altars and wall tombs as independent artistic compositions reached its culmination with the monumental Tomb of Pedro de Toledo. The monument adopts a pyramidal composition and is not placed against the wall of the San Giacomo degli Spagnoli, but rather occupies a central position behind the presbytery. While the tomb shares certain similarities with Michelangelo's original design for the tomb of Pope Julius II, it is more directly influenced by the royal burials of the Royal Chapel of Granada. The monument was not completed on schedule and became a collaborative undertaking involving Annibale Caccavello and Domenico Auria, reaching completion only in 1570 after twenty years of work.

The likely reference to Spanish royal tombs may stem from Merliani's direct familiarity with such monuments. At Bellpuig in Catalonia, he produced, most probably in Naples and subsequently shipped by sea, the Tomb of Don Ramón de Cardona, dated around 1525. This marble monument, an arcosolium transformed into a classical triumphal arch, stands as a completely independent architectural composition, functioning almost as a façade placed against a wall. Together with the tomb of Don Pedro de Toledo, it represents one of the highest achievements of Neapolitan Renaissance sculpture. The Spanish monument shares certain compositional characteristics with the work of Jacopo Sansovino for the Roman tomb of Giovanni Michiel, yet Giovanni da Nola achieved a greater unity of composition through the complete fusion of architectural structure and sculptural ornamentation. This integration links the principal narrative scenes, including the delicate stiacciato of the lunette depicting the Pietà, the funerary portrait of Viceroy Ramón de Cardona surrounded by mourning caryatids, and the two statues representing Peace placed within the small niches of the triumphal arch.

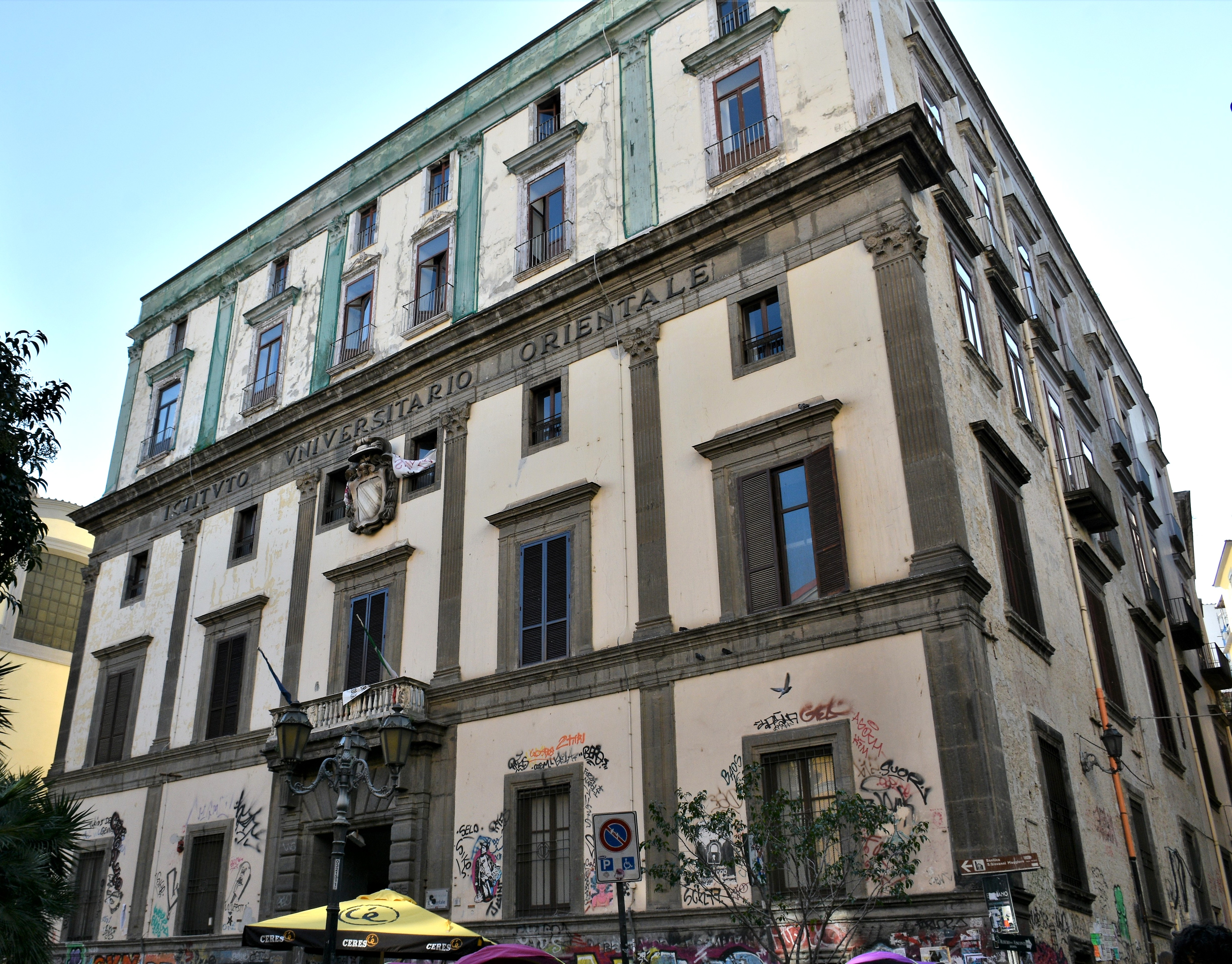
Palazzo Giusso, formerly Palazzo Filomarino della Torre

Another significant work is the high altar of Basilica of San Lorenzo Maggiore, where the altar is no longer conceived merely as a liturgical table but achieves complete compositional independence. Executed in marble, it consists of three niches containing statues of saints, including the patron saint of the basilica. As in the Bellpuig tomb, architecture and sculpture interact seamlessly. This small retablo reflects artistic models introduced by Iberian culture present in the viceregal capital.

These examples of sculpture, which integrate architectural design and the organisation of the surrounding space, illustrate a development common to many Renaissance artists: the gradual transition toward the design of buildings themselves. The limited documentary evidence, largely due to the destruction of important archival records during the Second World War, prevents a full assessment of the contributions made by many artists and architects active between the second half of the fifteenth century and the early decades of the sixteenth century.

The only buildings securely attributed to Giovanni da Nola as architect are the Palazzo di Sangro, extensively remodelled during the seventeenth and eighteenth centuries by Raimondo di Sangro, and Palazzo Giusso, now the seat of the University of Naples "L'Orientale". The latter preserves significant elements of its original sixteenth-century structure along its façades. The principal façade follows the traditional arrangement of the sixteenth-century palace as codified by Mormando: a piperno base supports a mezzanine level articulated by a first architectural order, above which a stringcourse marks the transition to a giant order of Composite pilasters encompassing the piano nobile and an upper level originally intended for servants.

=== Andrea Sabatini and Marco Cardisco ===
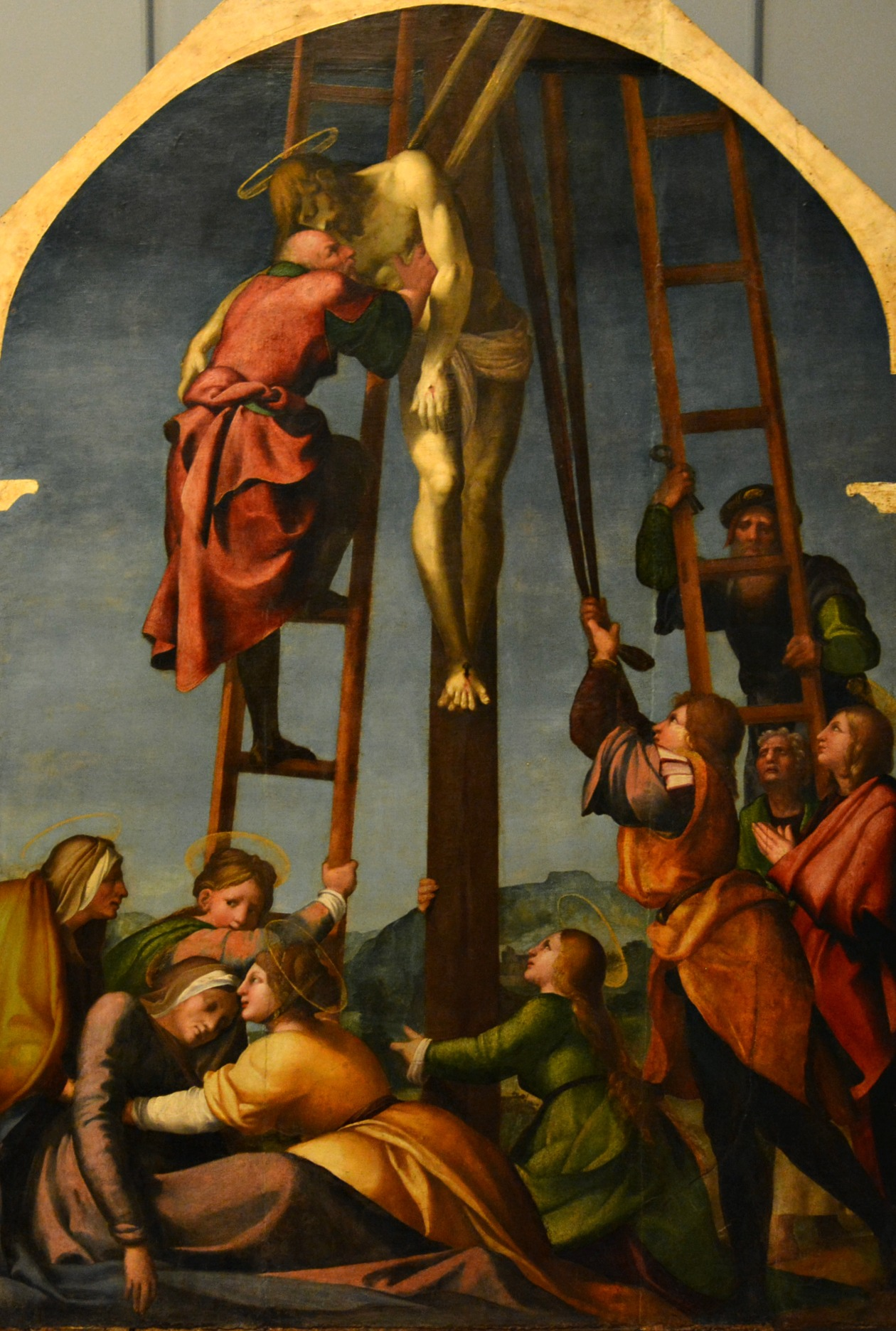
Andrea Sabatini, Deposition from the Cross, 1520, Museo di Capodimonte, Naples

Andrea Sabatini is regarded as the leading painter of the Kingdom of Naples during the early sixteenth century and the artist chiefly responsible for renewing southern Italian painting along modern and Raphaelesque lines. In the triptych painted in 1508 for the church of Teggiano, no Raphaelesque influences are yet apparent; instead, the work reflects more archaic echoes rooted in the Umbrian tradition of Perugino. In the years following the Teggiano work, Sabatini came into contact with the artistic language of Cesare da Sesto, who was staying in Naples at the time to produce, in 1515, the polyptych destined for the La Trinità della Cava de' Tirreni. The influence of the Lombard painter, who had been trained within Raphael's circle, constituted Sabatini's first encounter with the maniera moderna.

In the course of his stylistic development, Sabatini undertook several journeys, probably including a visit to Florence in order to study first-hand the achievements of post-Medicean contemporary painting. Between 1514 and 1516 he painted two panels for the Monte Cassino Abbey, whose artistic language reveals the influence of Ridolfo Ghirlandaio. A further journey, this time to Rome, probably enabled him to achieve full mastery of the artistic language of Raphael. This visit certainly took place before 1519, the year in which he painted a triptych for the Church of San Francesco in Nocera Inferiore, where fully developed Raphaelesque influences appear for the first time.

Sabatini's influence on the painting produced during the first four decades of the sixteenth century was significant in shaping a number of local painters who would play important roles in the development of Mannerist culture during the mid-sixteenth century. Among them was Giovanni Filippo Criscuolo, who also trained under Perino del Vaga in Rome. Works displaying complete adherence to the Raphaelesque style of the Raphael Rooms are preserved in the Museo di Capodimonte. Another painter educated in Raphael's artistic language through Sabatini was his brother-in-law Severo Ierace, whose works are largely preserved in Salerno, particularly in the Provincial Art Gallery of Salerno.

A separate discussion is warranted for Marco Cardisco, whose artistic training took place in Calabria, his native region. Owing to chronological considerations, however, he is generally associated with Andrea Sabatini, his contemporary, whose influence he absorbed. The Calabrian painter, the only artist from southern Italy considered worthy of inclusion in the biographies of Giorgio Vasari, was the painter most deeply influenced by the artistic culture of Polidoro da Caravaggio. The impact of Polidoro's style can already be discerned in Cardisco's Adoration of the Magi of 1519.

=== 1490s-1530s: the shift in artistic reference from Florence to Rome ===
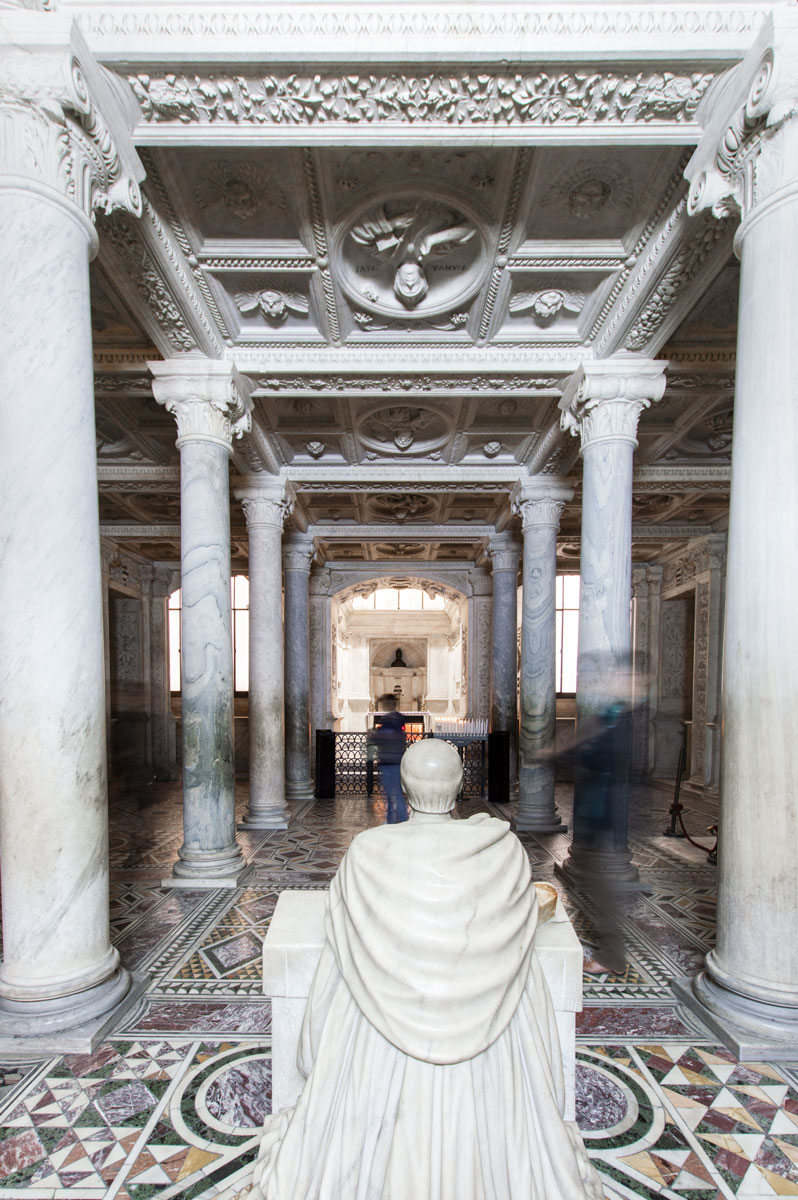
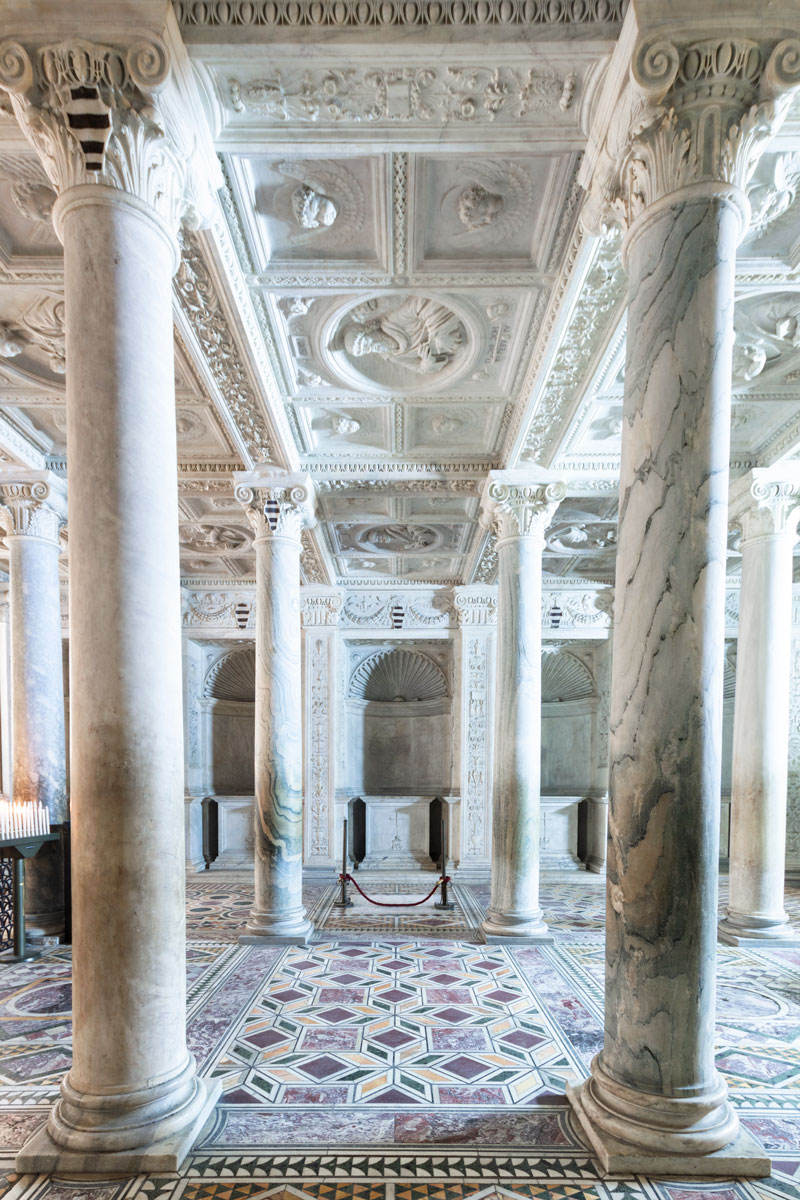
Interior of the Succorpo Chapel in Naples Cathedral

After the death of Lorenzo de' Medici, Florence gradually lost its ability to remain the principal artistic and literary centre of the Italian peninsula. The temporary disappearance of the Medici from the international political stage caused uncertainty among allied courts, including the Aragonese court of Naples. At the same time, the prestige of the Medici family continued to grow, leading to the rise within the cardinalatial circles of Rome of Giovanni di Lorenzo de' Medici, son of Lorenzo the Magnificent, and Giulio Zanobi di Giuliano de' Medici, son of Giuliano de' Medici. Both eventually ascended to the papal throne as Pope Leo X and Pope Clement VII respectively. Educated in an environment that valued beauty and patronage, these two pontiffs played a central role in accelerating the transformation of Rome into the leading artistic centre of sixteenth-century Italy. This transfer of cultural leadership was accompanied, from the closing years of the fifteenth century onward, by the movement of Florentine and other artists and architects to the papal city.

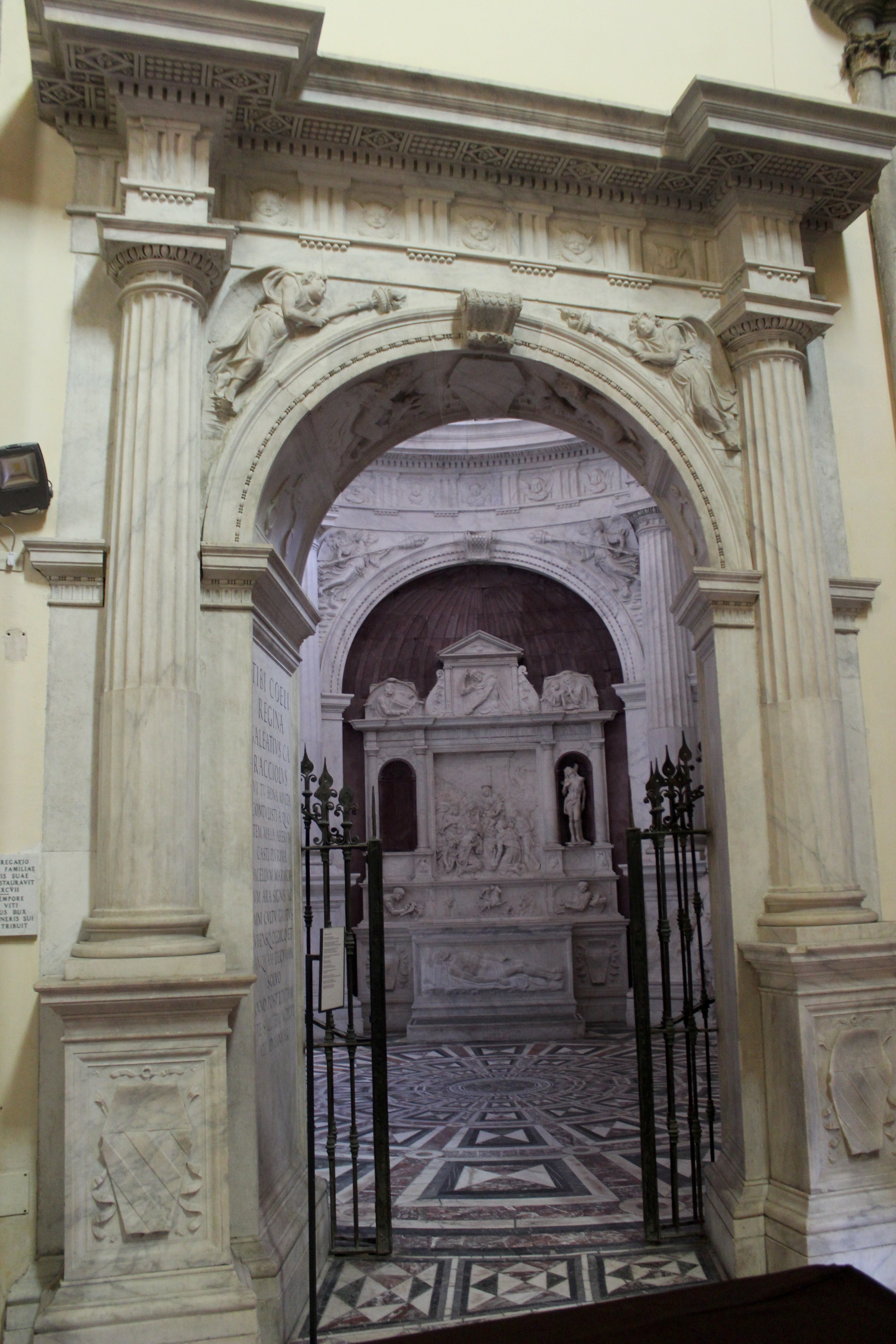
Entrance to the Caracciolo di Vico Chapel, San Giovanni a Carbonara

This change was also felt at the Aragonese court. One of the first to recognise it was Cardinal Oliviero Carafa, one of the most important patrons of the late fifteenth century. His position as a high-ranking prelate enabled him to act as a bridge between Rome and Naples. Among the commissions associated with his patronage in the papal city was the new cloister of Santa Maria della Pace, entrusted to Bramante, who had recently moved from Milan to Rome in the service of Pope Alexander VI.

Bramante's role in the architectural history of the Kingdom of Naples has long been debated by scholars. It has been established that the architect from Urbino undertook several journeys of varying duration throughout the peninsula before permanently settling in Rome. The Succorpo Chapel within the Gothic Naples Cathedral therefore represents the first step away from a strictly Florentine architectural language toward a Lombard-Roman stylistic direction. The attribution of the work, whether direct or indirect, to Bramante was proposed on several occasions by Roberto Pane and later supported by Arnaldo Bruschi.

Construction of the chapel began in 1497, the year in which the relics of Saint Januarius were returned to Naples, and the work was entrusted to the city's most prolific workshop at the turn of the century, that of Tommaso and Giovan Tommaso Malvito. Construction continued until 1508. The complexity of the project required the creation of a space beneath the cathedral apse, achieved by raising the apse floor by only eighty centimetres while excavating nearly three metres below the foundations.

The resulting space was relatively confined and, in order to improve lighting, windows were opened in the intervals between the apse buttresses. The chapel ceiling is supported by flattened vaults resting on marble columns that divide the interior into three small aisles for structural reasons. The vaulting system is concealed by a marble ceiling supported by a sophisticated arrangement of inverted beams with bearing slots on both sides. The limited height of the space, together with the resulting departures from the conventional application of the architectural orders, such as the use of garlands between pilasters instead of a continuous entablature frieze, strongly suggests the presence of an overseeing designer capable of providing precise overall instructions for execution.

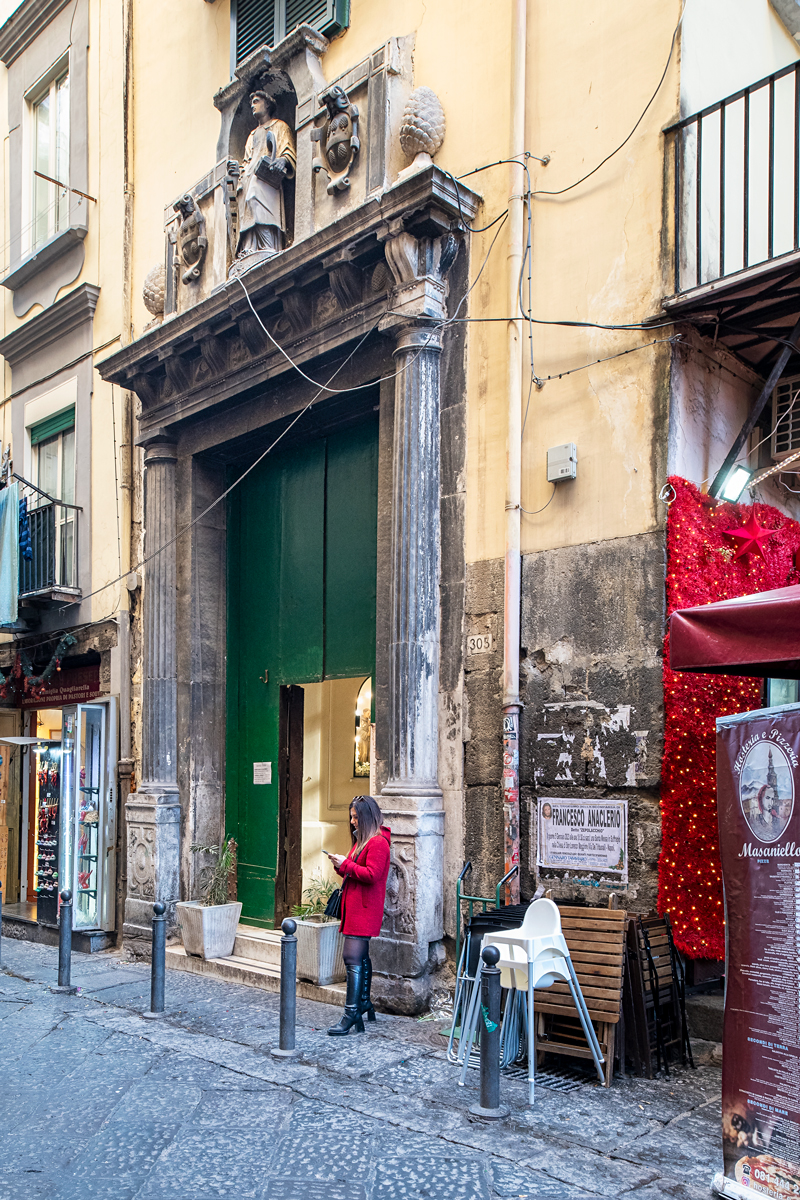
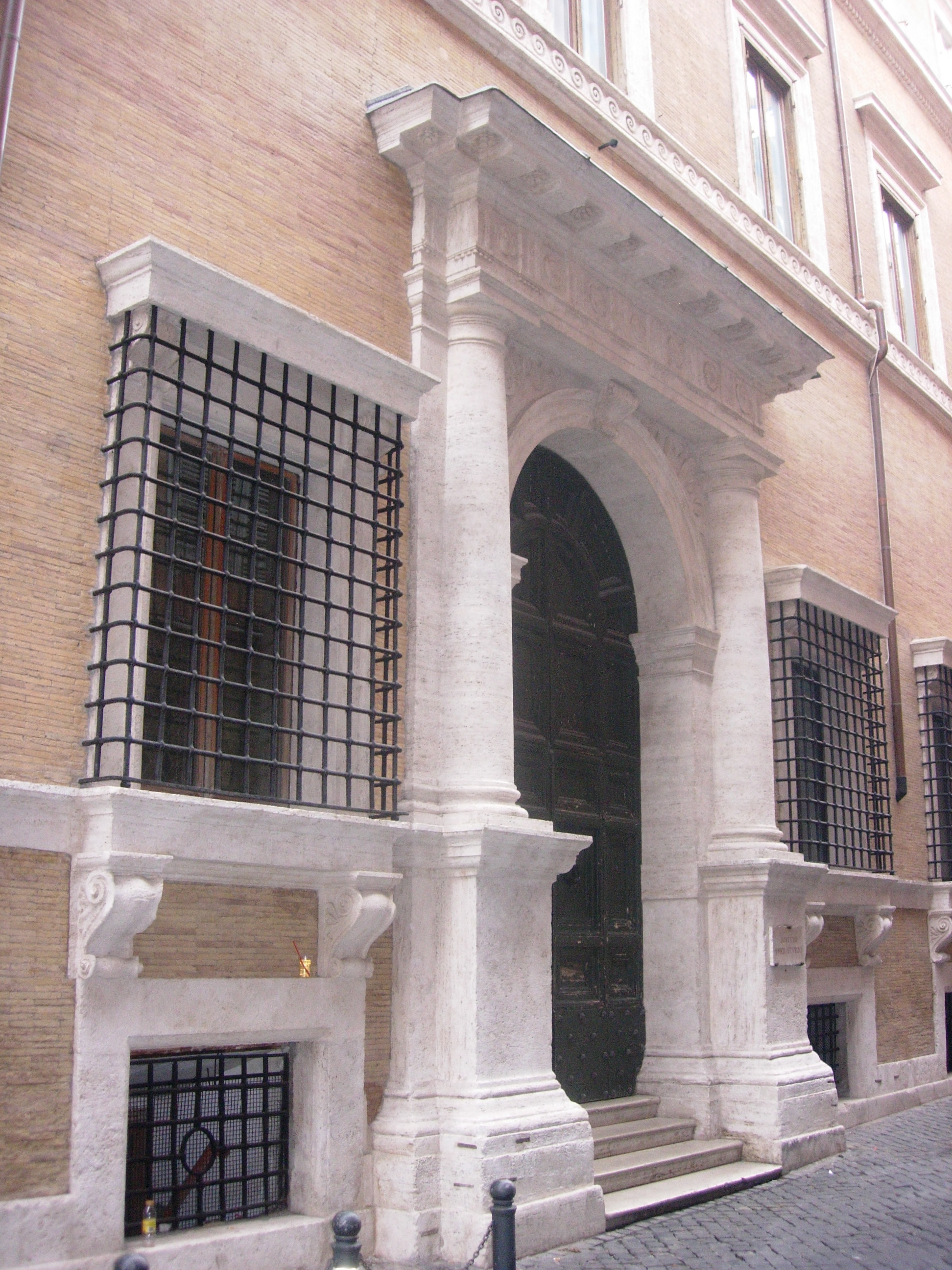
Portal of Palazzo Pignone in Naples (left), compared with that of Palazzo Baldassini in Rome (right)
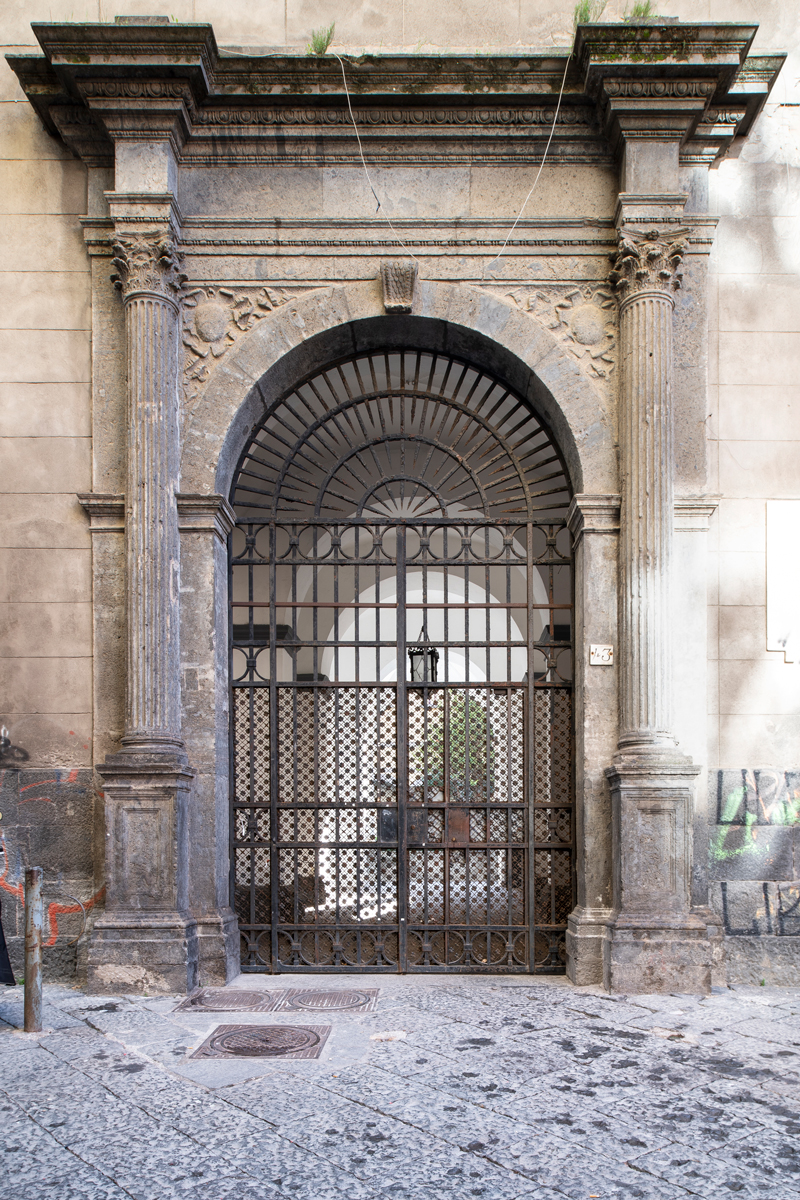
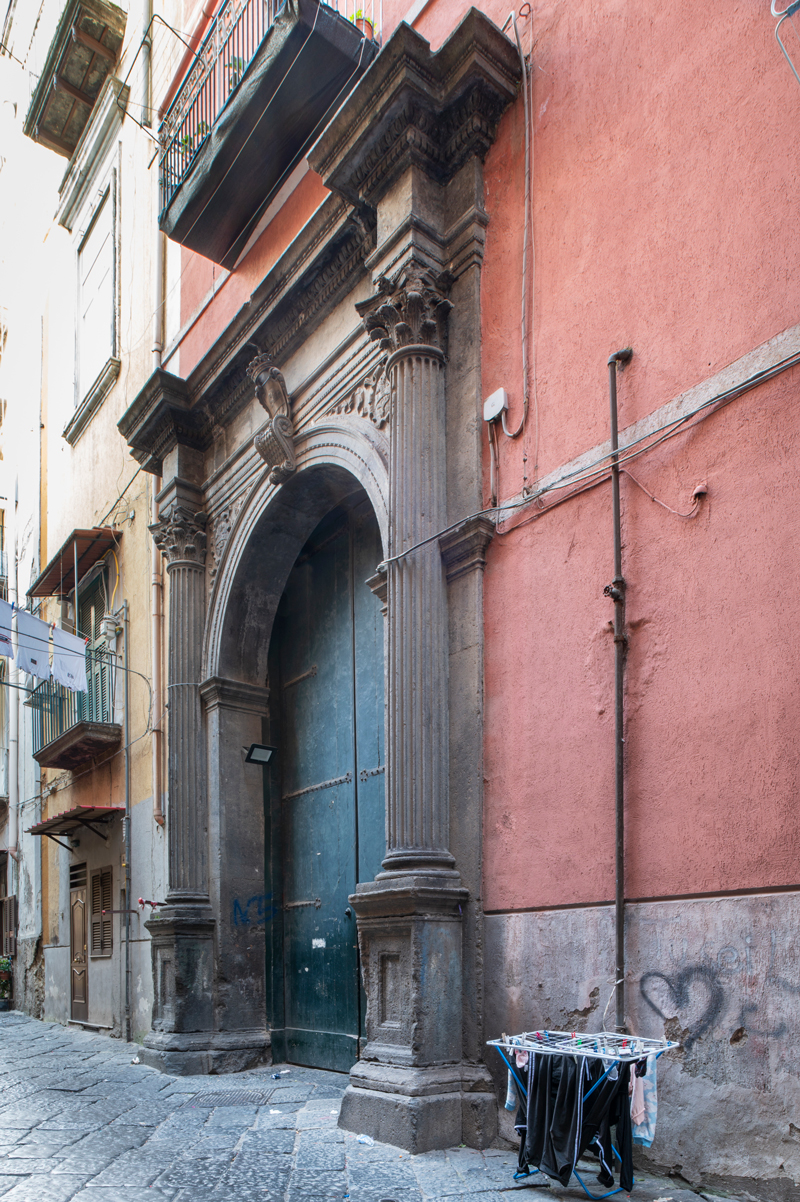
Portal marking the secondary entrance to the Santa Maria la Nova complex (left) and the portal of Palazzo De Liguoro (right)

The influence of Bramante, or of architects close to him, can also be detected in the Caracciolo di Vico Chapel in San Giovanni a Carbonara. The chapel is conceived as a perfect circle crowned by a coffered hemispherical dome that, on a smaller scale, recalls that of the Pantheon. Unlike the Succorpo Chapel, where Lombard influences remain evident, the chapel in San Giovanni a Carbonara reflects the mature classicism of the second decade of the century. The architectural structure was already completed by 1516. According to Roberto Pane, the design should be attributed to Giovan Tommaso Malvito, whose name appears in archival documents examined by Richard Filangieri.

These works, emblematic of the transition toward classicism, were accompanied by numerous smaller architectural projects throughout the city. Most of them have been lost as a result of later Baroque transformations and demolitions associated with the nineteenth-century urban renewal. In general, unlike the previous century, the sixteenth century saw sacred architecture become the dominant field of activity. Following the first effects of the Reformation initiated by Martin Luther, the Church attempted an internal renewal that culminated in the Counter-Reformation during the middle of the century.

The period of classical Renaissance architecture lasted approximately three decades, similarly to developments in other Italian courts, with some lingering examples surviving until the mid-1540s. It was gradually supplanted by the maniera moderna, which in Naples and throughout the kingdom maintained certain elements of continuity with classicism while differing from it through the progressive simplification of the archetypal models of the early sixteenth century.

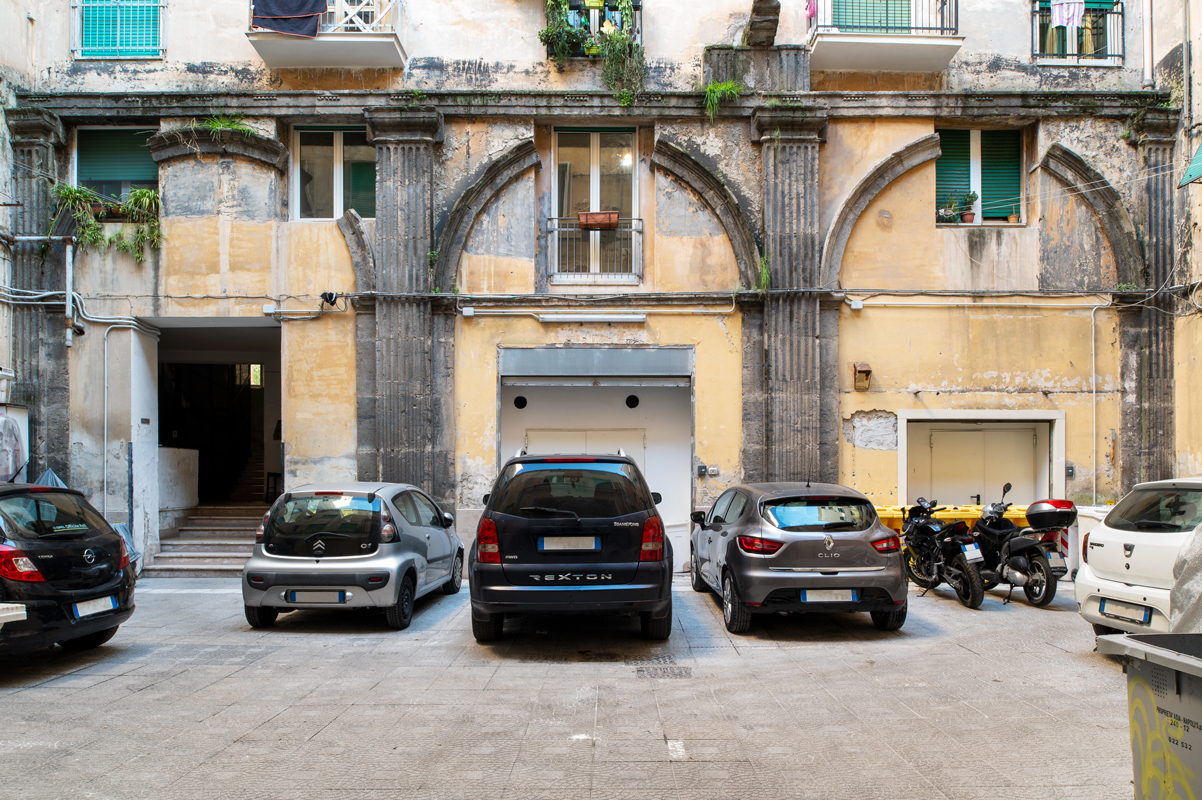
Surviving sixteenth-century arcades of Palazzo De Scorciatis, heavily altered by reconstruction

In the field of civil architecture, this transition was marked by the construction of Palazzo De Scorciatis, commissioned by Julio de Scorciatis. The palace, now severely altered by wartime bombing and insensitive post-war reconstruction, still preserves architectural elements of considerable importance, including a sequence of Doric arcades dating from the mature phase of sixteenth-century architectural language. The identity of the architect responsible for the arcades, and therefore the building itself, remains unknown from surviving archival documentation. However, the designer was clearly familiar with the architectural vocabulary of Baldassare Peruzzi and Giuliano da Sangallo.

No examples of mature classical civil architecture survive intact in Naples. They can now be appreciated only through fragmentary architectural elements such as portals and moulded window surrounds. Among the surviving portals are that of Palazzo Miroballo, now serving as the secondary entrance to the Basilica of Saint Peter ad Aram, carved in piperno and stylistically related to the sculptural language of the Malvito workshop, and the portal of the former Palazzo Pignone, whose overall composition recalls the portal of Palazzo Baldassini in Rome, designed by Antonio da Sangallo the Younger.

The Neapolitan portal, currently marking the secondary entrance to the Basilica of San Lorenzo Maggiore, employs a simplified and less sophisticated version of the Roman model. Two further portals designed in the form of triumphal arches are those of Palazzo De Liguoro on Via Costa and Palazzo Caravita, now relocated to the entrance of Villa Leonetti on Via Aniello Falcone. The former, conceived according to distinctly Roman principles, employs the Corinthian order and displays a more mature composition than the portal of Palazzo Pignone. The latter, executed in the Doric order, departs from the austerity of Roman classicism by combining it with the late Lombard decorative language characterised by the proliferation of phytomorphic motifs across the piperno surfaces.

A third portal, similar to that of Palazzo De Liguoro, is located on Via Santa Maria la Nova. It originally belonged to the palace of the Medici of Ottajano and stood near its present location before being relocated as the secondary entrance to the former monastic complex of Santa Maria la Nova following the demolition of the historic Carità district. Both portals reinterpret the Roman triumphal arch with a single opening. This feature, relatively uncommon in Naples, where flat portals of late Florentine and Lombard inspiration remained preferred, suggests the presence in the early sixteenth century of highly cultivated architectural personalities whose contributions remain insufficiently studied because of the scarcity of surviving evidence.

The principal differences between the portal of Palazzo De Liguoro and that of Santa Maria la Nova concern the ornamental treatment of the piperno surfaces. The De Liguoro portal features a much richer decorative programme that would suggest a date in the earliest years of the sixteenth century. Its arch displays banded ornamentation comparable in quality to that of the entrance arch of the Cappella del Doce in San Domenico Maggiore. By contrast, the Medici of Ottajano portal exhibits a more restrained and simplified design, suggesting a later execution, perhaps inspired by other similar portals in the city. Pane hypothesised that it was produced around the middle of the century.

Also noteworthy is the construction and completion of Palazzo Filomarino and Palazzo del Panormita. In both buildings, the name of Giovanni Francesco Di Palma is documented. He continued the Mormandean architectural language until the third quarter of the sixteenth century, and his work is more appropriately discussed within the context of Mannerist architecture in Naples.

=== Sacred architecture during the first decades of the 16th century ===
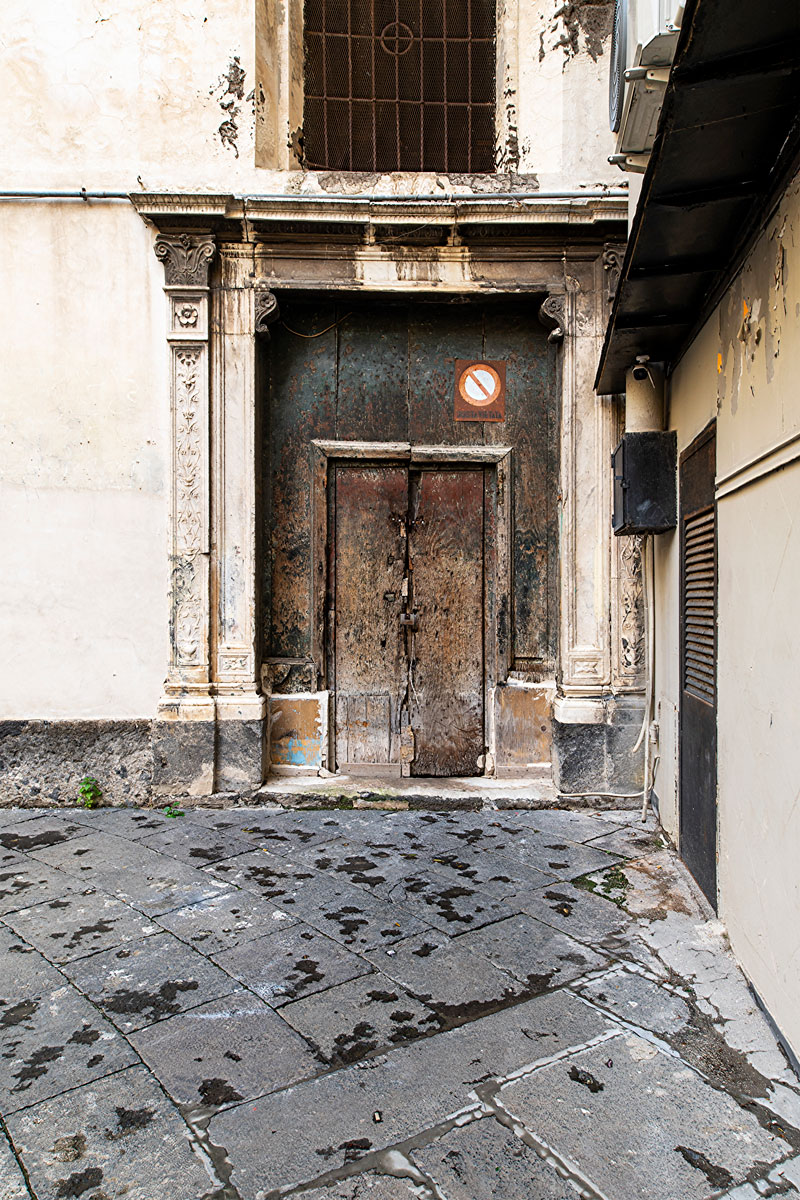
Malvito-style portal of the small Santa Maria dell'Arco a Portanova church

Among sacred buildings, some of the most significant works of this period deserve particular attention. Unlike the preceding century, the sixteenth century marked the triumph of the Catholic Church, both before the Protestant Reformation and after the Council of Trent. Strictly Renaissance works belong to a relatively limited time span. Whereas fifteenth-century examples were few and largely confined to rebuilding campaigns following the earthquake of 1456, this period witnessed the development of new theories regarding the planimetric and volumetric organisation of sacred space. The Latin cross plan remained the principal model for the new, albeit sporadic, church constructions of the early sixteenth century. Since the late fifteenth century, there had also been a preference for creating small auxiliary spaces attached to major basilicas in the form of private family chapels. These structures constituted independent examples of small central-plan architecture and served as prototypes for architectural solutions that would later become fundamental to Baroque architecture.

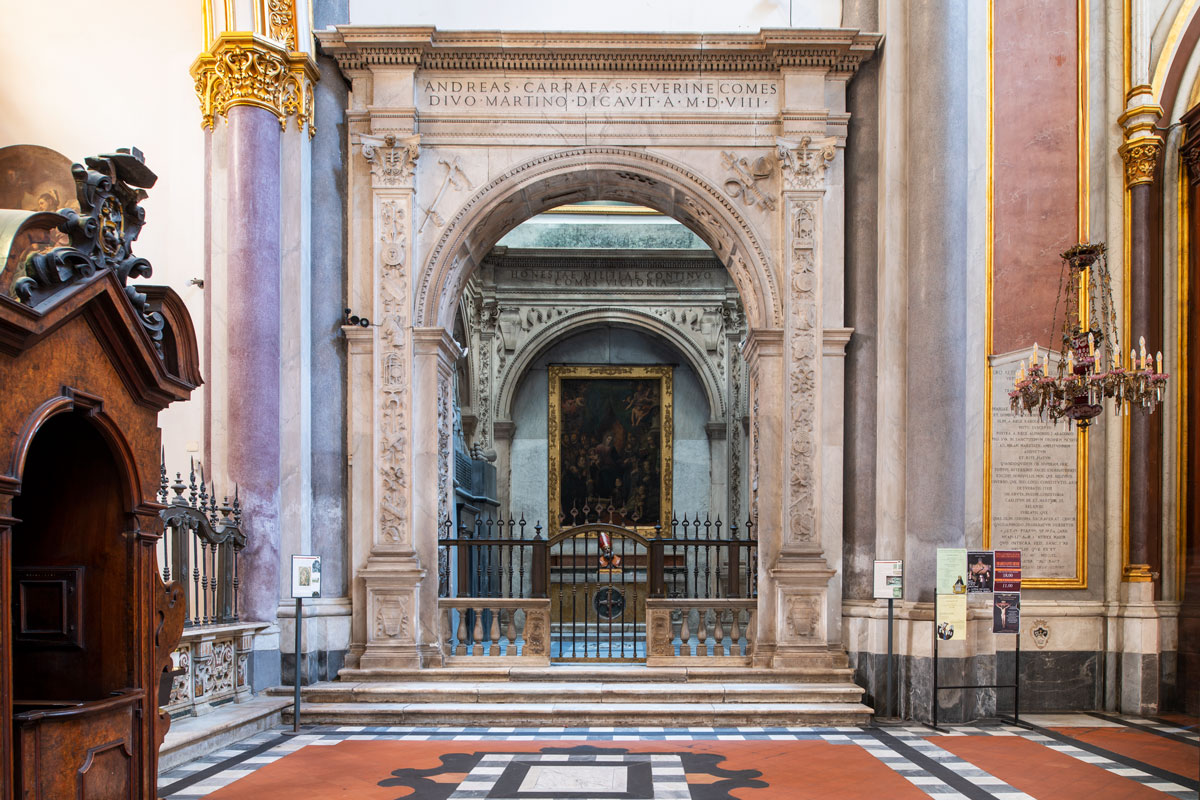
Chapel of Saint Martin in San Domenico Maggiore

As in civil architecture, few elements survive to convey the magnificence achieved by sacred buildings during this period, much of which was concealed by later Baroque renovations. An example is the Church of San Pietro Martire, whose Renaissance appearance was entirely hidden behind the stucco decoration executed by Giuseppe Astarita in the second half of the eighteenth century. Only after wartime damage during the Second World War did two sixteenth-century arches framed by Corinthian pilasters on high pedestals re-emerge, displaying a fully Mormandean character.

Once again, portals provide some of the most important evidence for this historical phase, which received relatively little scholarly attention in subsequent centuries. The workshop of Tommaso Malvito and Giovan Tommaso Malvito fully embodied the stylistic transition between the fifteenth and sixteenth centuries. Although the Sant'Agrippino a Forcella church had already undergone restoration beginning in 1476, Roberto Pane identified stylistic similarities, despite the incomplete exterior of the building, with the church of Santa Maria delle Nevi by Francesco di Giorgio Martini.

It was within this context that the prolific production of the Malvito workshop developed, drawing upon the decorative language of Lombard origin introduced by the sculptors active at the Aragonese court. Dating from the sixteenth century is the portal with candelabrum pilasters of the small Santa Maria dell'Arco a Portanova church. On stylistic grounds, it was probably executed during the opening years of the century. Alongside the emergence of an austere and classical language of Roman derivation, the first decades of the century were also characterised by decorative forms inspired by central Italian and Lombard traditions.

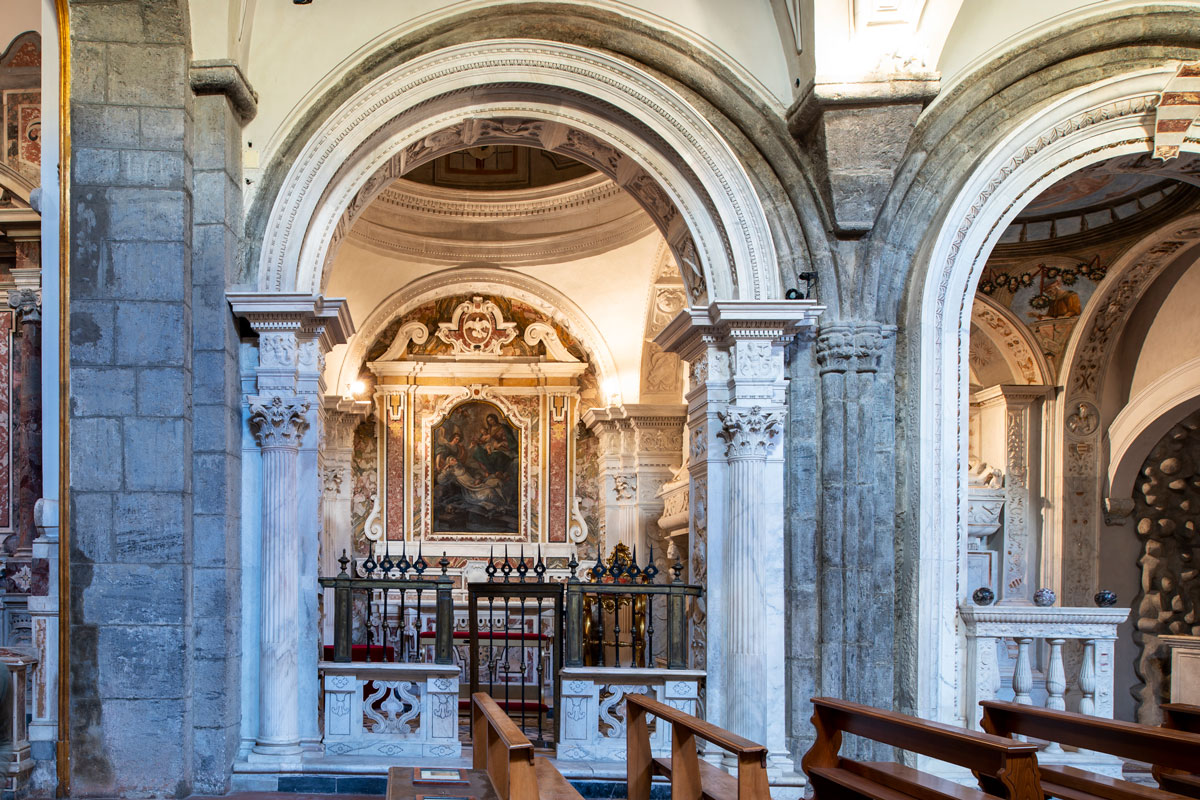
Doce Chapel in San Domenico Maggiore

The San Domenico Maggiore basilica best represents the architectural and sculptural production of the period spanning the turn of the century. The Dominican church became the burial place of one of the most prestigious families of the Kingdom of Naples, the Carafa. Members of the family occupied the highest social and ecclesiastical positions of the age and, in order to emphasise both their prestige and their commitment to patronage, transformed the side chapels into elaborate settings that combined Renaissance architecture and sculpture until the mid-1530s.

Subsequent Baroque alterations and the nineteenth-century restorations undertaken by Federico Travaglini have altered both the readability and artistic quality of the original spaces, which were probably reconstructed in Renaissance forms after the earthquake of 1456. One of the most coherently preserved spaces is the Cappellone del Crocifisso. It consists of a single-nave chamber with two chapels along the left side. The walls of the principal space are lined with funerary monuments belonging to the Carafa family. Together, these tombs form one of the most remarkable anthologies of Neapolitan sculpture from the late fifteenth to the late sixteenth century.

Within the chapel complex, the two smaller chapels known as the Doce Chapel and the Nativity Chapel are of particular interest. Both represent some of the highest achievements of the Renaissance in Naples. The former takes the form of a small central-plan space entered through a remarkable Corinthian arch contemporary with developments occurring in Rome. Its sculptural and architectural decoration was entrusted to Girolamo Santacroce with the assistance of Giacomo da Brescia and Antonino de Marco. The adjacent Nativity Chapel was entrusted to the Malvito workshop and dates from shortly after the completion of the Succorpo Chapel in the cathedral.

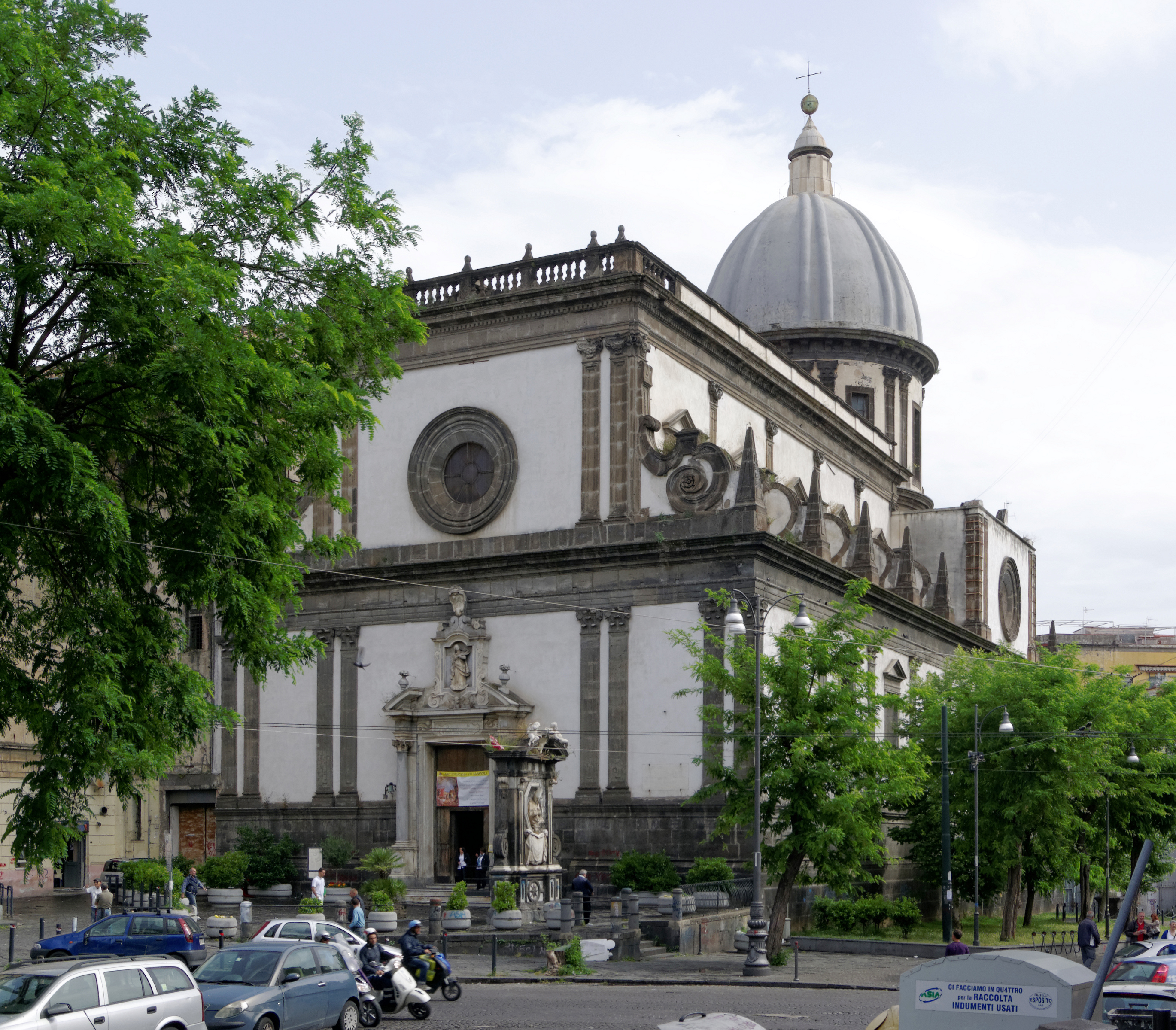
Santa Caterina a Formiello

The other major Renaissance chapel of the first three decades of the century is the Chapel of Saint Martin, also located in San Domenico Maggiore. It was commissioned by Andrea Carafa of Santa Severina. In his famous letter to Marcantonio Michiel, Summonte attributed the work to Andrea da Fiesole and a certain Matteo Lombardo, but later archival research conducted by Riccardo Filangieri established the authorship of Andrea da Fiesole and his pupil Romolo Balsimelli.

The façade consists of an elegant arch framed by two Corinthian pilasters on pedestals. In this work, dated 1508 by the inscription on the frieze, the influence of the Malvito school is evident in the decorative treatment of the architectural elements. The chapel interior probably resembled the Tolosa Chapel in Monteoliveto, but subsequent modifications altered its spatial coherence and compromised its original appearance.

The figure of Balsimelli, still insufficiently studied by specialised scholarship, also appears in the construction history of the Santa Caterina a Formiello church. Documentary evidence survives in the form of a contract signed in 1519 for the supply of piperno stone intended for the enlargement of the church.

The church, designed as a Latin cross inscribed within a rectangle, preserves its classical proportions despite later Baroque repainting and gilded decoration. The rectangular façade also retains its original proportions despite its completion during the following century. According to Pane, the connecting volutes linking the lower and upper orders recall the unfinished façade of the Basilica of Santo Spirito.

The lower register and the flank facing Porta Capuana are built upon a high stylobate supporting a Composite order alternating with tabernacle windows surmounted by triangular pediments. These features derive clearly from the architectural vocabulary of Francesco di Giorgio Martini and are repeated on the upper level. One hypothesis proposes that Francesco di Giorgio, during his visits to Naples, supplied drawings of architectural elements and perhaps even the plan for a church, since the Neapolitan building displays notable similarities with the Santa Maria delle Grazie al Calcinaio church in Cortona.

The presence of tabernacle windows during the first half of the sixteenth century is relatively uncommon. The Cappellone di San Giacomo della Marca in Santa Maria La Nova, dated 1508 and attributed to the obscure Epifanio Raimo, provides one example. A third tabernacle window surviving in Naples is that of the Chapel of the Wool Guild in Santa Maria delle Grazie Maggiore a Caponapoli, likewise dating from the same period.

The Church of Santa Maria delle Grazie a Caponapoli is the other major and best-preserved church of the Neapolitan early sixteenth century. Constructed over a relatively long period, from 1516 to 1560, the church has a Latin-cross plan with a single nave and a timber roof. It preserves one of the finest examples of the decorative architectural language of the century. The treatment of its surfaces remains rooted in Lombard traditions, drawing upon the most accomplished repertory of the Malvito school while already anticipating certain Mannerist tendencies.

=== Peripheral centres of the Kingdom: Classical architecture and Catalan echoes ===
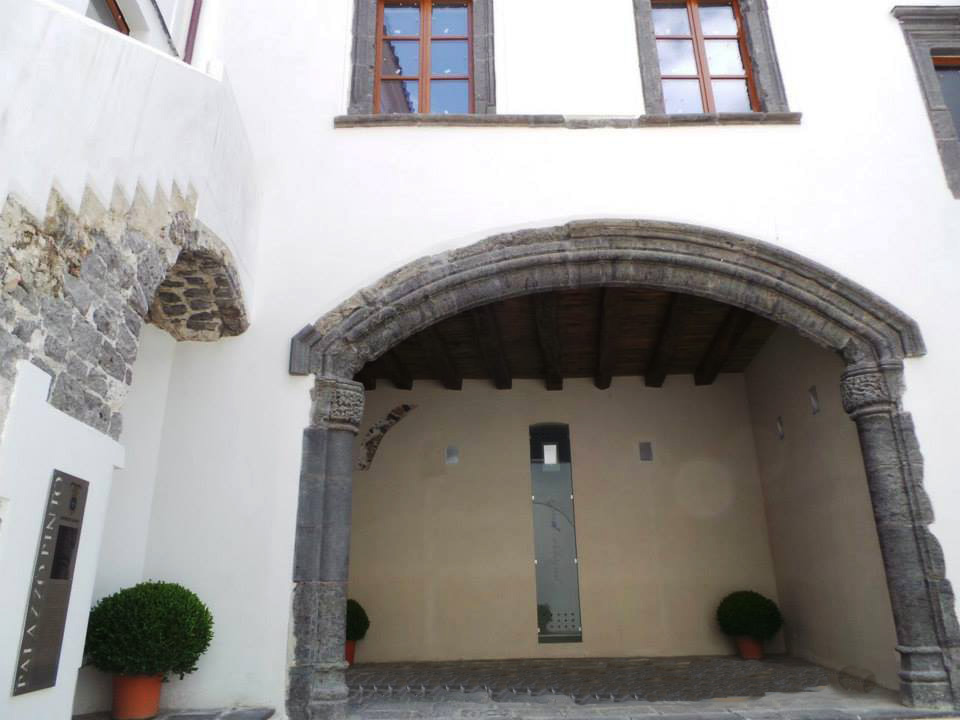
Palazzo Pinto, Salerno. Depressed Catalan arch in the courtyard

In the provinces of the kingdom, architectural development oscillated between the classical impulses connected to the cultural events taking place in Naples and the lingering influence of Catalan culture, which remained deeply rooted in the feudal territories. This gradual development was linked to the progressive relocation of the nobility, who, from the final decade of the fifteenth century onwards, increasingly settled in the capital of the kingdom. Alongside them moved intellectuals, artists and humanists, leaving their feudal estates as temporary residences rather than establishing stable courts capable of fostering cultural and artistic progress in peripheral areas, which consequently remained several decades behind the capital.

The Principato Citra, dominated by the Sanseverino family, experienced significant patronage after the family became Princes of Salerno in 1463. Key figures of the dynasty included Antonello Sanseverino, leader of the Conspiracy of the Barons and later an exile in France, where he encouraged Charles VIII of France to reconquer the Kingdom of Naples, and his grandson Ferdinando Sanseverino, who firmly opposed the introduction of the Spanish Inquisition in the mid-sixteenth century and was subsequently deprived of his wealth and possessions by the viceregal government. Within their territories there was a deliberate political effort to organise the region according to the model of an absolute lordship.

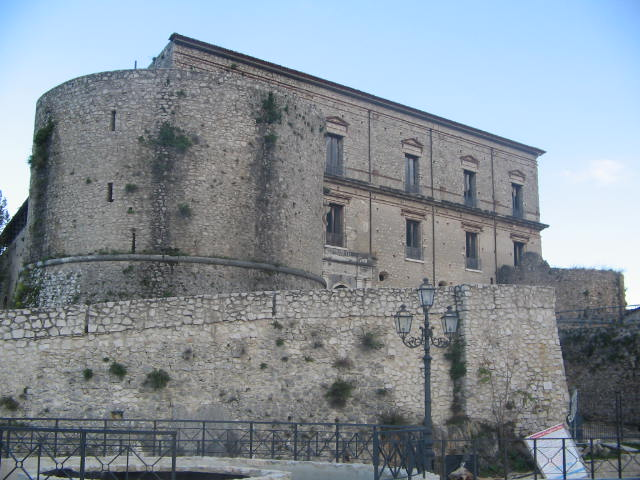
The castle of the Sanseverino princes in Teggiano.

As part of their programme of architectural and artistic renewal, strengthened by Antonello's marriage to Costanza da Montefeltro, the Sanseverino aligned the artistic language of their principality with central Italian models, while integrating Angevin and Catalan survivals. Within this cultural climate stands Palazzo Pinto in Salerno, where strongly Catalan elements remained visible in the original nucleus of the building at the beginning of the sixteenth century.

Sanseverino patronage was concentrated primarily in the upper part of the principality, where the family maintained its seat, particularly in Mercato San Severino, Fisciano and Salerno, locations characterised by aristocratic residences. In contrast, the feudal territories of the Cilento area retained architectural forms tied to archaic derivations of International Gothic and Catalan traditions. More innovative developments appeared in military architecture, especially in castles influenced by ideas associated with Francesco di Giorgio Martini and Giuliano da Sangallo, transmitted through central Italian military engineers who had become permanently established in the kingdom, such as Antonio Fiorentino della Cava.

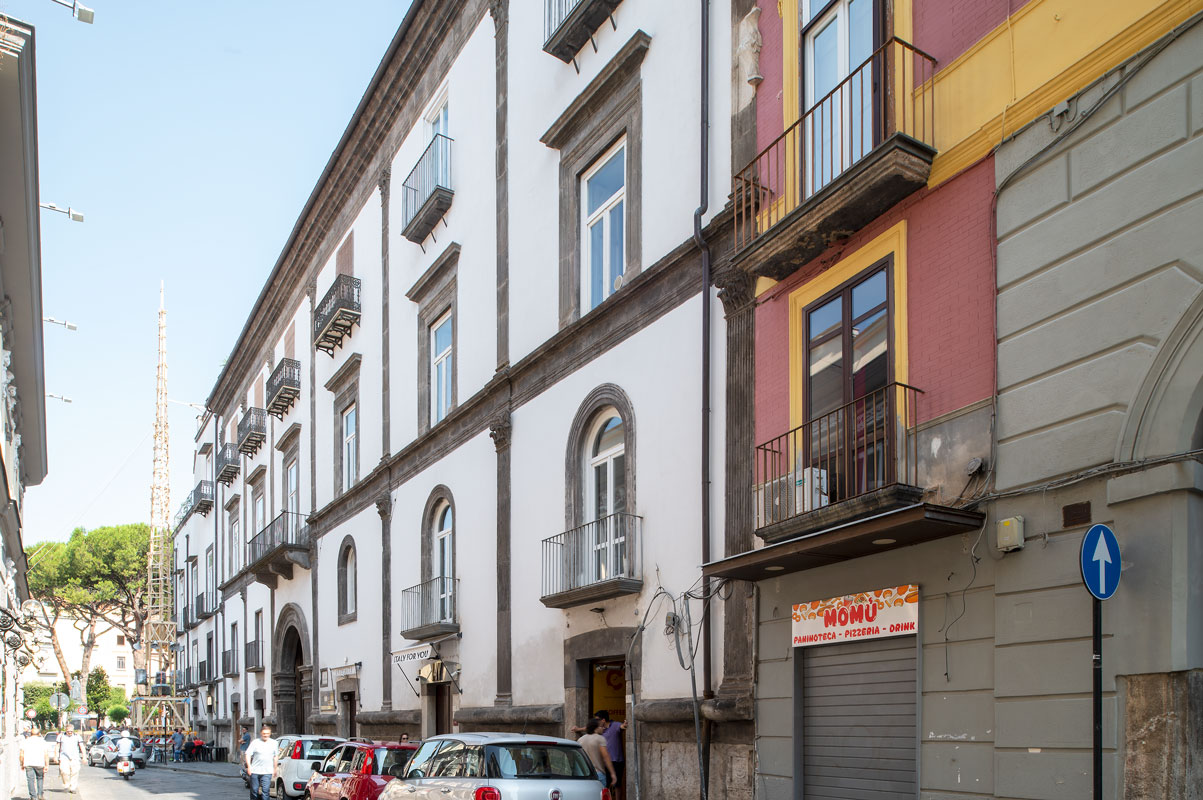
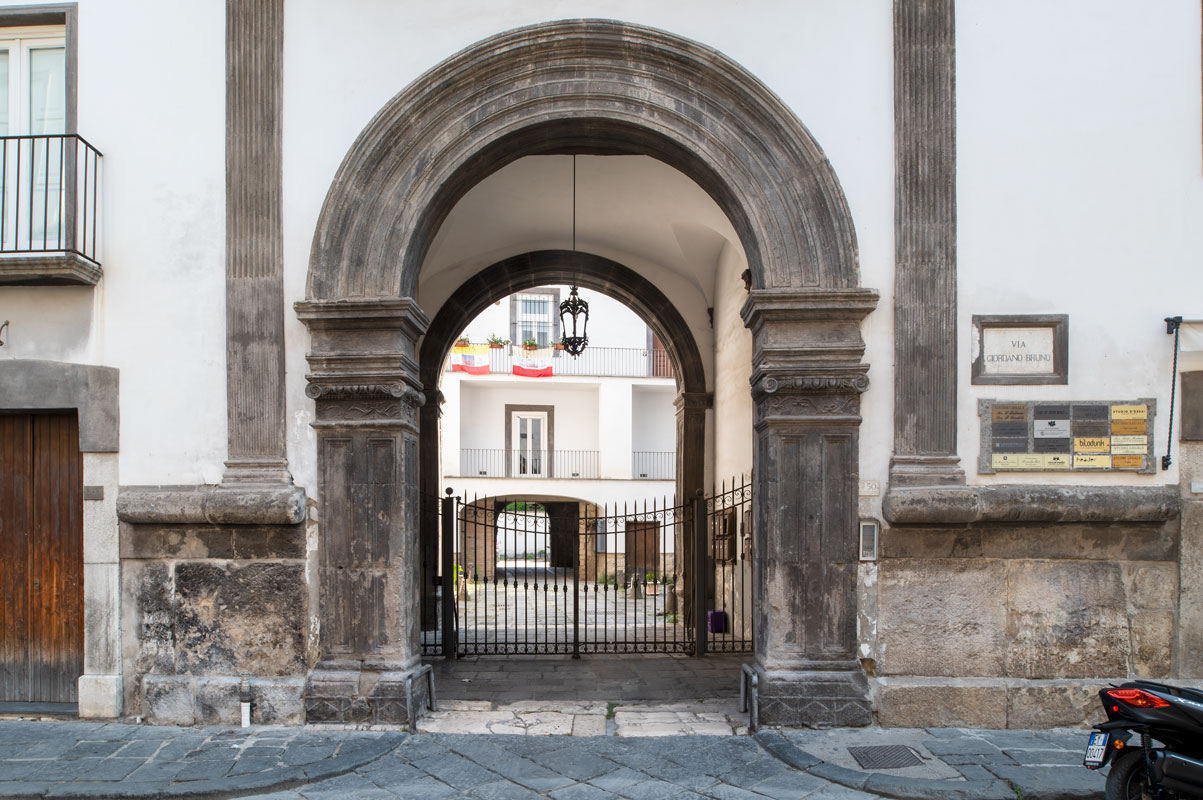
Palazzo Albertini–Govoni, Nola. Façade and detail of the sixteenth-century portal

The Orsini Palace in Nola provides one such example. Built during the 1460s, it was enlarged and redecorated approximately forty years later. Within the palace, Catalan and Renaissance elements coexist. The façade was designed upon a plinth of distinctly Catalan derivation reminiscent of that of Palazzo Sanseverino, characterised by a toroidal moulding. Decorative details such as window jambs and other architectural elements contribute to the uniqueness of the Nola building, whose appearance results from the inseparable fusion of archaic and classical forms.

More mature in its composition is Palazzo Albertini in Nola. Constructed at the beginning of the sixteenth century by the Albertini family and later acquired by the Covoni (or Govoni) family, the building has retained its original artistic and architectural character despite subsequent alterations. Its style has been attributed to craftsmen associated with Giovanni Francesco Mormando.

The façade closely follows the composition of Naples' Palazzo Marigliano. A double order of pilasters articulates the rhythm of the principal elevation along Via Giordano Bruno. The principal difference between the Neapolitan and Nola palaces lies in the inversion of the architectural orders. In the latter, following Vitruvian convention, the Corinthian order appears on the ground floor and the Composite order on the principal floor. The Neapolitan palace appears more balanced and compact, reflecting the mature Renaissance principles of the early sixteenth century, whereas in the Nola example the piperno architectural members seem to float against the wall surface without generating the same tension achieved by Mormando. Significantly, the moulded piperno band that mediates between the pilasters and the white-plastered wall panels is absent, while the architectural members themselves appear disproportionate in relation to the canonical dimensions of the classical orders.

Of particular interest is the Mormandean Ionic portal, which differs from Mormando's original portals by means of a slightly more compressed capital design. The toroidal plinth, an archaism deriving from Catalan traditions, incorporates fragments of entablature originating from ancient Nola.

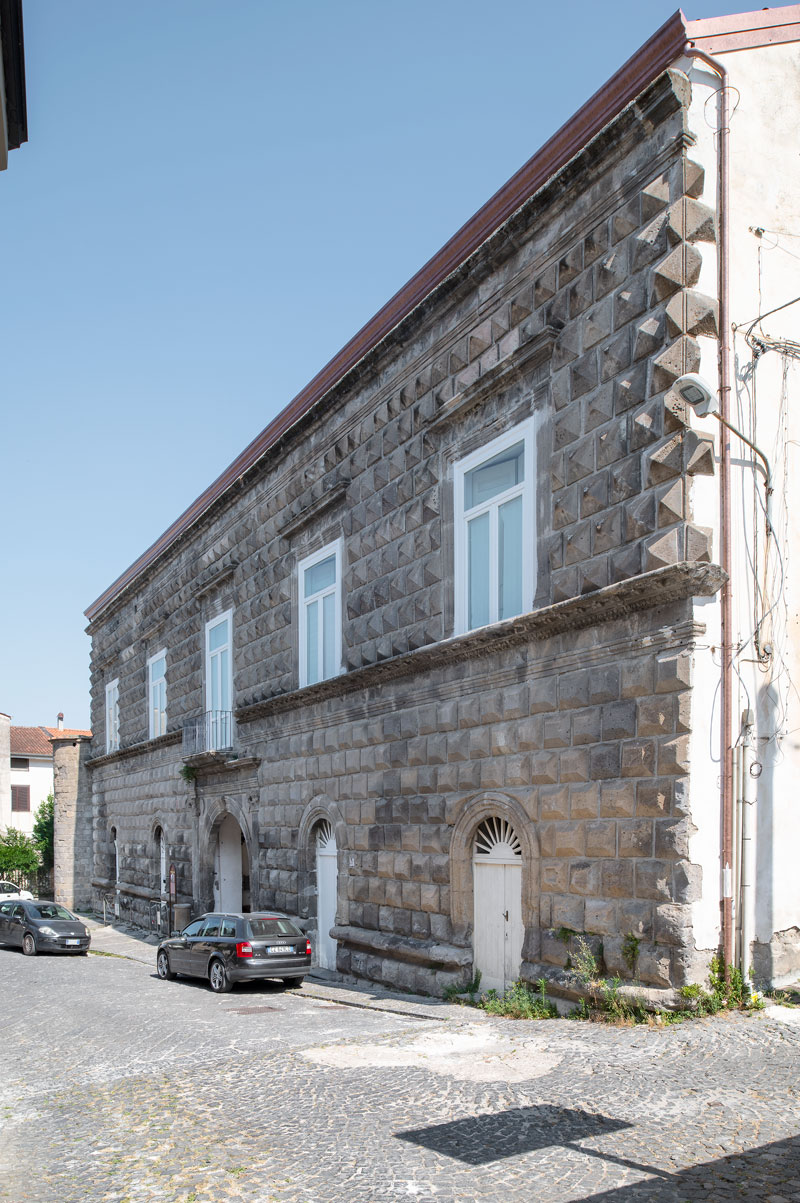
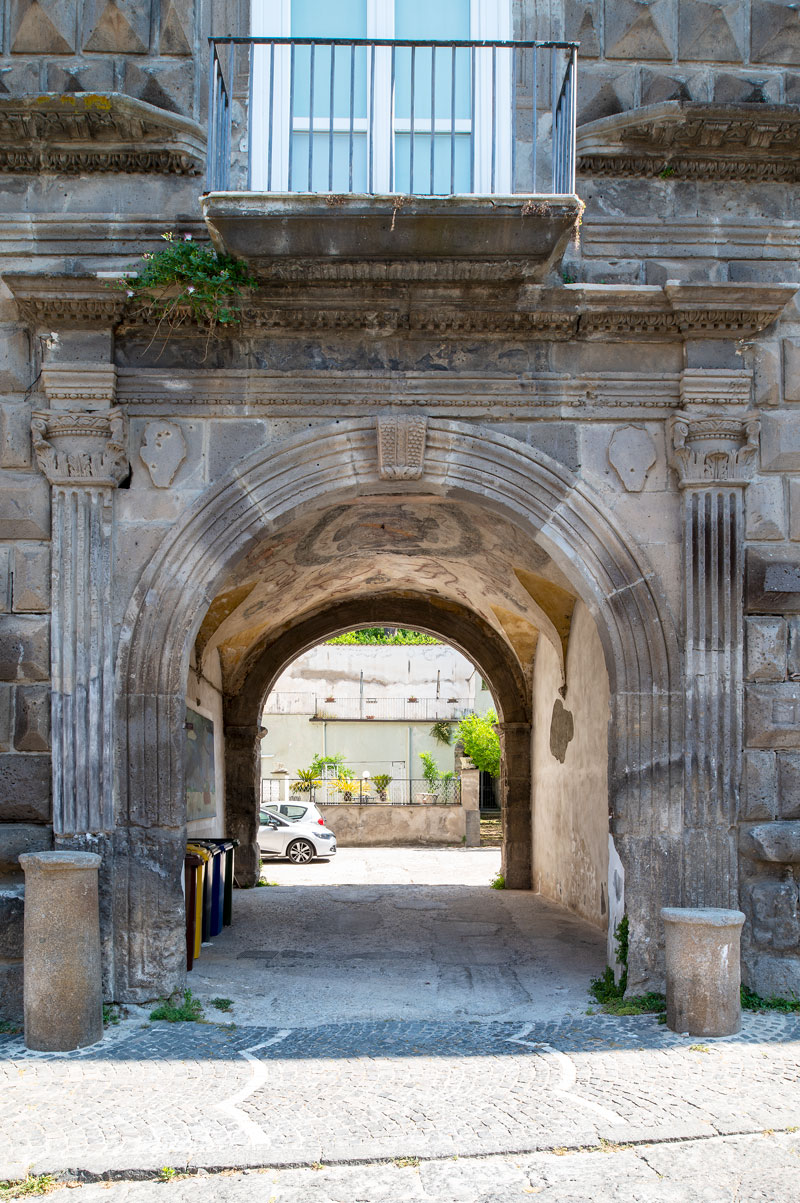
Palazzo del Cappellano (or Palazzo dei Tufi), Lauro (Avellino). The building has been attributed to Gabriele d'Agnolo during the early sixteenth century.

A more mature Renaissance language began to emerge during the second decade of the 16th century through the incorporation of classical elements. One of the most accomplished buildings erected in the Campanian hinterland is the so-called Palazzo del Cappellano in Lauro. Commissioned by Giovanni Cappellani, Bishop of Bovino and private chamberlain to Pope Julius II, construction began in 1513 and continued for at least fifteen years. The building represents a successful example of rustic Renaissance architecture.

The façade, inspired by the Neapolitan Sanseverino palace, is characterised by extensive use of diamond-point rustication on the upper level and smooth cushion-shaped rustication on the ground floor, separated by a string-course entablature. The base is distinguished by a toroidal moulding of clear Catalan inspiration. Particularly significant is the portal, executed in grey tuff stone, consisting of a banded semicircular arch framed by two Corinthian pilasters supporting an entablature.

According to some scholars, Giovanni Cappellani's presence at the papal court in Rome played a decisive role in shaping the architectural choices adopted for the palace. It has been hypothesised that in the months immediately following the death of Julius II, Cappellani played a prominent role in organising the conclave for the election of the next pope and may have come into contact with Giuliano da Sangallo. Through Sangallo's reconstruction drawing of the Arch of Augustus of Fano, the bishop may have found inspiration for his residence. The identity of the architect responsible for executing the project remains unknown, although some scholars have proposed Gabriele Agnolo.

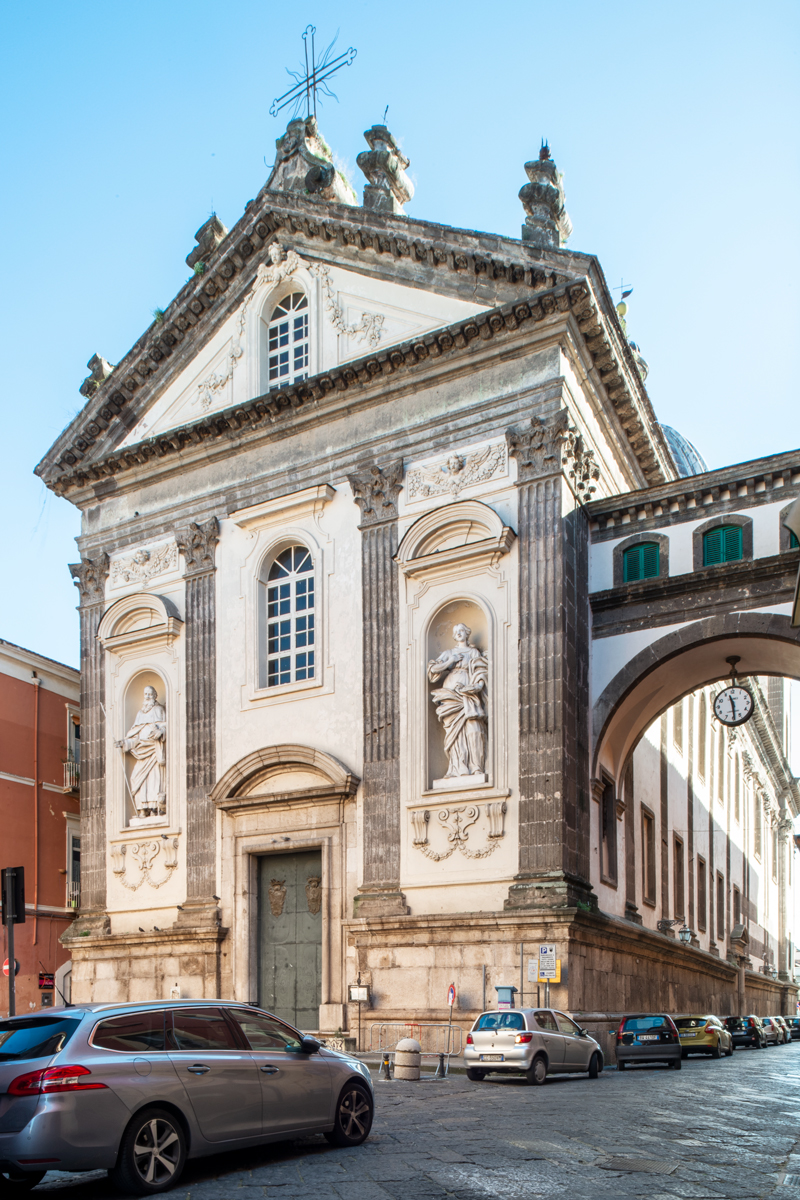
Church of the Annunciation, Capua

In Capua, despite the survival of architectural examples still linked to Catalan influences from the mid-fifteenth century, the transition to a more mature Renaissance style occurred through the construction of the small palace on Via Pier della Vigna. Built during the closing years of the fifteenth century, the building possesses two unfinished representative façades and a square courtyard that constitutes one of the purest and most beautiful compositions of the Neapolitan Renaissance.

The courtyard is organised around a single arch on each side framed by corner pilasters. The strongly Florentine character of the design led Roberto Pane to propose the presence of Giuliano da Maiano in the capital of the Terra di Lavoro.

The Church of the Annunciation, also in Capua, represents the highest expression of Renaissance architecture within the municipality. Medieval in origin, the church was declared unsafe and underwent a radical reconstruction in Renaissance forms beginning in 1521. The new building was conceived as a classical temple set upon a high stylobate of limestone taken from the nearby Amphitheatre of Capua, above which rise Corinthian pilasters supporting a continuous entablature that forms a pediment on the principal façade.

The façade is divided into three bays by pilasters and features a central portal surmounted by a large window, while two large niches occupy the lateral bays. The building was altered during eighteenth-century Baroque renovations, which removed the original decorative programme except for the piperno framework of its principal architectural elements.

The overall composition of the structure recalls, on a monumental scale, the small Santa Maria della Stella alle Paparelle church in Naples. This similarity suggests that the original design may have been provided by Giovanni Francesco Mormando, who had already worked for the Casa dell'Annunziata of Capua in the late fifteenth century on the construction of two organs, both well documented. Following his death, the project was completed by others.

Mormando's presence in the Terra di Lavoro is further documented by contracts signed with the Casa dell'Annunziata in Aversa, where from 1520 onwards he supplied designs for the enlargement of the hospital attached to the monastery. No Renaissance elements of that complex survive today due to repeated rebuilding campaigns in subsequent centuries.

=== The evolution of sculpture within Classicism ===
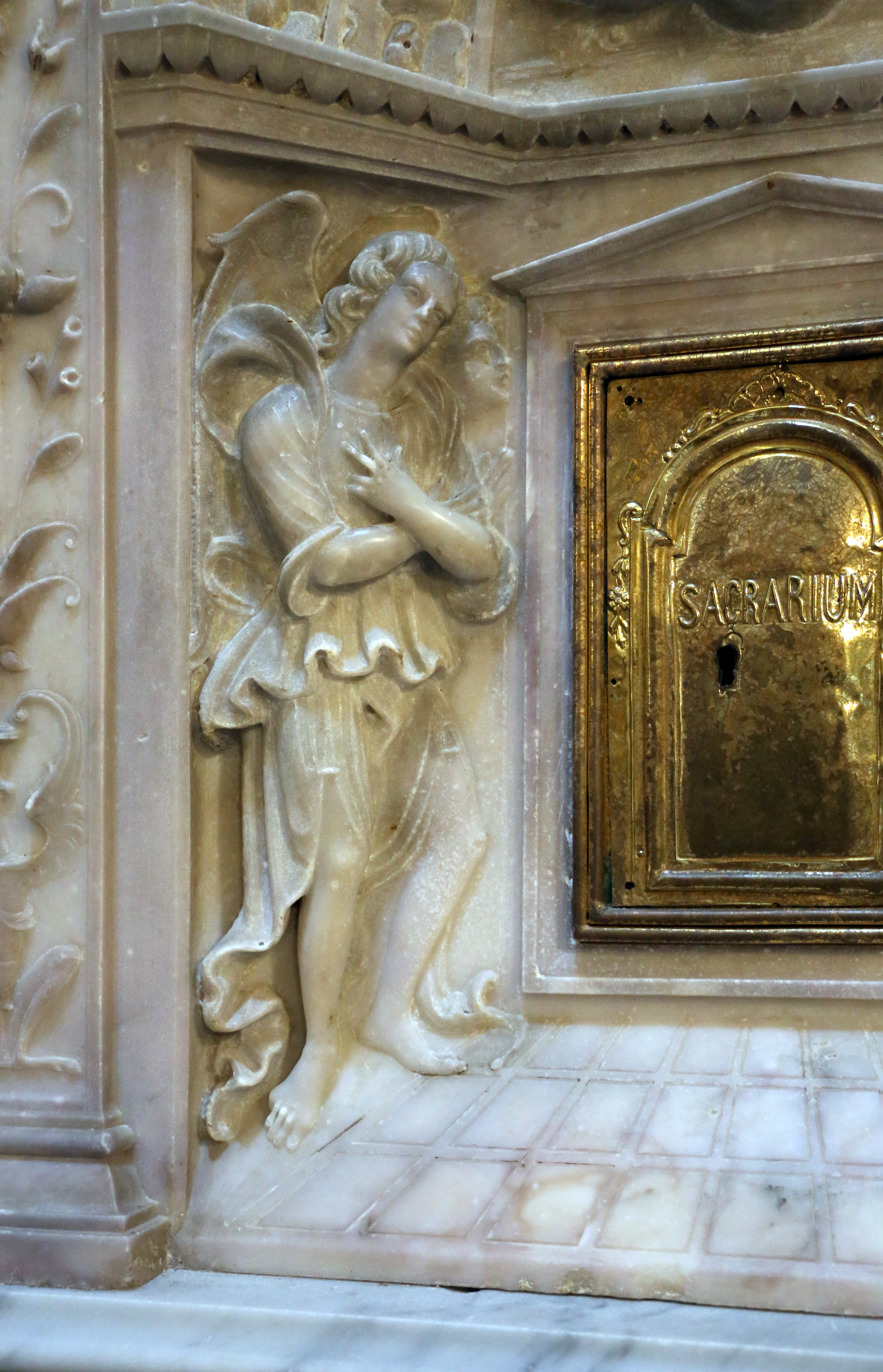
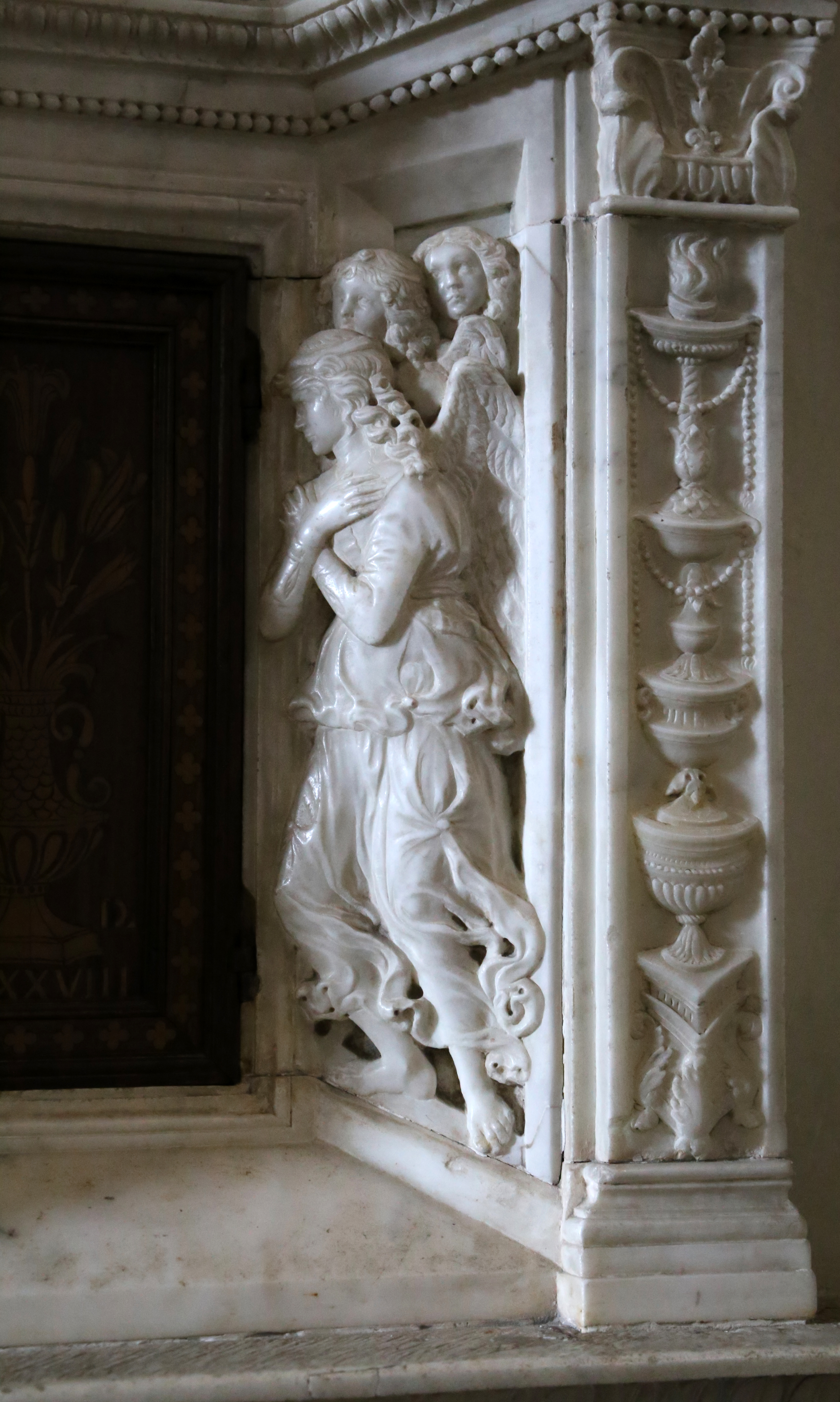
Detail of the tabernacle of the Co-cathedral of Castellammare co-Cathedral (attrib. Andrea Ferrucci), left, and the tabernacle of the Badia a Settimo (attrib. Giuliano da Maiano), right.

The sculptural landscape between the late 15th century and the beginning of the 16th century was particularly varied. Tuscan influences were gradually absorbed into the artistic milieu of the city, generating original sculptural works. Sixteenth-century sculpture found its archetypal figure in the already mentioned Giovanni da Nola.

Of particular interest is the connection between the activity of Tuscan artists in Naples at the end of the 15th century and the beginning of the following century, which was closely linked to the Aragonese court and the presence of important Florentine banking families. The presence of the Strozzi and probably also the Gondi in the Mediterranean capital of the peninsula fostered a flourishing market for Florentine artistic workshops at the dawn of the new century. Against this background, Florentine artists contributed to the dissemination of the mature artistic language of the late 15th century. Alongside them emerged a generation of "second-generation" sculptors, namely Tuscans who were not trained in their homeland but in Naples itself, serving their apprenticeships in the workshops of these masters.

One of the most representative sculptors of this period was Andrea Ferrucci. He settled in the city between 1487 and 1493, the dates corresponding to the earliest and latest documentary evidence of his presence. A second stay occurred about fifteen years later, though it was much shorter and intended solely for the completion of the Carafa Chapel of Santa Severina in San Domenico Maggiore. His family ties with Antonio Marchesi da Settignano, whose daughter he married, and consequently with Giuliano da Maiano and Benedetto da Maiano, all connected to the Florentine Gondi, strongly influenced Ferrucci's artistic language. The influence of the two Fiesolan brothers can be discerned in his carved works, such as the ciborium of the Co-cathedral of Castellammare, which may be compared with the tabernacle of Badia a Settimo, executed by Giuliano roughly fifty years earlier.

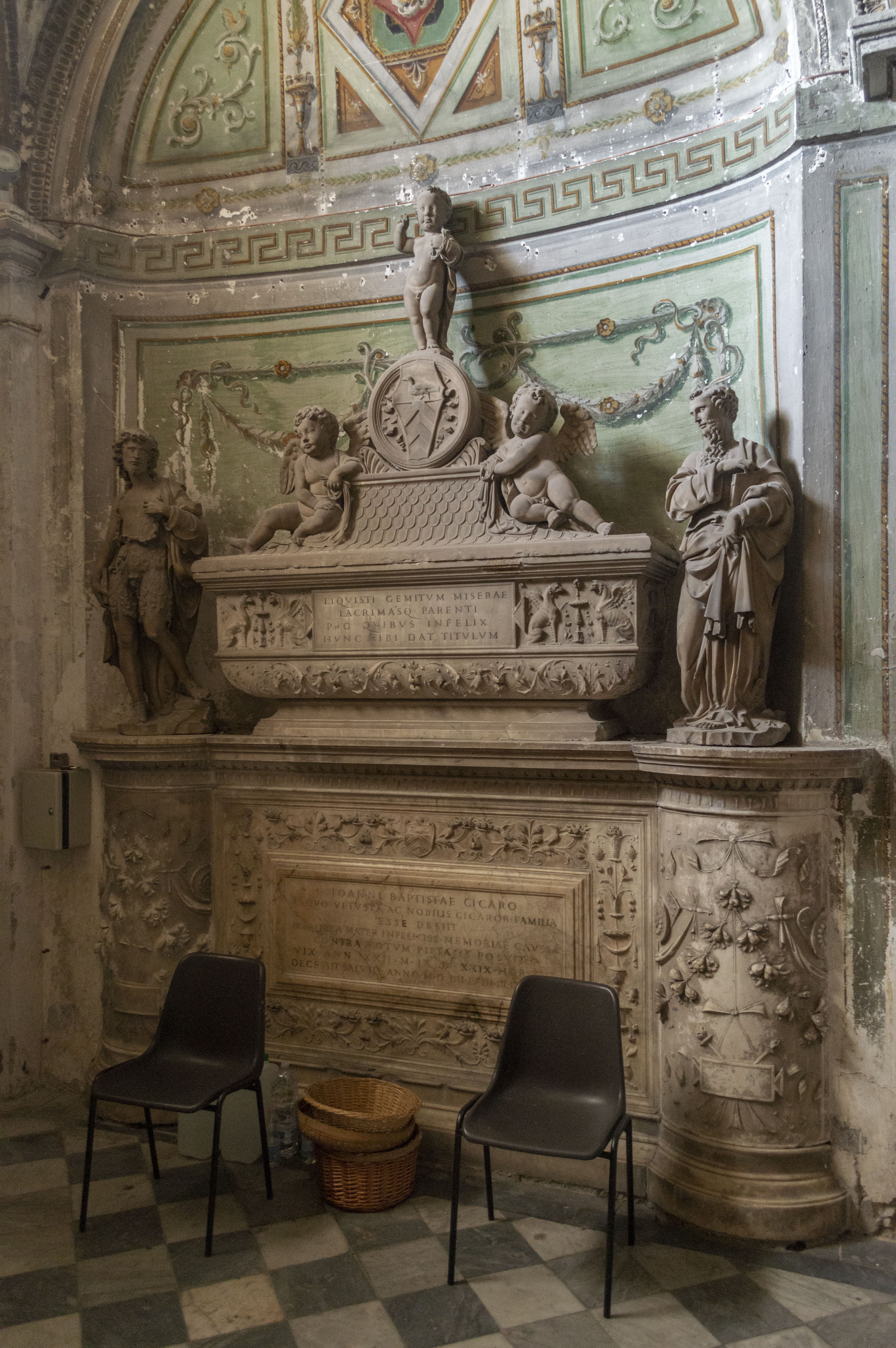
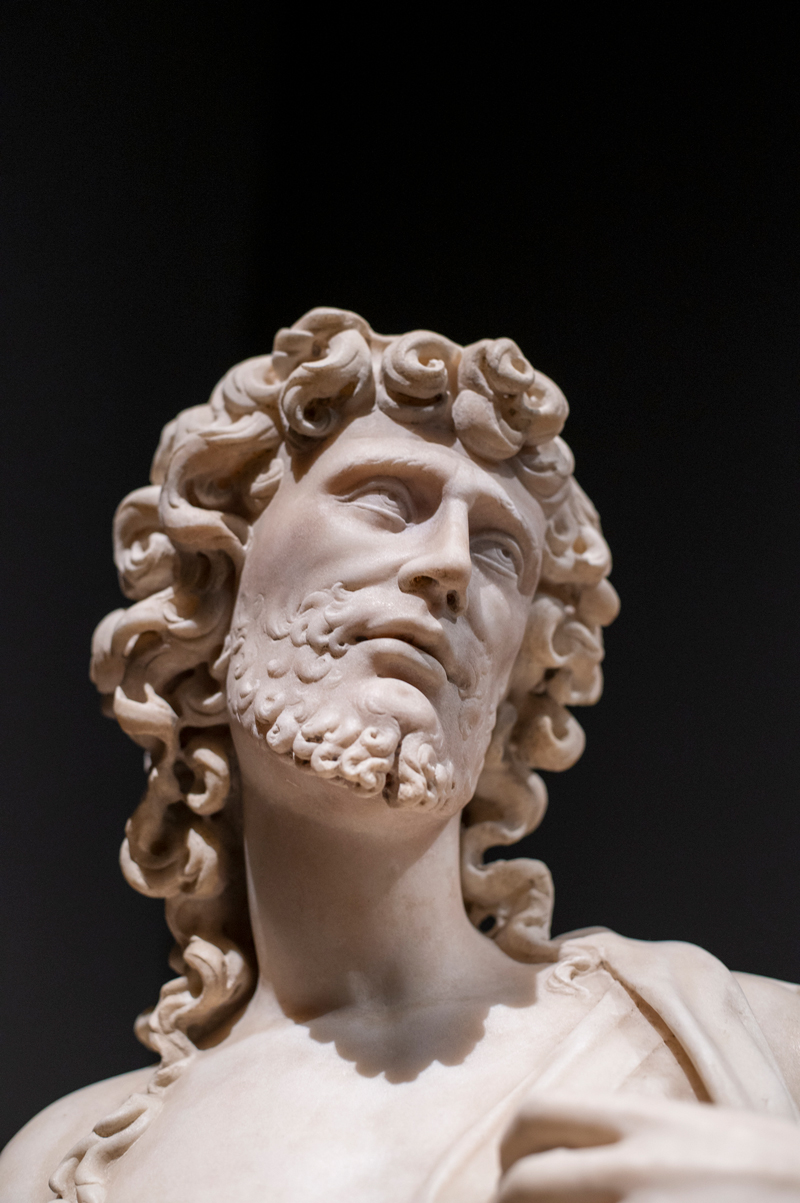
Andrea Ferrucci, Tomb of Giovan Battista Cicaro in Santi Severino e Sossio, c. 1510, and detail of the figure of Saint John the Baptist at the left side of the monument.

During his Neapolitan period he executed the Tomb of Giovanni Battista Cicaro, completed during the years in which he was working on the Chapel of Santa Severina in San Domenico Maggiore. The monument is preserved in the ante-sacristy of the Santi Severino e Sossio and displays a mature artistic language far removed from his original Maianesque background. Its pyramidal composition represented an innovation within the Neapolitan context and was subsequently adopted by other sculptors of his circle. The broad base, bearing a dedicatory inscription, is entirely decorated with grotesques. Statues of saints stand at either side of the funerary urn, which is surmounted by putti, while the family coat of arms occupies the centre and is crowned by a standing putto. Art historian Riccardo Naldi described this funerary monument as a "tomb-tabernacle" because its constituent elements appear to derive from altars and tabernacles. One of Ferrucci's followers was Romolo Balsimelli, whom the sculptor employed as an assistant in 1505.

Among the Tuscans active in the former capital of the kingdom was Vittorio di Buonaccorso Ghiberti, great-grandson of Lorenzo Ghiberti. His presence is documented only briefly from 1521 onward. The scarcity of biographical information makes it impossible to reconstruct his artistic profile in detail, although he was remembered as a complete artist skilled in sculpture, painting and architecture in the fullest Renaissance tradition. Ghiberti certainly executed a series of busts incorporated into the façade of Palazzo Orsini di Gravina. The medallions located between the arches of the palace courtyard may also be attributed to him.

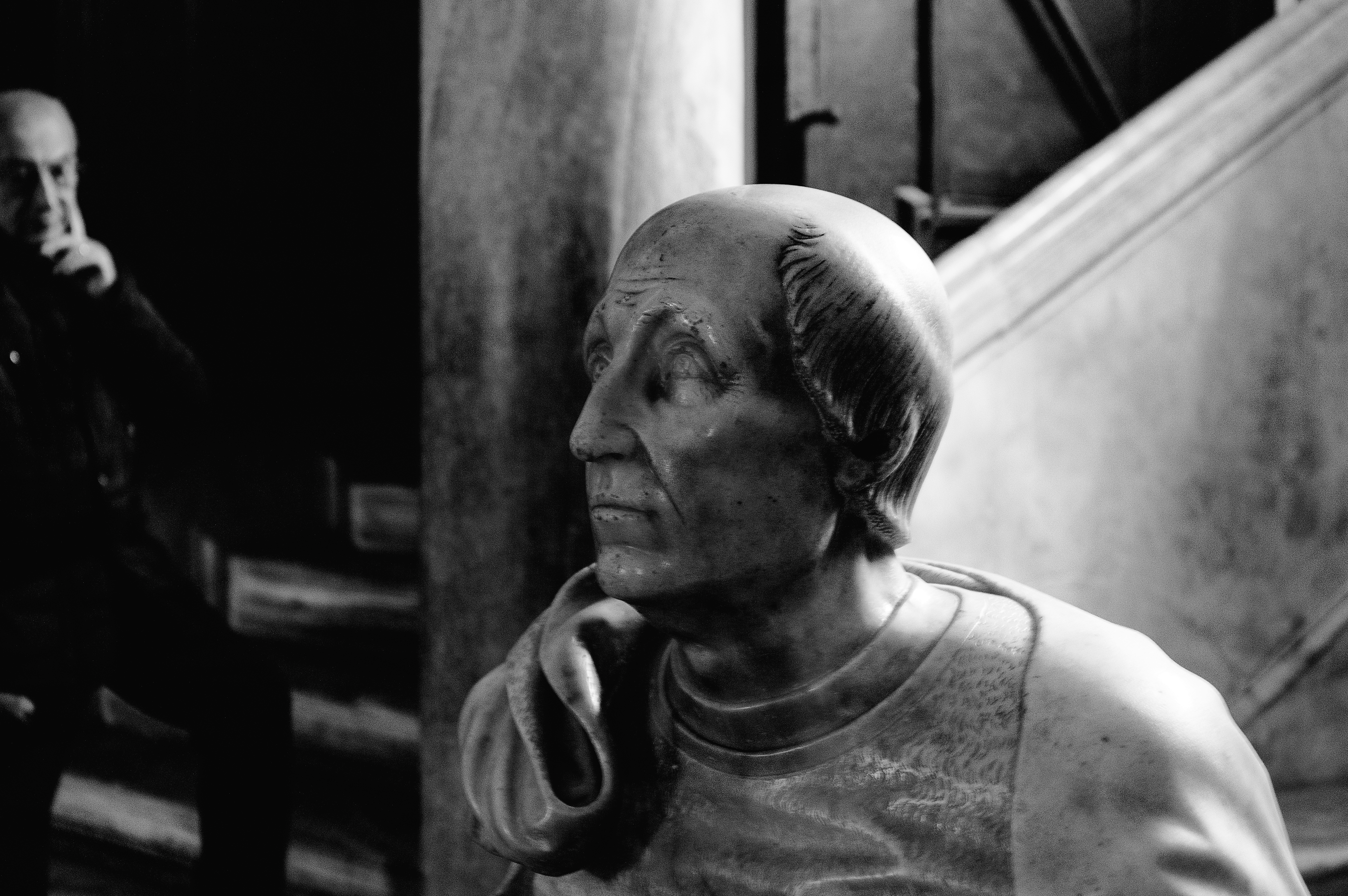
Giovan Tommaso Malvito, Oliviero Carafa in the Succorpo Chapel, 1508

The second current, and the most productive from an artistic standpoint, was linked to the Lombard school. Continuing the artistic language of Jacopo della Pila and Tommaso Malvito, it found its principal representative in Giovan Tommaso Malvito, son of Tommaso. The Malvito workshop was regarded as one of the most prolific in the city and exerted a significant influence on sculptors working within the Lombard Classicist tradition, characterised by its exuberant phytomorphic decoration. The workshop's production was so extensive that it may be divided into a fifteenth-century phase, during which father and son frequently collaborated, and a sixteenth-century phase in which Giovan Tommaso assumed the leading role following his father's death in 1508.

The activity of the Malvito workshop is exemplified by the Cappellone del Crocifisso in San Domenico Maggiore, where Giovan Tommaso executed the Tomb of Ettore Carafa together with his father, as well as the Tomb of Troilo Carafa, both completed between the first and second decades of the sixteenth century. Documentary evidence from contemporary notarial records also attests to a collaboration between Giovanni da Nola and the Malvito workshop in the execution of the Tomb of Galeazzo Pandone, likewise in San Domenico Maggiore. The monument is dated 1514. The flourishing activity of the workshop extended beyond the capital of the viceroyalty. In 1518 it completed the entrance portal of the Complesso dell'Annunziata in Aversa on commission from Jacopo Mormile.

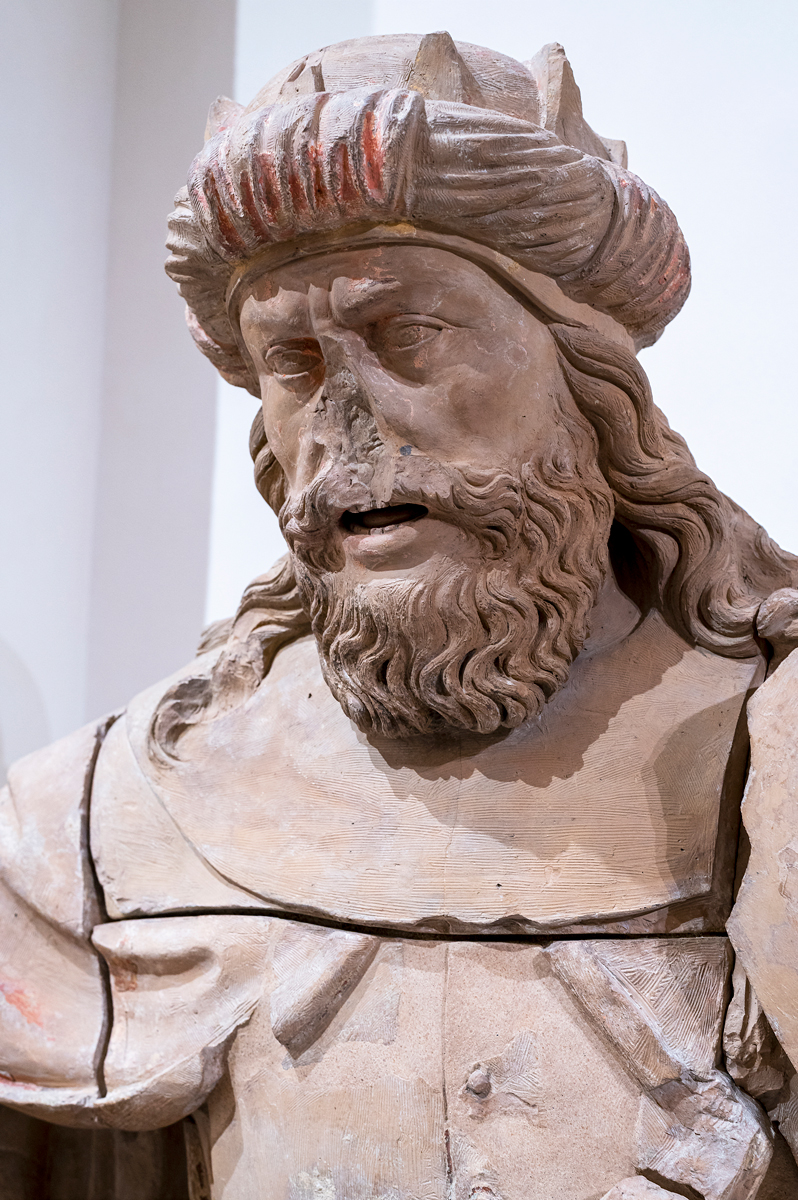
Domenico Napoletano, detail of King Solomon from the Cona dei Lanii, 1508–1517, National Museum of San Martino

The most mature works produced by the workshop under Giovan Tommaso's direction were the Tomb of Bishop Giovan Maria Poderico (1525) in Basilica of San Lorenzo Maggiore, the Tomb of Giovan Jacopo del Tocco in the Cathedral of Naples, and the Chapel of Saint Roch in Santa Maria delle Grazie Maggiore a Caponapoli, built between 1517 and 1524 as the burial place of Giovannello de Cuncto and his wife Lucrezia Filangieri di Candida. In the latter project Malvito was responsible both for the funerary monuments and for the architectural framework of the chapel, realised according to the most accomplished forms of Classical Renaissance architecture.

Within the context of Lombard-Neapolitan artistic culture must also be placed the work of local sculptors. One of the defining characteristics of these artists was their ability to combine sculptural techniques and expressive languages of very different origins. Terracotta sculpture, introduced to the city by Guido Mazzoni in the closing years of the fifteenth century, quickly attracted the attention of patrons and artists interested in exploring its possibilities as a sculptural medium. One of the most skilled practitioners in terracotta was Domenico Napoletano, an artist who remains relatively understudied in the historiography of Neapolitan art between the fifteenth and sixteenth centuries.

The Altar of Saint Roch in San Lorenzo Maggiore, whose attribution remains uncertain, is entirely executed in terracotta and displays characteristics typical of late fifteenth-century Lombard sculpture. This suggests that the sculptor may have trained in Lombard workshops active in the city or, at the very least, absorbed their compositional models through indirect influence.

[...] In the church of Sant'Eligio there is also a great work in terracotta in the chapel of the Lanii by the hand of Maestro Domenico Napoletano, a most ingenious man.

— Pietro Summonte, Lettera a Marcantonio Michiel, 1524

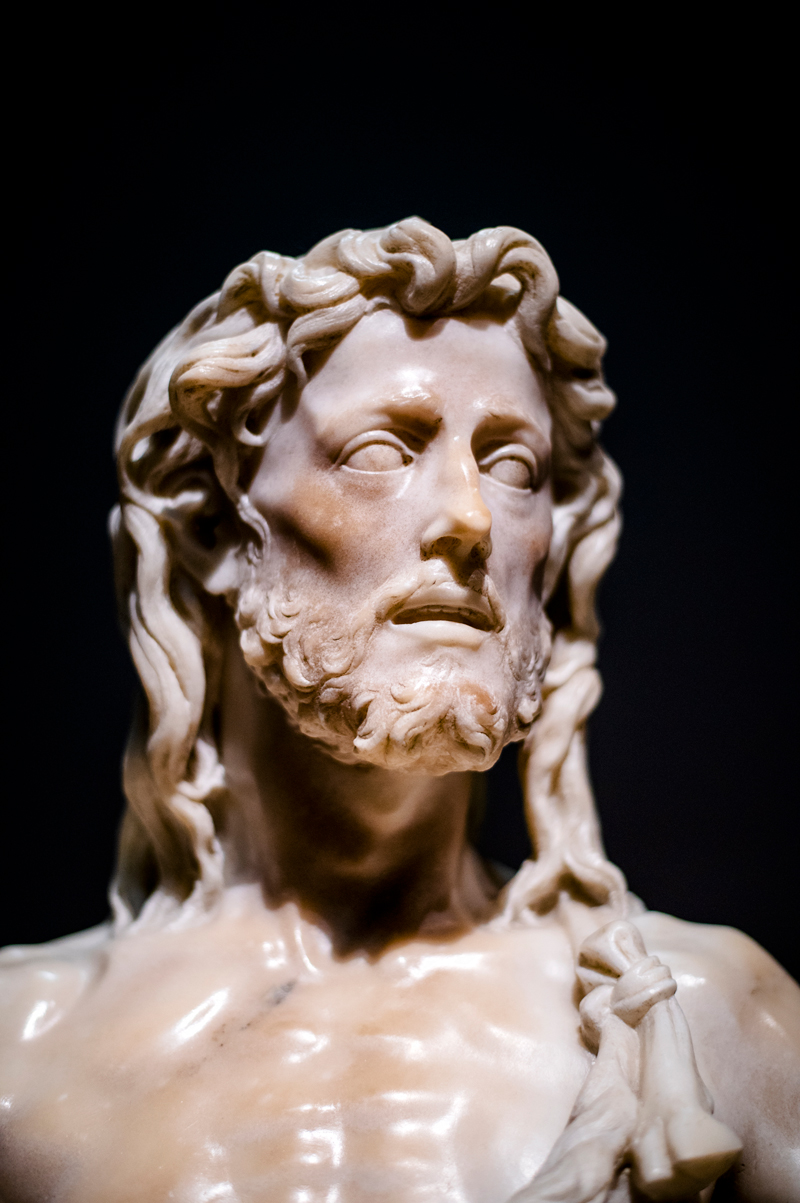
Girolamo Santacroce, Ecce Homo Agnus Dei. Detail of Saint John the Baptist.

His most important work, and the one securely attributed to him, is the Cona dei Lanii, begun in 1508 and completed in 1517. The work was commissioned by the guild of the Lanii, or butchers, for their chapel in Sant'Eligio Maggiore. It is now preserved in the National Museum of San Martino. In its overall conception the sculpture still reflects Lombard influence. The architectural framework closely recalls the mouldings and portals produced by the Malvito workshop. The individual ornamental elements that compose the scenes, however, reveal a more mature language closer to developments taking place simultaneously in Rome, both in sculpture and painting.

The Madonna and Child shows Raphaelesque influences, demonstrating the Neapolitan sculptor's ability to keep pace with changing artistic languages at the turn of the century.

In the field of wooden sculpture, mention should be made of Fra Giovanni da Verona, who in 1506 executed the choir stalls for the Tolosa Chapel and which were later adapted for the sacristy of Sant'Anna dei Lombardi. His mastery in creating delicate perspectival effects through the use of different woods, thereby imparting a pictorial quality to the composition, testifies to the high level attained during the Italian Renaissance in the application of techniques and theories developed a century earlier.

A third strand of Neapolitan sculpture was represented by the Neapolitan sculptor Girolamo Santacroce. Belonging to the circle of artists gravitating around Giovanni da Nola, he was able to interpret and synthesise in an original manner the influences of contemporary sculpture produced in other Italian courts, particularly Florence after the first Medici period and papal Rome. This awareness resulted from continual artistic updating through travel and contacts with artists arriving from the Eternal City and active in Naples during the first three decades of the sixteenth century.

[...] There is also another, younger man, about twenty-two years old, Girolamo Santacroce, who was first a goldsmith and then turned to marble with such excellence of talent that, should he live, he will undoubtedly become great in his art. He has portrayed Sannazaro in a medal and made a marble Apollo, works highly esteemed here by all.

— Pietro Summonte, Lettera a Marcantonio Michiel, 1524

Santacroce came from a family of goldsmiths and was himself trained in that craft. Like Giovanni da Nola, he turned to marble sculpture during the decorative works for the Caracciolo di Vico Chapel in San Giovanni a Carbonara, where he executed the statue of Saint John the Baptist. In this sculpture, Santacroce demonstrated his precocious artistic talent through a particularly sensitive and realistic treatment of the marble surface.

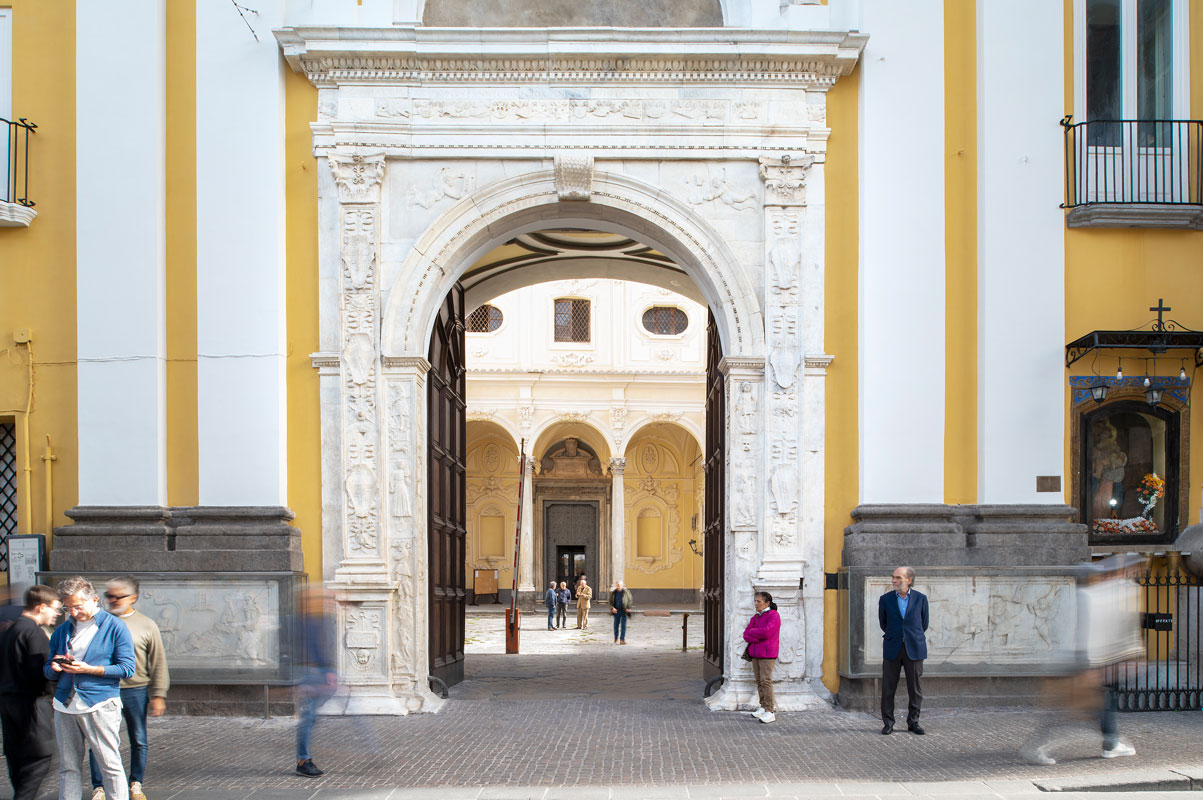
Entrance portal of the Church of the Annunziata, Aversa. Attributed to the Malvito workshop.

Around 1520 Santacroce executed one of the masterpieces of sixteenth-century Neapolitan sculpture, the altarpiece of the Madonna delle Grazie in Sant'Aniello a Caponapoli. In creating this marble reredos, the sculptor was probably influenced by Raphael's Madonna of Foligno, painted approximately a decade earlier. This aspect resulted from the reworking of formal models derived from his association with Bartolomé Ordóñez and Diego Siloe, interpreted through a Raphaelesque visual language.

Between 1521 and 1522 he stayed in Carrara, together with Giovan Giacomo da Brescia, in order to complete works left unfinished by Diego Siloe. Upon returning to Naples he executed another masterpiece of early sixteenth-century Neapolitan sculpture, the Altare del Pezzo in Sant'Anna dei Lombardi. In this work Santacroce adapted compositional schemes derived from the funerary sculpture of Andrea Sansovino, particularly the Tombs of Cardinals Ascanio Sforza and Girolamo Basso della Rovere in Santa Maria del Popolo in Rome.

The compositional maturity achieved by Santacroce, both in freestanding sculpture and in the execution of complex sculptural ensembles such as altarpieces and marble reredoses, was the object of profound admiration on the part of Giorgio Vasari, who ultimately included him in his Lives.

Through the sculpture of Giovanni da Nola and Girolamo Santacroce, a fully developed Neapolitan school of sculpture came into being, characterised by original artistic personalities capable of competing for a central role within the artistic currents of the viceroyal capital and throughout the Kingdom, despite the constant attraction exerted by foreign artists. The flexibility of these local masters enabled them to absorb external influences as a stimulus for renewal while at the same time maintaining a connection with the artistic tradition that had taken shape during the early sixteenth century. These artists gave rise to the Neapolitan sculptural expression of the Mannerist age.

=== Naples as a crossroads of the Renaissance in the Mediterranean: Bartolomé Ordóñez and Diego Siloe ===
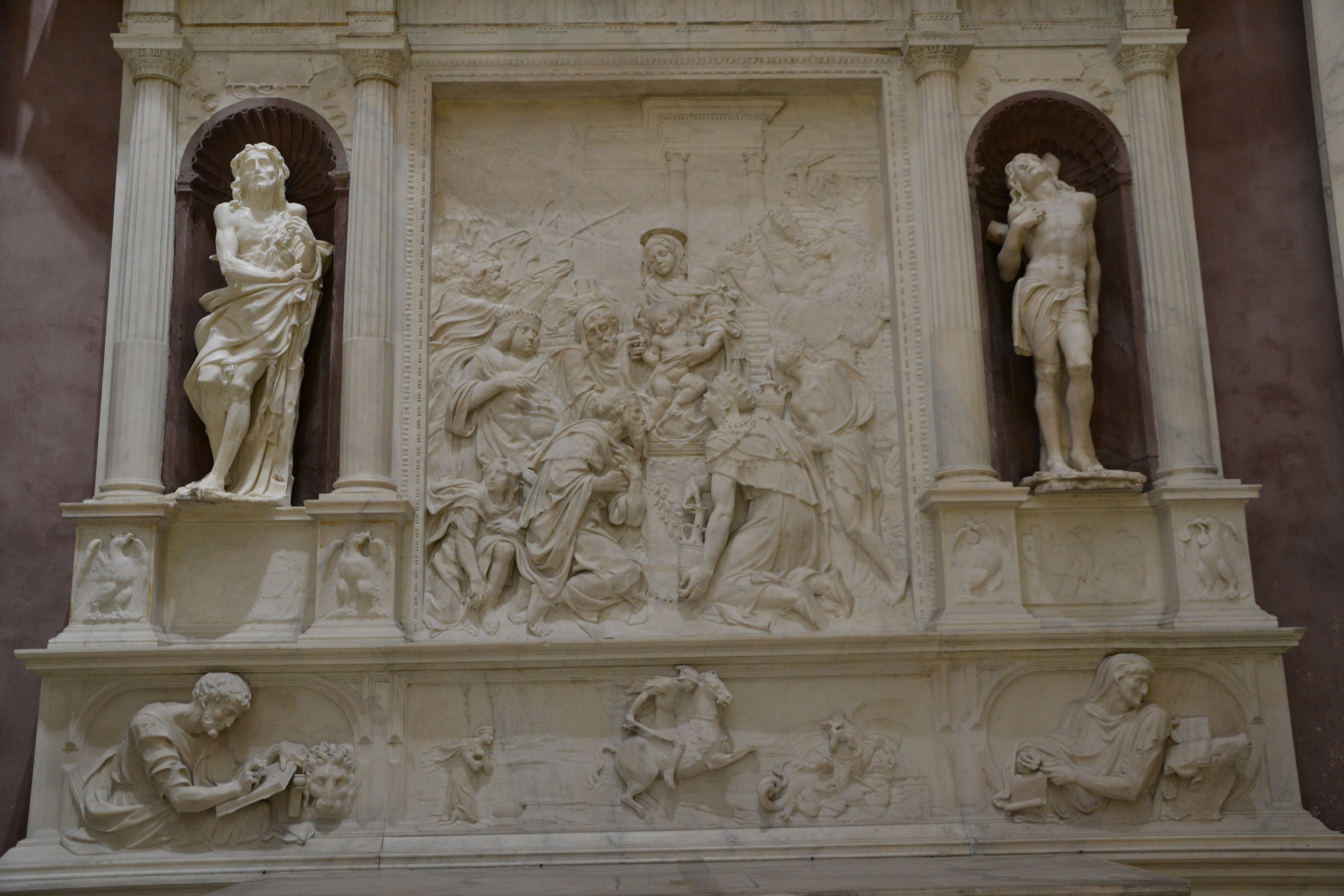
Diego Siloe and Bartolomé Ordóñez, detail of the Altarpiece of the Epiphany in San Giovanni a Carbonara

Naples at the end of the fifteenth century and the beginning of the sixteenth century established itself as an important commercial hub connecting the European states of the western Mediterranean Sea, with particularly strong links to Spain. Spain was also deeply integrated into pre-unification Italian society, especially in Rome, where the Borgia family had settled from the mid-15th century with the election of Pope Callixtus III, born Alfonso Borgia. The presence of Spanish nobles in the Kingdom of Naples and the Papal States fostered continuous cultural exchanges. In 1548, the Portuguese painter and theorist Francisco de Holanda, in his Dialogues in Rome, compiled a list of the leading European artists of his time, including the sculptors Bartolomé Ordóñez and Diego Siloe and the painters Alonso Berruguete and Pedro Machuca. The four artists later became the principal ambassadors of Italian classicism in Spain.

Little is known about the early artistic training of Ordóñez and Siloe, both natives of Burgos. At the beginning of the sixteenth century they left Spain and settled in Italy. Before establishing themselves in the capital of the kingdom, they certainly stayed in Florence and Rome, where they came into contact with the leading sculptural achievements of the period. In Naples they carried out a decisive phase of their early careers, lasting little more than a decade but marked by intense activity. Their departures occurred within a short time of one another: Ordóñez left for Carrara toward the end of the 1510s and died prematurely in 1520, while de Siloé returned to Spain in 1519 and never came back, becoming the foremost exponent of Italianate sculpture and architecture during the reign of Charles V.

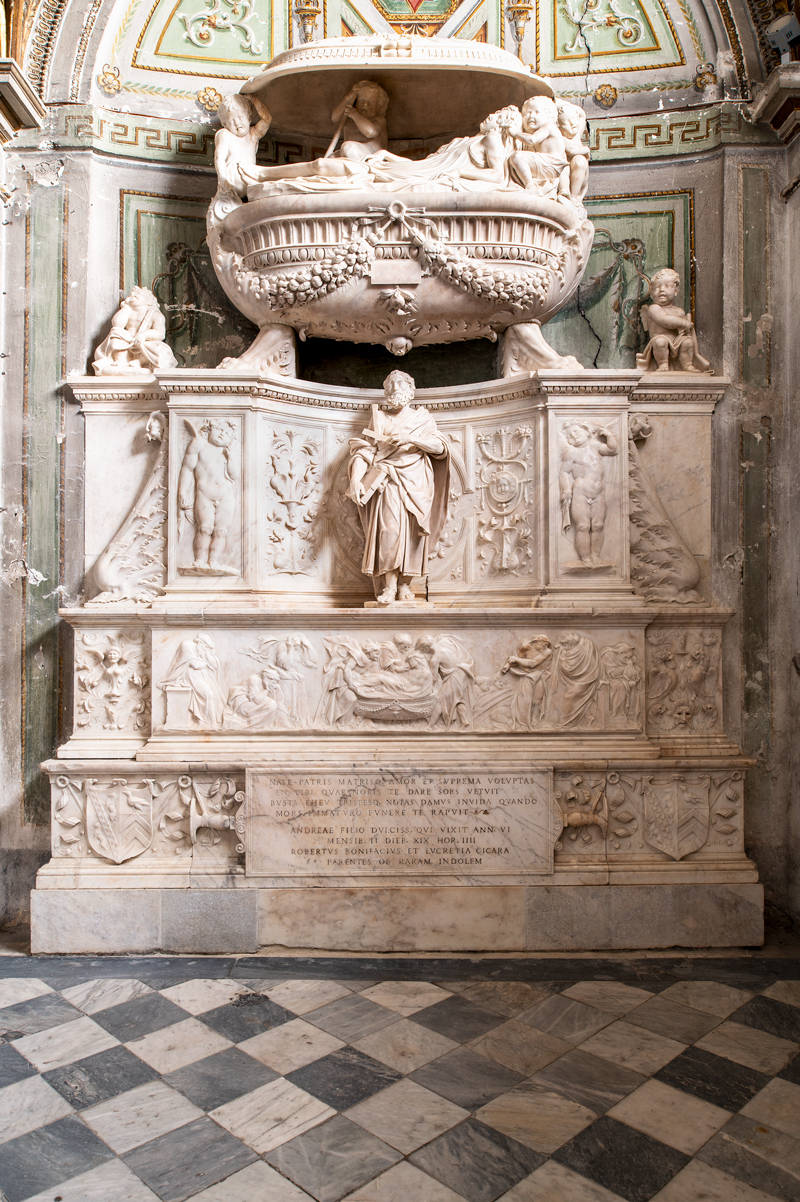
Bartolomé Ordóñez, Tomb of Andrea Bonifacio

The work of the two Spaniards in Naples was recalled several decades later by Giorgio Vasari, who visited the city in 1545. During his visit to San Giovanni a Carbonara, and particularly the Caracciolo di Vico Chapel, he encountered Ordóñez's most important work, the marble relief of the Adoration of the Magi. Vasari recorded this visit in the first edition of his Lives of the Most Excellent Painters, Sculptors, and Architects, published in 1550.

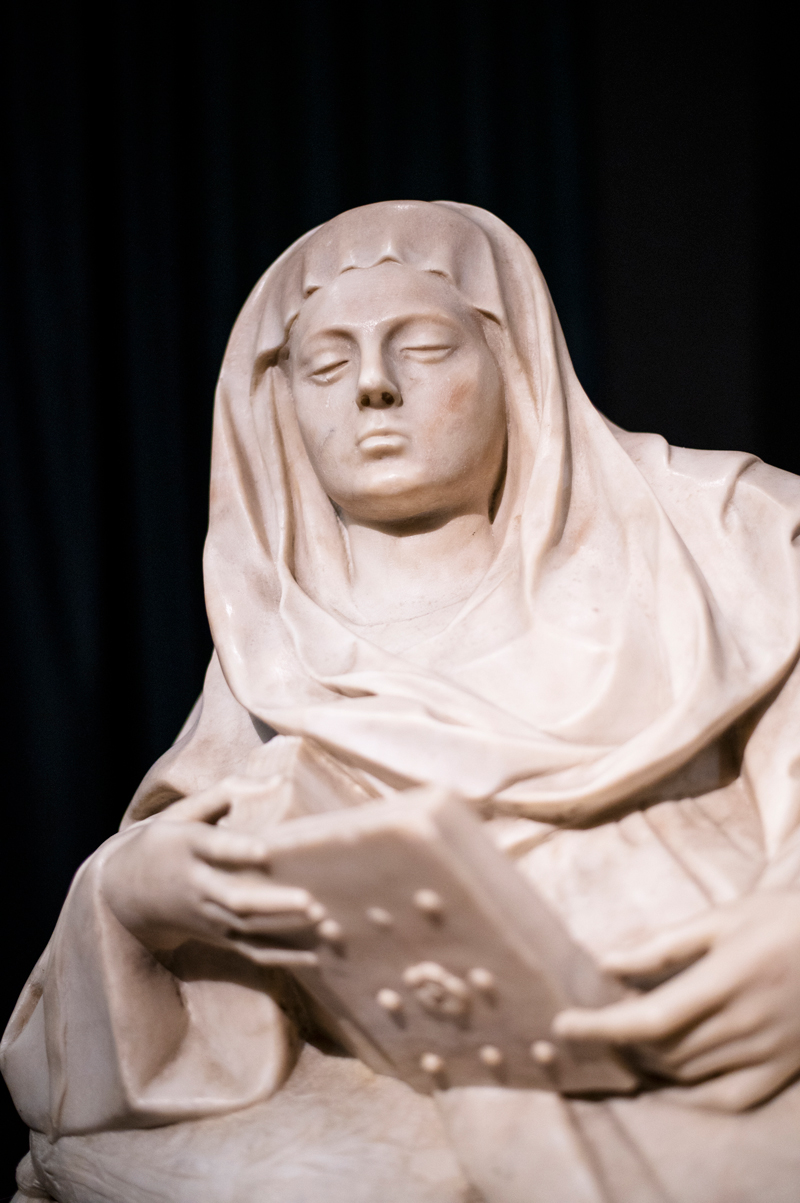
Diego Siloe, female portrait (Santa Maria Assunta dei Pignatelli)

[...] This man [Girolamo Santacroce, editor's note] worked in San Giovanni Carbonaro in Naples on the chapel of the Marquis of Vico, which is a round temple divided by columns and niches with several tombs carved with great diligence. And because the altarpiece of this chapel, in which the Magi offering gifts to Christ are represented in marble relief, is the work of a Spaniard.

— Giorgio Vasari, Lives, 1550 edition, 1878 edition

Vasari limited himself to mentioning Ordóñez's nationality and did not provide a fuller attribution of the work. In the seventeenth century, the writer Cesare D'Engenio, in his Napoli Sacra, identified the artist as Pietro di Piata, a sculptor documented in several sources but difficult to place within the years of Ordóñez's activity.

Through archival documentation preserved in both Italy and Spain, it has been possible to reconstruct Ordóñez's career as both a sculptor and an entrepreneur involved in the marble quarries of Lunigiana. His Neapolitan sojourn can be dated to around the middle of the second decade of the sixteenth century, although the documentary evidence does not allow a precise chronology. At the same time, the viceregal capital was embracing the artistic innovations of post-Medicean Florence and the Rome of Pope Julius II. One significant example was the panel commissioned by Girolamo del Doce for his chapel in San Domenico Maggiore, namely Raphael's Madonna with the Fish. The painting became a source of inspiration for many artists who began to embrace the maniera moderna. The two Spanish sculptors also studied Raphael's composition closely.

A key work by Ordóñez is the Saint Matthew and the Angel in San Pietro Martire. The sculpture, measuring 130 cm in height, was intended for a dedicated setting. The saint is represented in a dynamic pose characteristic of contemporary inventions by Michelangelo, particularly the figure of the Virgin in the Doni Tondo, comparable to the twisting movement of the angel's hand holding the book. Additional references may include Donatello's Sacrifice of Isaac and the figure of Pythagoras in Raphael's The School of Athens, particularly in the saint's calm expression while writing. Through this work, rich in references to Raphael, Michelangelo, and Donatello, Ordóñez pushed Neapolitan sculpture beyond the formal conventions of the fifteenth century and helped pave the way for Girolamo Santacroce and Giovanni da Nola.

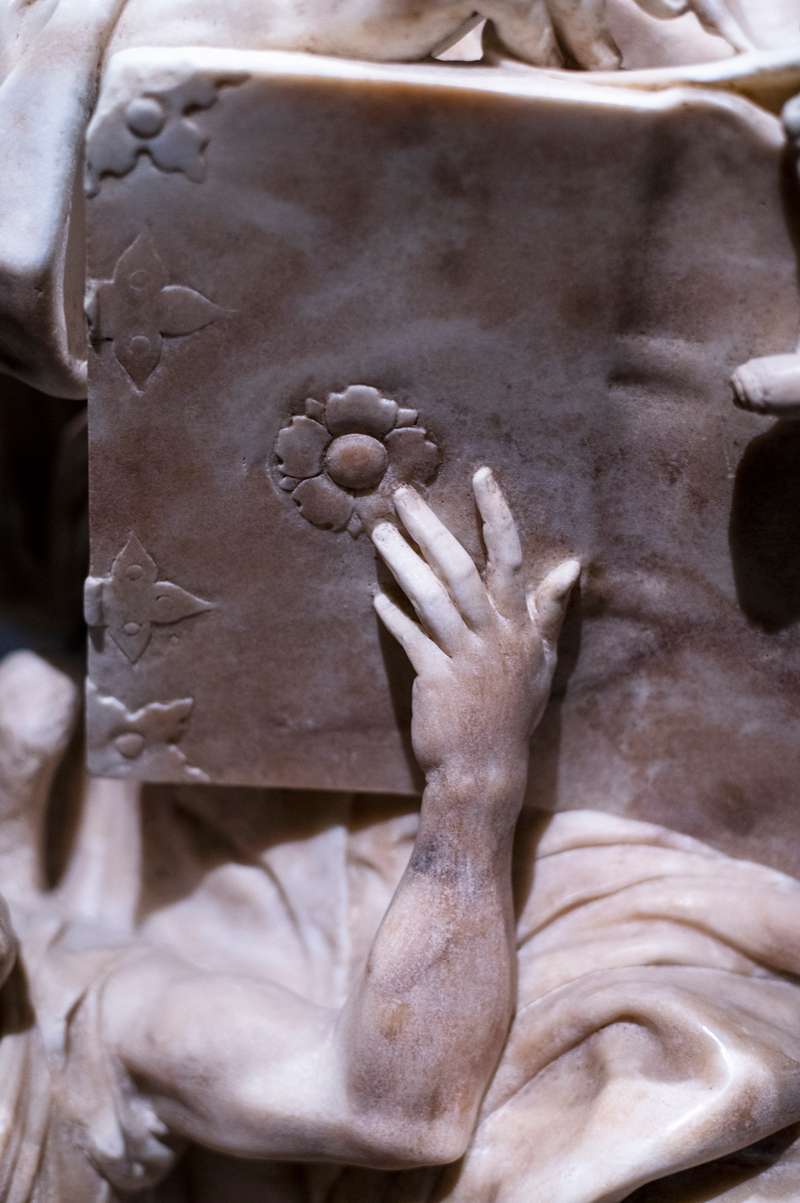
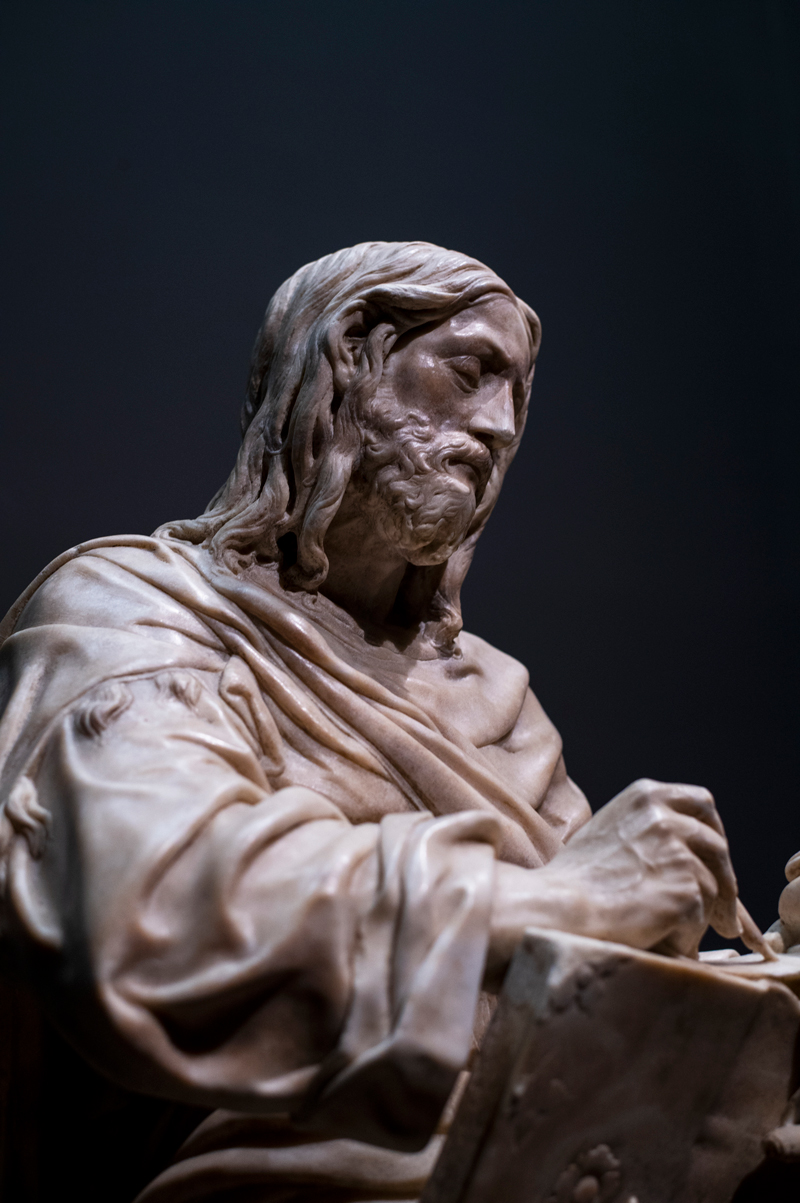
Ordóñez, detail of the angel's hand holding the book and the face of the saint as he writes.

By the middle of the second decade of the sixteenth century, work had begun on the first phase of the decorative programme of the Caracciolo di Vico Chapel. The entrance portal, dating to 1514–1515, was executed through the collaboration of Ordóñez and Diego Siloe. The latter's contribution can be compared with the decoration of the Doric entrance arch and with the Madonna and Child in the small Santa Maria Assunta dei Pignatelli, whose attribution remains uncertain. Some scholars, however, have assigned the work to de Siloé on the basis of stylistic comparisons with sculptures executed before his arrival in Naples and with minor works produced during his stay in the city.

In light of Giovanni Pontano's reflections on magnificence, which linked artistic excellence to both workmanship and the quality of materials employed, Galeazzo Caracciolo, patron of the chapel, entrusted the main altar to the two Spanish sculptors, assisted by the young Girolamo Santacroce. The focal point of the altar is the marble altarpiece at its centre, which also reflects Pontano's interpretation of the principles expressed by Leon Battista Alberti in De re aedificatoria, where sculptural decoration is recommended over painted decoration for the walls of sacred buildings.

Unlike the altarpieces created by the Da Maiano brothers and the Rossellino workshop at Monteoliveto, the altarpiece in San Giovanni a Carbonara demonstrates a strong continuity between sculpture and classical architectural framing, creating a remarkably unified composition. The central relief depicting the Adoration of the Magi reveals references to Leonardo da Vinci's Adoration of the Magi and to the version by Filippino Lippi, demonstrating Ordóñez's ability to absorb and reinterpret contemporary artistic models.

Among the sculptures surrounding the altarpiece, particular attention should be given to de Siloé's Dying Saint Sebastian. The work reveals clear references to the youthful Michelangelo of the Dying Slave, executed almost contemporaneously with the sculptures of the Caracciolo Chapel, and to the head of the Dying Alexander, a 1st-century BC sculpture preserved in Florence and now housed in the Uffizi.

The Tomb of Andrea Bonifacio represented one of the highest achievements of Ordóñez's sculptural career. Originally located in the lower church of Santi Severino e Sossio, it was moved at the end of the same century, together with Ferrucci's Cicaro tomb, to the area in front of the Medici Chapel, which served as an antechamber to the sacristy. Executed shortly after the works in the Caracciolo di Vico Chapel, the monument demonstrates Ordóñez's inventive approach to funerary sculpture, abandoning the traditional arcosolium scheme that still dominated aristocratic tombs.

The close relationship with Michelangelesque models, particularly ornamental solutions from the Tomb of Pope Julius II, suggests that the Spanish sculptor may have had direct contact with Michelangelo himself or at least with his designs. References to other works are also present. The deceased is portrayed in a pose recalling Mars in Sandro Botticelli's Venus and Mars, while additional echoes of figures from Raphael's Vatican Rooms once again connect the sculptor to central Italian artistic developments and the innovative achievements of the maniera moderna in sculpture.

=== Neapolitan Painting in the Sixteenth Century and the Emergence of the Maniera Moderna ===
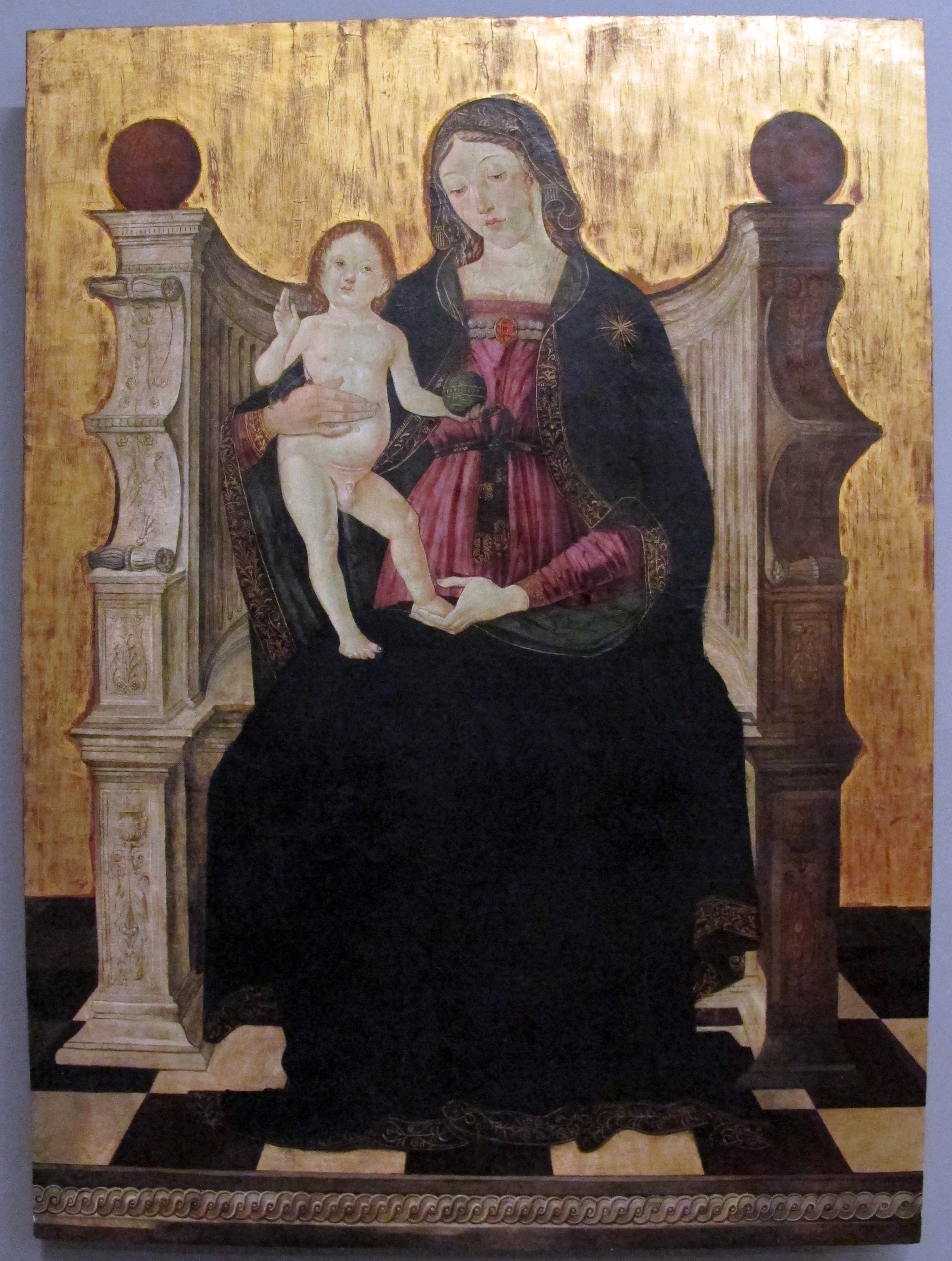
Cristoforo Faffeo, Madonna and Child, Neapolitan Gallery, Museo di Capodimonte.

Painting at the turn of the fifteenth and sixteenth centuries, unlike architecture and sculpture, which had already developed indigenous schools of considerable artistic significance, remained closely tied to foreign masters. Furthermore, the most distinctive feature of this art was its wider diffusion throughout the provinces of the kingdom, unlike architecture and sculpture, which, being regarded as nobler arts, were inevitably concentrated in the capital and its immediate surroundings. The Venetian-Lombard traditions represented by Cristoforo Scacco and Antonio Solario, as well as the Umbrian-Roman current associated with Antoniazzo Romano, continued to enjoy a vigorous phase before the advance of Raphael's artistic culture, in its various forms, including those strongly influenced by Iberian models, relegated them, still vital yet irreversibly outdated, to the peripheral areas of the kingdom.

The Umbrian-Roman tradition found its greatest following during the first two decades of the sixteenth century among local artists such as Cristoforo Faffeo, Francesco Cicino, Stefano Sparano, both from Caiazzo in Terra di Lavoro, Francesco da Tolentino, Giovanni Luce, and Alessandro Buono. Alongside local artists, important commissions also brought works by the two leading exponents of this artistic current, Perugino and Pinturicchio, both producing an Assumption of the Virgin. The former was commissioned by Cardinal Oliviero Carafa for Naples Cathedral, while the latter was commissioned by Paolo Tolosa, a wealthy Catalan merchant, for the Tolosa Chapel in Sant'Anna dei Lombardi.

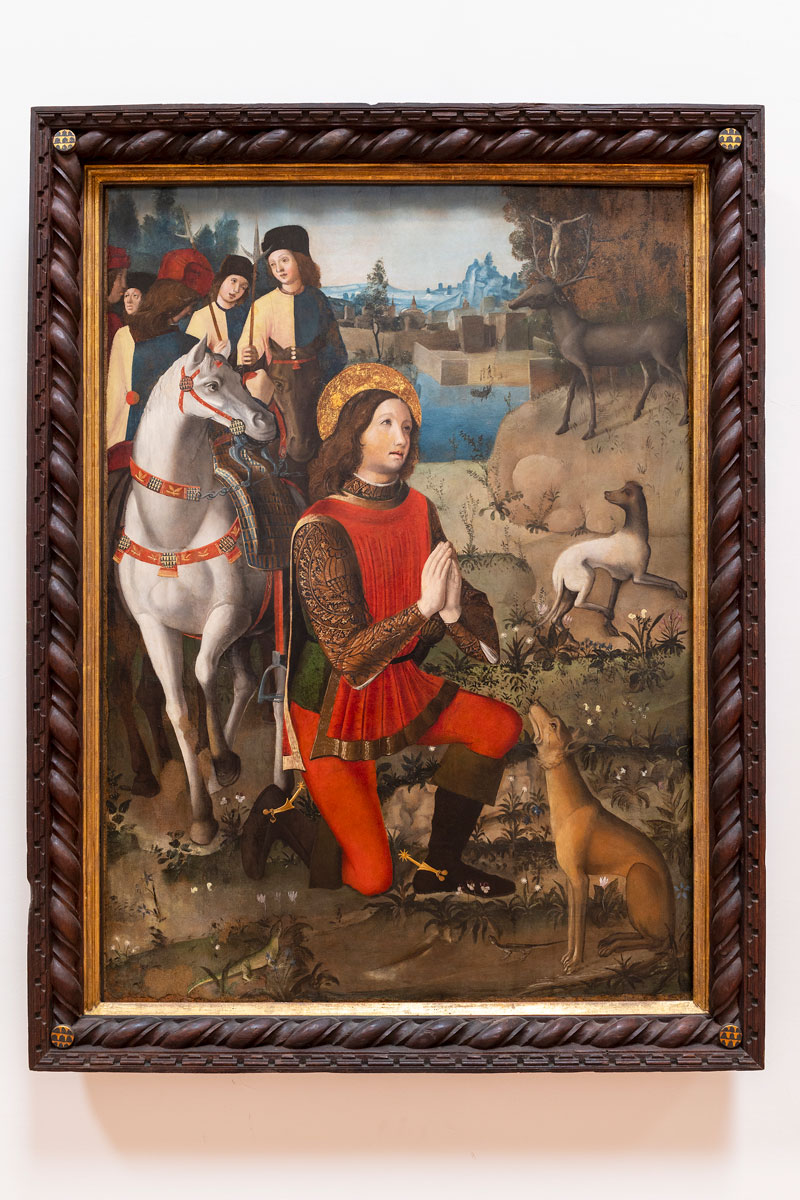
Pietro Buono, Vision of Saint Eustace, Certosa di San Martino.

Faffeo was the most accomplished interpreter of Antoniazzo's work. His style nevertheless remained personal and synthetic, capable of incorporating Iberian elements introduced by painters such as Francesco Pagano and Paolo da San Leocadio. Francesco Cicino of Caiazzo, likewise a disseminator of Antoniazzo's artistic language, produced works that departed from Faffeo's approach in favour of a more classically oriented composition. Stefano Sparano, who archival records indicate was already an established painter, received prestigious commissions such as the polyptych for the Sersale Chapel in the Sorrento Cathedral, dated 1509 and subsequently lost. Securely attributed works by the master from Caiazzo include the Diptych with Saint Augustine and Saint John the Evangelist in the Church of San Michele Arcangelo in Padula, originally made for the Church of Saint Augustine, and the Madonna and Child with Saints Francis and John the Baptist for the Church of Saint Anthony in Portici.

The early training of Francesco da Tolentino before his move to the Kingdom of Naples remains unknown, although it may be associated with the Peruginesque style that was also widespread in the Marche. The career of the painter from the Marche is highly representative of the dynamics, alternatives, and employment opportunities that characterized the production of many Central Italian artists who were only marginally affected by the rise of Raphael's maniera moderna. His activity was initially centred in Naples, before gradually moving inland to Nola, Liveri, and Palma Campania, and later into Lucania and Apulia, where works dating from the 1530s survive at Serracapriola. His artistic production followed a stylistic path marked by consistency and little inclination toward innovation, becoming increasingly stereotyped over time, with inevitable fluctuations according to the importance of individual commissions. Giovanni Luce of Eboli, from the Salerno area, likewise contributed to the diffusion of the Umbrian-Marche artistic language, primarily within the Principato of Salerno and Lucania. His most significant documented work, now lost, was the fresco decoration of rooms in the Sanseverino Palace in Naples.

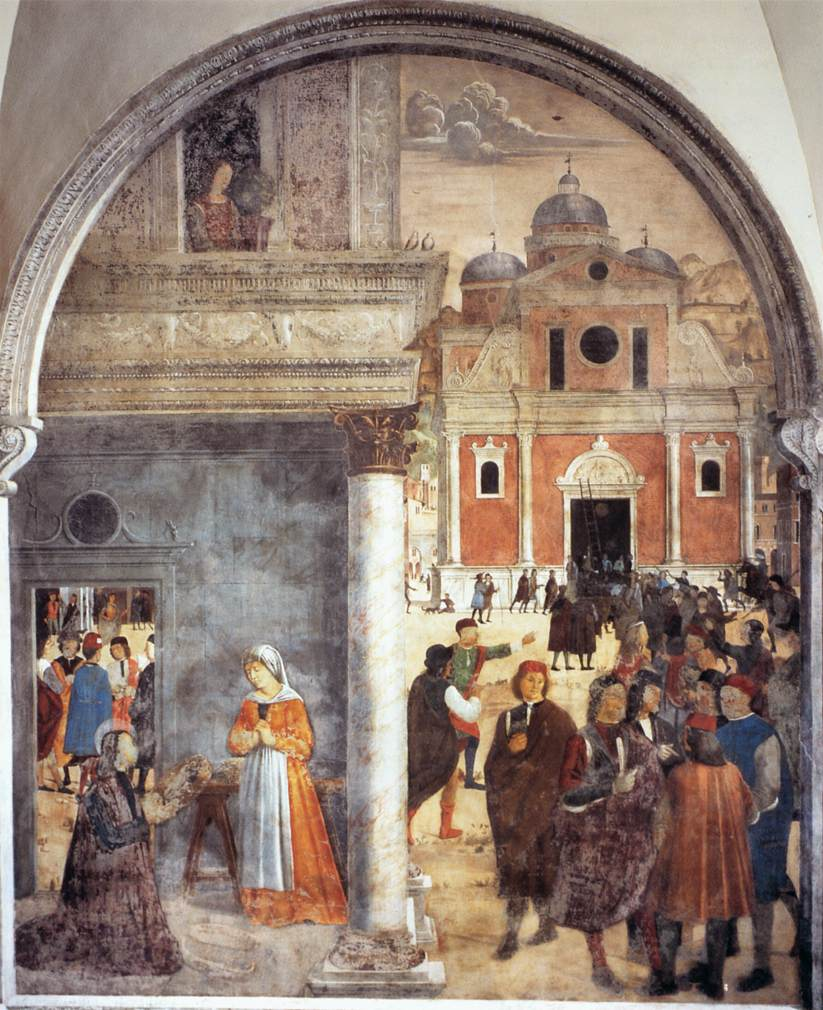
Antonio Solario, known as Lo Zingaro, Stories from the Life of Saint Benedict, Chiostro del Platano

The most interesting painter of this circle was undoubtedly Alessandro Buono, son of the painter Pietro Buono. His ability to synthesize, at the close of the fifteenth century, his father's artistic culture, characterized by Iberian influences, was now combined with inspirations drawn from Cristoforo Scacco, Pinturicchio, and the early works of Raphael. Around 1510, Antonio Rimpatta, another artist of Central Italian origin, executed the altarpiece Madonna and Saints for the Basilica of San Pietro ad Aram.

The most significant and representative exponent of the Lombard-Venetian school was Lo Zingaro. The most important work he left in Naples is the fresco cycle of the Stories of the Life of Saint Benedict in the Chiostro del Platano, today part of the State Archives of Naples. The dating of the work is based on hypotheses unsupported by documentary evidence, since information about the painter after his stay in the Marche between 1502 and 1506 is almost entirely lacking. The influences of that period are evident in the human figures, which, according to Fausto Nicolini, reveal clear references to Perugino and Pinturicchio, while his Venetian origins emerge in the treatment of landscapes and architectural scenes reminiscent of the work of Mauro Codussi in Venice. The artistic language acquired in the Marche can also be identified in minor works scattered throughout the kingdom, such as a Madonna and Child with Donor preserved in Naples, a Saint Francis of Assisi housed in the Museo Campano in Capua, and a Madonna and Child with Saints in Atri, in the Province of Teramo.

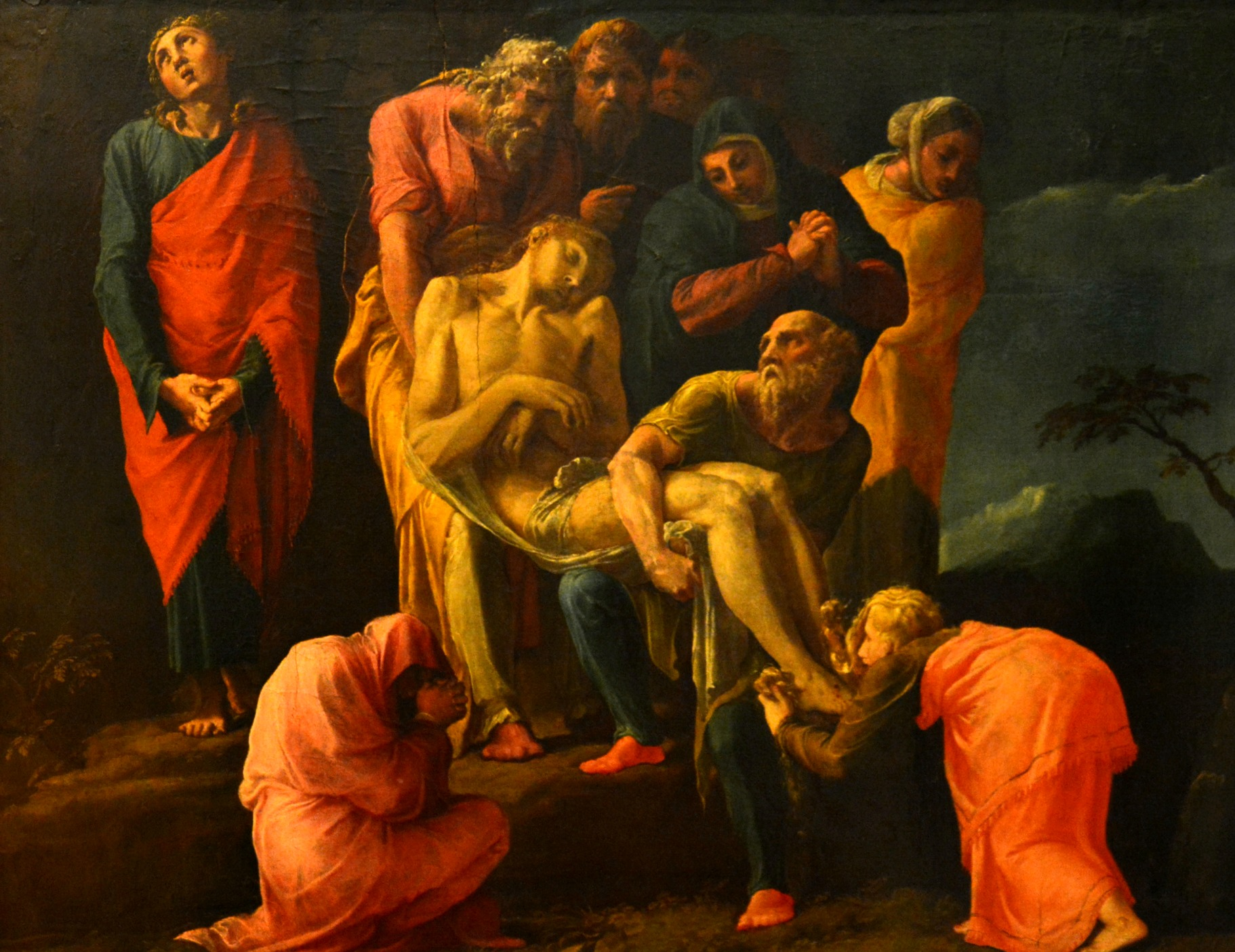
Polidoro da Caravaggio, Transport of Christ to the Sepulchre, Museo di Capodimonte, dated 1524–1527

Meanwhile, room was made for the arrival of artists more closely aligned with the Roman artistic current, which had begun to spread from the final decade of the fifteenth century. The stay of Polidoro da Caravaggio was particularly significant in introducing Raphael's and Michelangelo's artistic language to the city's noble courts during the third decade of the sixteenth century. His subjects, in keeping with classical Renaissance tradition, were drawn from Roman mythology. Polidoro was also a prolific painter of sacred themes. In his religious works, a more naturalistic conception of painting emerges, perhaps approaching that of Giorgione and the Venetian school of Tonalism, as is clearly evident in the Transport of Christ to the Sepulchre, executed during his second Neapolitan stay between 1524 and 1527.

As already noted, another factor in introducing the taste for the maniera moderna was the arrival of Raphael's altarpiece in San Domenico Maggiore. The innovations introduced by the master from Urbino were considerable and stimulated debate among younger local artists, who gave rise to the Mannerist painting of sixteenth-century Naples.

== Conclusions ==
The sixteenth century marked the peak of the classical culture that had begun in the first decades of the previous century, while at the same time signalling the decline of the cultural harmony that had emerged after the Treaty of Lodi. The first signs of this downturn were linked to the Italian Wars, as the descent of the French monarchs into the peninsula, and in particular their claims to the former Angevin Kingdom of Naples, became a major source of political and cultural instability throughout Italy.

The reconquest of the Kingdom of Naples in 1503 by the Crown of Spain dealt a decisive blow to the autonomy of Naples and its territories, which became possessions of Ferdinand the Catholic, alongside the recently discovered Americas, and subsequently of the Habsburgs Spain under Charles V. The system of government imposed through royal appointment abruptly diminished the autonomy of the noble families, which, through successive viceregal edicts, were compelled to relocate en masse to the viceregal capital. The purpose was to keep them under the supervision of central authority and to prevent conspiracies such as the Conspiracy of the Barons, which had originated in fiefs far removed from Naples. The consequences of this large-scale urban migration also included a decline in building quality, as structures were erected hastily, filling the remaining garden spaces of the great aristocratic palaces built between the late fifteenth century and the first two decades of the sixteenth. Architecture in general underwent a stylistic impoverishment, considerably simplifying the Albertian and Bramantean language that had been assimilated at the beginning of the century. Significant secular buildings became less numerous, while the architects of this period increasingly emerged from established families of master builders, far removed from the elevated ideal of the intellectual artist that had taken shape during the fifteenth century. Among the few architects who could claim a humanist education were Giovanni Francesco di Palma and Pirro Ligorio, both descendants of noble families of the kingdom. The former trained under Giovan Francesco Mormando, continuing the Cosentine master's style in a more restrained and simplified form, while the latter entered the service of the papal court in Rome, contributing to one of the most significant achievements of Mannerist architecture, Villa d'Este.

On the religious front, the Protestant Reformation and the Counter-Reformation led to the gradual strengthening of the Catholic Church, which initiated a slow yet powerful building programme, multiplying the construction of new religious complexes by the religious orders that began to spread from the middle of the century onward. The establishment of these new complexes drastically reduced the availability of building land, encouraging forms of construction that were technically illegal under contemporary regulations, particularly near the Aragonese defensive systems. In an effort to address the problem, the viceroy Don Pedro of Toledo undertook the most significant urban planning intervention since the Addizione Erculea of Ferrara, creating from scratch, to the west of the city, the first nucleus of the Quartieri Spagnoli (Spanish Quarters).

In sculpture and painting, the first schools of local artists trained in the workshops of Giovanni da Nola, Marco Cardisco, Andrea Sabatini, and Criscuolo began to emerge. By the middle of the sixteenth century, painting increasingly engaged with the work of northern European artists who undertook systematic journeys to study and update themselves on the developments of the maniera moderna, which had found little continuation in the countries beyond the Alps after the Lutheran Reformation, whose doctrines also condemned the artistic excesses associated with Michelangelo and Raphael. This new wave of Flemish artists, following the earlier influx of the mid-fifteenth century associated with the North–South conjunction, provided an opportunity to develop pictorial models alternative to the Roman and Tuscan Mannerism already present in the city. In sculpture, by contrast, the principal models derived from the workshop of Giovanni da Nola, particularly through his pupils Annibale Caccavello and Domenico Auria, who in turn became masters of the first sculptors to pave the way for the emergence of the Neapolitan Baroque. Local painters and sculptors also had to contend with a new influx of Italian artists arriving from other regions, attracted by the intense programme of construction and decoration associated with the new religious foundations and by the state commissions promoted by the viceroys for their own prestige.

Although more restrained than the humanist and Renaissance fervour that had preceded it, the Mannerist period became the setting for a vibrant cultural and artistic debate. Rather than reducing the viceregal kingdom to a mere artistic periphery, it laid the foundations for the following two centuries, during which Naples and its territories would eventually become, under the Bourbons, one of the leading European centres of the Enlightenment.

== Gallery ==
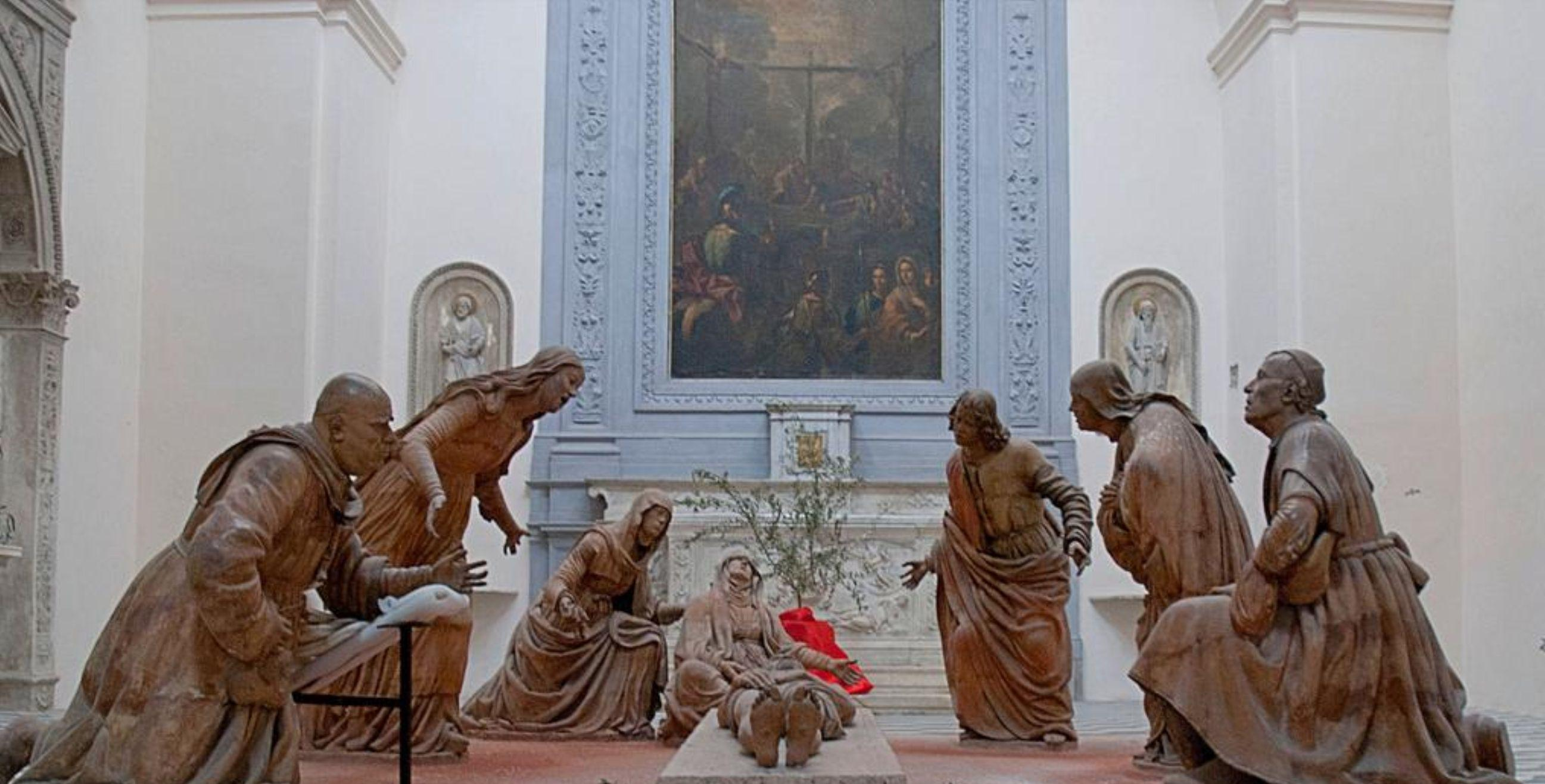
Lamentation over the Dead Christ, Sant'Anna dei Lombardi, Naples

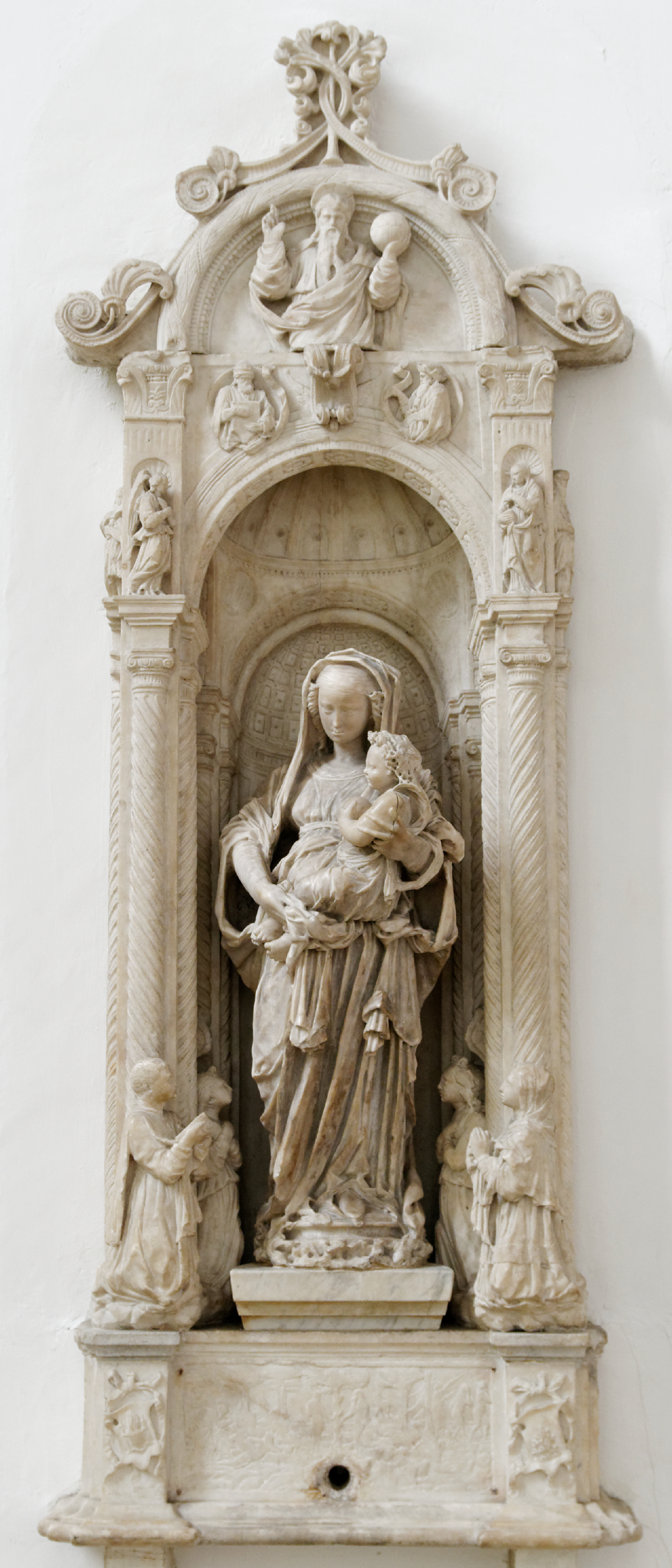
Domenico Gagini, Tabernacle with the Madonna and Child (Museo Civico di Castel Nuovo)

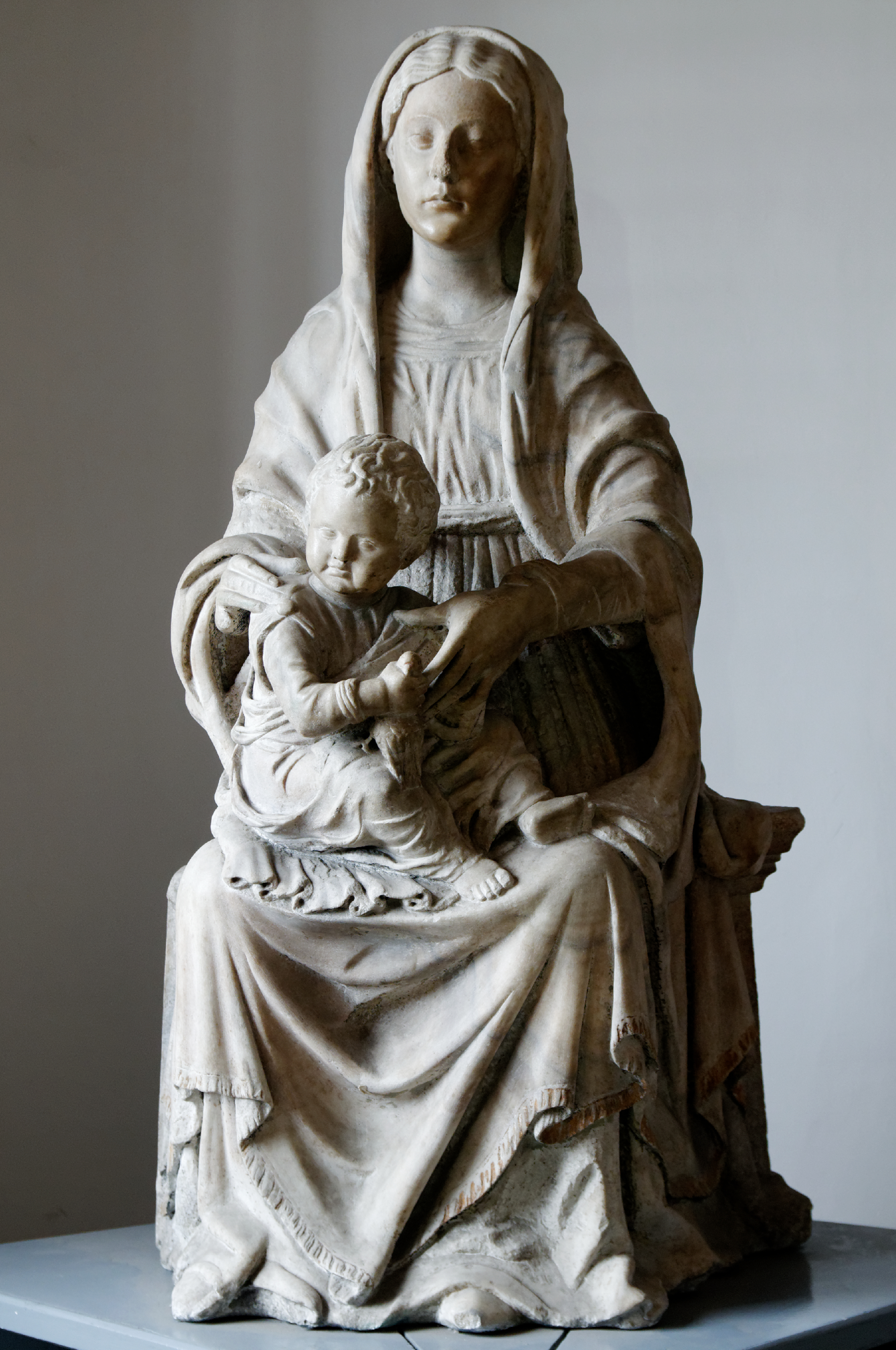
Francesco Laurana, Enthroned Madonna and Child, originally from the Sant'Agostino alla Zecca

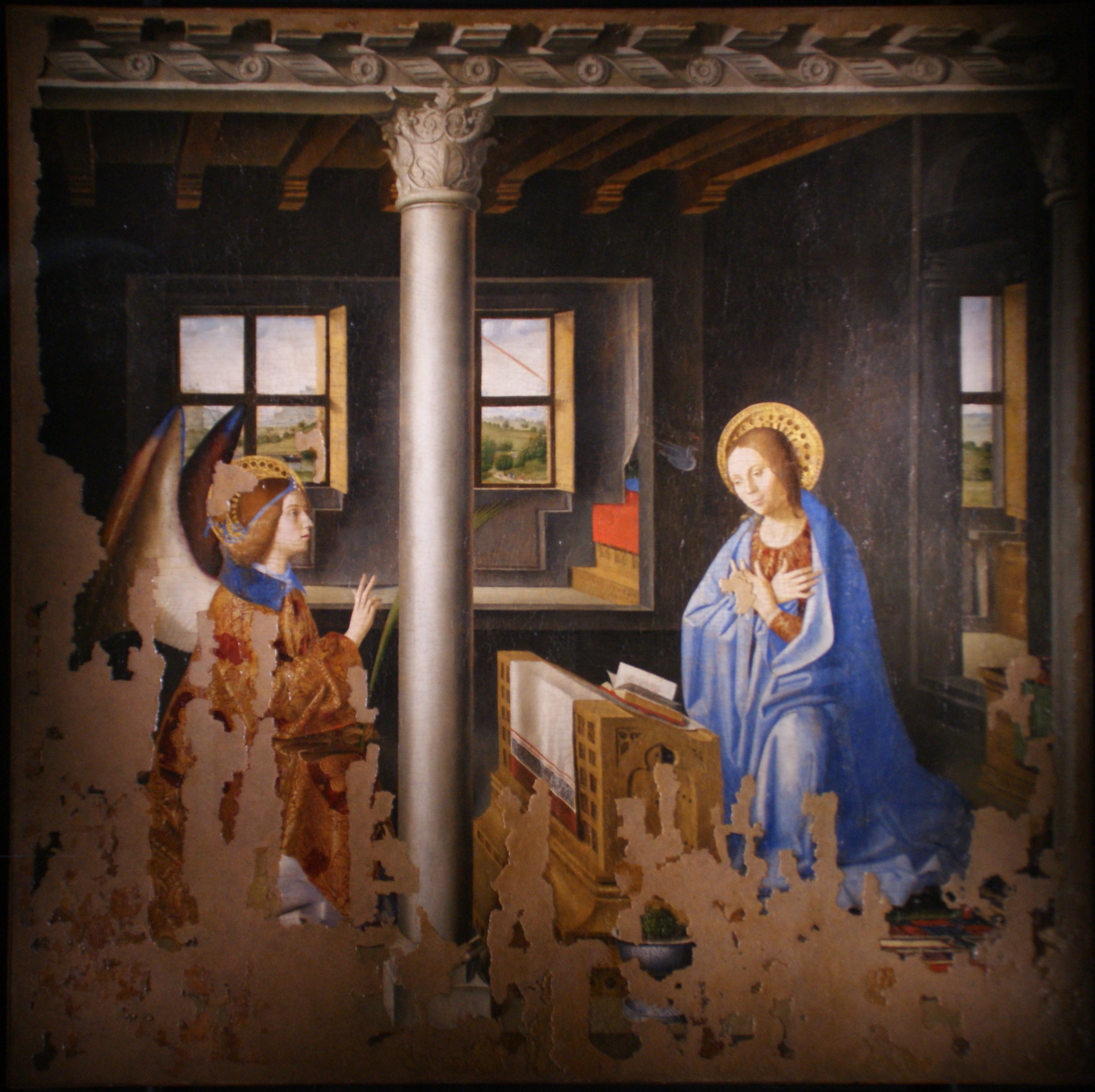
Antonello da Messina, The Annunciation

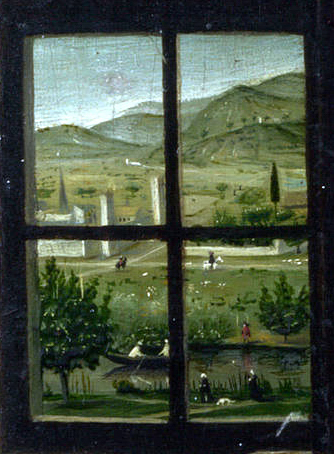
Antonello da Messina, detail of the Guelf window with landscape, Saint Jerome in His Study, 15th century

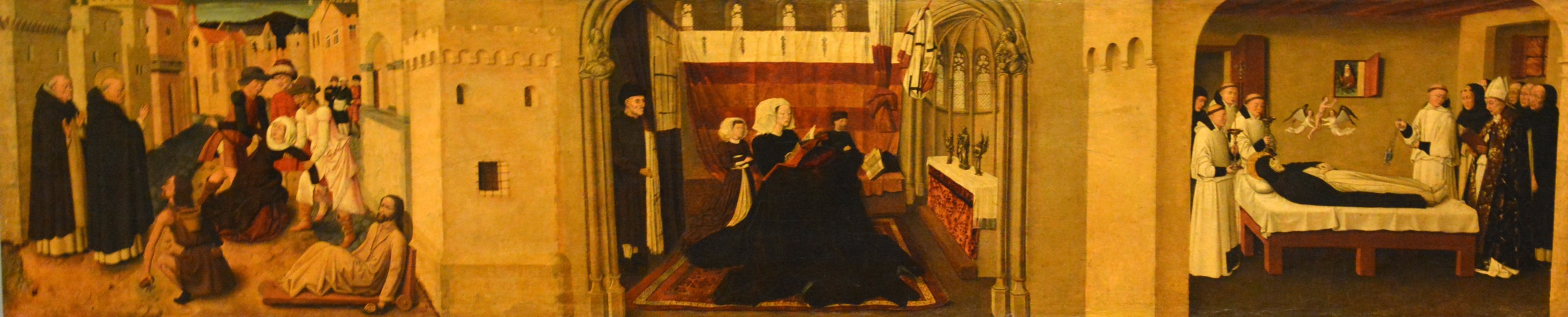
Saint Vincent Ferrer and His Stories, Colantonio, 15th century

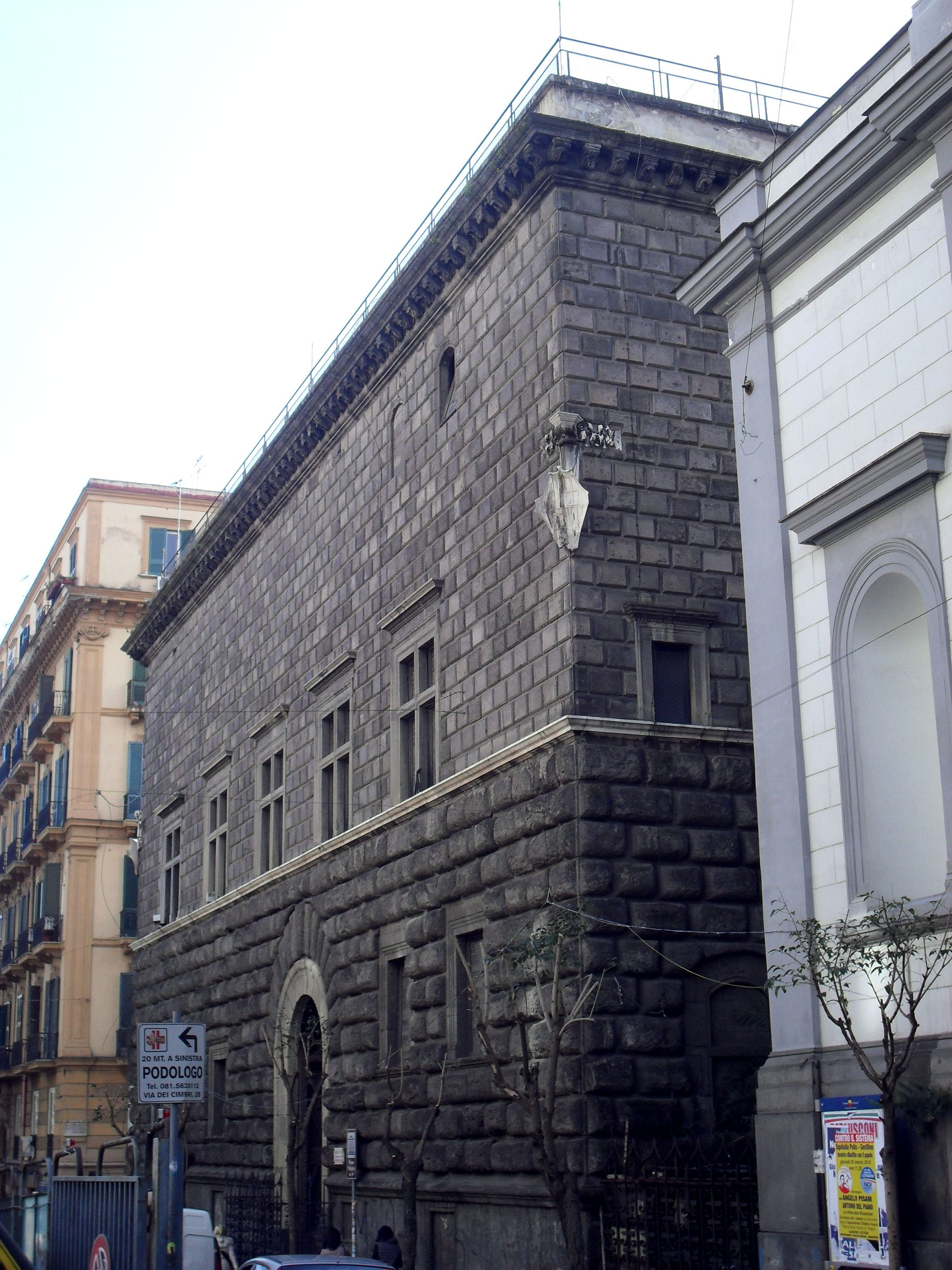
Palazzo Como

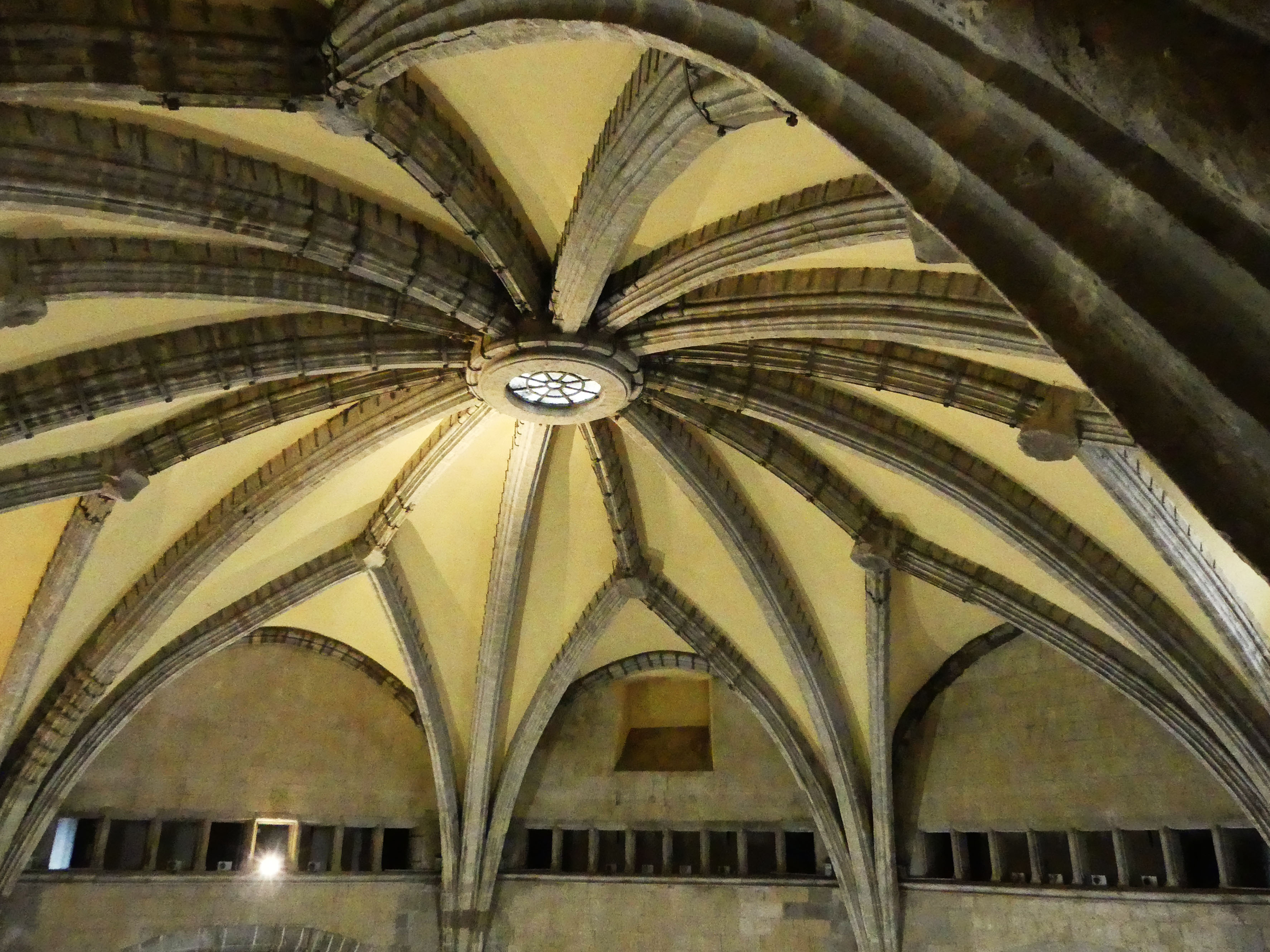
Hall of the Barons (mid-15th century), Castel Nuovo, Naples

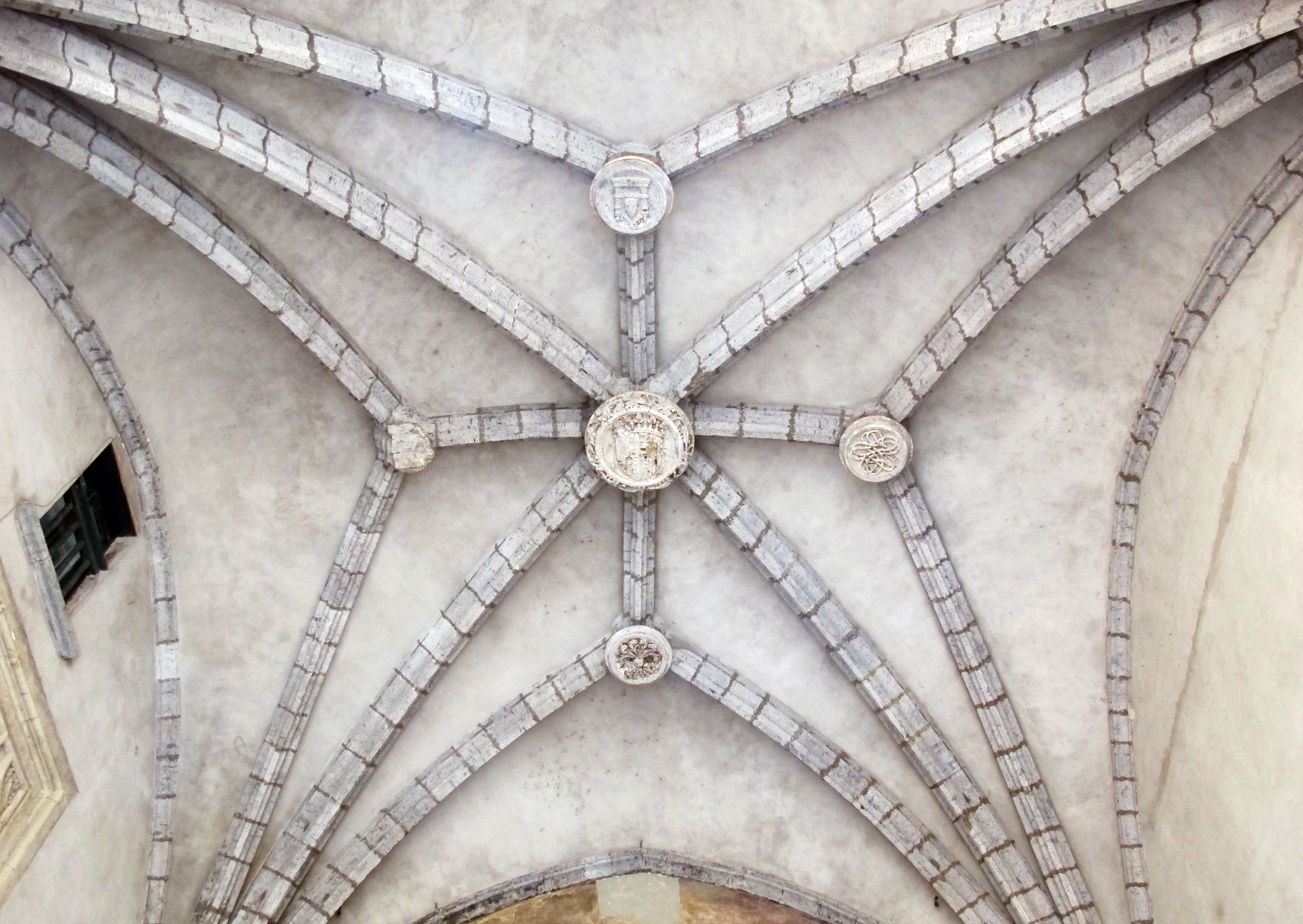
Entrance hall of Castel Nuovo, Naples, mid-15th century

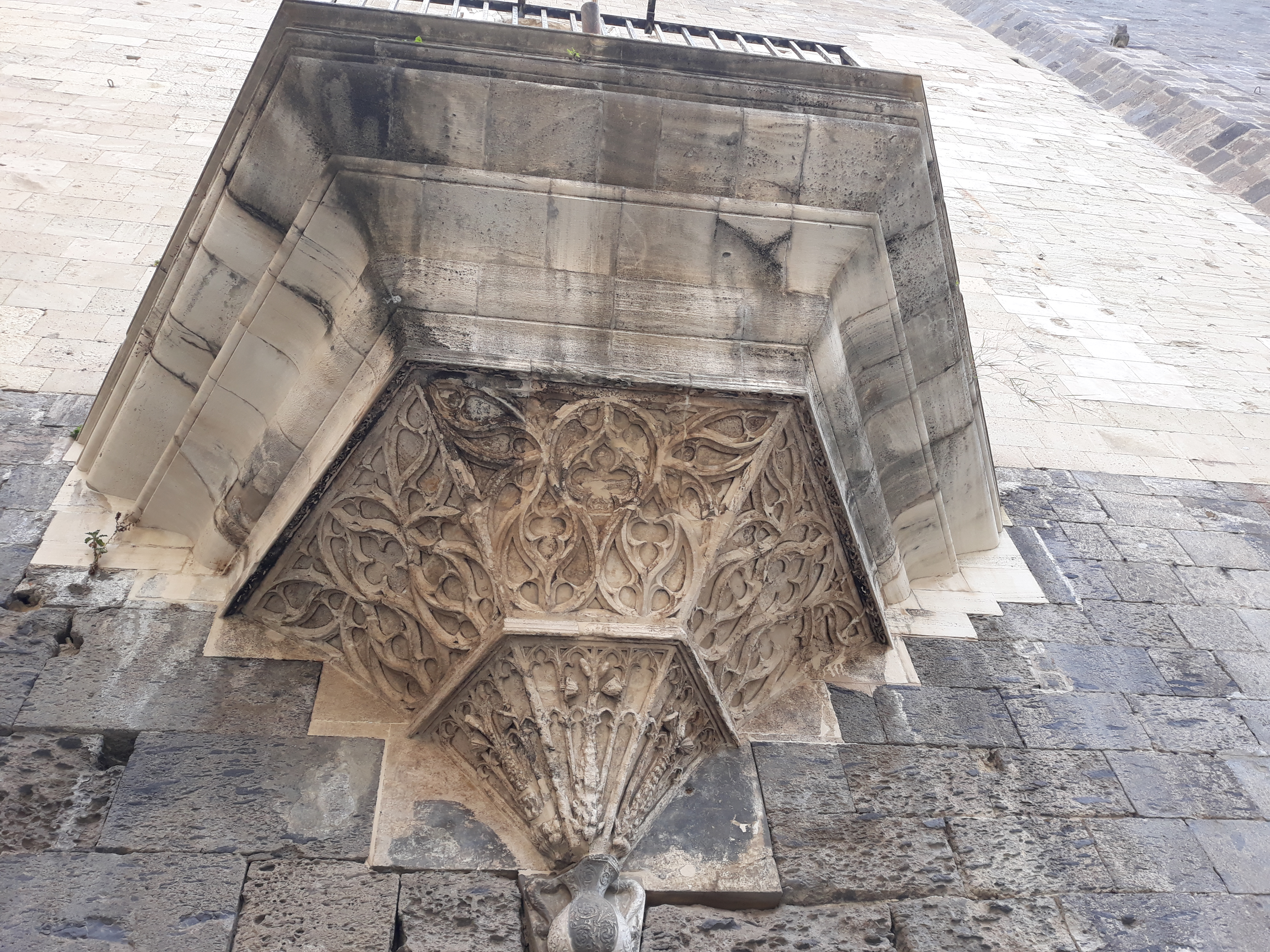
Naples, Castel Nuovo, decorations in International Gothic–Renaissance style (c. 1450–1460) beneath the balcony of King Ferdinand I

== See also ==
- History of Naples
- Renaissance humanism
- Italian Renaissance
