= Agnolo (given name) =

Agnolo is an Italian masculine given name, an ancient Tuscan form of Angelo. Angiolo is another Tuscan variant of the same given name.

Agnolo may refer to:

- Agnolo Aniello Fiore (15th century), Italian sculptor
- Agnolo di Baccio d'Agnolo (16th century), Italian architect
- Agnolo di Tura (14th century), Italian chronicler
- Agnolo Firenzuola (c. 1493–1545), Italian poet
- Agnolo Gaddi (c. 1350–1396), Italian painter
- Agnolo Pandolfini (1360–1446), Renaissance humanist
- Agnolo Poliziano (1454–1494), Italian poet

== See also ==
- Agnolo (disambiguation)
