= Andrea di Firenze =

Andrea di Firenze may refer to:

- Andrea da Firenze (died 1415), Florentine composer
- Andrea da Bonaiuto (active 1343–1377), Florentine painter
- Andrea di Giusto (active 1425–1450), Florentine painter
- Andrea Ciccione (1388–1455), Florentine architect
