= Giovanni da Gaeta =

15th-century Italian painter

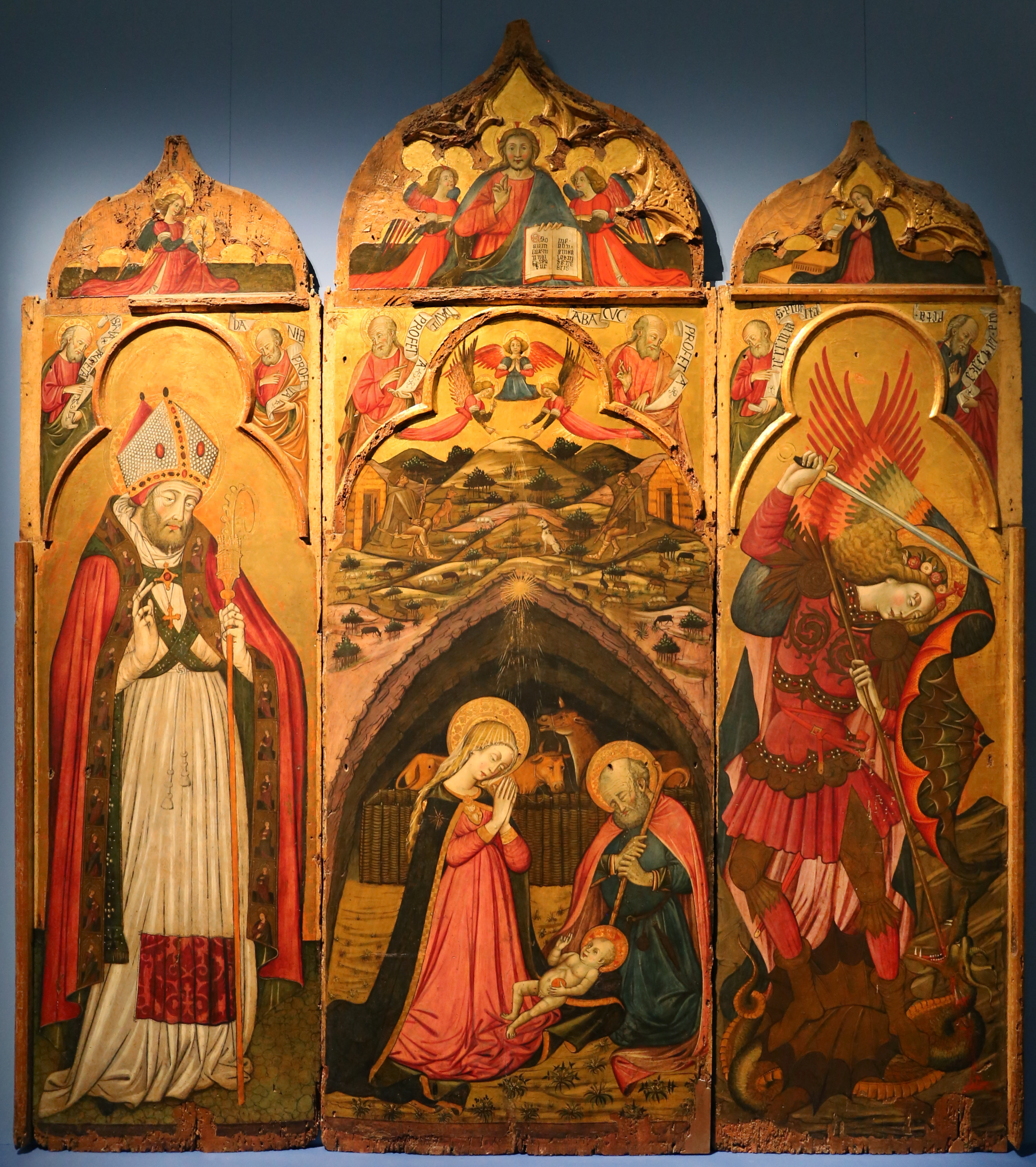
Nativity between Saint Mark and Saint Michael Archangel (1460-1470), tempera on panel, Fondi, Church of Santa Maria Assunta.

Giovanni da Gaeta (15th century) was an Italian painter active in the late-Gothic period in Campania and his native Gaeta. Little details are known about his life. An altarpiece of the Assunzione found in San Giovanni a Carbonara in Naples is attributed to him. He may have been influenced by Leonardo da Besozzo or Pisanello, during their stays in Naples.
