= Perinetto da Benevento =

Italian painter

Perinetto da Benevento or Perrinetto di Maffeo da Benevento (active mid-15th century) was an Italian painter, active in Naples.

== Biography ==
Almost no biographical details are known about this painter who collaborated with Leonardo da Besozzo in frescoing the chapel of Sergianni Caracciolo in San Giovanni a Carbonara in Naples. He was active between 1450 and 1465.

== Works by Perinetto da Benevento ==
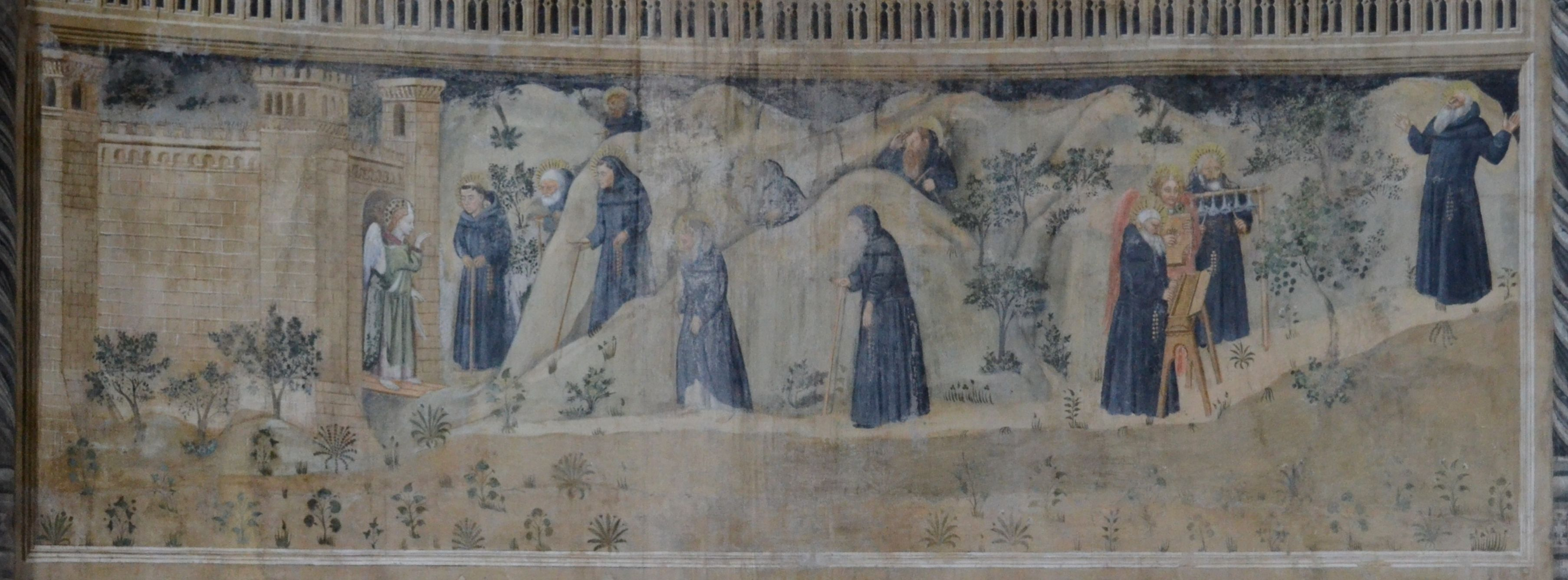
Storie eremitiche dei padri agostiniani (scene number 5) in the chapel of Sergianni Caracciolo in San Giovanni a Carbonara, Naples.

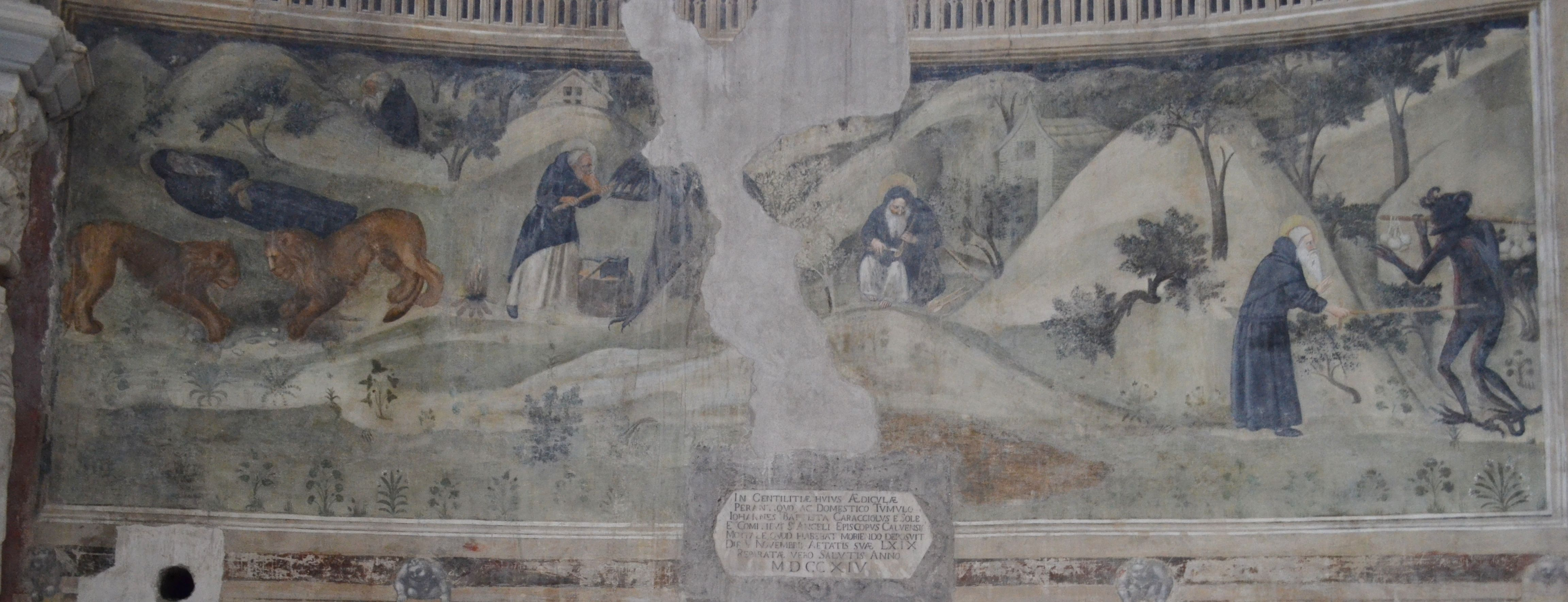
Scene number 4

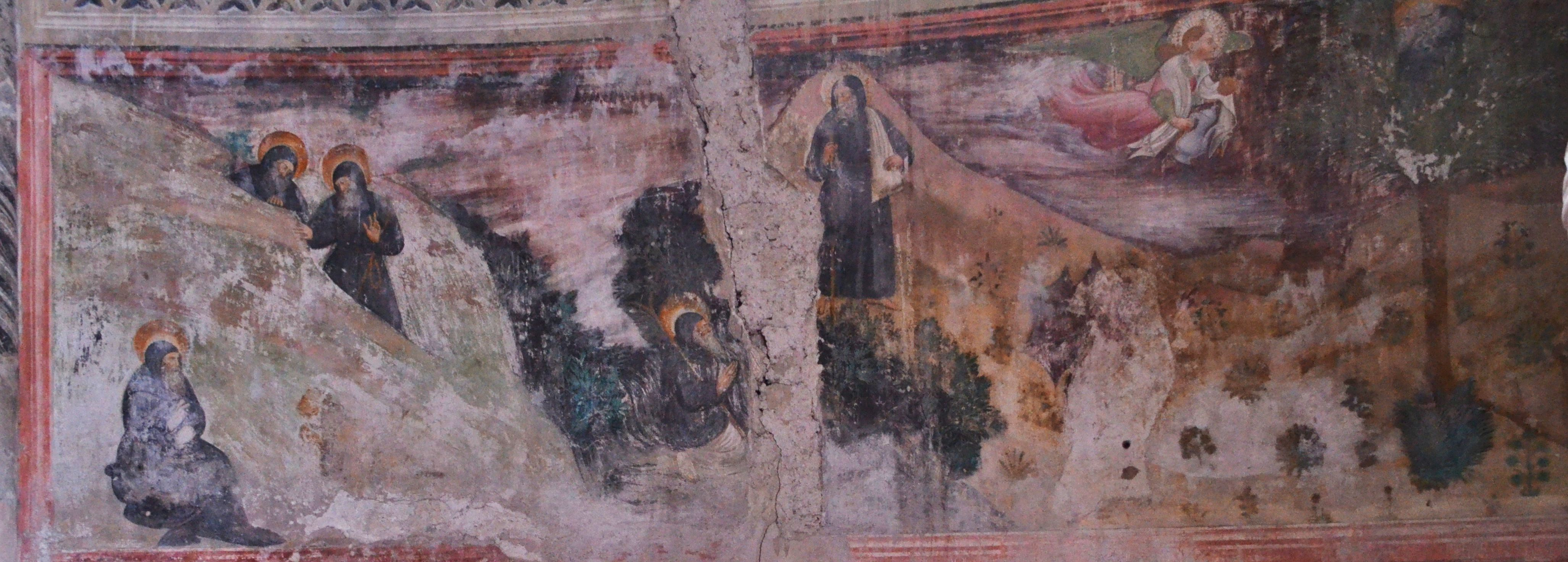
Scene number 3

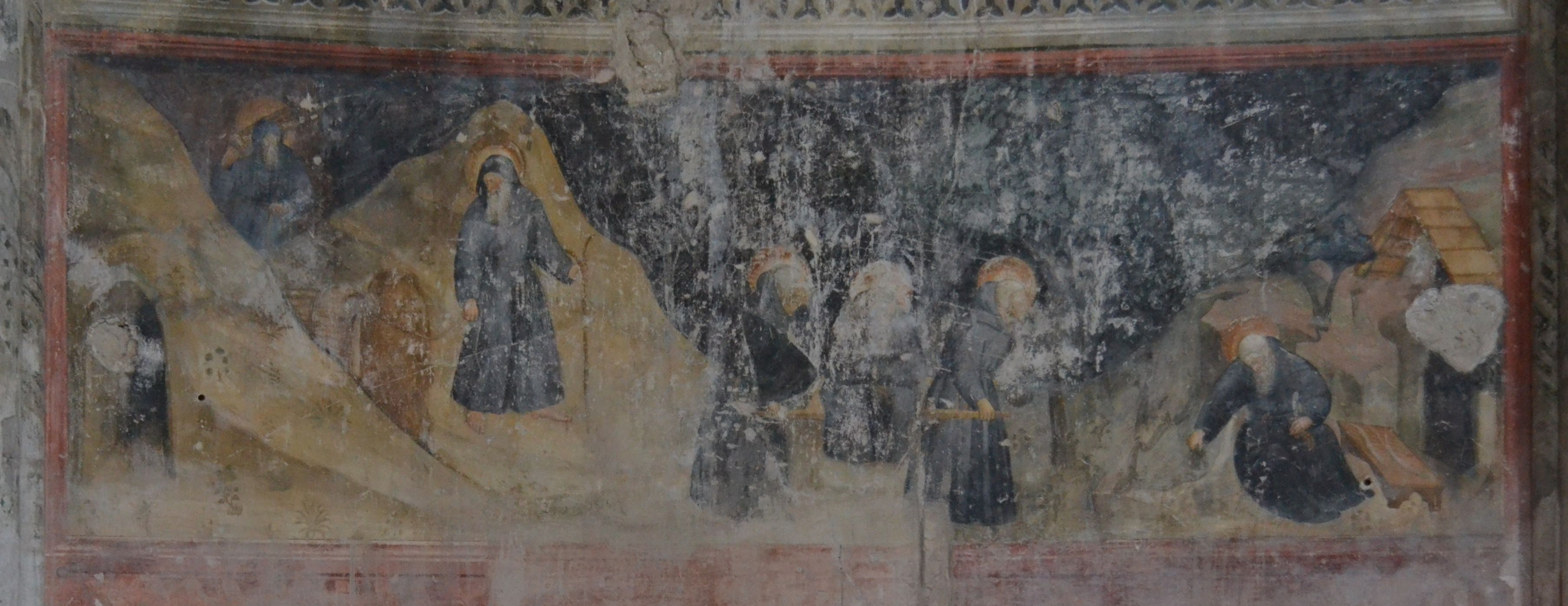
Scene number 2

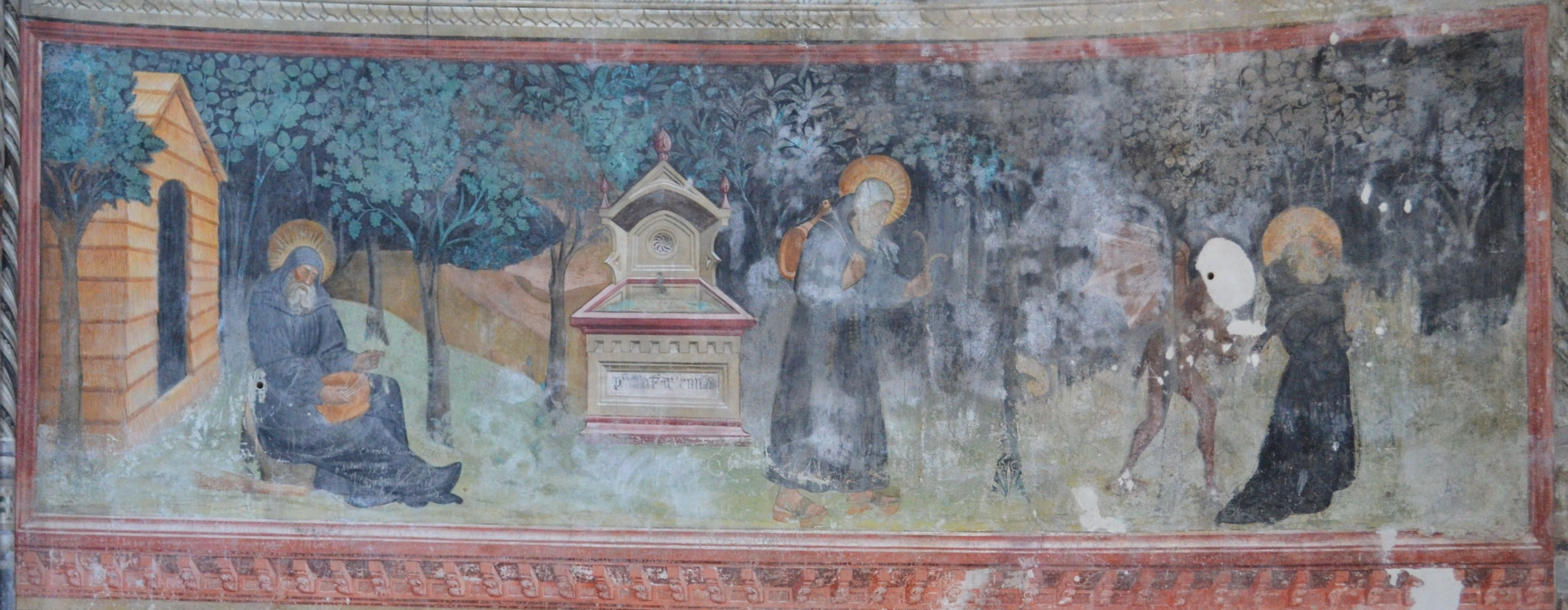
Scene number 1

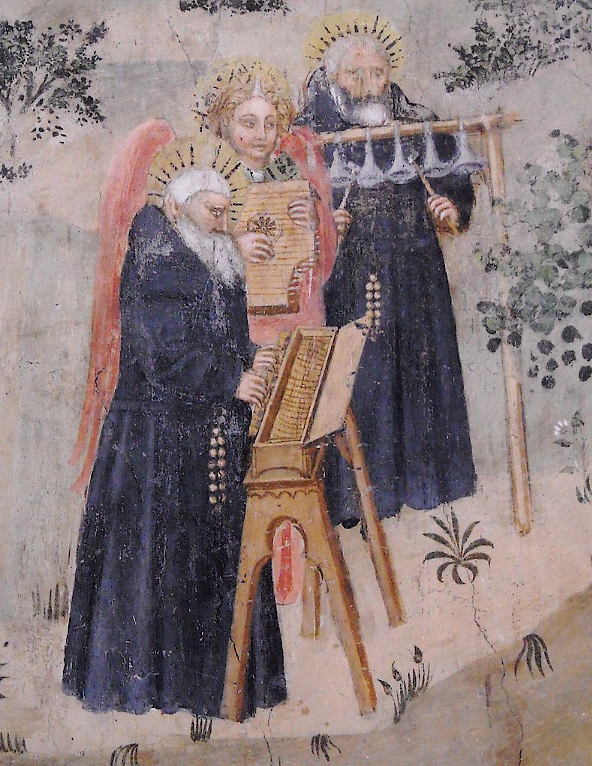
Detail from scene 5, holy people playing clavichord, psaltery and bells.
