= Agnolin =

Agnolin is an Italian surname. Notable people with the surname include:

- Luciano Agnolín (1915–1986), Argentine footballer
- Luigi Agnolin (1943–2018), Italian football referee

== See also ==
- Agnoli
