= Giovanni da Nola =

Italian sculptor and architect

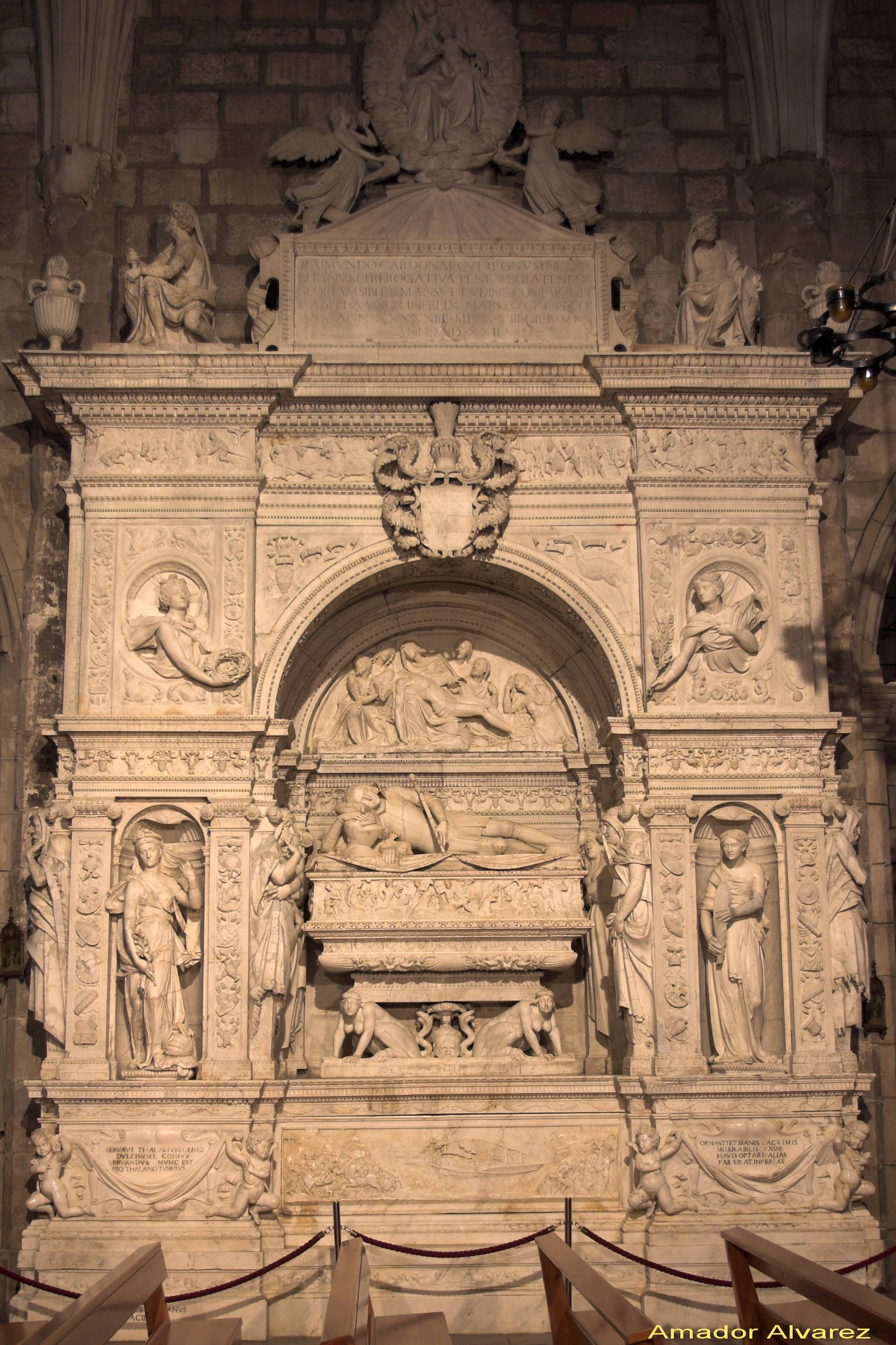
Tomb of Ramón de Cardona

Giovanni da Nola (1478–1559), also known as Giovanni Merliano, was an Italian sculptor and architect of the Renaissance, active in Naples.

He was born the son of a leather merchant, in Nola near Naples.

Da Nola moved to Naples where he trained under Aniello del Fiore and Benedetto da Maiano. In his youth, he traveled to Rome where he was influenced by Michelangelo, and then returned to Naples where he spent the rest of his career as sculptor and architect.

As an architect he built a number of palaces in Naples, including the Palazzo Giusso, now the home of the Naples Eastern University.

Many of the statues he created in Naples were removed to Spain by the viceroys then in charge of the Kingdom of Naples on behalf of the Spanish crown. When the viceroy Ramón de Cardona died in Naples in 1522, da Nola built his tomb in Naples, but it was then transported piece by piece to Bellpuig where da Cardona was buried. It remains one of the main examples of Italian renaissance art in Catalonia.

Most of his works that remain in Naples are in the churches of the city. They include:

- the tomb of Francesco Carafa in San Domenico Maggiore
- an altar in San Lorenzo Maggiore
- statues of saints in San Giovanni a Carbonara
- tombs of three youths of the Severino family in the church of Santi Severino e Sossio
- an altar in Sant'Anna dei Lombardi

Decorations da Nola made for the royal entry of Emperor Charles V in Naples (1535) are still to be seen on the Porta Capuana.

His pupils included a Nicola of Naples, Ferdinando Manlio, and Cola dell'Amatrice.
