= Club Atlético Temperley =

Argentine sports club

Temperley
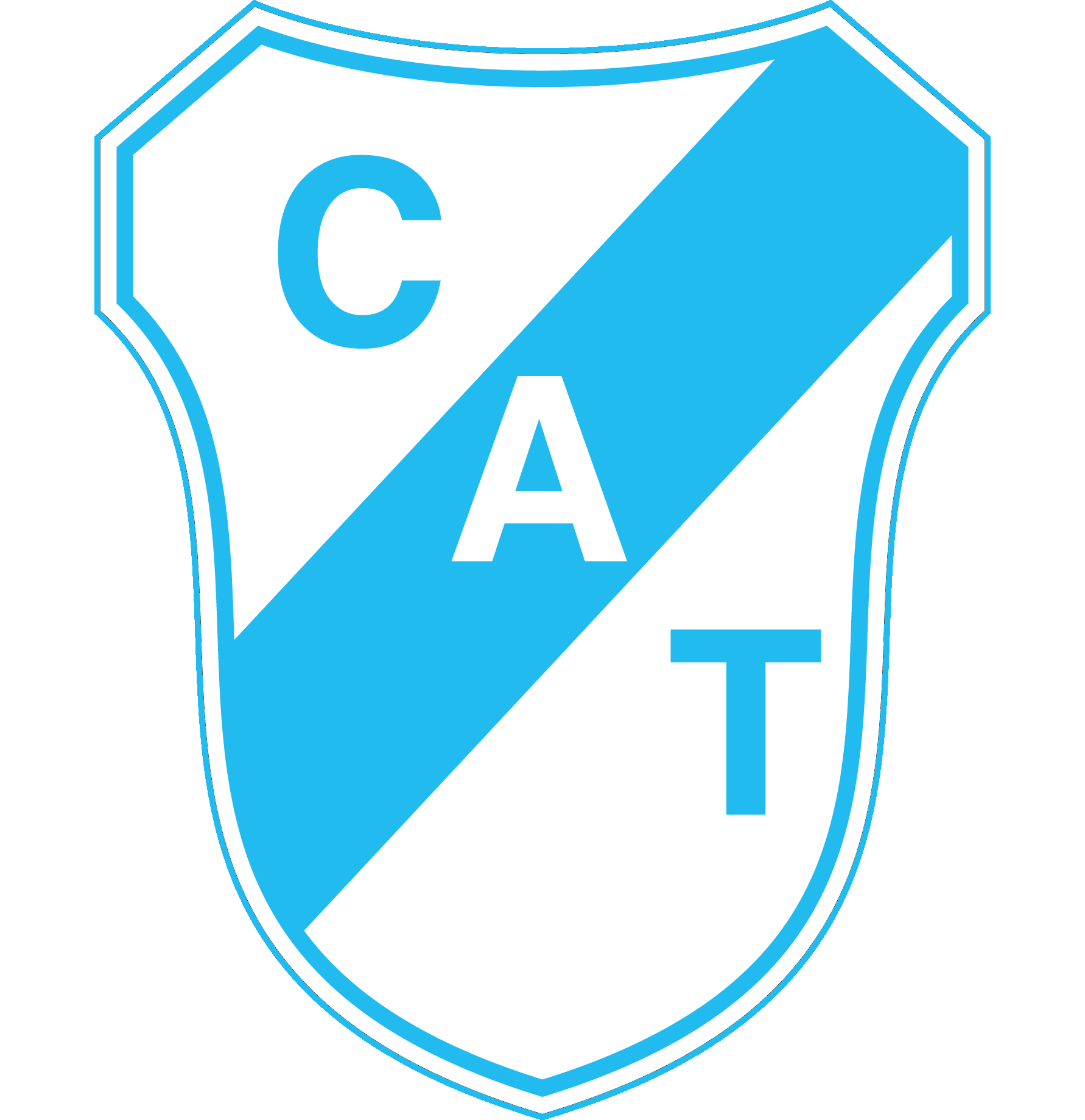
- Full name: Club Atlético Temperley
- Nicknames: Celeste; Gasolero; El Cele
- Founded: 1 November 1912; 113 years ago
- Ground: Estadio Alfredo Beranger; Turdera, Argentina
- Capacity: 18,000
- President: Alberto Lecchi
- Manager: Nicolás Domingo
- League: Primera Nacional
- 2025: Primera Nacional Zone B, 6th of 18
- Website: http://www.temperley.org.ar/
Home colours	Away colours	Third colours

Club Atlético Temperley is an Argentine sports club from the city of Temperley in Greater Buenos Aires. The club is mostly known for its football team, which currently plays in the Primera Nacional, the second division of the Argentine football league system.

Apart from football, Temperley hosts various sports, such as athletics, basque pelota, basketball, boxing, futsal, field hockey, judo, roller skating, swimming, taekwondo and tennis.

== History ==
=== Beginning ===
The predecessor of Temperley was the Club de Foot-ball Centenario established in 1910 to commemorate the 100th anniversary of the Revolución de Mayo. But the official establishment of the club was on 4 November 1912 during a meeting held at Club Arias. The first field of Centenario was in Villa Turdera, Buenos Aires. The first jersey was red with green collar.

In 1917 Temperley affiliated to the Argentine Football Association, the same year that the club decided to adopt the light-blue colors for the jersey, which would be Temperley's distinctive color to date. After being affiliated, the team started to play at the second division two years later. In 1921 the club changed its name to "Club Atlético Temperley" in 1921. That same year the institution also signed a contract to rent a land for $ 20 a month.

=== Amateur years and fusion ===
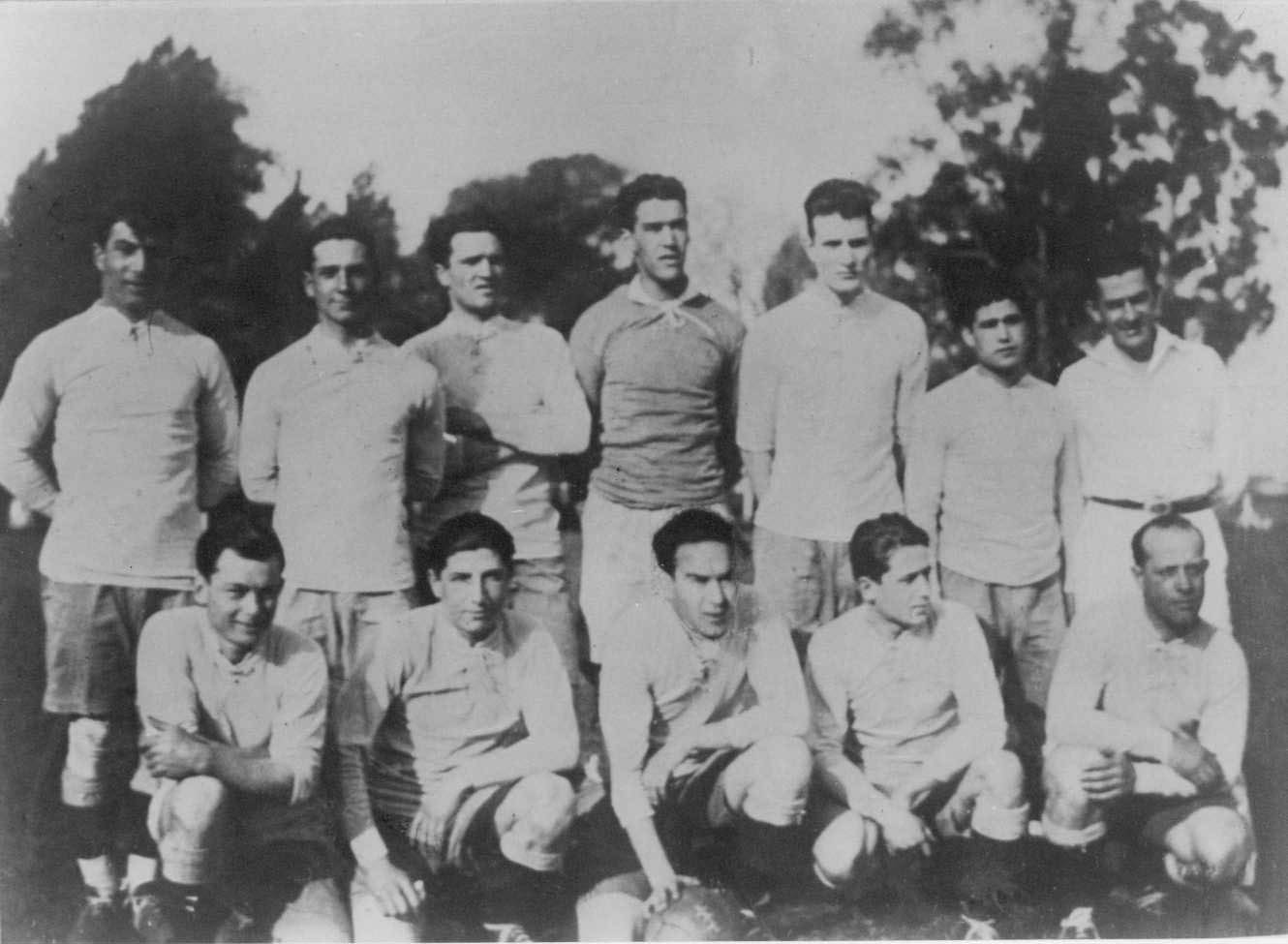
The squad that finished 2nd in 1924

In 1924 Temperley made a great campaign finishing 2nd to Boca Juniors. When the Liga Argentina de Football merged with Asociación Amateurs Argentina de Football, the club decided to disjoin the league. A soon time later Temperley requested to be affiliated again, the Association accepted but sending the club to play at the second division.

In 1932 Temperley merged with Argentino de Banfield. The new club, renamed as "Argentino de Temperley" played from 1932 to 1934 in the championships organized by amateur Asociacion Argentina de Football. When the amateur league merged with the professional league, Argentino changed its name to "Club Atlético Temperley" which has remained since then.

In 1946 the club inaugurated the concrete-built grandstands of its stadium and ten years later the new lighting on the field. This encouraged the organization of club's football matches at night, as well as the practise of other disciplines such as tennis and netball.

=== Return to Primera ===
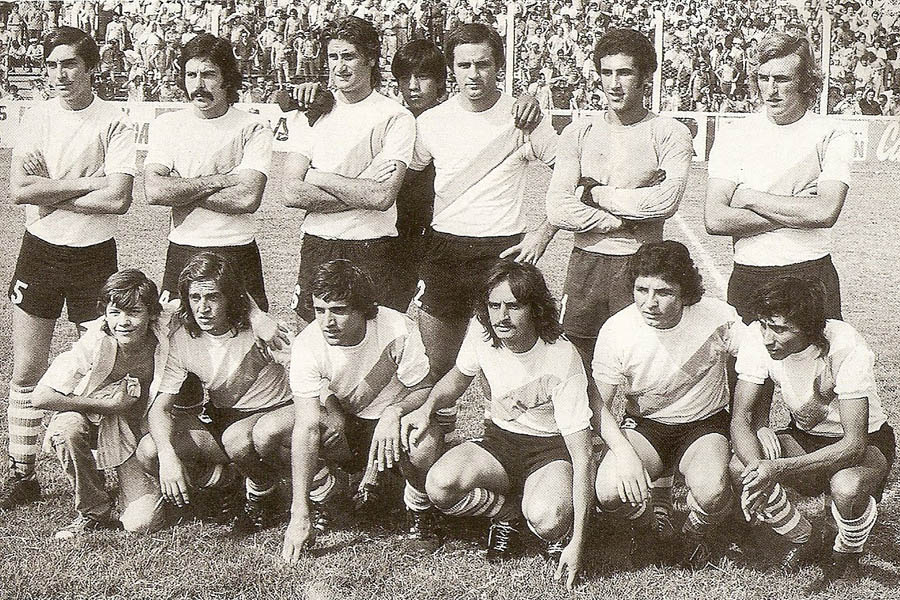
The 1974 team that won the first championship promoting to Primera División.

Temperley won its first title in the 1974 Primera B championship, therefore returning to Primera División. At the playoffs, Temperley defeated Estudiantes (BA) by 3–1 and drew Lanús and Unión by 1–1 scores, finishing first in the group with 3 points qualifying to play at the top division of Argentine football after 37 years. The team was coached by Jorge Ginarte who started his long-time career as coach of lower division teams.

The second promotion was in 1982. Temperley finished 2nd to champion San Lorenzo after playing a playoff which ended with the final games against Atlanta. Temperley won the first match 2–1 but lost at the hand of the Bohemios the second game by 1–0. The series had to be defined by penalty shot-out and Temperley won 13–12 therefore promoting to Primera División. Notable players of that team were Hugo Lacava Schell, Carlos Piris, Hugo Issa, and Dabrowski amongst others.

=== Relegation and bankruptcy ===
Temperley's stand on Primera did not last much time so the team was relegated to Primera B Nacional at the end of 1986–87 losing the playoff match to Platense by 2–0. Two years later the team was relegated again to the third division. Moreover, in 1991 the club went into bankruptcy after judge José María Durañona declared the club broken due to a debt that the club had with the Football Players Sindicate for an amount of US$400,000. The institution remained closed for two years until in 1993 Temperley was allowed to play in Primera C, in a match against Tristán Suárez.

=== Promotion and relegations ===
The next season Temperley promoted to Primera B Metropolitana defeating Tristán Suárez in the playoff matches (1–0 and 2–1). Mariano Biondi was the coach of that team. One year later (the 1995–96 season) Temperley won its two consecutive promotion to Primera B Nacional although the club did a poor campaign being relegated again at the end of the tournament. On 31 July 1999 Temperley won a new promotion to Nacional B, being coached by Héctor Ostúa.

=== Uniform evolution ===
1912–17	1917–present

Rare models

1930	1960 ^{1}	1964 ^{2}	1969–71 ^{3}	1974 ^{4}

Notes:

- ^{1} Worn in the second half of a match versus Deportivo Morón.
- ^{2} Worn during some matches in the season.
- ^{3} Worn during the 1971 Primera B season.
- ^{4} Worn during the 1974 Primera B season, when Temperley won its first title.

== Records ==
- Biggest wins

8-0 vs Estudiantes BA
10-2 vs Sportivo Dock Sud

- Biggest defeat

1-9 vs Nueva Chicago

- Most appearances

Oscar Aguilar – 292 games (1979–90)

- Top scorer

(Argentina) Luciano Agnolín – 130 goals (1939–42)

- Best goalkeeper

Alejandro Coronitti – 109 goals conceded in 111 games (0.98 per game)

== Players ==
=== Current squad ===
As of 26 March 2025

Note: Flags indicate national team as defined under FIFA eligibility rules; some limited exceptions apply. Players may hold more than one non-FIFA nationality.

No.	Pos.	Nation	Player
—	GK	ARG	Valentín Díaz
—	GK	ARG	Ezequiel Mastrolía
—	GK	ARG	Lisandro Morrone
—	DF	ARG	Valentín Aguiñagalde
—	DF	ARG	Matías Calzón
—	DF	ARG	Pablo Casarico
—	DF	ARG	Bruno Duarte
—	DF	ARG	Nahuel Genez
—	DF	ARG	Santiago Gutiérrez
—	DF	ARG	Agustín Lamosa
—	DF	ARG	Leandro Lucero
—	DF	ARG	Diego Magallanes
—	DF	ARG	Rodrigo Mazur
—	DF	ARG	Federico Milo
—	DF	ARG	Lorenzo Monti
—	DF	ARG	Iván Peralta
—	MF	ARG	Adrián Arregui
—	MF	ARG	Fernando Brandán

No.	Pos.	Nation	Player
—	MF	ARG	Julián Carrasco
—	MF	ARG	Thiago Coria
—	MF	ARG	Gabriel Esparza
—	MF	ARG	Juan Gabriel Frías
—	MF	ARG	Santiago Grecco
—	MF	ARG	Mathías Lugo
—	MF	ARG	Luciano Nieto
—	MF	ARG	Claudio Pombo
—	MF	ARG	Lucas Richarte
—	MF	ARG	Rodrigo Stocco
—	MF	ARG	Agustín Toledo
—	FW	ARG	Franco Ayunta
—	FW	ARG	Lucas Gaona
—	FW	ARG	Gabriel Hauche
—	FW	ARG	Luis López
—	FW	ARG	Mateo Romero
—	FW	ARG	Javier Toledo
—	FW	ARG	Lautaro Torres

== Notable players ==
- (Argentina) Carlos De Marta
- (Cape Verde) (Portugal) Adriano Tomás Custodio Mendes
- (Argentina) Pato Margetic

== Notable coaches ==
- (Argentina) Jorge Ginarte (1974)
- (Argentina) Ricardo Rezza (2014-2015)

== Honours ==
=== National ===
- Primera División B
  - Winners (1): 1974
- Primera C
  - Winners (1): 1994–95
