= San Giovanni a Mare, Gaeta =

Church in Gaeta, Italy

Coordinates: 41.2090°N 13.5884°E

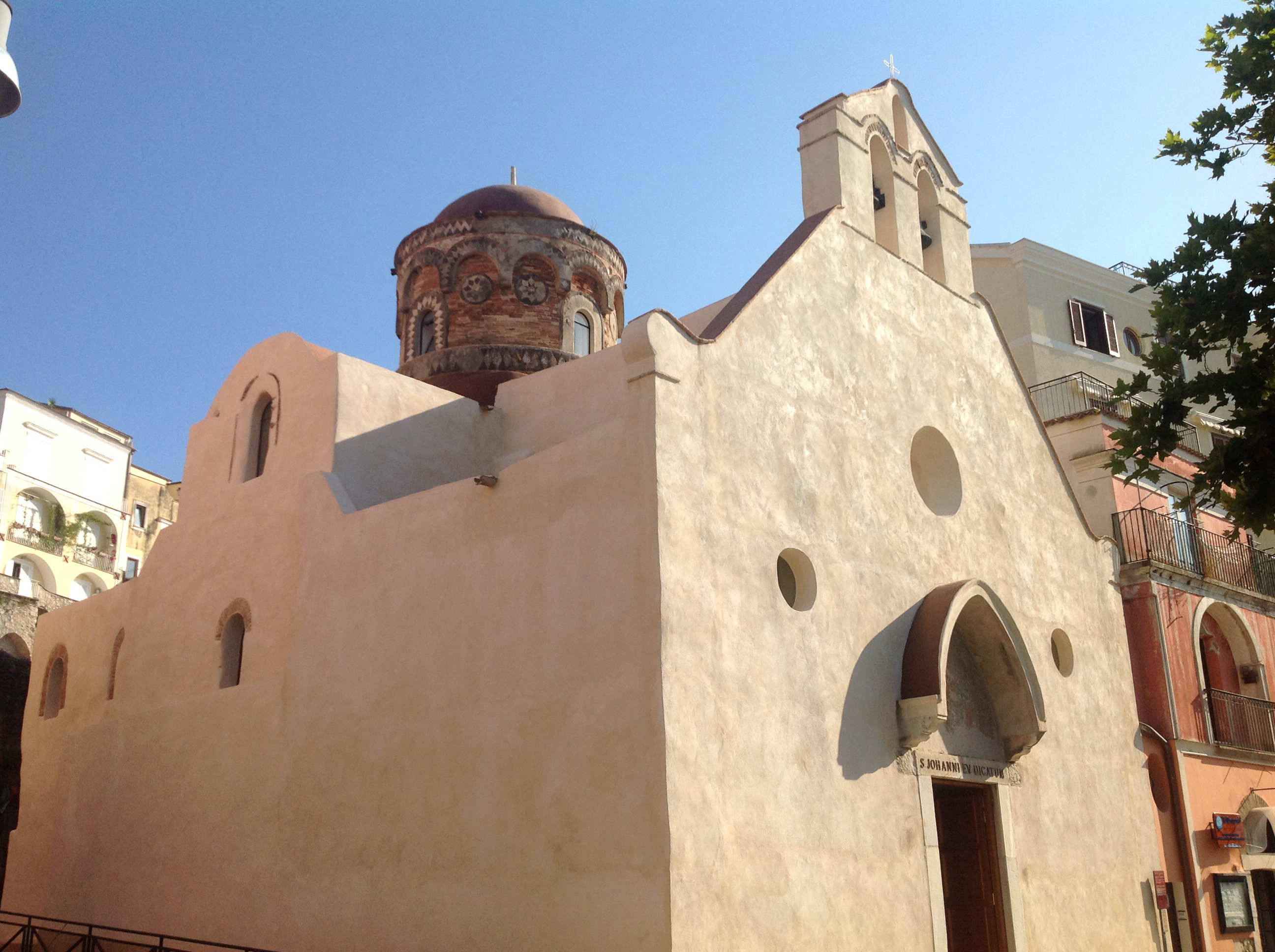
Gaeta, church of San Giovanni a Mare - Exterior

San Giovanni a Mare, which translates to St John at sea, is a 10th-century church located in Gaeta, region of Lazio, Italy. The church for many years was sponsored by the guild of carpenters, hence was also known as San Giuseppe. It belongs to the parish that includes the Cathedral of Saints Erasmus and Marcian and St. Mary of the Assumption.

== History ==
The church originally stood outside the city walls, and had a central dome decorated with external arabesque reliefs. the facade was added in the 18th century. The 1928 restoration brought to light 14th-century frescoes depicting the Visitation and St Agatha, Virgin and Child Enthroned with St. Lawrence attributed to Pietro Cavallini, now detached and exhibited in the Gaeta Diocesan Museum. Several altars, mostly in stucco, were erected during the Baroque era, each dedicated to their own saint, and placed along the walls. Until the 1960s, the church had a small Neapolitan organ in place. During the restoration of 1928, the main altar was moved to the church of Santa Maria della Catena and replaced by the top slab of a Roman sarcophagus with hippogriffs from the 400 AD.

The church suffered gravely during the second world war, but continued as a church and venue for concerts till 1975–1980, when it was closed for renovations. In 2015, it continues to require reconstruction, and is generally closed and deconsecrated.

== See also ==
- High medieval domes
