= Agnoletto =

Agnoletto is an Italian surname. Notable people with the surname include:

- Marcello Agnoletto (born 1932), Italian footballer
- Vittorio Agnoletto (born 1958), Italian doctor and politician

== See also ==
- Agnolo (disambiguation)
