= Sigismondo di Giovanni =

Italian architect

Sigismondo di Giovanni (died 1540) was an Italian architect in Naples, Italy, working in the Renaissance style.

It was him who designed the nobile Seggio di Nido (1507) and the cupola for the church of San Severino e Sossio. He was a pupil of Giovanni Francesco Mormando. In Seggio di Nido there are still Gothic influences remaining.

== Sources ==
- Sasso, Camillo Napoleone (1856). Storia de'monumenti di Napoli e degli architetti che gli edificavono: Dallo Stabilimento della Monarchia, sino al nostri Giorni, Volume 1. Largo Regina Coeli, Naples: Tipografia Federico Vitale. p. 224.
