= Antonio Solario =

Italian Renaissance painter

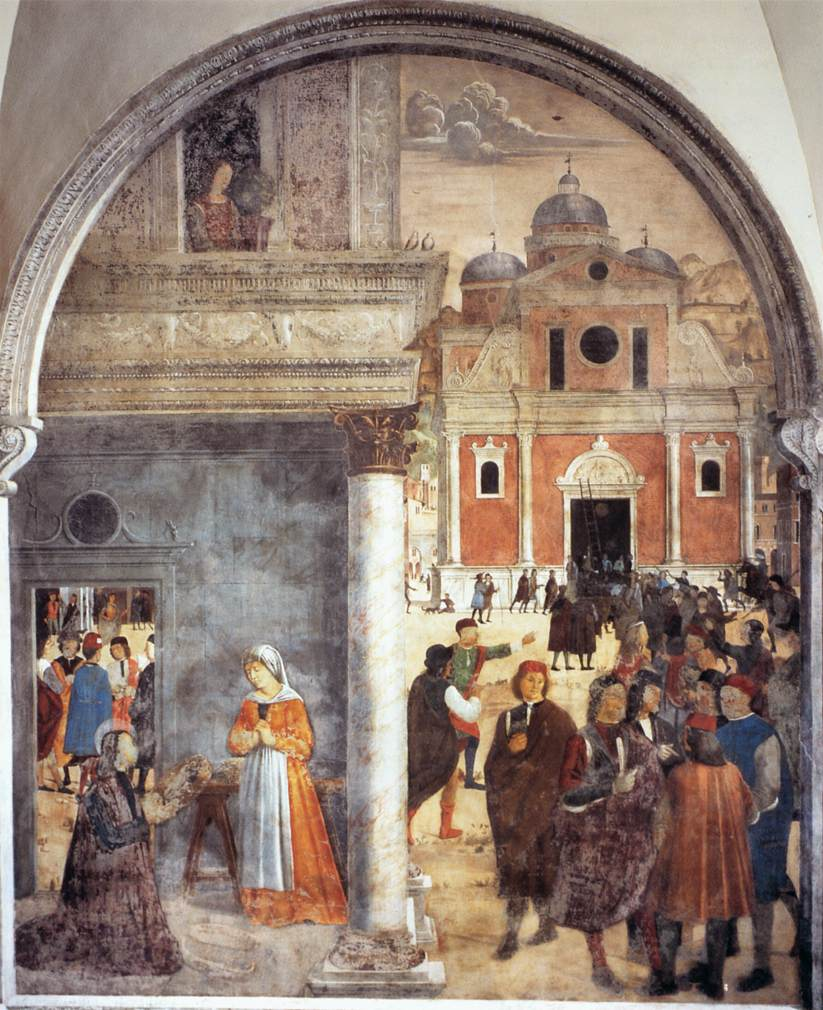
Scene from the Life of St Benedict, Naples

Antonio Solario (fl. 1502–1518), also known as Antonio de Solario or da Solario and sometimes by the nickname Lo Zingaro ("The Gypsy"), was an Italian painter of the Venetian school, who worked in Naples, the Marche and possibly England. His career is obscure, largely pieced together from surviving works, and at one time his existence was doubted.

== Biography ==
Solario was possibly born and probably trained in Venice. He is first recorded at Fermo in 1502, and last (rather questionably) in Montecassino in 1518; if this last is excluded his last known date is 1514. In Naples, his main work were twenty large frescoes illustrating the Life of St Benedict in the cloister of the monastery of Santi Severino e Sossio (now the State Archives), which are open to the elements, though covered, and are now greatly decayed; they present a vast variety of figures and details, with dexterous modeling and coloring. These were painted in the first years of the 16th century. Sometimes Solario's color is crude, and he generally shows weakness of draughtsmanship in hands and feet. His tendency is that of a naturalist: the heads life-like and individual, and the landscape backgrounds better invented and cared for than in any contemporary.

Solario signed the Withypool Altarpiece "Antonius Desolario, Venetus 1514"; this includes a donor portrait and the heraldry of the London merchant Paul Withypool. This work and other references to works in England by John Leland a few decades later are the evidence for his putative English visit. The altarpiece is in the Bristol City Museum and Art Gallery, which own the main panel; the wings have been loaned by the National Gallery, who also have a Virgin and Child. There is a similar but smaller panel of the Madonna and Child with a Donor in the National Museum of Capodimonte at Naples. All include charming small landscapes seen through windows in a wall behind the figures.

His works are sometimes confused with those of his contemporary Andrea Solario, a Milanese follower of Leonardo da Vinci. While not related to this painter, Antonio probably met and was influenced by Andrea. The portrait of Charles II d'Amboise in the Louvre, who now attribute it as a copy of a work by Andrea, is a case in point.

Unfortunately, the only biography of Solario written by a local personage was penned by Bernardo de' Dominici (1683–1759), the "Neapolitan Vasari", who wrote an often confused and error-ridden Vite dei Pittori, Scultori, ed Architetti Napolitani. It states that Solario was born in about 1382, probably in Abruzzo. He is called the son of a tinker, and, after a romantic interlude, became son-in-law of Niccolò Antonio Colantonio, the leading artist in mid-15th-century Naples. Dominici claims Solario died in 1455. The erroneous chronology was not clarified until the 20th century.
