= Giovanni Francesco Mormando =

Italian architect

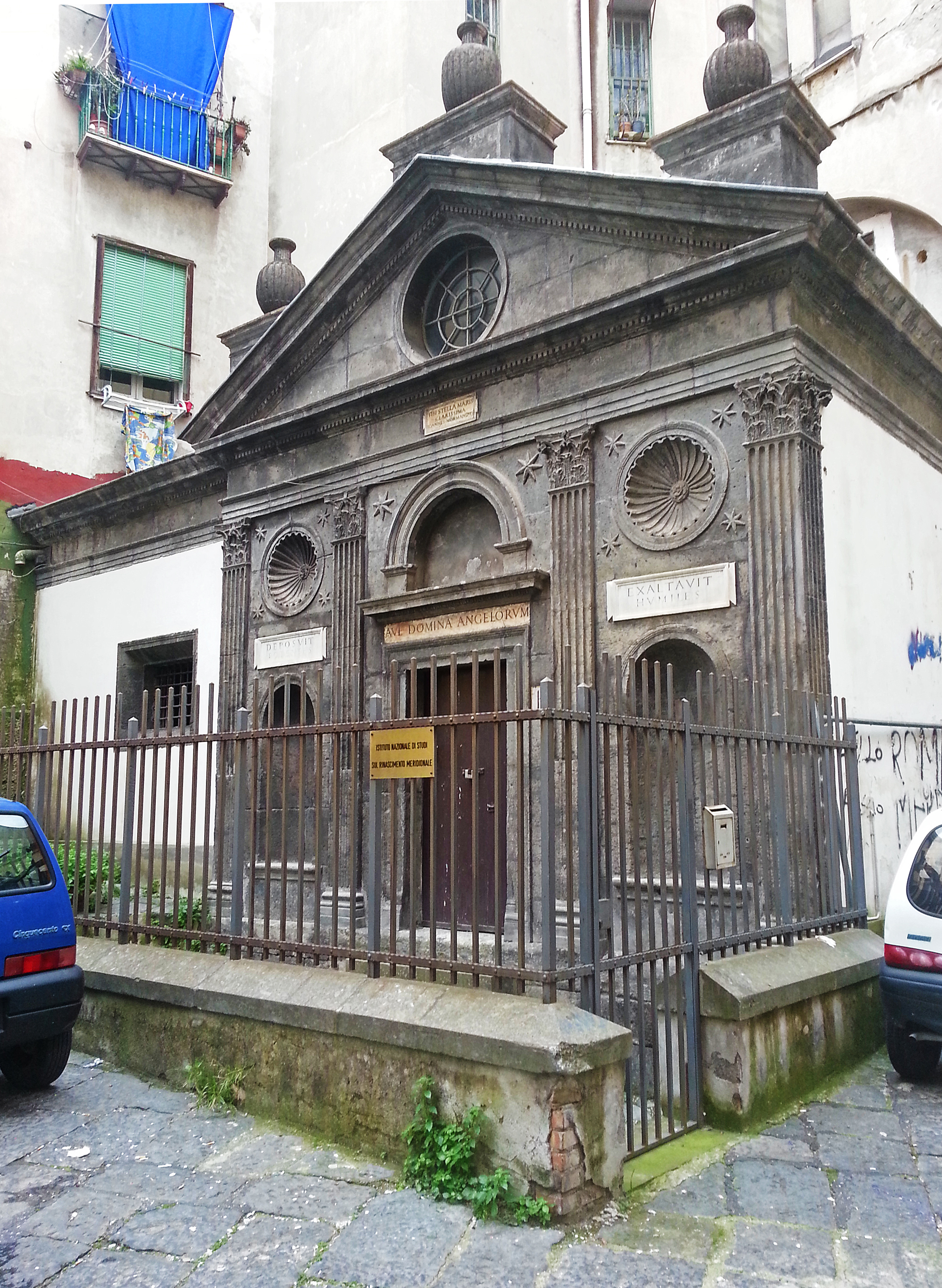
Small church of Santa Maria della Stella alle Paparelle.

Giovanni Francesco Mormando (1449 in Mormanno – 1530 in Naples) was an Italian architect active in Naples, Italy.

He helped designing the church of Santi Severino e Sossio. He also worked on the Chiesetta della Stella (Santa Maria della Stella alle Paparelle), and the Palazzo Filomarini for the Principe della Rocca. He is said to have met with and worked in the style of Leon Battista Alberti. The architect Sigismondo di Giovanni, who designed the Seggio di Nido and the cupola for the church of Santi Severino e Sossio, was his pupil. He traveled to Spain, to work for Ferdinand of Aragon, where he died. He putatively designed his home in Naples, Palazzo Mormando, located on via San Gregorio Armeno.

== Sources ==
- Milizia, Francesco (1797). Dizionario delle Belle Arti del Disegno y Estratto in Gran Parte dalla Enciclopedia Metodica da Francesco Milizia, Seconda Edizione, Tomo Secondo. London, England: J. Taylor Architectural Library. p. 78.
- Milizia, Francesco (1826). The lives of celebrated architects, ancient and modern. Volume 1 Translated by Mrs. Edward Cresy. pp. 225–226.
