= State Archives of Naples =

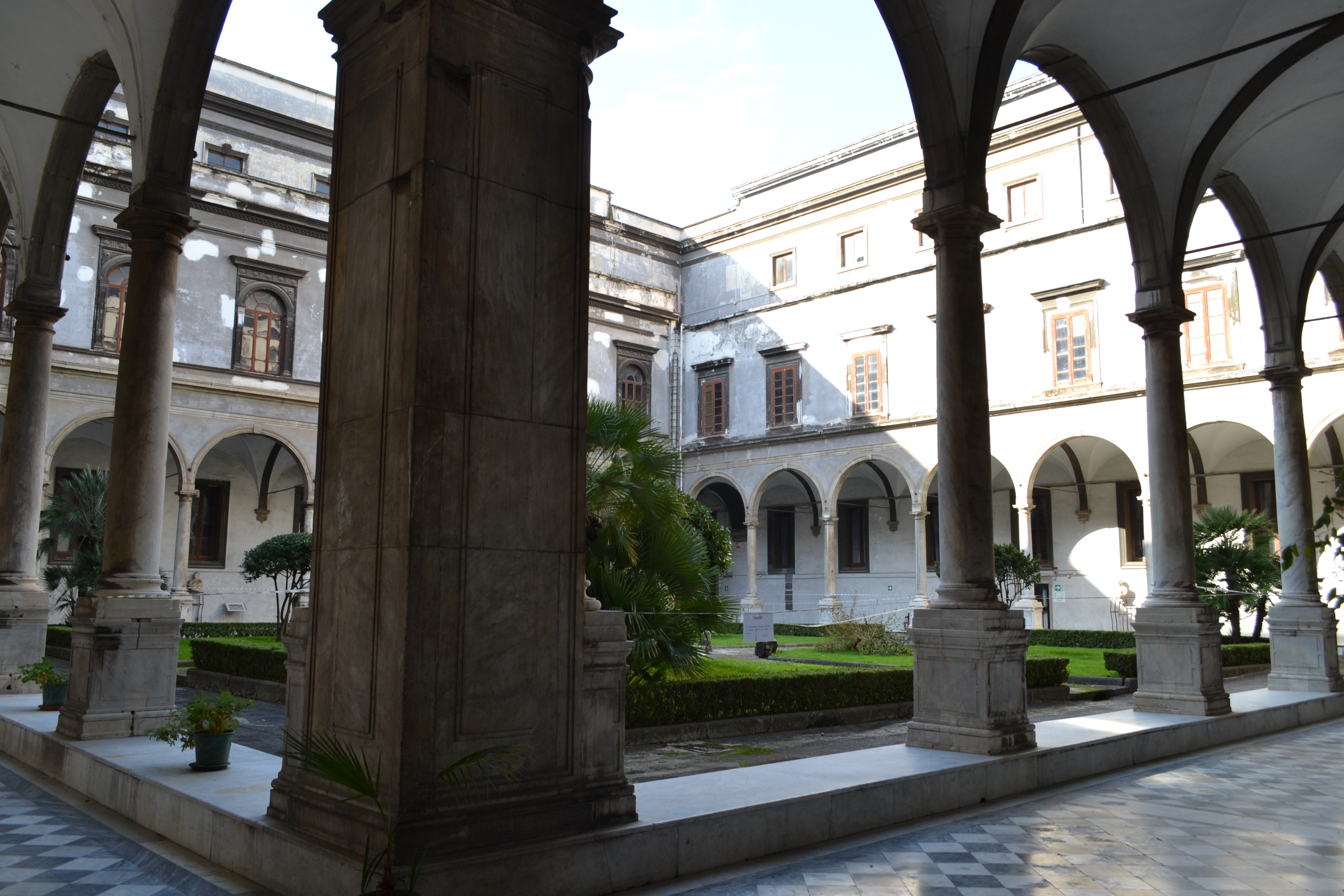
- The cloisters of the church of St. Severino and Sossio
- Interactive map of State Archives of Naples
- 40.8484°N 14.2592°E
- Location: Piazzetta del Grande Archivio, 5, Naples, Italy
- Type: State archives
- Established: 22 December 1808; 217 years ago
- Director: Candida Carrino

Building information
- Building: Santi Severino e Sossio
- Website: http://www.archiviodistatonapoli.it

The State Archives of Naples (Italian: Archivio di Stato di Napoli) is an archive located in Naples, Italy. With its more than 50,000 linear meters of book and document shelving, is of fundamental importance for the history of southern Italy from the 10th century to today. The archives are housed in the cloisters of the church of Saints Severino and Sossio.

== Destruction during World War II ==
When Italy entered World War II in 1940, it was decided to move the most valuable documents in the State Archives of Naples to the Montesano Villa near San Paolo Belsito. The historian Richard Filangieri, superintendent of the archives from 1934 to 1956, supervised the transfer of 30,000 volumes and 50,000 parchments in 866 cases. The less valuable contents were left in Naples.

Following Italy's surrender on 8 September 1943, German troops occupied Naples and the surrounding region. On 27 September, a civilian uprising broke out in Naples. In San Paolo Belsito, a German soldier was killed. The Montesano Villa was visited by German soldiers the following day, and on 30 September they burned it to the ground, having given only fifteen minutes' warning. Filangieri pleaded with the commander in a letter, explaining that the documents were of historical interest only and that among them were important documents of the German Staufer dynasty that had ruled southern Italy in 1194–1268, but he was ignored. Only eleven cases of notarial documents and 97 cartons of the Farnese Archives were saved.

Among the documents lost were the Catalogus Baronum, the 378 chancery registers of the Angevin dynasty (1265–1435), the chancery registers of the House of Barcelona in Sicily, the original treaties of the Kingdom of Naples, the greater part of the archives of the Kingdom of the Two Sicilies and part of the archives of the Order of Malta. Filangieri devoted the entire final part of his life to reconstructing, from various incomplete sources, the contents of the wealth of documents that had been destroyed, editing the first volumes of the Registri della Cancelleria Angioina published by the Accademia Pontaniana.

== See also ==
- List of State Archives of Italy
