= Gaeta Diocesan Museum =

Museum in Lazio, Italy

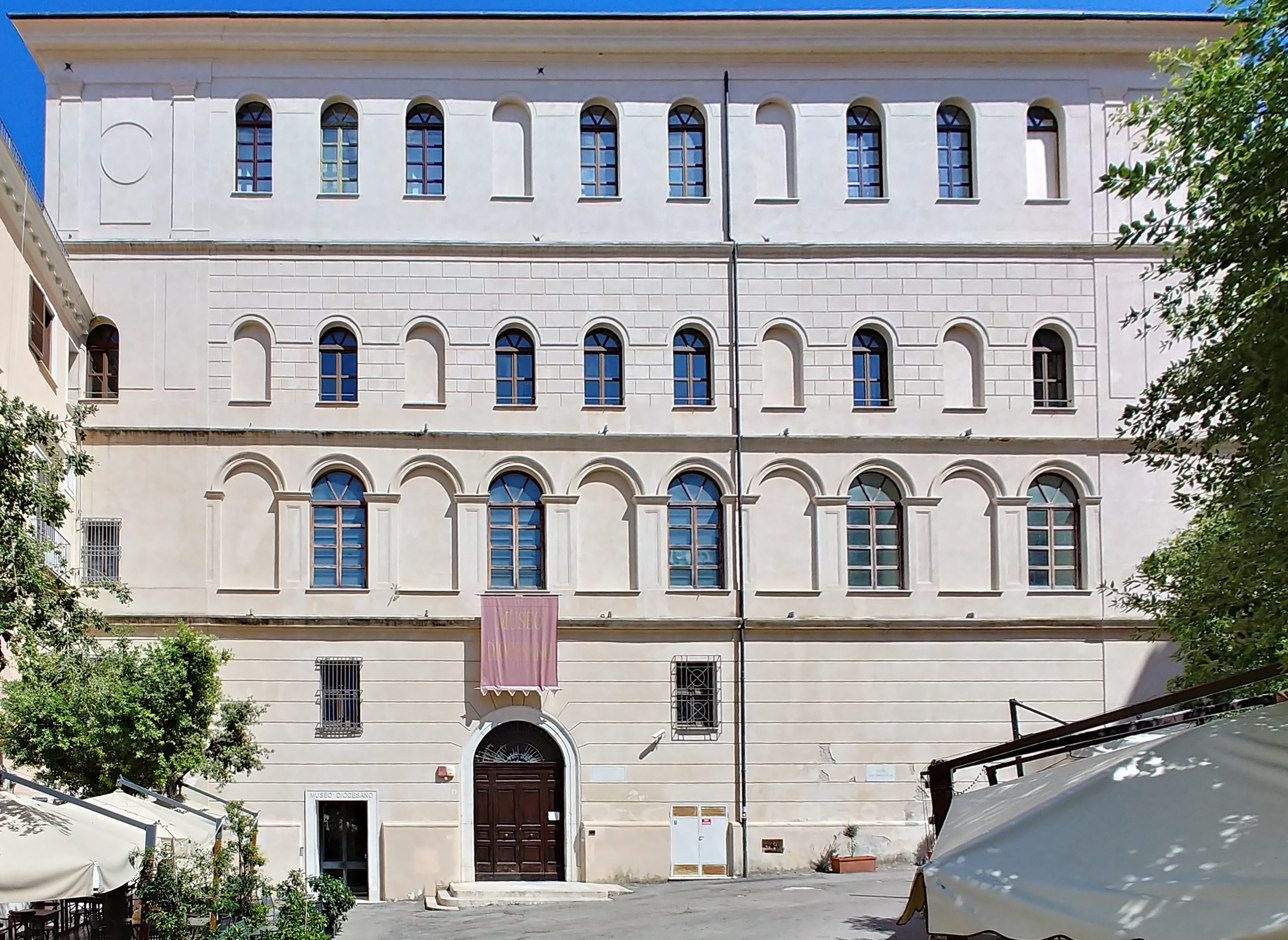
Palazzo De Vio

The Gaeta Diocesan Museum, formally known as the Museo Diocesano e della Religiosità del Parco dei Monti Aurunci, displays a collection of religious objects and artworks, and is housed in the Palazzo De Vio, adjacent to the cathedral of Gaeta, region of Lazio, Italy.

The palace was refurbished by Cardinal Tommaso De Vio, relative of Thomas Cajetan, as his palace in the 1700s. The collection first displayed next to church in 1976, was established as the diocesan museum in this palace was established in 1999. It houses sacred objects of silver and coral, as well as numerous artworks.

Among the works represented are:

- Christ, Virgin, and St John the Evangelist detached fresco from the refectory of the former convent of San Francesco by Giovanni da Gaeta
- Ascension of the Virgin and Adoration of the Magi, altarpieces from the church of San Francesco attributed to Girolamo Imparato
- Rest in Egypt, altarpiece from San Francesco by Francesco Solimena.
- Pietà (after 1520) from the Duomo by Quentin Massys,
- Madonna delle Idrie from the Duomo by Giovanni da Gaeta
- Christ carrying Cross from the Duomo by Luis de Morales
- Standard of Lepanto (1571), ship's battle flag by Girolamo Siciolante
- Other works by Scipione Pulzone, Sebastiano Conca, Pompeo Batoni, Dirk Hendricksz (o Teodoro D'Errico), and Fabrizio Santafede.
