= Catalogus Baronum =

1322 Sicilian administrative document

The Catalogus Baronum ("Catalogue of the Barons") is a compilation of registers concerning the military obligations owed by the barons of the Kingdom of Sicily. The surviving collection was compiled in 1322 under the Angevin dynasty. It contains three distinct registers from different periods and covering different regions of the kingdom. Although often treated primarily as a feudal or military register, the Catalogus is also a fundamental source for the study of lordship, county organization, and royal administration in the mainland provinces of the kingdom. James Hill has re-examined the text chiefly in relation to recruitment and the administration of the armies of the Norman kingdom, while Hervin Fernández-Aceves has emphasized its value for reconstructing lordship, county reorganization, aristocratic agency, and royal administration in the mainland provinces.

The first, the Quaternus magne expeditionis, was originally compiled under the Norman king Roger II in 1150–51, then revised by his grandson, William II in 1167–68. It listed the fiefs of the crown in the Principality of Capua, the Duchy of Apulia, and the Abruzzi and detailed the services each owed. The second register was composed under William around 1175. It lists only the knights of Aquino, Arce, and Sora. The third register, the Pheudatarii iusticiaratus Capitanatae, is that of the Swabian king Frederick II from 1239–40. It lists only the feudatories of the Capitanate. In Fernández-Aceves's interpretation, the Norman material in particular has also been used to reconstruct the reorganization of counties after the creation of the kingdom and the role of royal comestabuli in coordinating military control on the peninsula.

The single manuscript, known as Angevin Register 1322 A (242), was kept in the State Archives of Naples until 1943, when it was destroyed along with many other documents when occupying German troops set fire to the archives during the Second World War. It was itself based on a now-lost late 13th-century document, the so-called "Swabian Copy", which contained a copy of the original Quaternus alongside Frederick II's register. The editio princeps of the collection was published in 1653 by Carlo Borrelli, who also gave the document the name by which it is known, Catalogus Baronum. A modern critical edition by Evelyn Jamison was published in 1972 based on surviving photostats.

== Editions ==
- Borrelli, Carlo, ed. (1653). "Catalogus baronum neapolitano in regno versantium qui sub auspiciis Gulielmi cognomento Boni, expeditionem ad Terram Sanctam sibi vindicandam susceperunt". Vindex Neapolitanae nobilitatis. Naples: Egidio Longo. pp. 5–154.
- Fimiani, Carmine, ed. (1787). "Catalogus Baronum regni neopolitani sub Gulielmo II rege conditus pro expeditione ad Terram Sanctam suscepienda". Commentariolus de subfeudis ex iure langobardico et neapolitano. Naples: Tipografia Simoniana. pp. 49–326.
- Del Re, Giuseppe, ed. (1845). "Catalogus Baronum neapolitano in regno versantium qui sub auspiciis Gulielmi cognomento Boni ad Terram Sanctam sibi vindicandam susceperunt". Cronisti e scrittori sincroni napoletani: Storia della Monarchia. Vol. I: Normanni. Naples: Stamperia dell'Iride. pp. 571–616.
- Jamison, Evelyn, ed. (1972). Catalogus Baronum. Fonti per la storia d'Italia, 101 (1). Rome: Istituto storico italiano per il Medio Evo.
