= D'Agnolo =

D'Agnolo is an Italian surname. Notable people with the surname include:

- Agnolo di Baccio d'Agnolo, 16th century Italian architect
- Baccio D'Agnolo (1462–1543), Italian woodcarver, sculptor, and architect
