= Agnolo =

Agnolo may refer to:

- Gabriele Agnolo, an Italian architect
- Agnolo (given name), an Italian masculine given name

== See also ==
- Agnoli
- D'Agnolo
