= Jorge Ginarte =

Argentine footballer and coach

Personal information
- Date of birth: 16 May 1940
- Place of birth: Buenos Aires, Argentina
- Date of death: 7 June 2010 (aged 70)
- Position: Central defender

Senior career*
Years	Team	Apps	(Gls)
1965–1967	Sarmiento	?	(?)
1968	Racing	?	(?)
1969–1970	Los Andes	?	(?)
Total		?	(?)

Managerial career
- 1974: Temperley
- 1999: Los Andes
- * Club domestic league appearances and goals

Jorge Ginarte (1940 – 7 June 2010) was an Argentine professional football player and coach.

== Career ==
=== Playing career ===
Born in Buenos Aires, Ginarte played club football as a central defender for teams including Sarmiento and Los Andes. Ginarte won the Trofeo Costa del Sol in 1968 with Racing. He also played in Round One of the Copa Argentina in 1970 for Los Andes.

=== Coaching career ===
After retiring as a player, Ginarte coached a number of Argentine club sides. He won the Nacional B in 1974 with Temperley, and came second in 1999 with Los Andes.

== Death ==
Ginarte died on 7 June 2010 at the age of 70.
