= Agnoli =

Agnoli is an Italian surname. Notable people with the surname include:

- Johannes Agnoli (1925–2003), German-Italian political scientist
- Valerio Agnoli (born 1985), Italian bicycle racer

== See also ==
- Agnolin
- Agnolo (disambiguation)
