= Santi Severino e Sossio =

Church of Santi Severino e Sossio
- Chiesa dei Santi Severino e Sossio
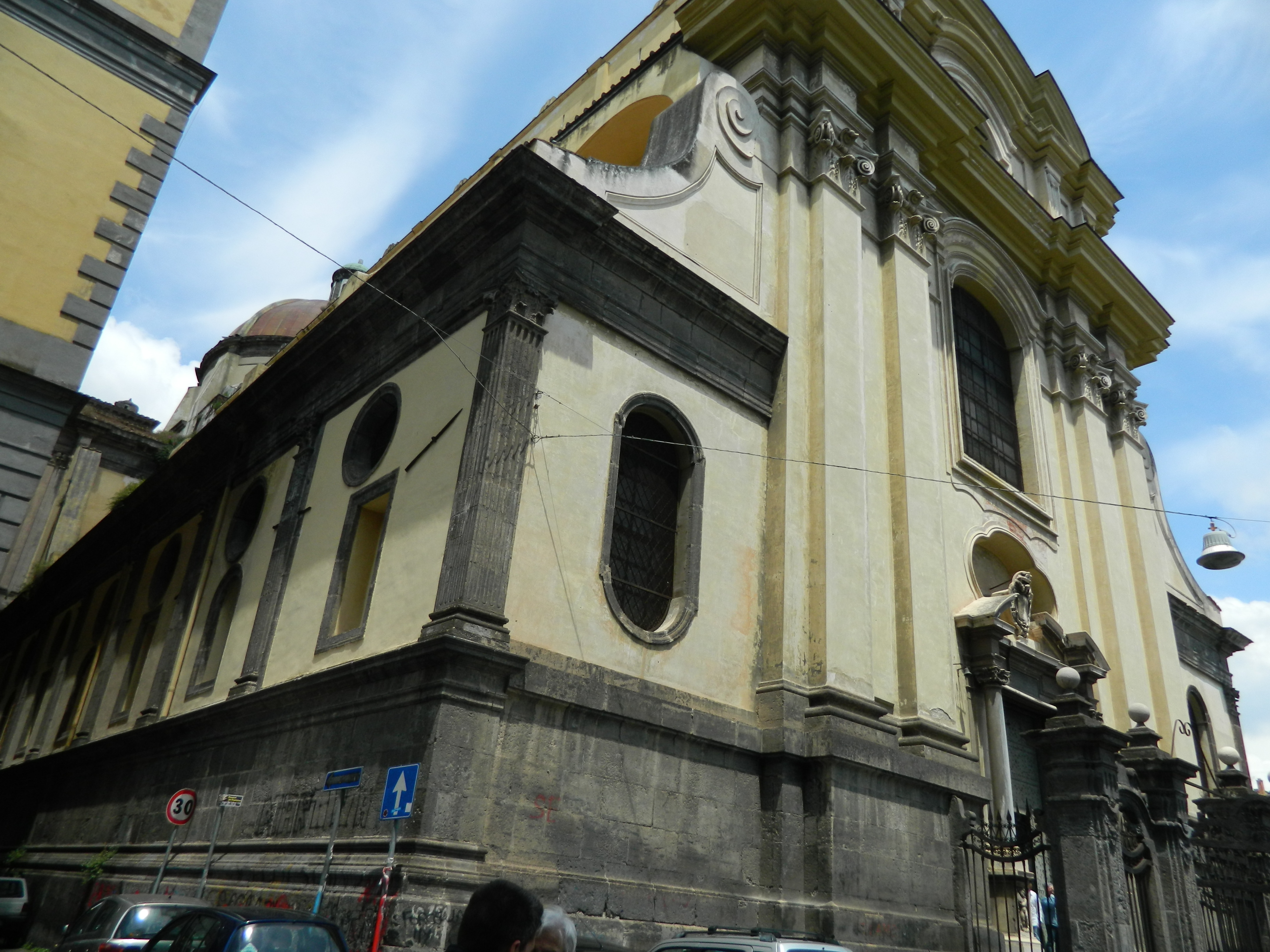
- The façade of church.
- Church of Santi Severino e Sossio
- 40.847764°N 14.258294°E
- Location: Via Bartolommeo Capasso; Naples; Province of Naples, Campania
- Country: Italy
- Denomination: Roman Catholic

History
- Status: Active

Architecture
- Architectural type: Church
- Style: Baroque architecture

Administration
- Diocese: Roman Catholic Archdiocese of Naples

The church of Santi Severino e Sossio and the annexed monastery are located on via Bartolommeo Capasso in Naples, Italy.

The church is attached to one of the oldest monasteries in the city, and from 1835 it has housed the State Archives of Naples. It was founded in the tenth century by the Benedictine Order, but the Saracen raids of the time forced them to abandon the old monastery, located on the hill of Pizzofalcone, taking the relics of San Severino with them. In 904 they added to these the relics of San Sossio, martyred companion of San Gennaro. They remained here till 1808, when they were taken to Frattamaggiore.

During the Angevin reign a number of important events occurred in this monastery, such as the convening of parliament in 1394 by the Sanseverino family, who were supporters of Louis II of Anjou. In 1490, the architect Giovanni Francesco Mormando from Calabria laid the foundations of the present church, which was completed by the 16th century by Giovanni Francesco di Palma. The cupola built in 1561 was one of the first in Naples, designed by the Florentine architect Sigismondo di Giovanni.

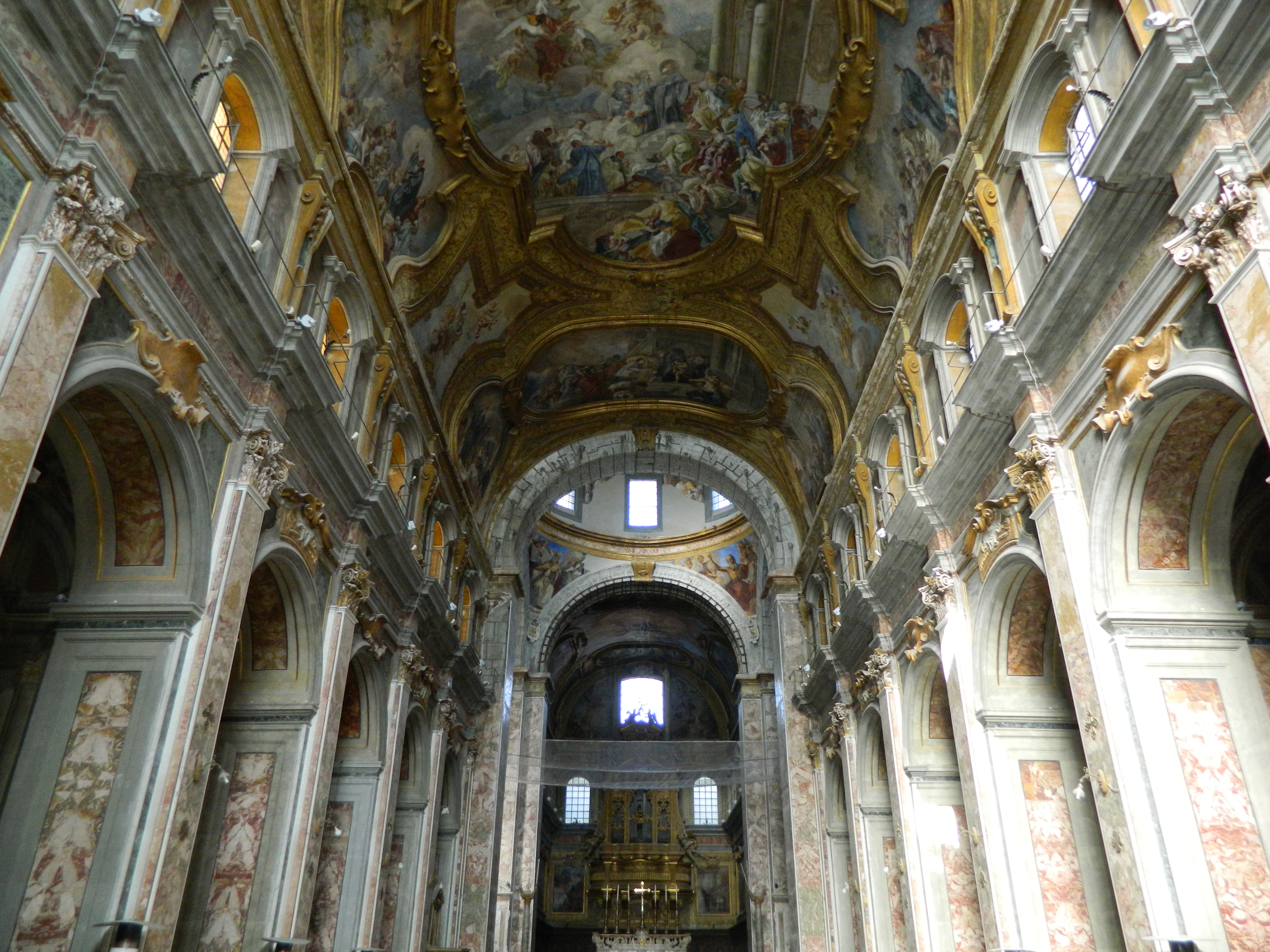
Interior

The frescoes of the cupola (1566), now lost, were originally painted by a Flemish painter by the name of Pablo or Paolo Schepers. Other painters active in the church comprised a polyglot series of artists, including Marco Pino of Siena, Benvenuto Tortelli of Brescia, Bartolomeo Chiarini of Rome, Cosimo Fanzago of Bergamo, and lastly Fabrizio di Guido from Carrara. The last painter was active in the Medici chapel. .

There is a long tradition of Tuscan artists residing in Naples, and was stimulated by the arrival of a group of master artisans from Carrara in the late 1500s, after the marriage of Alberico Cybo Malaspina and the Neapolitan Isabella of Capua, from the Duchy of Termoli. But there had already been a large contingent of Tuscan traders and financiers in Naples. For example, Antonio Piccolomini used the Strozzi family to negotiate having Antonio Rossellino and Benedetto da Maiano participate in the decoration of the Piccolomini Chapel in the church of Sant'Anna dei Lombardi. In addition, Tino di Camaino and Giotto apparently visited Naples under Angevin patronage.

The decor of the chapels of Santi Severino e Sossio follows a pattern common to late Renaissance Neapolitan chapels: a reclining figure embedded within an architectural arched entablature, and the large altarpiece framed like a tabernacle, with lateral walls also holding paintings, and the lunettes painted in fresco.

The wooden choir (1573) was designed by Benvenuto Tortelli da Brescia, and became a model for others in Southern Italy. In fact, monks from the Benedictine convent of San Martino delle Scale in Palermo requested a choir that "conformed" to that of San Severino. It also influenced other choir stalls and woodwork, including San Paolo Maggiore completed in 1583 by Giovan Lorenzo d'Albano (destroyed in last war), work in the sacristy of Santa Caterina a Formiello and S. Maria delle Grazie a Caponapoli (works by Martino Migliore), and finally the choirs in the church of Santi Apostoli, Santa Maria la Nova, and the Cathedral (1616) by Marcantonio Ferraro.

Construction continued in the 18th century by Giovanni del Gaizo, who finished the facade using a design by Giovan Battista Nauclerio. When the Benedictines were expelled in 1799, the convent was occupied by the order of Sanfedisti and in 1813, became the collegio di Marina. In 1835 it became the archive of the state, which is still its present function.

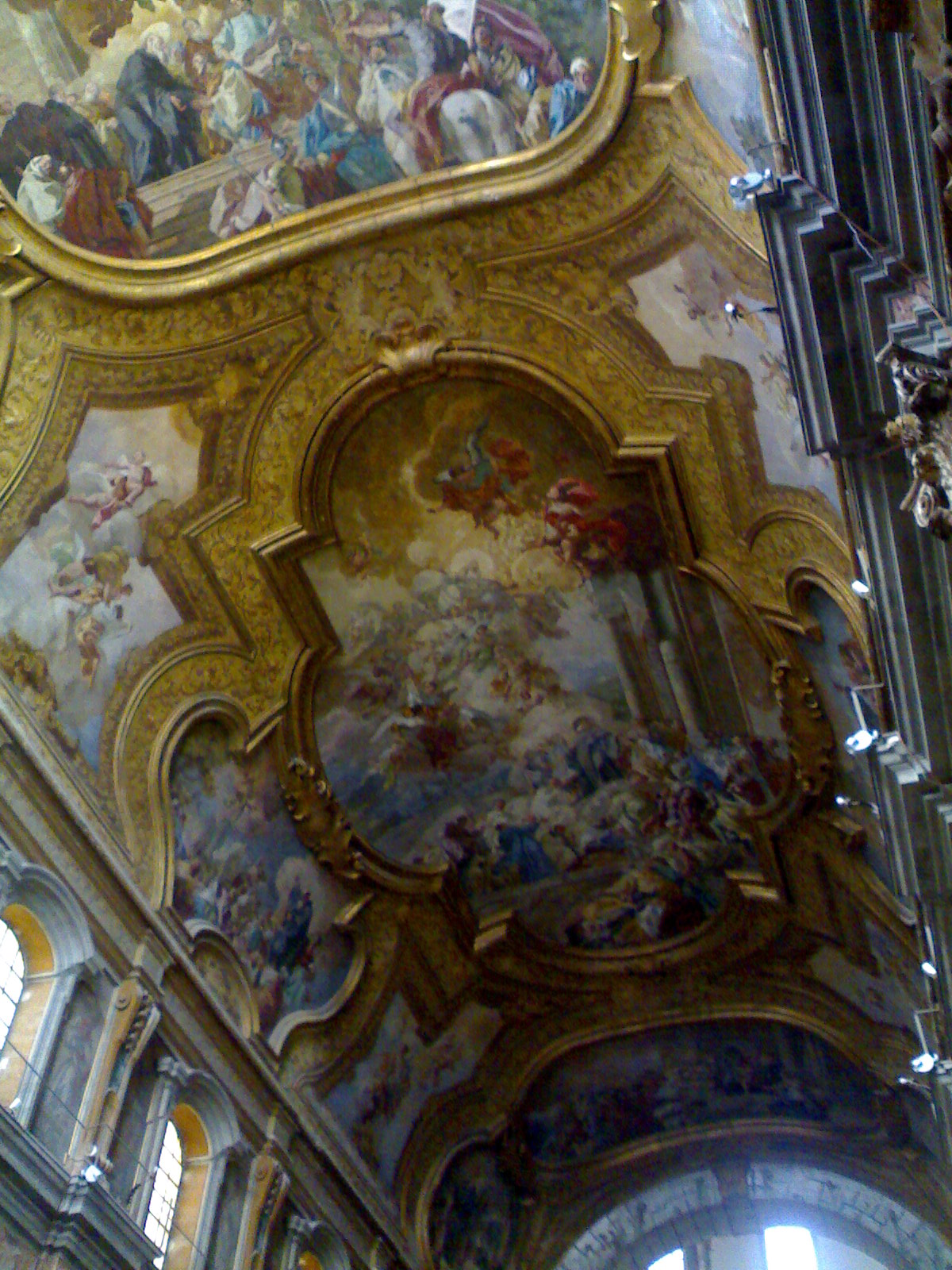
Ceiling

In the apse of the church main altar and the balustrade of presbytery (1640) were made and designed by Cosimo Fanzago. In 1783 the main altar was remodeled by Giacomo Mazzotti, the floor dates to 1697.

The church has a Latin cross plan with seven chapels on each side and a deep rectangular apse. The nave frescoes and canvases were painted by Francesco de Mura, while the lateral chapels include works of the painter Marco Pino and the neapolitan sculptor Giovanni da Nola. Of note, is the funerary monument of Camillo de' Medici, completed by Girolamo D'Auria at the end of the 16th century. Through the sacristy one can access the lower church, built and decorated in Renaissance style, completed by Mormando.

== The chapels ==
=== Right nave ===
Most of the chapels on the right side were completed by the mid- to late 16th century, but their ownership passed through various hands.

The first chapel, belonging in 1550 to the cavalier Annibale Mastrogiudice, became property of the Genoese Cristofaro Grimaldi in 1576.

The second chapel was bought in 1545 by Giancarlo Casanova, then passed to Prospero Tuttavilla in 1591.

The third chapel, initially owned by 1541 by Marino Mastrogiudice (aristocrat and lawyer from Sorrento and president of a Royal Advisory panel, the Regia Camera della Sommaria). From Mastrogiudice it passed to the Saliceti Family in 1551, and then to Fabio Giordano by 1568;

The fourth chapel in 1559 belonged to Giannandrea and by 1561 to Ottaviano de Curtis.

The fifth chapel was assigned to the jurist Teano Gianfelice Scalaleone and by 1598 to the Genoese jurist consult Francesco Massa

The sixth chapel was assigned to Francesco Albertini, juristconsult of Nola in 1549;

Below the church is the tomb of Giovan Battista Cicaro (c. 1507–1512), with an epitath written by Jacopo Sannazaro: Liquisti gemitum miseræ / lacrymasq<ue> parenti, / pro quibus infelix / hunc tibi dat timulum. Construction of the tomb monument itself has been attributed once to either Giovanni da Nola or a Spanish sculptor by the name of Pietro della Plata, but later scholarship seems to attribute them to Andrea Ferrucci da Fiesole and Bartolomé Ordóñez.

=== Left nave ===
The Chapel of Medici di Gragnano, which holds the tomb of Camillo de' Medici (1596), was decorated in a sumptuous Tuscan style, the first of its kind in Naples, using polychrome inlay not only in pavement but also in walls. The chapel and monument are works by Girolamo D'Auria and Fabrizio di Guido.

This chapel is off the left nave.

=== The apse chapels ===
The Sanseverino chapel and the chapel of Girolamo Gesualdo, flank the main altar. They were decorated in the mid-1500s, before the completion of the church in 1567.

The Sanseverino Chapel, dedicated to the body of Christ, was conceived by Ippolita de Monti, wife of Ugo and Countess of Saponara, as a pantheon of the family. Over the years, in addition to house the tomb of the founder and also three of her young children (who had been murdered). The chapel was enriched with shields, medallions and inscriptions, commemorating members of the family: the warrior Alessandro de Monti, (died 22 June 1622); Julia de Monti, placed in the tomb (1715) by son Geronimo de Monti-Sanfelice, Duke of Lauriano, who lived in the first half of the 18th century; Salvatore Capua-Sanseverino, Prince of Riccia and Marquis of Raia, who died in 1858. With its classic architecture the arches of the chapel imitates lateral chapels of the church of Sant'Anna dei Lombardi, where just two years later Florentine artists introduce in the Tuscan taste for sumptuous decoration in fresco and stucco motifs.

On the 16th century pavement, many tombs are found, including that of Belisario Corenzio, who died in a fall from the scaffolding while he frescoed the vault of this church. After much of the ceilings collapse in the 1731 earthquake, they were refrescoed by Francesco De Mura, who also painted the counterfacade (1739) and Giovanni Paolo Melchiorri, who painted the choir ceiling with a Glory of St Benedict. The stucco of the nave was completed by Giuseppe Scarola. The Sacristy conserves a complete cycle of frescoes by Onofrio De Lione, brother of Andrea and student of Corenzio. Onofrio painted the Old Testament Scenes (1651). The Trinity fresco was painted by Corenzio

The church has three cloisters:

- The first, called the Chiostro del Platano, was so called due to a plantain tree which legend holds was planted by St. Benedict and whose leaves had healing powers. The plant was demolished in 1959, when the trunk measured 8.45 m in circumference. In the portico, originally stood upright columns, then replace of pilasters, and frescoed by Solario, with scenes of the life of St. Benedict;
- The second, called the Chiostro del Noviziato was built in the 15th century, in a rectangular plan, supported by thirty arches resting on pillars Piperno rock. In 1803, the upper floor was converted into a two-story building, designed in part to the accommodate a school. At the center stands a bust of Bartolommeo Capasso;
- The third, called the Marble Cloister (Chiostro di Marmo), was built between the 1500s. The arches of the cloister are supported by columns in white Carrara marble.

== See also ==
- 16th-century Western domes

== Bibliography ==
- Pietro de Stefano, Descrittione dei luoghi sacri della città di Napoli, Publisher Raymondo Amato, Naples, 1560, pp. 88–89,
- Cesare D'Engenio Caracciolo, Napoli sacra Naples, per Ottavio Beltrano, 1623, p. 316-334.
- Carlo de Lellis, Parte second o' vero Supplimento a Napoli sacra di Don Cesare D'Engenio Caracciolo, Naples per Roberto Mollo, 1654, p. 163.
- Benedetto Laudati, Breve chronicon regalis neapolitani monasterii Sancti Severini et Sossi, in Mariano Armellini, Bibliotheca benedectino-casinensis, sive scriptorum casinensis congregationis alias Sancta Justina patavina qui in ea ad hac usque tempora floruerunt operum ac gestorum notitia, Assisi, 1731–1732;
- Giuseppe Sigismondo, Descrizione della città di Napoli e suoi borghi del dottor Giuseppe Sigismondo napoletano, 2nd Volume, Naples, publisher Terres brothers, 1788, pp. 68–82.
- Luigi d'Afflitto, Guida per i curiosi e per i viaggiatori which vengono alla città di Napoli, Naples, Tipografia Chianese, 1834, pp. 218.
- Giovanni Battista Ajello, Napoli e i luoghi celebri delle sue vicinanze, Napoli, Stab. Tip. di G. Nobile, 1845, p. 233-242, accessible su google libri;
- Scipione Volpicella, Principali edificii della città di Napoli, Napoli 1847, p. 575-604, accessible in google libri;
- Germanico Patrelli, Memorie dei lavori di riparazione eseguiti in the church dei Padri cassinesi dei Santi Severino e Sossio di Napoli, progettati e diretti dal maggiore cavaliere Germanico Patrelli, Napoli, 1852;
- Giovanni Battista Chiarini, in Carlo Celano, Notizie del bello dell'antico e del curioso della città di Napoli (1856–1860), a cura di Paolo Macry, vol. III, Napoli, Edizioni dell'anticaglia, 2000, pp. 728–732, accessible in google libri;
- Scipione Volpicella, La crociera of the church dei Santi Severino e Sossio di Napoli, in Studi di letteratura, storia, e arti, Napoli, 1856;
- Gaetano Nobile, Un mese a Napoli: descrizione della città di Napoli e delle sue vicinanze divisa in XXX giornate, vol. II, Naples 1863, p. 473.
- Gennaro Aspreno Galante, Memorie dell'antico cenobio lucullano di San Severino abate in Napoli, Naples, 1869.
- Ferdinando Carafa, Notizie storiche intorno alla Chiesa dei santi Severino e Sossio, Napoli, 1876;
- Bartolomeo Capasso, Monumenta ad neapolitani ducatus pertinentia, Naples, 1881;
- Scipione Volpicella, Memorie patrie. The church dei Santi Severino e Sossio: pavimento della nave, in “La Carità”, XXIX, novembre 1881, pp. 781–802;
- Nunzio Federico Faraglia, Memorie artistiche of the church benedettina dei Santi Severino e Sossio, in “Archivio Storico per le Province Napoletane”, III, 1887, pp. 235–252;
- Giuseppe Molinaro, Santi Severino e Sossio, Naples, 1930;
- Egildo Gentile, I benedettini a Napoli, in “Benedectina”, VII, 1–2, 1953, pp. 39–44;
- Jole Mazzoleni, Il monastero benedettino dei Santi Severino e Sossio, Naples, 1964;
- Maria Raffaella Pessolano, Il monastero napoletano dei Santi Severino e Sossio, Naples, 1977;
- Jole Mazzoleni, L'Archivio del monastero benedettino dei Santi Severino e Sossio conservato presso l'Archivio di Stato di Napoli, Naples, 1984.
