= Carlos De Marta =

Argentine footballer

Carlos Alberto De Marta (1960/61 – 22 April 2016) was an Argentine footballer who is last known to have played as a midfielder for Cipolletti.

== Early life ==
De Marta was deaf-mute from birth.

== Career ==
De Marta started his career with Argentine top flight side Estudiantes and then played for Temperley, Belgrano de Córdoba, Los Andes, Huracán, Argentino de Quilmes, Defensores de Cambaceres and Cipolletti before retiring. In total, he made 189 appearances and scored nine goals in the Argentine top flight.

== Style of play ==
De Marta operated as a midfielder and winger.

== Death ==
De Marta died on 22 April 2016 at the age of sixty-five.
