= San Giovanni a Carbonara =

Church of San Giovanni a Carbonara
- Chiesa di San Giovanni a Carbonara
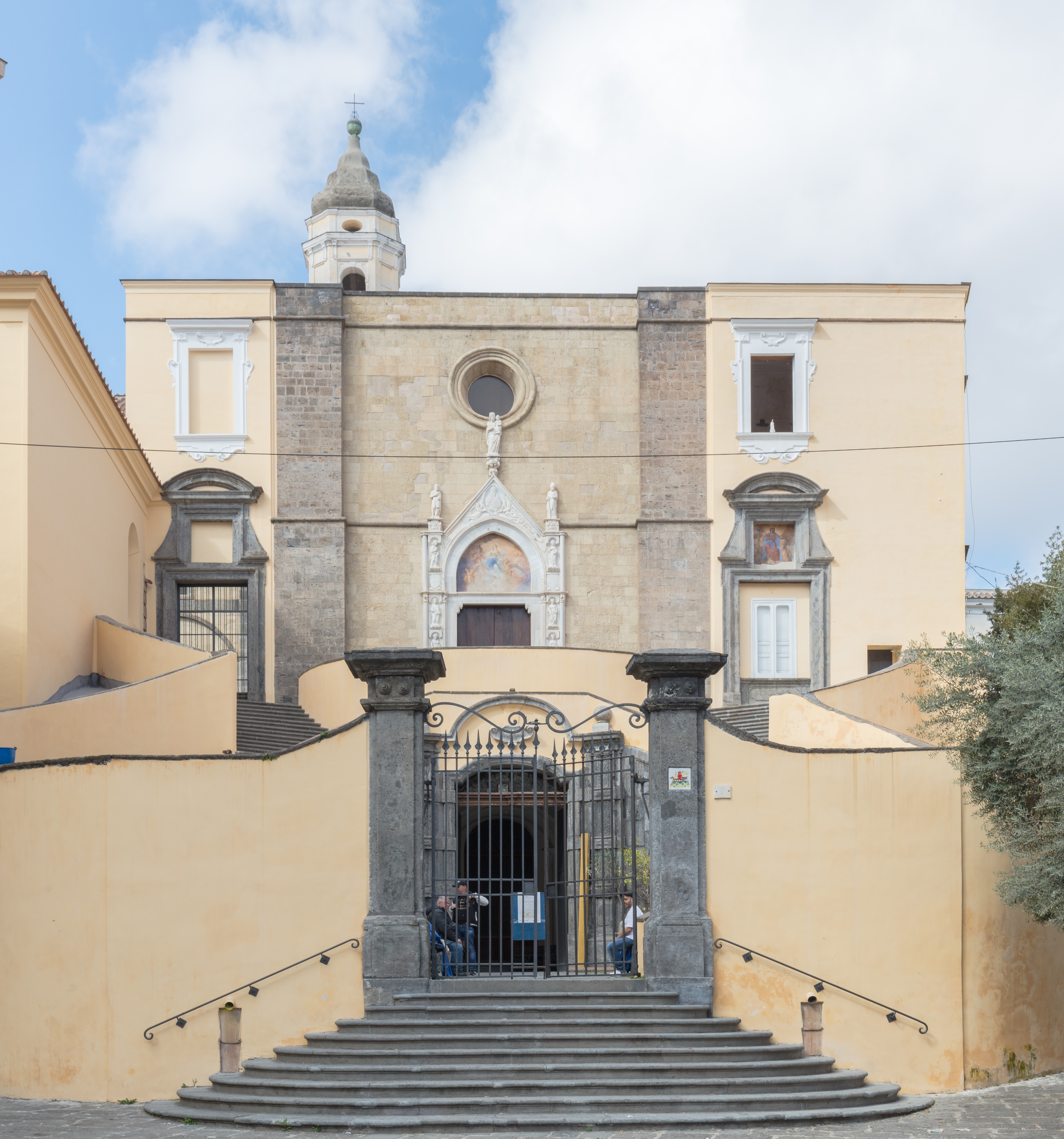
- The façade of San Giovanni a Carbonara
- Church of San Giovanni a Carbonara
- 40.856013°N 14.260372°E
- Location: Naples, Campania
- Country: Italy
- Denomination: Roman Catholic

History
- Status: Active

Architecture
- Architectural type: Gothic architecture
- Groundbreaking: 1339

Administration
- Diocese: Roman Catholic Archdiocese of Naples

San Giovanni a Carbonara is a Gothic church in Naples, Southern Italy. It is located at the northern end of via Carbonara, just outside what used to be the eastern wall of the old city. The name carbonara (meaning 'coal-carrier') was given to this site allocated for the collection and burning of refuse outside the city walls in the Middle Ages.

== History ==
The monastery/church complex of San Giovanni was founded by the Augustinians in 1343. The church was begun in Gotico Angioino style, but completed in the early 15th century under King Ladislaus of Durazzo, who turned the church into a Pantheon-like tribute to the last of the Angevin rulers of Naples.

To the left of the entrance, almost at Via Carbonara is the church of the Pietatella.

== Architecture and decoration ==
The current façade, with its scenographic stairwell entrance was constructed in 1707 or 1708 by Ferdinando Sanfelice. It maintains the Gothic portal with a lunette frescoed by the Lombard Leonardo da Besozzo.

The interior is on the Latin Cross plan, with a rectangular nave. The main altar decorated with polychrome marble dates from 1746. The apse contains Ladislaus' tomb, commissioned by his sister Queen Joanna II from the sculptor Andrea Ciccione. The sepulchre of Sergianni Caracciolo was also completed by Ciccione.

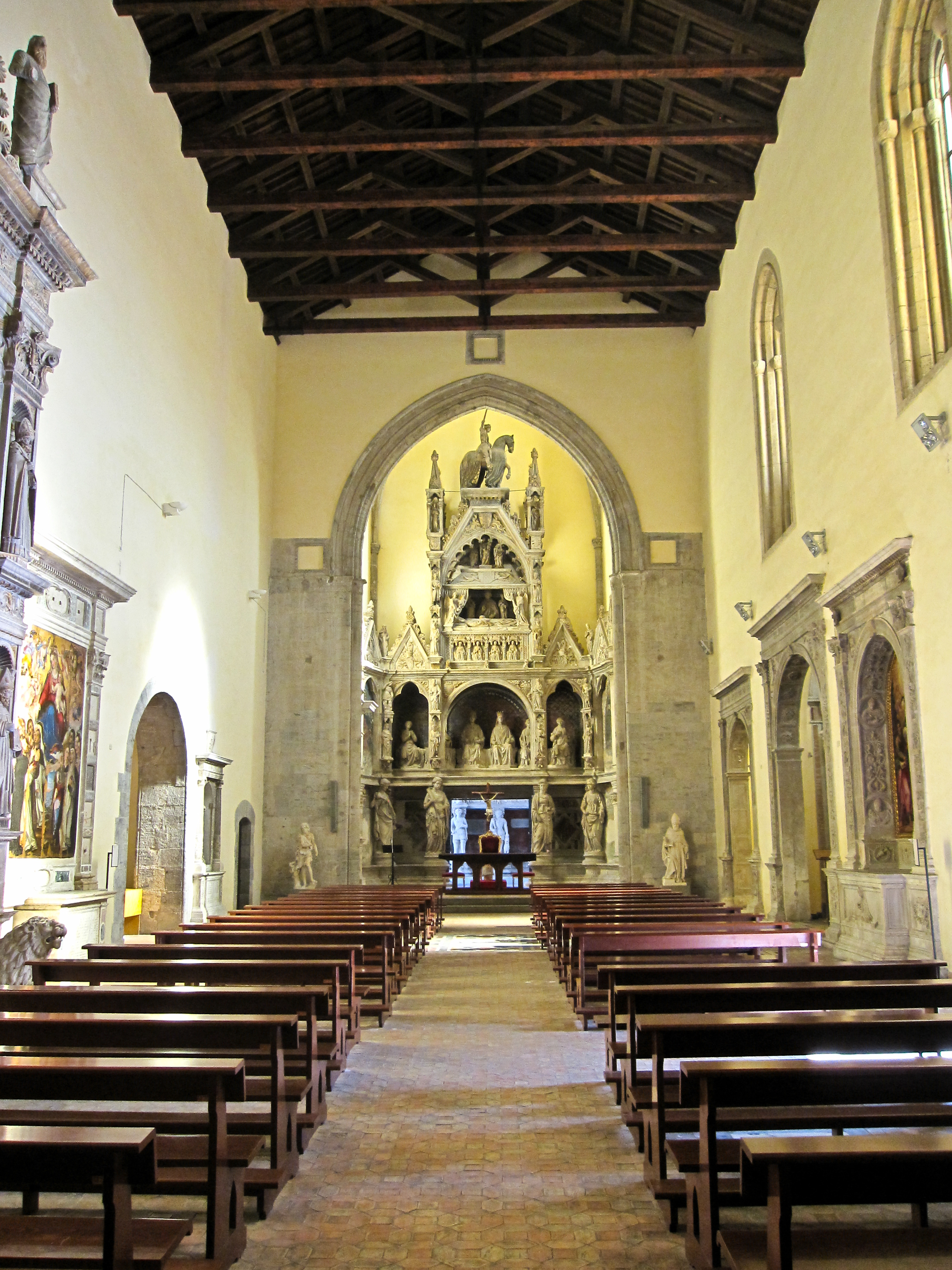
Interior

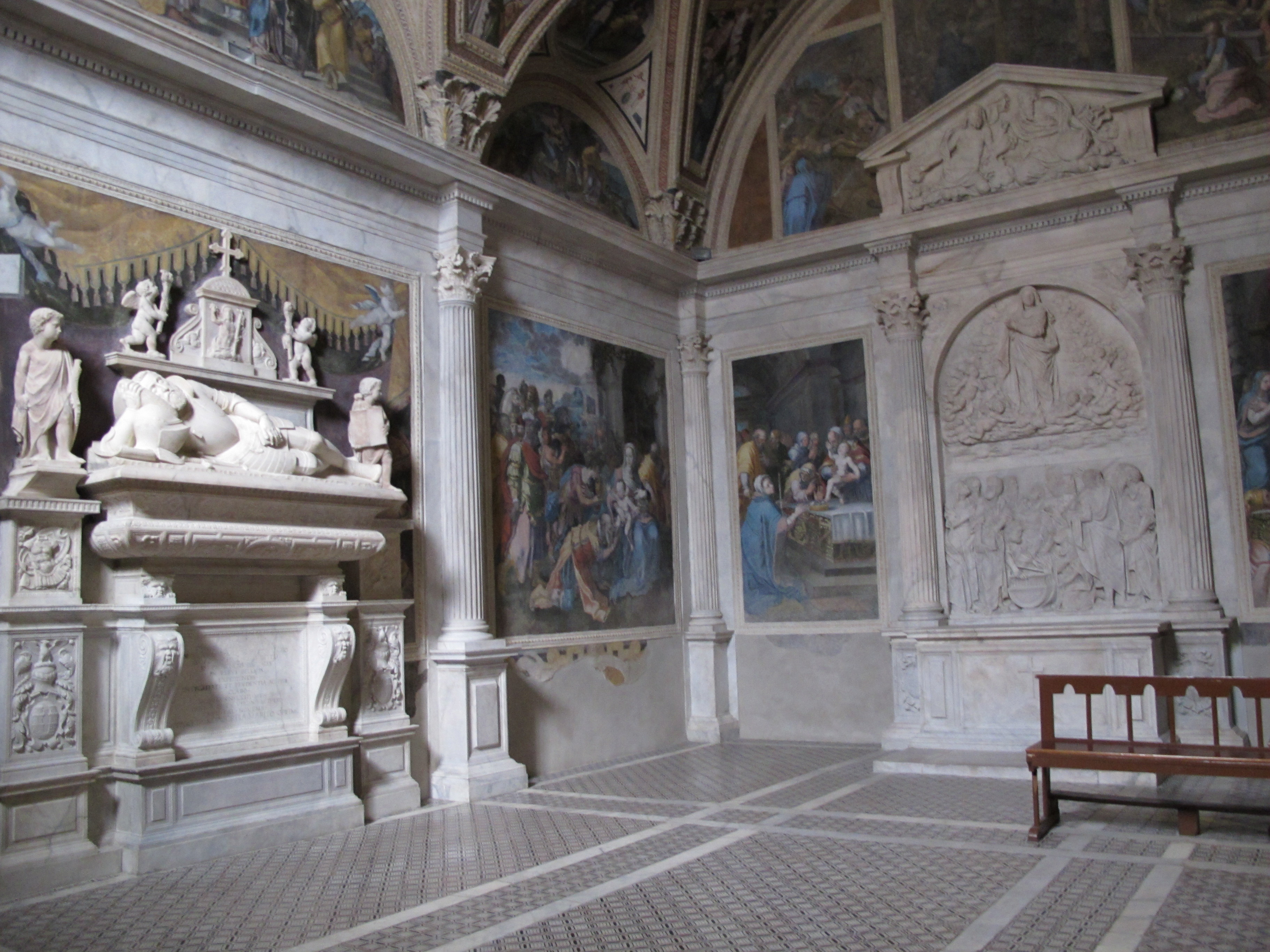
Somma chapel

Among the main chapels are the following:

- Miroballo Chapel (Cappella Miroballo) - Dedicated to St John the Baptist, and decorated by Lombard artists including Malvito and Jacopo della Pila. Here, the tomb of Antonio Miroballo was completed by Lorenzo Vaccaro and was completed before the 15th-century frescoes of San Nicola da Tolentino.
- Caracciolo del Sole Chapel (Cappella Caracciolo del Sole) - Near the apse, entered by passing under the funereal monument to King Ladislao. This Renaissance style chapel has frescoes by Perinetto and Leonardo da Besozzo, and the tomb of Sergianni Caracciolo.
- Caracciolo di Vico Chapel (Cappella Caracciolo di Vico) - This chapel was also completed by Renaissance painters, and included work by sculptors such as Giovanni da Nola, Girolamo Santacroce, Giovanni Domenico D'Auria, Annibale Caccavello, Girolamo D'Auria, Diego de Siloé, and Bartolomé Ordóñez.
- Somma Chapel (Cappella Somma) - To the left of the entrance, this chapel was erected in 1557–1566 by D'Auria and Caccavello.
- Seripando Chapel (Cappella del Crocifisso) - the latter houses a Crucifixion by Giorgio Vasari.

The church also contains a statue of the Madonna delle Grazie (1578) by Michelangelo Naccherino, and a sacristy whose decorative plan was formulated by Giorgio Vasari, with the help of Cristofano Gherardi.

The church was restored in 1856, but was severely damaged by Allied bombardments in 1943.

== See also ==
- 16th-century Western domes
