= Agnolo Aniello Fiore =

Italian sculptor

Agnolo Aniello Fiore (15th century) was an Italian sculptor architect of the Renaissance, active in Naples. He trained under Andrea Ciccione. He is also known as Anniello da Fiore.
