= Giovanni Caracciolo =

Italian nobleman (c. 1372 – 1432)

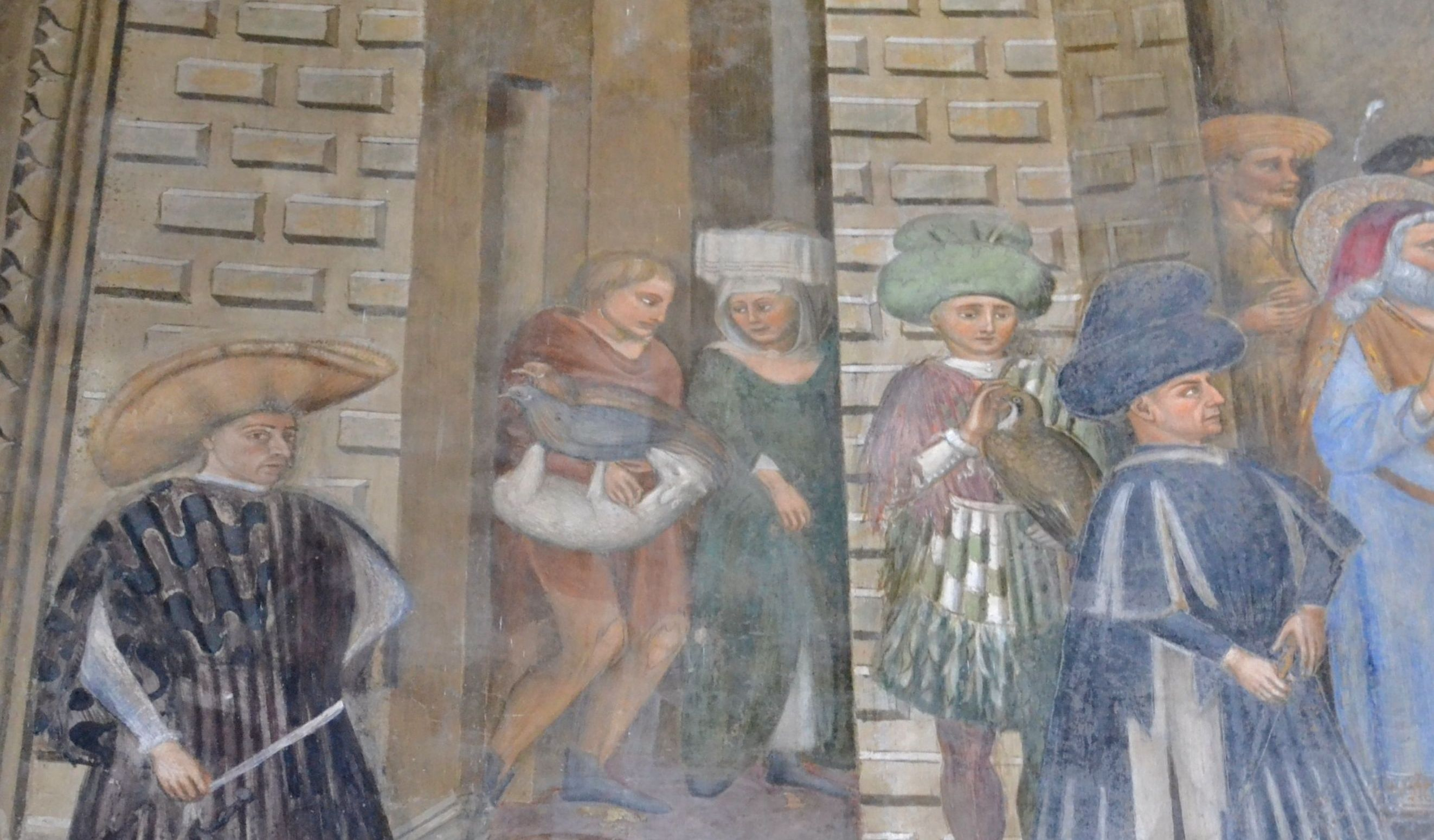

Giovanni Caracciolo, often called Sergianni (c. 1372 – 19 August 1432), was an Italian nobleman of the Kingdom of Naples, prime minister and favorite of queen Joan II of Naples.

Due to his relationship with queen Joan (starting around 1416), Caracciolo was able to attain for himself a considerable amount of power in the Neapolitan court and a great amount of wealth. Around 1425 he was siniscalco (prime minister) of Naples, count of Avellino, lord of Capua, Melfi, Venosa and numerous other fiefs in Campania and Apulia.

Sergianni managed to obtain an increased power in the realm, until he controlled its politics and finances almost entirely. He was behind the decision to abandon the pope's support, which eventually led to the invasion of Louis III of Anjou and to Joan's decision to adopt Alfonso V of Aragon as her heir.

Alfonso had Sergianni arrested in May 1423. However, as the Aragonese soldiers had failed to capture Joan in the siege of Castel Capuano, Sergianni was freed and fled to Aversa with the queen. The situation cleared when Alfonso was called back to Spain, and the queen returned to Naples together with Louis, to whom she was then betrothed. As the latter was a feeble figure who immediately retired to his fiefs in Calabria, the power of Sergianni further increased. Sergianni's exceeding ambition may have pushed Joan to plot his assassination in 1432.

On 19 August 1432, Sergianni Caracciolo was stabbed by four knights in the service of the queen in his room in Castel Capuano.

His elaborate sculpted tomb is located in the church of San Giovanni a Carbonara in Naples.
