= Leonardo da Besozzo =

Italian painter

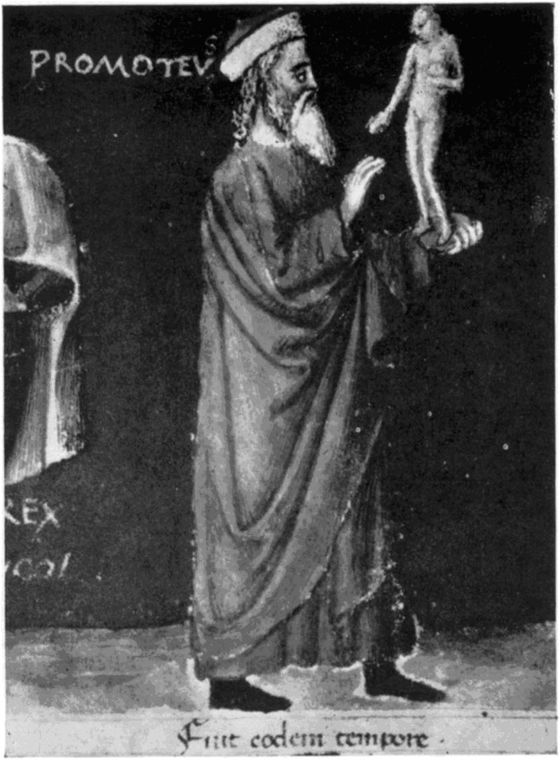
Leonardo da Besozzo, Milano.jpg

Leonardo Da Besozzo or Leonardo Dei Molinari (15th century) was an Italian painter, active in Lombardy and Naples.

== Biography ==
Leonardo is the son of Michelino Molinari da Besozzo, a prominent painter in Lombardy in the early, 15th century.

Born in Besozzo, he also worked in Naples with Perinetto da Benevento in the fresco decoration of the church of San Giovanni a Carbonara.
