= Luciano Agnolín =

Argentine footballer

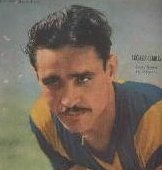
- Agnolín at Atlanta

Personal information
- Full name: Luciano Eufemio Agnolín
- Date of birth: October 20, 1915
- Place of birth: La Paz, Argentina
- Date of death: 15 October 1986 (Aged 70)
- Position: Centre forward

Senior career*
Years	Team	Apps	(Gls)
1935–1936	Dock Sud	11	(7)
1936	Tigre	5	(0)
1937–1938	All Boys	30	(21)
1939–1943	Temperley	133	(130)
1944–1946	Atlanta	74	(53)
1947	Ferro Carril Oeste	69	(53)
?	Danubio F.C.	30	(28)
- * Club domestic league appearances and goals

Luciano Eufemio Agnolín (20 October 1915 – 20 October 1986) was an Argentine footballer, notable for being the all-time leading goalscorer at the second level of Argentine football. Twice, he was a top 3 scorer in Argentine Division A. Agnolín started his playing career in 1935 with Dock Sud in the Ascenso Tournament (2nd level). In 1936, he joined Tigre in the Argentine Primera but did not adapt and returned to the Ascenso with All Boys. In 1939, he joined Club Atlético Temperley where he scored 130 goals in 133 games. His good form gave him another chance to play in the Primera. This time he would play with Club Atlético Atlanta where he scored 21 goals to become the third highest scorer behind Angel Labruna and Atilio Melone. In 1944, he scored for the club 53 goals in 74 games before returning to the Ascenso in 1947 with Ferro Carril Oeste. He then spent time in Uruguay playing for Danubio F.C. He also played a friendly in the Argentina national team.

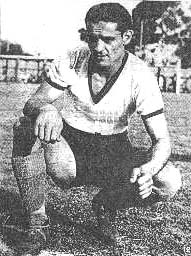
Agnolín at Temperley
