= Agnolo di Baccio d'Agnolo =

Italian architect

Agnolo di Baccio d’Agnolo was a 16th-century Italian architect. He built the Palazzo Campana in Villa Gaia, Tuscany.
