= Andrea Ciccione =

Italian architect and sculptor

- Born: 1388; Florence, Republic of Florence
- Died: 1455 (aged 66–67); Florence, Republic of Florence

Andrea Ciccione (1388–1455), also known as Andrea di Onofrio, Nofri, and da Firenze, was an Italian architect and sculptor of the Renaissance. He was born and died in Florence, but spent much of his career in Naples.

He trained under Masuccio the Younger. He completed the tomb of King Ladislaus of Naples at San Giovanni a Carbonara in Naples.
