= Diomede Carafa (died 1487) =

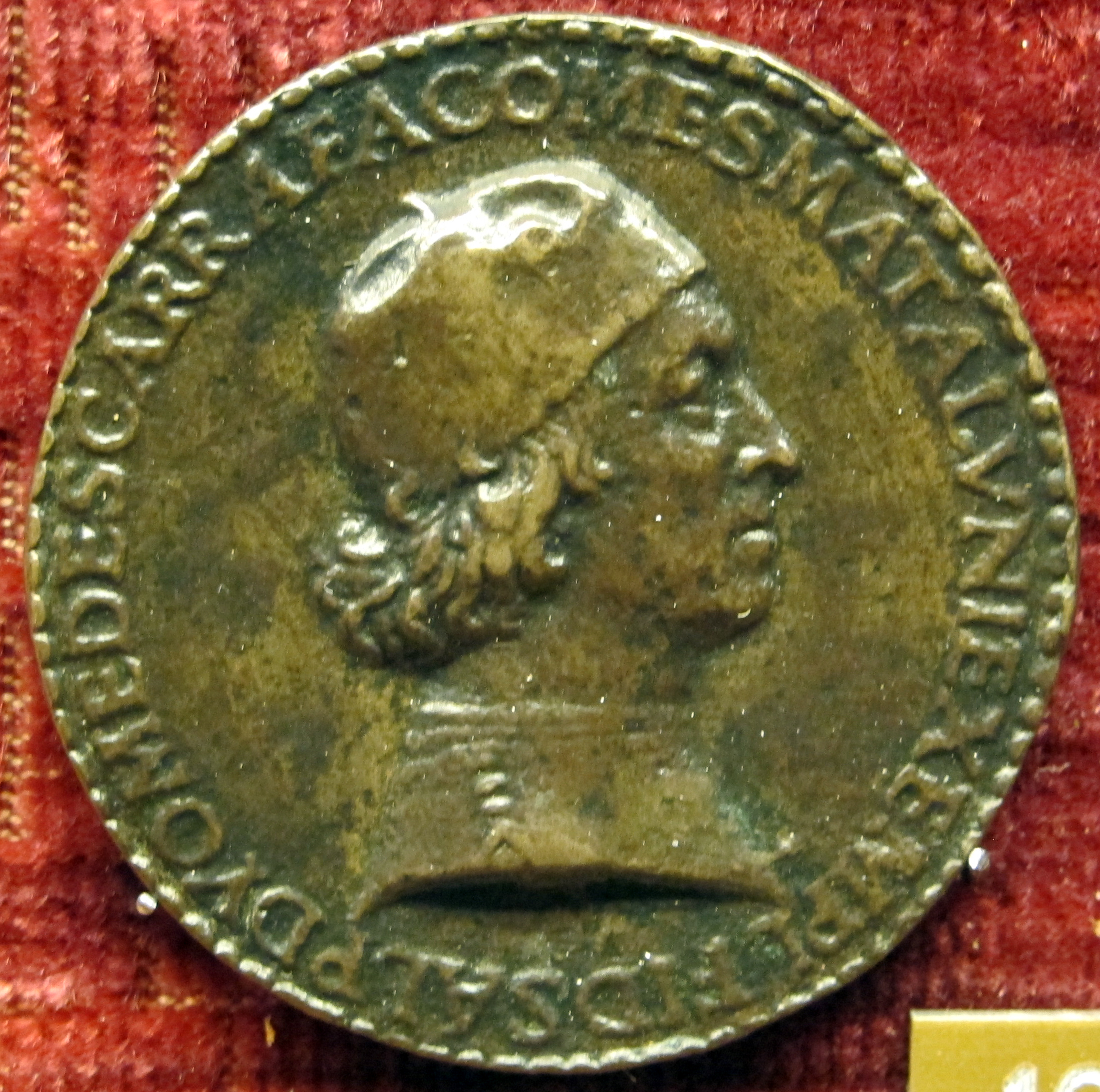
Medallion of Carafa, by Giovanni Candida

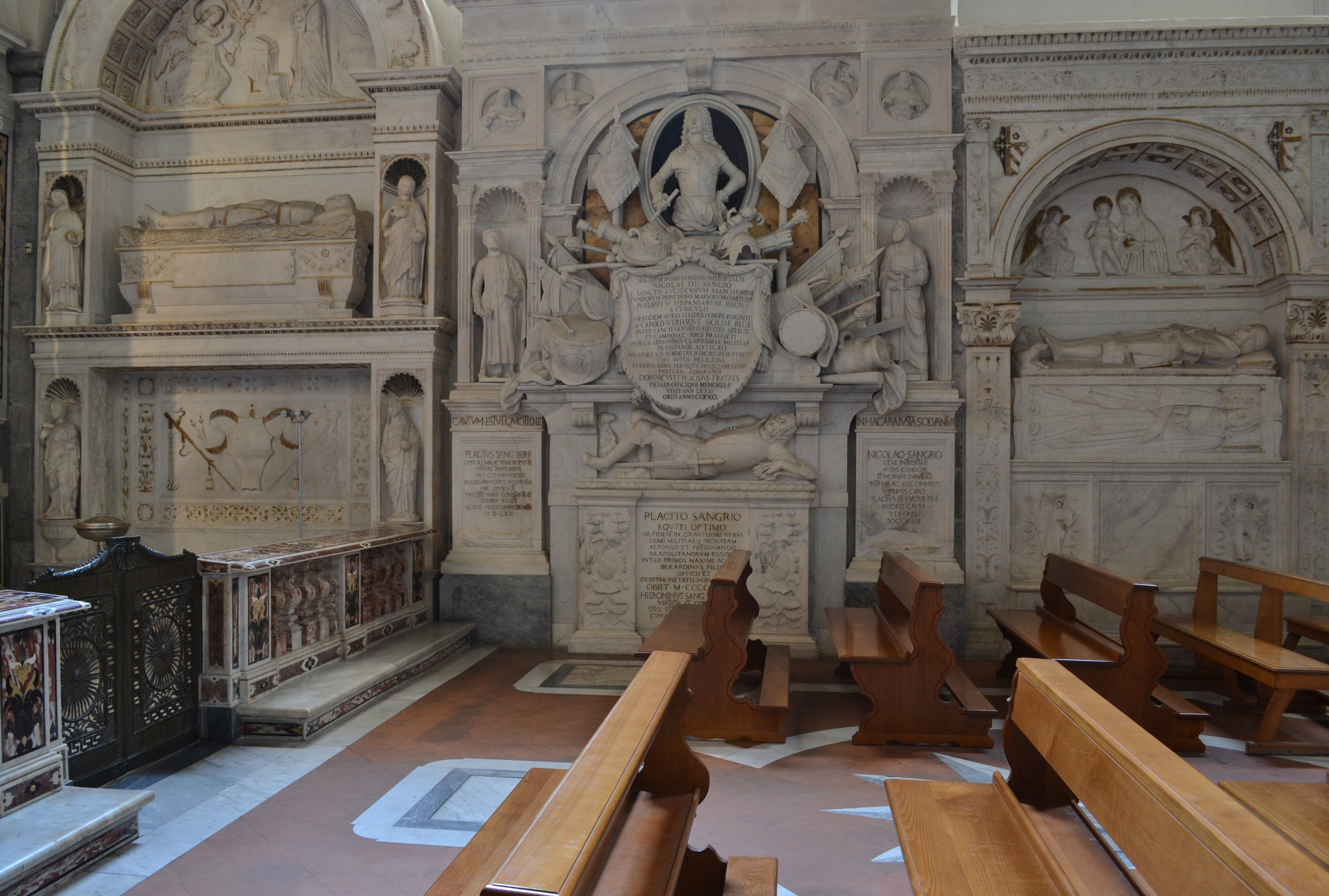
Tombs of the Carafas in the Chapel of the Crucifix. Diomede's tomb is on the left.

Diomede Carafa (c. 1407 – 17 May 1487) was a Neapolitan nobleman, soldier, diplomat and political theorist of the Carafa family.

== Life ==
Carafa was born in either 1406 or 1408, the youngest son of Antonio Malizia Carafa and Caterina Farafalla. Like his father, he was a staunch supporter of the House of Aragon. When Queen Joan II broke with her named heir, King Alfonso V of Aragon, Carafa followed Alfonso back to Spain. Nothing is known of what he did there, but he returned with Alfonso in 1442, when the latter conquered the kingdom. In February 1465, he was given a fief at Maddaloni with the title of count. The manuscript Reg. lat. 812 in the Vatican Library, containing Frontinus' Stratagems, was copied for Carafa by Pietro Ippolito da Luni.

Carafa died on 17 May 1487 and was buried in the Chapel of the Crucifix in San Domenico Maggiore. His tomb was the work of renowned sculptors Jacopo della Pila, Tommaso Malvito and Domenico Gagini.

== Works ==
Carafa wrote thirteen Memoriali in vernacular Neapolitan, some of which are lost and only one of which was published in his lifetime. They offer advice on finances, military matters and etiquette directed at members of the royal family and court. The surviving memoriali are:

- Memoriale ad Alfonso d'Aragona duca di Calabria (1467), military advice to Alfonso, Duke of Calabria.
- Memoriale in nome di Ferdinando primo re di Napoli ad Arrigo di Siviglia e di Toledo (1470), written in the name of Ferdinand I of Naples to Henry IV of Castile
- Memoriale alla serenissima regina de Ungheria (1476), practical advice for Ferdinand's daughter Beatrice on the occasion of her marriage to King Matthias Corvinus of Hungary
- Memoriale a Francesco d'Aragona (1476), written for Beatrice's brother, Francesco
- Memoriale (1478), written for Beatrice's other brother, Cardinal Giovanni d'Aragona, on the occasion of his Hungarian legation
- Memoriale per il capitano prudente (1479), more advice for the duke of Calabria following the Pazzi conspiracy
- Memoriale a Federico d'Aragona (1479), written for Alfonso's brother Frederick on the occasion of his move to France to marry Anne of Savoy
- Memoriale et recordo de quello have da fare la mulglyere per stare ad bene con suo marito et in che modo se have ab onestare, written at an unknown date for an unknown woman on the proper habits of a new wife for a happy marriage

The military Memoriali to Alfonso and Francesco were published by F. Campanile at Naples in 1608 under the title Gli ammaestramenti militari del signor Diomede Carafa. The Memoriale to Beatrice was translated into Latin by Colantonio Lentulo. A deluxe manuscript of the Latin version was copied by Giovan Marco Cinico and illustrated by Cola Rapicano.

Between 1472 and 1476, Carafa wrote a I doveri del principe, a treatise dedicated to Eleanor, Duchess of Ferrara. His last work, Libro delli precepti o vero instructione delli cortesani, was written in 1479 for his son, Giovanni Tommaso Carafa.

== Bibliography ==
- Abulafia, David (1995). "Ferrante of Naples: The Statecraft of a Renaissance Prince". History Today. 45: 19–25.
- Bentley, Jerry H. (1987). Politics and Culture in Renaissance Naples. Princeton University Press. doi:10.1515/9781400858811.
- Cappelli, Guido (2023). "Political Treatises". In Bianca de Divitiis (ed.). A Companion to the Renaissance in Southern Italy (1350–1600). Brill. pp. 358–382. doi:10.1163/9789004526372_016.
- Haywood, Eric (2002). "Carafa, Diomede". In Peter Hainsworth; David Robey (eds.). The Oxford Companion to Italian Literature. Oxford University Press.
- Guerra, Enrica (2016). "Carafa, Diomede". In Marco Sgarbi (ed.). Encyclopedia of Renaissance Philosophy. Springer. doi:10.1007/978-3-319-02848-4_188-1.
- Marucchi, Adriana (1974). "Note su un nuovo manoscritto Carafa scritto da Ippolito Lunense nel fondo Reginense". Revue d'Histoire des Textes (3–1973): 299–303.
- Michalsky, Tanja (2008). "The Local Eye: Formal and Social Distinctions in Late Quattrocento Neapolitan Tombs". Art History. 31 (4): 484–504. doi:10.1111/j.1467-8365.2008.00626.x.
- Moores, John D. (1971). "New Light on Diomede Carafa and His 'Perfect Loyalty' to Ferrante of Aragon". Italian Studies. 26 (1): 1–23. doi:10.1179/its.1971.26.1.1.
- Petrucci, Franca (1976). "Carafa, Diomede". Dizionario Biografico degli Italiani (in Italian). Vol. 19: Cappi–Cardona. Rome: Institute of the Italian Encyclopaedia. ISBN 978-88-12-00032-6.
