= Pietro Ippolito da Luni =

Italian royal scribe

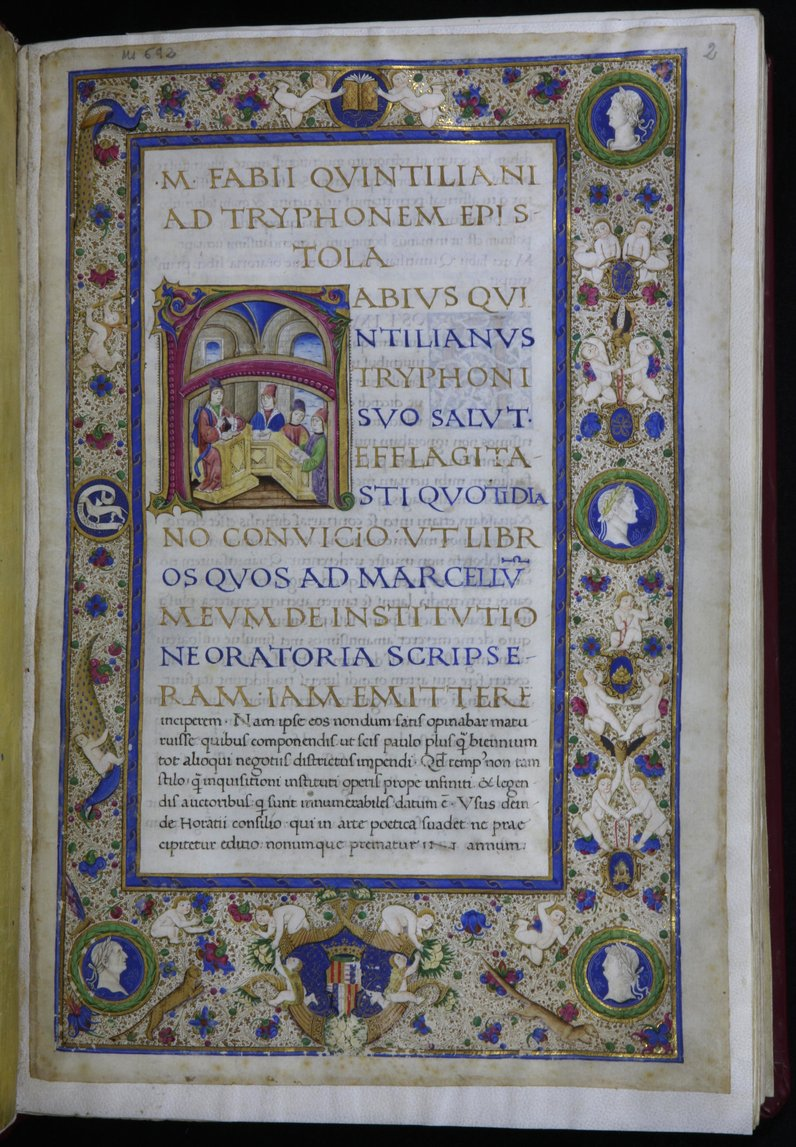
Valencia MS 692

Pietro Ippolito da Luni (Latin: Petrus Hippolytus Lunensis) was the royal scribe (librarius regius) of the Kingdom of Naples from 1472 to 1492. He was a native of the Lunigiana.

In 1473, Ippolito copied manuscripts 692 and 408 of the Biblioteca Històrica of the University of Valencia. Both were illuminated by Cola Rapicano and ended up in the library of Ferdinand, Duke of Calabria. In 1491–1493, in collaboration with the illuminator Matteo Felice, Ippolito copied Harley 3481 and Harley 3482 of the British Library and Est. lat. 469 of the Biblioteca Estense for King Ferdinand I.

Besides his work for the royal court, Ippolito copied manuscripts for several members of the Carafa family. He copied the manuscript Reg. lat. 812 for Count Diomede Carafa; Vat. lat. 7230 for the count's son, Giovan Tommaso Carafa; Vat. lat. 3551 for Cardinal Oliviero Carafa; and Vat. lat. 3297 for the cardinal's nephew, Bernardino Carafa. All these manuscripts are now in the Vatican Library.

In addition to a copyist, Ippolito was a scholar and translator. He sometimes engaged in sophisticated textual criticism. According to his notice, he edited the text of Marsilio Ficino's translations of Plato in Harley 3481. A similar note appears in Reg. lat. 1792.

Between about 1491 and 1492, Ippolito created an anthology of philosophical sayings drawn from works he had copied, translating them from Latin into Tuscan. Entitled Auree Sententie e Proverbi Platonici, this anthology is founded in Naples, Biblioteca Nazionale, XII E 32, where it is illustrated by Felice. It may be a presentation copy for an unknown patron. The manuscript XII E 31 contains a lapidarium translated by Ippolito for the courtier Aloysio Corellio.
