= Cristoforo Majorana =

Italian painter

Cristoforo Majorana (flourished c. 1480–94) was an Italian limner and painter. He was born in Naples, Italy. Majorana trained under Cola Rapicano. He produced work for Ferdinand of Aragon, Giovanni d'Aragona and Andrea Matteo Acquaviva. His work is held in the collections of the Walters Art Museum, National Library of France and the Fitzwilliam Museum.

== Notable works ==
- St. Augustine, Commentary on the Psalms, 1480
- Aesop, Fables, 1481
- Virgil, Aeneid, Eclogues, and Georgics, 1482-94
- Ptolemy, Geography

== Gallery ==
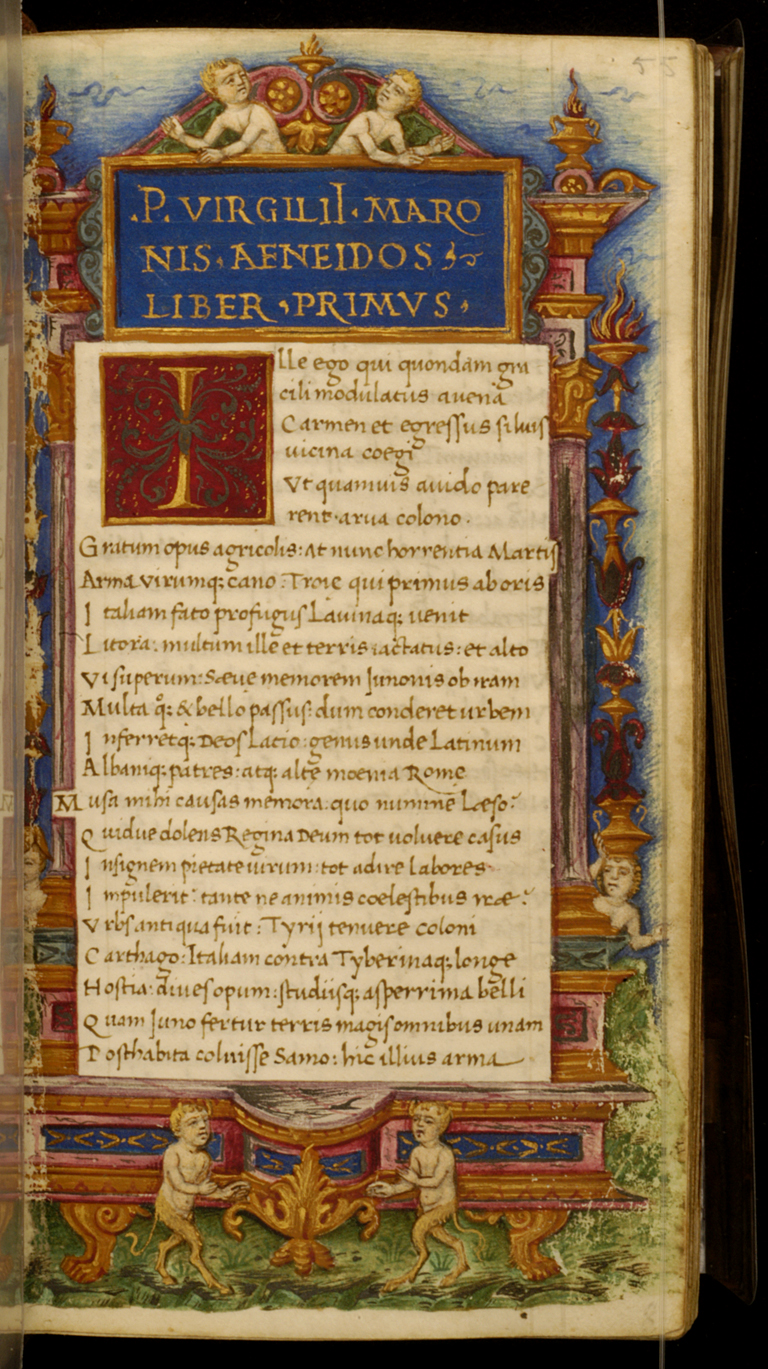
Leaf from Eclogues, Georgics and Aeneid, ca. 1470
