= Vignali =

Vignali may refer to:

== People ==
- Dario Vignali, British cancer immunologist
- Andrea Vignali, Italian footballer
- Carlos Vignali, American drug trafficker
- Jacopo Vignali (1592–1664), Italian painter
- Julia Vignali (born 1975), French actress and television presenter
- Luca Vignali (born 1996), Italian football midfielder
- Luigi Vignali, an Italian writer, television and theater author of the duo Gino & Michele
- Marcelo Vignali, Disney studios, art
- Louis Vignali, Engineer, inventor

== Animals ==
- Chrysallida vignali, species of sea snail
- Gibberula vignali, species of very small sea snail
- Joculator vignali, species of minute sea snail, a marine gastropod mollusc in the family Cerithiopsidae
