= Antonio Malizia Carafa =

15th-century Neapolitan nobleman

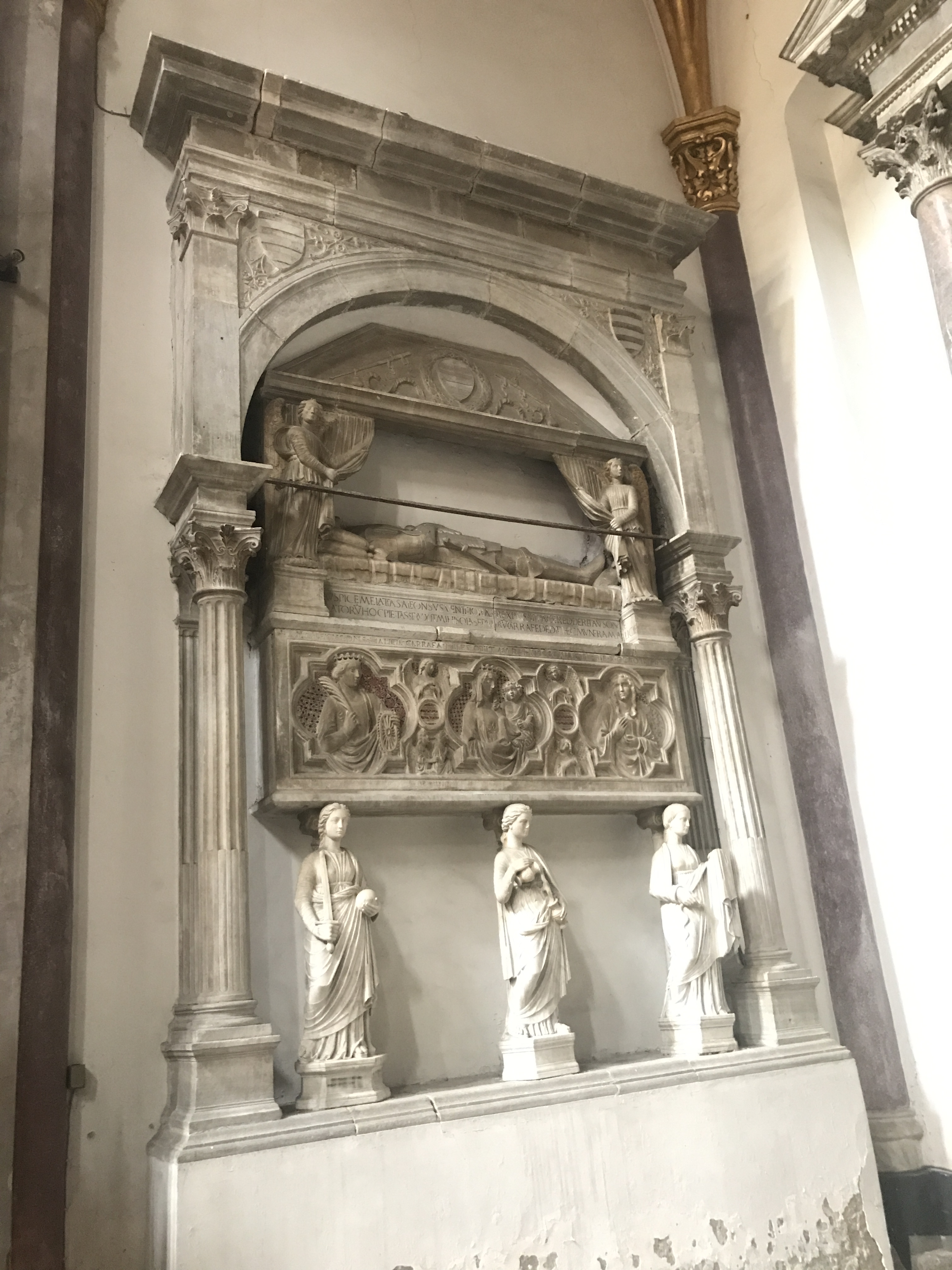
Funerary monument of Antonio Malizia Carafa

Antonio Carafa (died 10 October 1437/8), called Malizia ("the crafty"), was a nobleman and diplomat of the Kingdom of Naples. In the conflict between the Durazzo and Valois over the throne, he supported the Durazzo. He played a major role in the creation of the Aragonese claim to the throne and was a staunch supporter of King Alfonso V of Aragon until his death.

== Life ==
=== Durazzo–Valois conflict ===
Carafa was born around the middle of the 14th century. His father was Giovannello Carafa and his mother Mariella Mariscalchi. He had three brothers: Niccolò, Tommaso and Gurrello. He married Caterina Farafalla and had seven sons and two daughters: Carlo, Francesco, Tommaso, Antonio, Gurrello, Giovanni Battista, Diomede, Caterina and Diana. Cardinal Oliviero Carafa and Archbishop Alessandro Carafa were sons of Francesco.

In 1384, with his brother Gurrello, Carafa fought for King Charles III against a challenger to the throne, Duke Louis I of Anjou. On 20 December 1392, he was part of the council that declared Charles's successor, Ladislaus, to be of age. On 15 October 1394, he took part in a council convoked by Ladislaus to affirm the kingdom's support for Pope Boniface IX during the Western Schism.

In 1400, Ladislaus appointed Carafa justiciar of the province of Bari and granted him an annual pension from the customs revenue of the port of Bari. That year, he purchased land in Mercurion from the Countess Covella Gesualdo. In 1410, he and a cousin purchased the fiefs of Pescolanciano, Boccalino and Vignali with royal permission. In 1415, Queen Joan II confirmed his pension in Bari and appointed him captain of the territory of Montecassino. In 1417, she appointed him justiciar of the Valle di Crati and Terra Giordana. In 1419, Carafa purchased the casali of Cupuli and Casacellola from the Origlia count of Caiazzo. In 1420, he was named castellan of Torre del Greco.

=== Aragonese intervention ===
In April 1420, Carafa was part of a Neapolitan embassy (Note: The other ambassadors were Francesco de Riccardis, Ugo di Moliterno and Pasquale di Campli.) to Pope Martin V, who supported the claim of Duke Louis III of Anjou to the throne. They travelled by sea to Pisa and met the pope in Florence. There, Carafa opened negotiations with the Aragonese ambassador, García Aznar de Añón. Returning to Naples without papal permission, he informed the queen and of the possibility of an alliance with Aragon and was sent to Sardinia to meet with Alfonso V. (Note: This is according to Franca Petrucci. According to Alan Ryder, he went directly from Florence to Sardinia. Peter Partner considers it "unknown" if he went to Sardinia of his own accord or with permission from Naples. Petrucci names his fellow envoys to Alfonso as Giovanni Bozzuto, Bonifacio di Bonifacio, Pasquale di Campli and his nephew Caraffello Carafa.) He arrived during the siege of Bonifacio. Alfonso accepted the offer to become Joan's adopted heir and in return defend Naples from Louis. Later accounts emphasise the skill and persuasiveness of Carafa's appeal to Alfonso to come the aid of a lady in peril. On 6 August 1420 at Alghero, Alfonso granted Carafa an annual pension for his services. Carafa was present on 5 September, when Alfonso's ambassadors formalized the adoption in Naples.

On 1 April 1422, Carafa received the fief of Vico di Pantano from Joan. He was also by then a royal seneschal and household knight. That same year, Alfonso ceded him the revenues of the gabelle of the bailliage of Manco at Cosenza and the customs of the port of San Lucido. In 1423, Joan granted him the tax revenues of Vico di Pantano. In the fall of 1423, when the conflict between Joan and Alfonso spilled out into the open and she renounced the adoption, Carafa sided with Alfonso. When Alfonso opted to return to Spain, Carafa sent his son Diomede and his nephew Caraffello with him. In July 1424, when an Aragonese fleet arrived in Naples to support Alfonso's brother Peter, Carafa engineered riots in favour of the Aragonese. After the queen's victory, he fled to Sessa Aurunca.

=== Retirement and death ===
Carafa never abandoned the Aragonese cause. Joan died in 1435 and Alfonso immediately contested the succession with René of Anjou. Carafa died on 10 October 1437 or 1438 (Note: The day was 10 October, but authors differ as to the year, either 1437 or 1438. His tomb epitaph reads: Magnificus dominus Malicia Carrafa miles obiit anno Domini M°CCCCXXXVIII die X° octobris II^{e} indictionis.) and was buried in San Domenico Maggiore. In his testament, he encouraged his relatives to be faithful to the cause he had supported.

A monumental tomb was built for Carafa between the 1440s and 1480s, probably by the workshop of Jacopo della Pila on the orders of his son Diomede. An inscription commemorates its construction and celebrates Carafa as the man responsible for bringing Alfonso to Italy:

Thanks to me, Alfonso arrived on our coasts in order to bring peace to the Italians. Only the piety of his descendants is responsible for this tomb, and it is offered as a gift to Malizia.

== Citations ==
=== Works cited ===
- Hamel, Carmen Marie (2014). The Funerary Monuments of the Carafa Family: Self-Commemoration and Ecclesiastic Influence in Early-Renaissance Naples (MA thesis). Louisiana State University and Agricultural and Mechanical College.
- Michalsky, Tanja (2008). "The Local Eye: Formal and Social Distinctions in Late Quattrocento Neapolitan Tombs". Art History. 31 (4): 484–504. doi:10.1111/j.1467-8365.2008.00626.x.
- Norman, Diana (1989). The Patronage of Cardinal Oliviero Carafa, 1430–1511 (PhD thesis). The Open University.
- Partner, Peter (1958). The Papal State under Martin V: The Administration and Government of the Temporal Power in the Early Fifteenth Century. British School at Rome.
- Petrucci, Franca (1976). "Carafa, Antonio, detto Malizia". Dizionario Biografico degli Italiani (in Italian). Vol. 19: Cappi–Cardona. Rome: Institute of the Italian Encyclopaedia. ISBN 978-88-12-00032-6.
- Ryder, Alan F. C. (1976). The Kingdom of Naples under Alfonso the Magnanimous: The Making of a Modern State. Clarendon Press. ISBN 978-0-19-822535-5.
- Ryder, Alan F. C. (1990). Alfonso the Magnanimous: King of Aragon, Naples, and Sicily 1396–1458. Oxford University Press.
- Tufano, Luigi (2016). "L'epitaffio della tomba di Malizia Carafa (†1438) tra modelli culturali, propaganda politica e celebrazione familiare". Scrineum Rivista. 13: 1–48. doi:10.13128/Scrineum-19501. hdl:11574/228567.
