= Gioacchino de' Gigantibus =

15th-century Italian illuminator and copyist

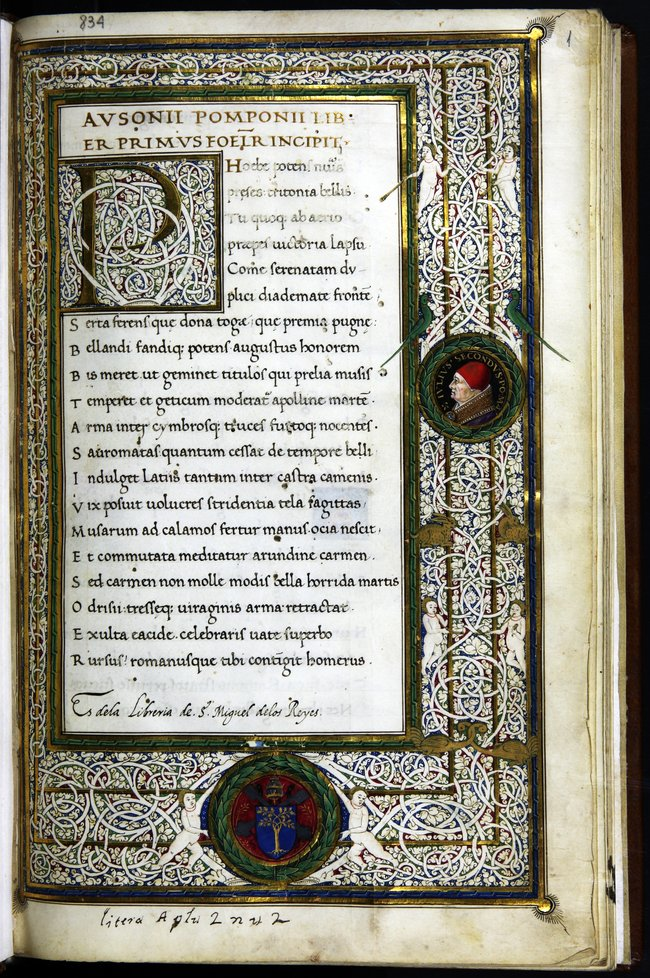
Page attributed to Gioacchino de' Gigantibus, in a manuscript made c. 1471–1484, today in the University of Valencia

Gioacchino de' Gigantibus or Gioacchino di Giovanni (fl. 1450–1485) was an illuminator, miniaturist and copyist active in Italy. Originally from Bavaria, he probably learned his trade in Florence. Around 1450 he moved to Rome, where he received commissions from high-ranking church officials. In his life, he would eventually work for six different popes. In the 1460s he also spent time in Siena, and moved to the court of Ferdinand I of Naples in Naples in 1471. In the early 1480s he returned to Rome, where he is mentioned for the last time in 1485.

The books decorated by Gioacchino de' Gigantibus are characterised by the profuse use of the white vine-stem decoration, a decorative element he helped popularise outside Florence; putti, birds and animals. He occasionally worked together with other artists. The preserved books decorated by Gioacchino are dispersed among different collections, including the Vatican Library, British Library and the French national library.

== Life ==
Gioacchino was born in Bavaria; his birthplace may have been Rothenburg ob der Tauber, but it has also been suggested that his epithet de' Gigantibus may be derived from the Nördlinger Ries, as the homonym Riese in German means "Giant". He was probably taught his trade in Florence. His exact identity has been a matter of some confusion and uncertainty. The names Gioacchino de' Gigantibus, Gioacchino di Giovanni, Gioacchino di Alemagna and Giovanni Tudischino, or variants thereof, have all been identified with the same artist. Research made during the second half of the 20th century however indicates that at least Tudischino was another, different person.

Gioacchino probably learnt his trade as an illuminator and miniaturist in Florence, but moved to Rome sometime around 1450. The first work dated he is associated with is a copy of a book (Liber de contemplatione) donated by Bishop Domenico de Dominicis to Cardinal Juan de Torquemada and made between 1448 and 1453. (Note: Manuscript Vat. lat. 1057 of the Vatican Library) This volume contains a presentation miniature depicting the cardinal receiving the book, and rich white vine-stem decorations, typical for the books illuminated by Gioacchino de' Gigantibus. In Rome he worked on several books for high-ranking church officials, including for Jean Jouffroy, Cardinal Antonio de la Cerda and no less than four popes: Nicholas V, Callixtus III, Pius II and Paul II.

He stayed in Rome until 1471, but during the 1460s frequently also stayed in Siena, apparently both working for the papal court and the chapter of Siena Cathedral. Between 1465 and 1466 he seems to have stayed permanently in the city, but then returned to Rome. However, his services appears to have become less and less appreciated by the Papal court and in 1471 he left for Naples, where he was employed by King Ferdinand I of Naples. About 40 manuscripts survive from his time in Rome.

In Naples he was employed continuously at the court until at least 1480, and received a regular salary in addition to payments for single commissions. In 1481 he returned to Rome, where he once more worked for the pope, first Sixtus IV, and the last dated documents referring to his life are two payments for some miniatures by Innocent VIII, the sixth pope he worked for, effected in August and September of that year. After that, the traces of the artist vanish.

== Production ==
Gioacchino de' Gigantibus was active as an illuminator, miniaturist and as a scribe and copyist. His style is recognisable; the books illuminated by him are often profusely decorated with white vine-stem decorations, ribbons, putti with red coral necklaces, parrots and pairs of animals. In fact, through him the use of white vine-stem was popularised outside Florence, in Rome and Naples. Throughout his life his style shows few signs of innovation or extensive development, but he was technically skilled and productive. He also collaborated with several other artists on different projects, including Cola Rapicano and Bartolomeo Sanvito.

The preserved books decorated by Gioacchino de' Gigantibus are spread out over several collections. The Vatican Library, British Library, the French national library and the Victoria and Albert Museum all have books decorated by him.
