= Carafa =

Carafa is a surname held by:

- Tony Carafa, Australian rules footballer
- Members of the house of Carafa (Note: There are other people with the surname Carafa or Caraffa whose connection to the noble family of that name is undocumented. The surname was also misspelt or derogated to Caiafa and there are many families in Naples and the Campania region sharing that altered version of the surname.)

== See also ==
- Carafa Chapel
- Caraffa (disambiguation)
- Palazzo Carafa (disambiguation)
- Antonio Carafa
