= Palazzo Carafa =

Palazzo Carafa may refer to:

- Palazzo Diomede Carafa, monumental Renaissance palace of Naples, Italy
- Palazzo Carafa della Spina, historic palace located of Naples, Italy

== See also ==
- Carafa
