= Antonio Carafa =

Antonio Carafa may refer to:

- Antonio Malizia Carafa (died 1437)
- Antonio Carafa (cardinal) (1538–1591)
- Antonio Carafa (general) (1642–1693)
- Antonio Carafa (bishop of Ugento) (died 1704)
