= Alessandro Carafa =

Roman Catholic prelate

Most Reverend Alessandro Carafa
- Archbishop of Naples
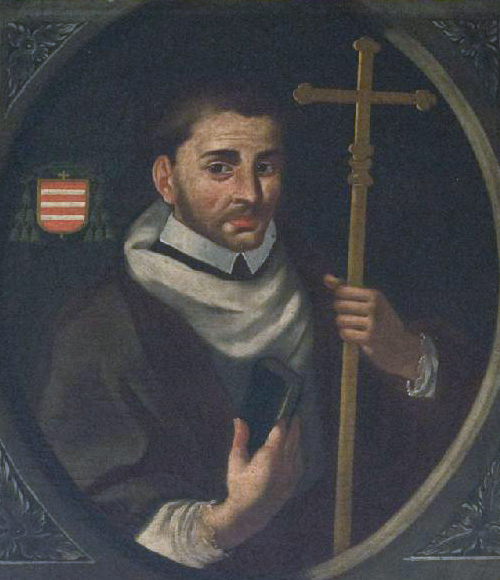
- Church: Catholic Church
- Archdiocese: Archdiocese of Naples
- In office: 1484–1503
- Predecessor: Oliviero Carafa
- Successor: Oliviero Carafa

Personal details
- Died: 31 July 1503 Naples, Italy

Alessandro Carafa (died 31 July 1503) was a Roman Catholic prelate who served as Archbishop of Naples from 20 September 1484 until his death. He was a son of Francesco, second son of Antonio Malizia Carafa, and a brother of Cardinal Oliviero Carafa.

A member from the Carafa della Stadera branch, son of Francesco and Maria Origlia, he was likely born in 1430. Having embraced an ecclesiastical career, he became a canon and apostolic protonotary. He was living in Rome with his brother Oliviero, cardinal and archbishop of Naples, when on September 20, 1484, Oliviero resigned the archbishopric in his favor, reserving the right of return. Leaving Rome in the following October, he entered Naples on December 22, welcomed by the city clergy and received upon his arrival by the Duke of Calabria himself.

The Carafa, who resided mainly at his archiepiscopal seat, carried out his duties as a prelate by addressing the religious issues of his diocese—he approved, along with the chapter, the Constitutiones Synodales Iohannis [Orsini] archiepiscopi Neapolitani in 1489 and oversaw their publication—and by participating in all public events affecting the monarchy and the Kingdom.

When King Ferdinand fell ill in 1485, while opposition from rebellious barons was mounting against him, Carafa promoted public prayers, culminating in a procession, to implore the sovereign’s recovery.

On May 17, 1487, the famous and powerful Diomede Carafa, Carafa's uncle, near death, made his will, appointed the sovereign and the Duke of Calabria as executors, and named Carafa as the custodian. In 1490, he presided over the funeral ceremony held in the Naples Cathedral in memory of Matthias Corvinus, the king’s son-in-law, a month after his death. Naturally, he also participated in the funeral of Ferdinand, who died on January 25, 1494, following the casket alongside Alfonso, whom he blessed in the cathedral, and attended Alfonso's coronation a few months later, on May 8.

Between one event and the other, Carafa had been sent by Alfonso II to Rome together with the Marquis of Gerace, the Count of Potenza, and Antonio di Alessandro, to officially request from Alexander VI the remission of overdue payments. In reality, their mission was to secure a stance in favor of the new Aragonese king from the pope, who indeed sent his legate to place the crown on Alfonso's head.

On January 23 of the following year, as the Aragonese monarchy was about to collapse in the face of Charles VIII's forces, Ferrante II, who had succeeded his father after his abdication, crossed Naples at the head of a procession and, upon reaching the cathedral, received the blessing from the Neapolitan archbishop. On May 3 of the same year, Charles VIII, having entered Naples unopposed on February 22, participated in the rite of the liquefaction of St. Januarius' blood, in the presence of Carafa, who obtained from him the confirmation of the privileges enjoyed by the Church of Naples under the Aragonese.

After the French interlude, which was not yet entirely concluded, Ferrante II returned to Naples on July 7, 1495. Following his victory at Atella, Ferrante, gravely ill, was transported to Naples on October 5, 1496; on October 6, Carafa organized a procession for his health. However, after the sovereign died the next day, his uncle Frederick came to the capital. Acclaimed king by the barons, Frederick went to the cathedral and took the oath in Carafa's hands.

On January 13 of the following year, while Naples was ravaged by the plague, Carafa performed the solemn transfer of the relics of St. Januarius from the Monastery of Montevergine, where his brother Oliviero was commendatory abbot, to the cathedral. Shortly after, the archbishop oversaw the printing of the "Proprium" or Missal of the patron saints of Naples (a rare copy is preserved in the Diocesan Historical Archive of Naples, location XIII).

No further information is available about him until his death in Rome on July 31, 1503. In 1508, his body found a permanent resting place in the chapel of the "succorpo" in the Naples cathedral, erected by his brother Oliviero to house the relics of St. Januarius.

Catholic Church titles
Preceded by Oliviero Carafa	Archbishop of Naples; 1484–1503	Succeeded by Oliviero Carafa
