= Caraffa =

Caraffa may refer to:

- Caraffa del Bianco, municipality in the Province of Reggio Calabria in the Italian region Calabria of southern Italy
- Caraffa di Catanzaro, town and comune in the province of Catanzaro in the Calabria region of southern Italy
- Caraffa Fine Arts Museum, an art museum in Córdoba, Argentina

== People ==
- Antonio Caraffa, General Commissary of the Imperial-Habsburg Army
- Emilio Caraffa, Argentine painter of the post-impressionist school
- Girolamo Caraffa, general in Spanish and Imperial service from Italian descent

== See also ==
- Carafa
