= Palazzo Diomede Carafa =

Renaissance palace in Italy

Coordinates: 40.848845°N 14.256888°E

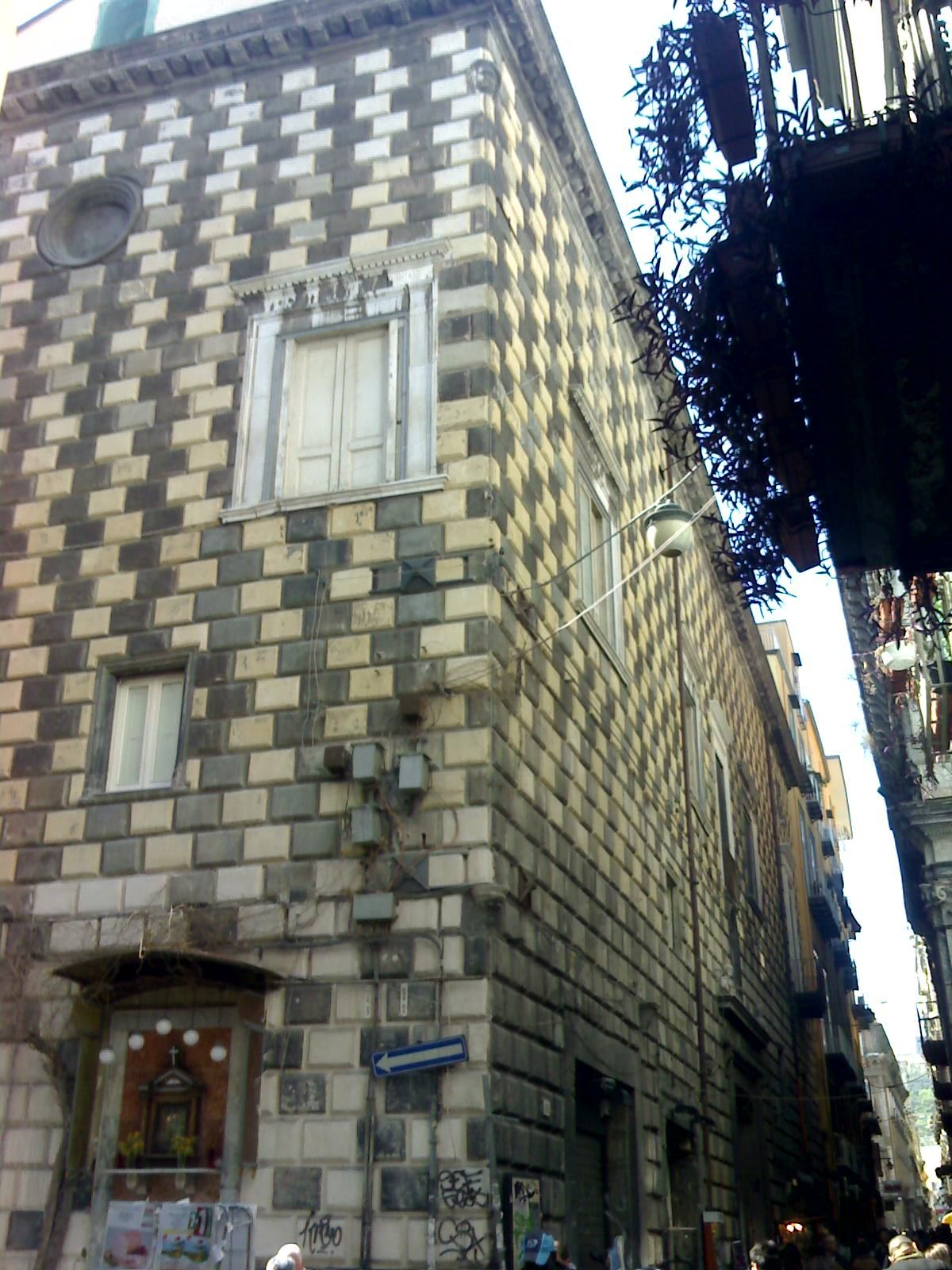
- The façade of Palazzo Diomede Carafa
- Interactive map of the Palazzo Diomede Carafa area

The Palazzo Diomede Carafa, also known as Palazzo Santangelo, or Santagelo Carafa, is a monumental Renaissance palace on Via San Biagio dei Librai #119–121 in central Naples, region of Campania, Italy. Across the street from the facade is the church of San Nicola a Nilo; on the Eastern flank, across a vicolo of the same name, is the church of Santi Filippo e Giacomo.

== History ==
The palace was first built in the 15th century and restored soon after. A plaque, dated 1466, recalled work by the owner Diomede Carafa. It is said he engaged the architect Masuccio Secondo or Angelo Aniello Fiore in this work. The latter worked for the family tombs in the church of San Domenico. The palace passed from the son of Diomede, to the Counts of Maddaloni, and then the Carafa family of Columbrano. After the death of the Duchess Faustina Pignatelli, wife of Francesco Carafa di Columbrano, the palace fell into disrepair, until acquired in 1815 by Francesco Santangelo, a wealthy lawyer, and converted into a museum displaying archeologic collections.

The palace has twelve faded niches depicting members of the Carafa lineage. The upper stories have a pattern of alternating colored stone.

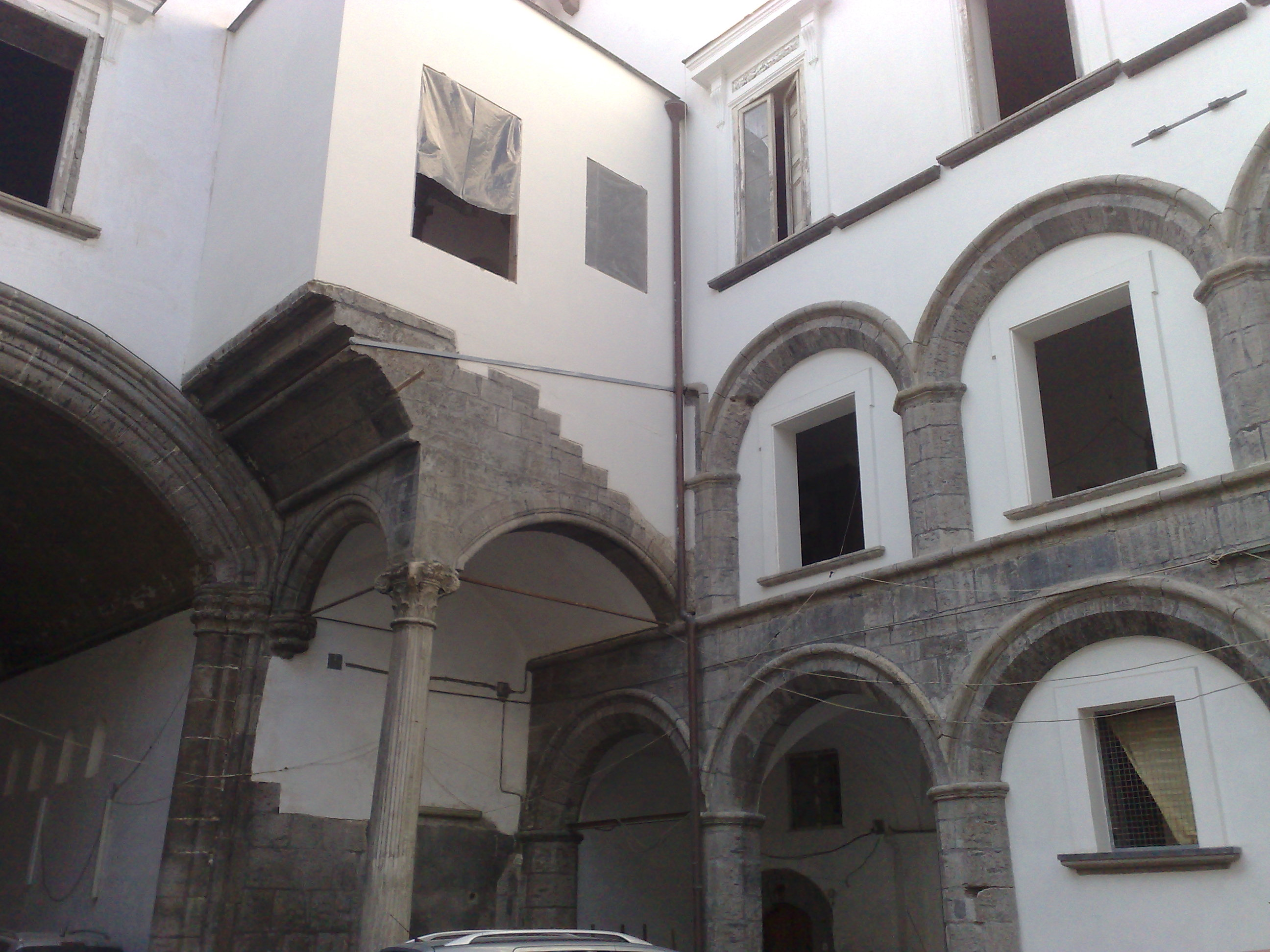
Internal courtyard

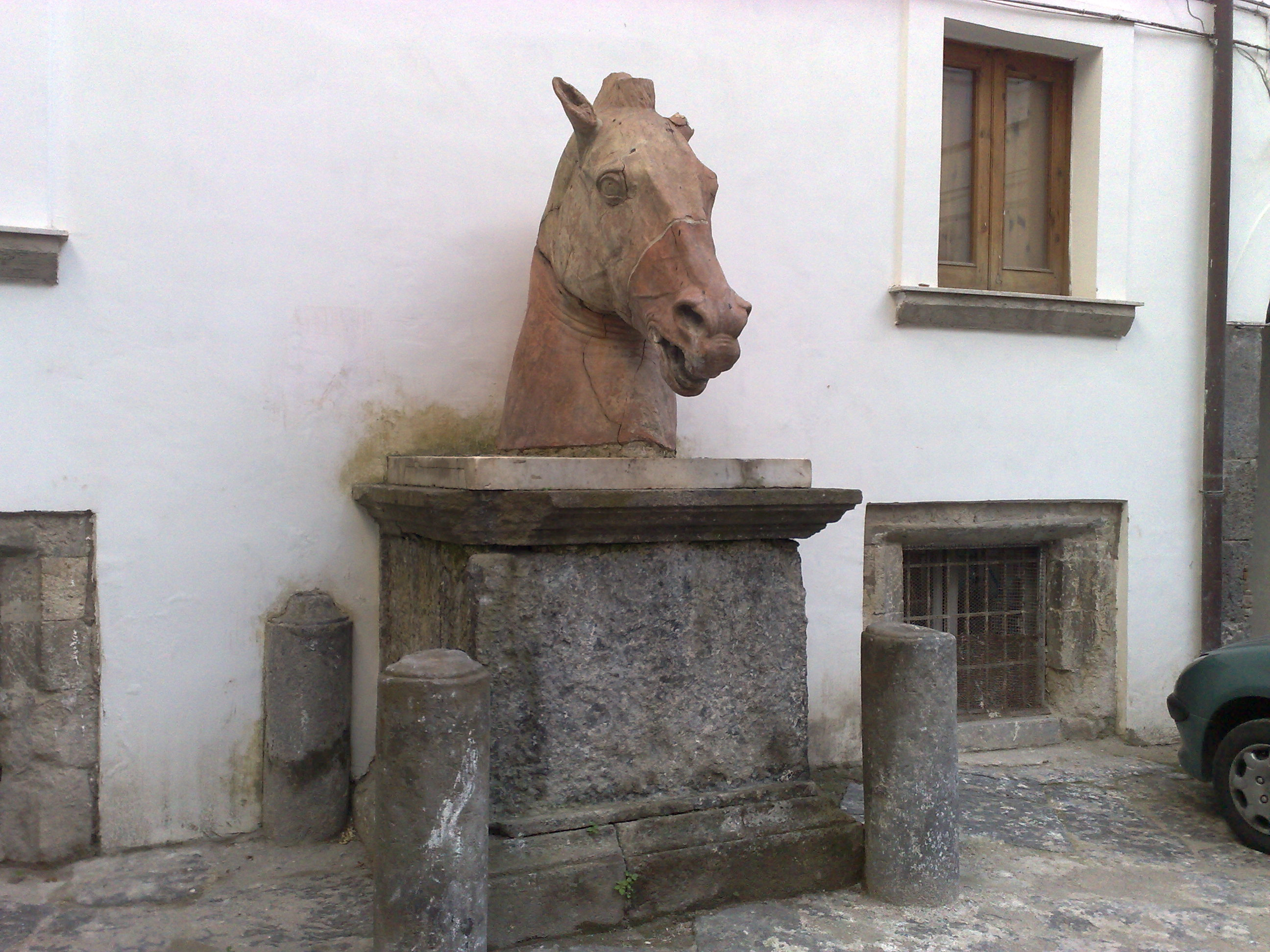
Horse head sculpture of courtyard

== See also ==
- San Nicola a Nilo, a Baroque-style Roman Catholic church
