= San Nicola a Nilo =

- Chiesa di San Nicola a Nilo
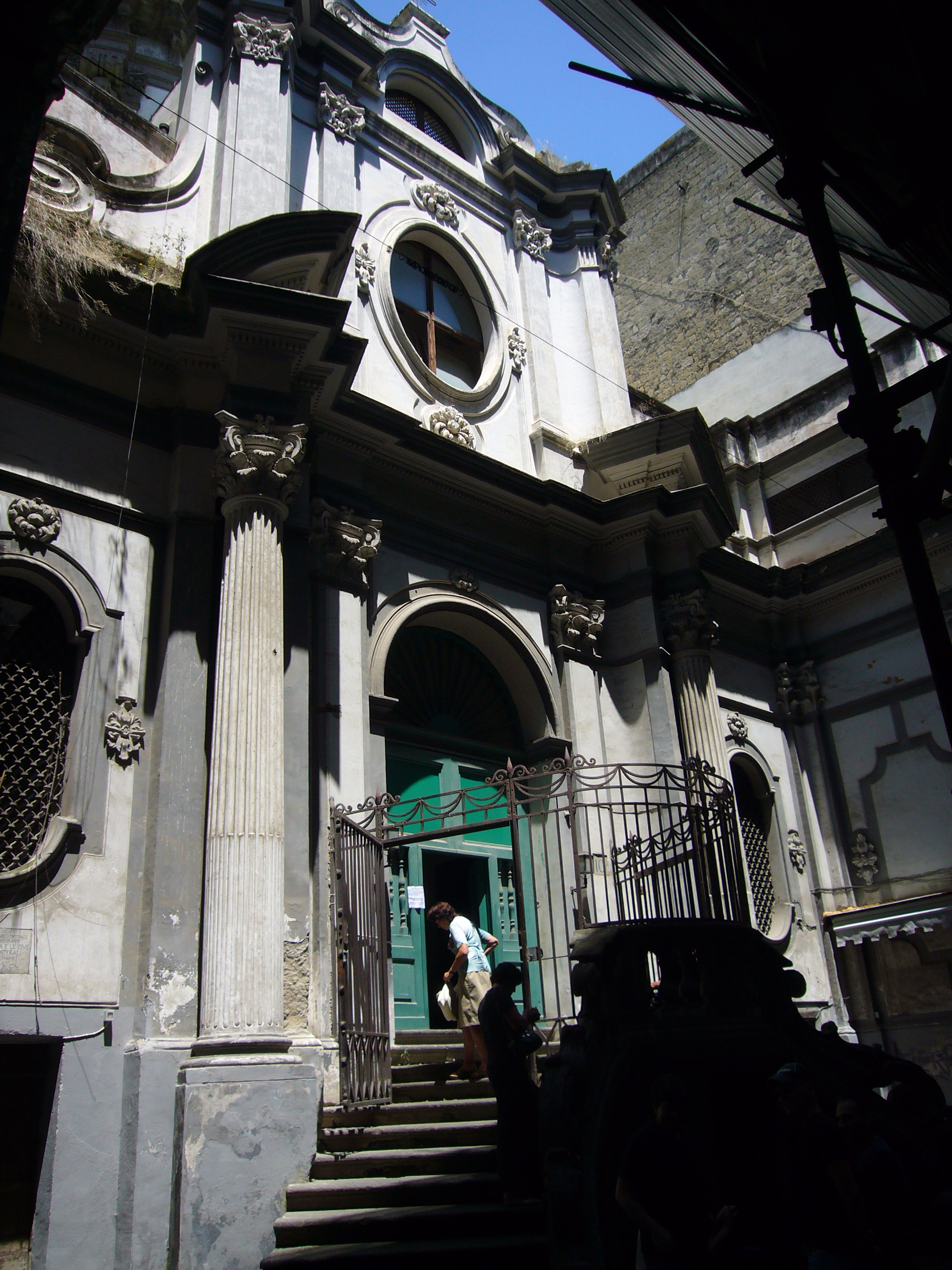
- Facade of the church of San Nicola a Nilo, Naples.
- San Nicola a Nilo
- 40.849080°N 14.256765°E
- Location: Naples
- Country: Campania
- Denomination: Roman Catholic Church

History
- Founded: 1705
- Dedicated: 1705

Architecture
- Style: Baroque architecture

San Nicola a Nilo is a Baroque-style Roman Catholic church on Via San Biagio dei Librai #10, in the center of Naples, province of Campania, Italy. It stands across from the Palazzo Diomede Carafa.

== History ==
After Masaniello's revolution of 1647, the pharmacist Sabato Anella took pity on the many children orphaned in the upheavals, and created an orphanage at his home near Sedile di Porto. Thereafter the Count of Oñate, then Viceroy, obtained a building at this site from the Marquis of Mari. A church and adjacent oratory-church were built, and supervised by a monastic order. The church was dedicated to St Nicolas, Bishop of Myra, patron of orphans and grocers.

The children boarded there had to live by a monastic rule. Over time, the house was transformed into a monastery open to youngsters from wealthy families. In 1705, the church we see now was built using a design by Giuseppe Lucchesi. After the Irpinia earthquake of 1980, the complex was abandoned and given to the Community of Sant'Egidio. The church has a central Greek cross plan with a circular room, decorated in baroque style with Corinthian columns.
