= White vine-stem =

Illuminated manuscript decoration

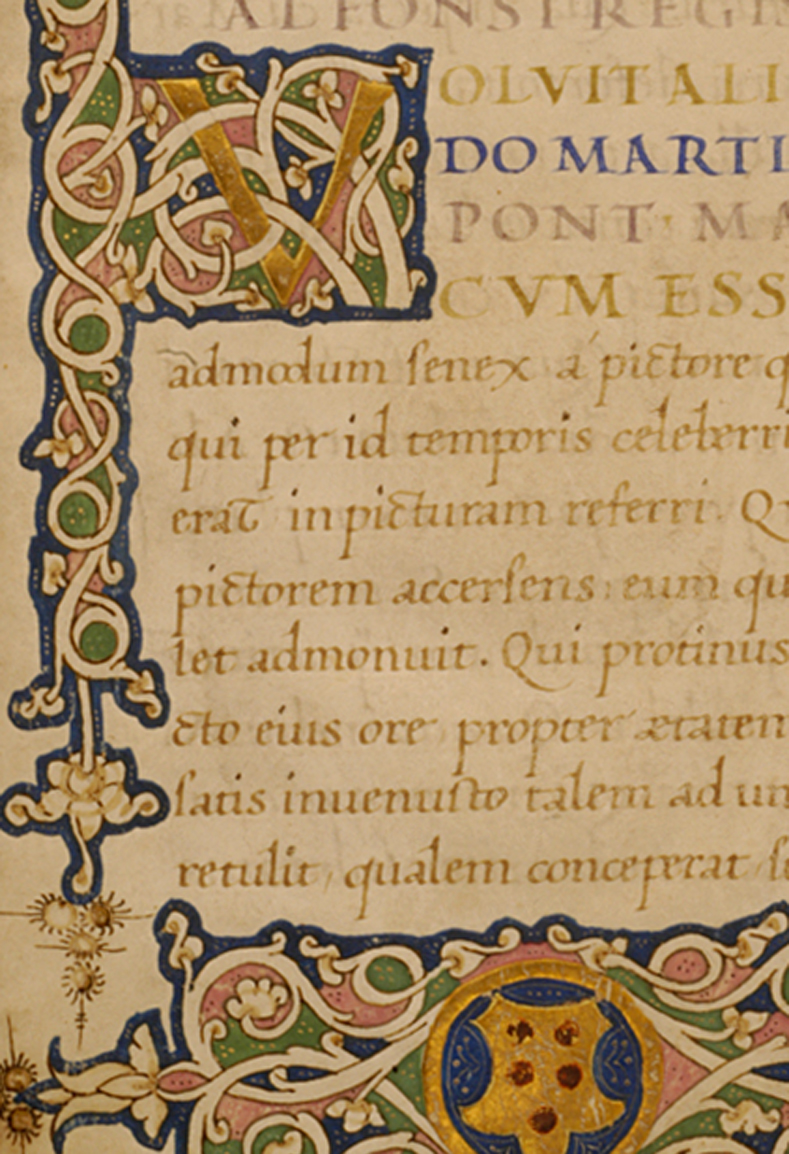
White vine-stems, left and down, decorate the margins and the initial V of this page in Life of Alphonso VI, King of Aragon and Naples, an Italian manuscript from c. 1460.

A white vine-stem or white vine is a kind of border or initial decoration found in illuminated manuscripts and incunabula. Sometimes the Italian term bianchi girari is also used in English.

The decoration consists of entangled white vines, usually contrasted with a colourful background. The stems themselves are often simply parchment left unpainted. It became popular among Florentine illuminators in the early 15th century, as a conscious imitation of forms found in Romanesque illuminated manuscripts, thought at the time to be antique forms. For this reason, it was considered suitable to use white vine-stems to decorate texts by classical authors and humanist books. From Florence the use of white vine-stems as a decorative element later spread to Rome and Naples, not least through the prolific work of Gioacchino de’ Gigantibus, during the second half of the century.
