= Jacopo della Pila =

Italian sculptor

- Born: Jacopo della Pila c. 1400; Milan
- Died: c. 1500; Naples
- Known for: Sculpture
- Movement: Early Renaissance

Jacopo della Pila was an Italian Early Renaissance sculptor.

== Biography ==
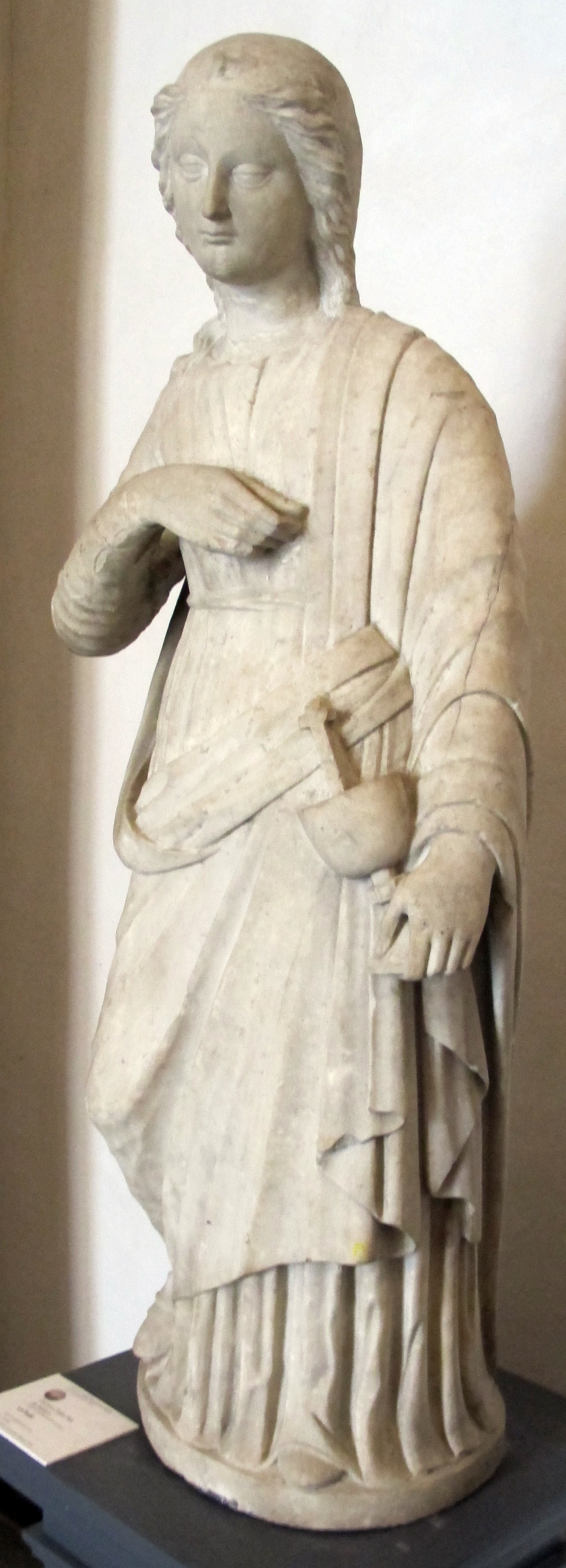
Jacopo della Pila, Allegoria della Fede, Museo di San Martino, Naples

No documentary sources have survived regarding the early life of Jacopo della Pila, one of the most important Italian sculptors of the late 15th and early 16th centuries, except that he undoubtedly had Milanese origins. His activity is documented in the Kingdom of Naples between 1471 and 1502, after a probable Roman education. To date, nothing is known of any work della Pila conducted in his homeland prior to his move to Naples. He was part of that fervent and populous colony of Lombard sculptors who settled in Naples in the second half of the fifteenth century, within which other notable personalities stand out such as Domenico Gagini, Pietro di Martino from Milan, Francesco di Cristofano from Milan, Tommaso Malvito from Como and his son Giovan Tommaso Malvito. The date of della Pila's death is unknown.

== Artistic activity ==
His first major work is the "Monumento funebre del vescovo Nicola Piscicelli" in the Salerno Cathedral, dated 1471, which already features a compositional scheme that the sculptor would replicate several times and which revived the fourteenth-century tradition, quite common in Neapolitan production of the period: a tomb resting on three small pillars supported by the three Virtues (Faith, Hope, and Charity), signs of the deceased's earthly merit, while on the coffin, three garlands surround Saint Matthew, the Madonna and Child, and Saint Mark

In 1473 the Lombard master was in the service of King Ferrante, for whom he executed some fountains (lost). The tombs of Garzia Cavaniglia and Antonio Carafa known as "il Malizia" for the Neapolitan churches of Church of Sant'Anna dei Lombardi and Church of San Domenico Maggiore, as well as that of Diego I Cavaniglia in the Convent of San Francesco a Folloni, dated 1481, belong to the immediately following period. The date of construction of the tomb of Costantino Castriota in the Church of Santa Maria la Nova in Naples is uncertain, as is, also in 1481, the beautiful Eucharistic tabernacle in the chapel of Santa Barbara in Castel Nuovo, of a delicacy that would not have displeased even Domenico Gagini

In 1494, Niccolò di Alagno commissioned a tomb for the castle of Torre Annunziata, modeled on Pietro Brancaccio's tomb in the Church of Sant'Angelo a Nilo in Naples. This tomb, currently in its current state, features the typological variant of the absence of the Virtues and its placement within an architectural aedicule.

His interest in classical sculpture is evident in the tabernacle for the Cappella di Santa Barbara in Castel Nuovo, a work from the 1480s. Between 1492 and 1500, he created the "Tomba di Tommaso Brancaccio" in San Domenico Maggiore in Naples, repeating the scheme with the tomb held by the three Virtues

== Major works ==
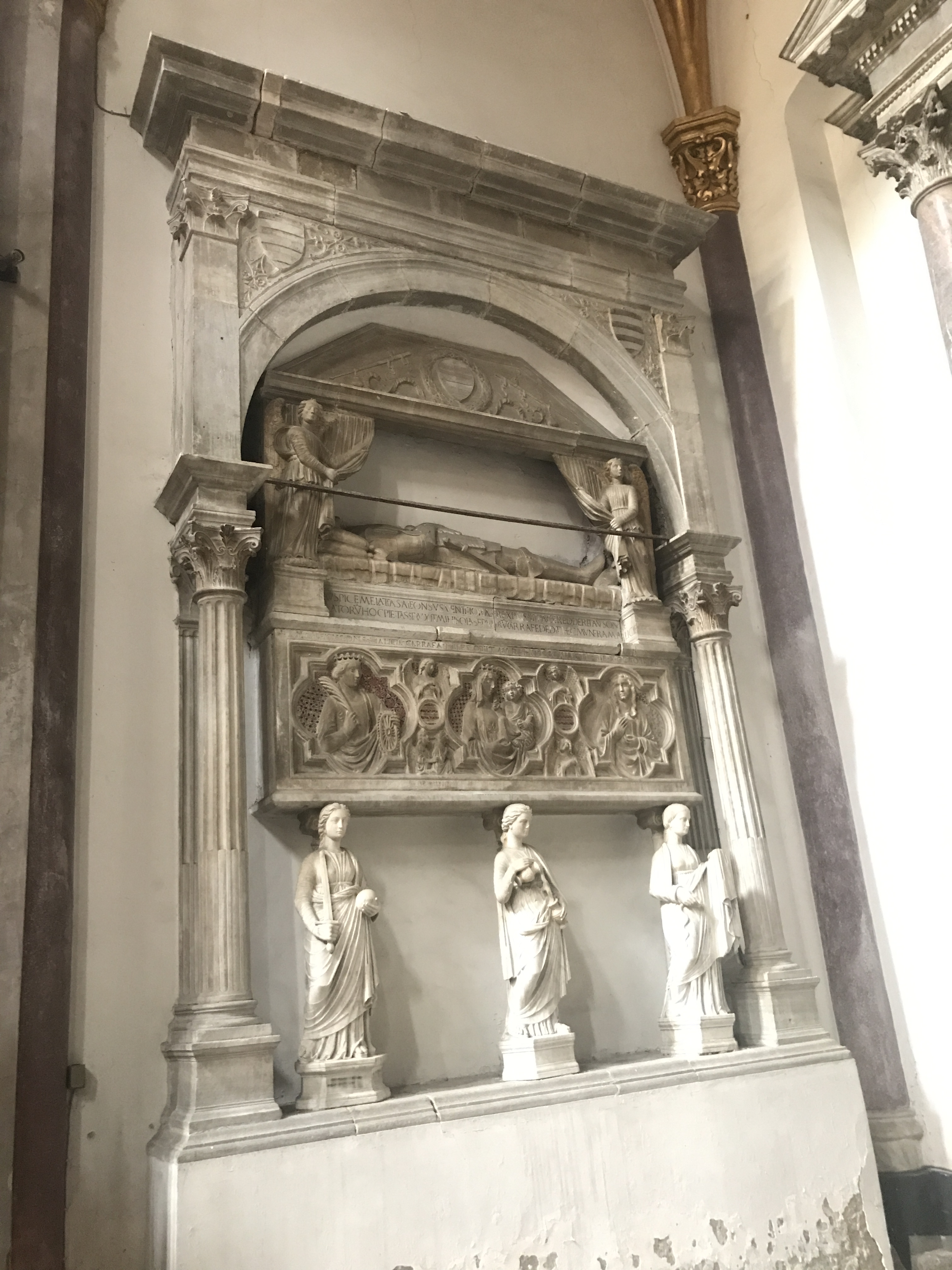
Jacopo della Pila, Monumento di Antonio Carafa, detto Il Malizia, San Domenico Maggiore, Chapel of St. John the Evangelist, Naples

- Tomb of Matteo Ferrillo, Santa Maria La Nova, Naples
- Virgin of the Annunciation, Ackland Art Museum
- Allegory of Temperance, The Metropolitan Museum of Art
- Eucharistic Tabernacle, Palatine Chapel of Castel Nuovo
- Madonna and Child, Church of Santa Maria delle Grazie on Piazza Cavour, Naples
- Allegory of Temperance (reworked as Faith), National Museum of San Martino, Naples
- Ferrante I of Aragon on Horseback, National Museum of San Martino, Naples
- Virgin Annunciate, National Museum of San Martino, Naples
- Saint John the Baptist, Royal Holy House of the Annunciation, Naples
- Funeral Monument of Nicola Piscicelli, Salerno Cathedral
- Annunciation, Diocesan Museum, Squillace (Catanzaro)
- Funeral Monument of Diego Cavaniglia, Church of San Francesco a Folloni, Avellino
- Funeral Monument of Tommaso Brancaccio, Church of San Domenico Maggiore, Chapel of San Domenico, Naples
- Funeral Monument of Antonio Malizia Carafa, Church of San Domenico Maggiore, Chapel of San Domenico, Naples
- Funeral Monument of Diomede Carafa, Church of San Domenico Maggiore, Chapel of San Domenico, Naples
- Funeral Monument of Pietro Brancaccio, Church of Sant'Angelo a Nilo, Naples

== Bibliography ==
- R. Leppien, Die neapolitanische Skulptur des späteren Quattrocento. Inaugural-Dissertation zur Erlangung des Doktorgrades einer Hohen Philosophischen Fakultät der Eberhard-Karls-Universität zu Tübingen, I, 1960, pp. 56–156, 266-287
- F. Negri Arnoldi, La scultura del Quattrocento e del Cinquecento, in Storia e civiltà della Campania. Il Rinascimento e l'età barocca, a cura di G. Pugliese Carratelli, Napoli 1994, p. 150
- F. Abbate, Storia dell'arte nell'Italia meridionale. Il Sud angioino e aragonese, Roma 1998, pp. 203, 210
- R. Naldi, Due Virtù, e qualche notizia di Iacopo della Pila, in Percorsi di conoscenza e di tutela. Studi in onore di Michele D’Elia, a cura di F. Abbate, Napoli 2008, pp. 111–126
- R. Naldi, Musei vivi. Nuovi tesori per Napoli. Acquisizioni 2001-2010 ,Napoli 2011, a cura di F. Capobianco, Napoli 2011, pp. 18, n. 3, 66, n. 42
- A. Dentamaro, Ricerche su Jacopo della Pila e i suoi committenti, relatore prof. Francesco Caglioti, Università degli Studi di Napoli ‘Federico II’, a.a. 2011
- A. Dentamaro, Tabernacoli e altari eucaristici del Rinascimento in Campania, tesi di dottorato, XXVII ciclo, relatore prof. Francesco Caglioti, Università degli Studi di Napoli ‘Federico II’, a.a. 2014-2015
- A. Dentamaro, Qualche novità su Jacopo della Pila, con una digressione su alcune sculture napoletane nel Victoria and Albert Museum, in Prospettiva, 2017, Prospettiva, nn. 167-168, pp. 114–141
- R. Naldi, Aggiunte e proposte per Iacopo della Pila e il sepolcro di Giovanni Cavaniglia in Santa Maria di Monte Oliveto a Napoli, in Napoli Nobilissima, VI-I, 2020, pp. 5–15
