= Tommaso Malvito =

Italian sculptor

Tommaso Malvito (died 1508) was an Italian sculptor, known particularly for his work on funerary monuments in Naples at the turn of the fifteenth and sixteenth centuries.

He was born in Como (Lombardy) in the late 15th century, and was a pupil of the Milanese Pietro di Martino. From 1476 to 1483 he was in Marseille, where he worked under Francesco Laurana.

Malvito is mentioned for the first time as an autonomous artist in 1484, in his Naples workshop which he held until in 1508, together with his son Giovanni Tommaso Malvito. He worked with painter Francesco da Milano on the tomb of the prioress of the local convent of S. Sebastiano. In the 1490s he worked on the Cathedral of Naples crypt (Succorpo, commissioned by Cardinal Oliviero Carafa, though the statue there is generally attributed to Giovanni Tommaso), and the marble portal of Santissima Annunziata Maggiore.
