= Cola Rapicano =

Italian illuminator

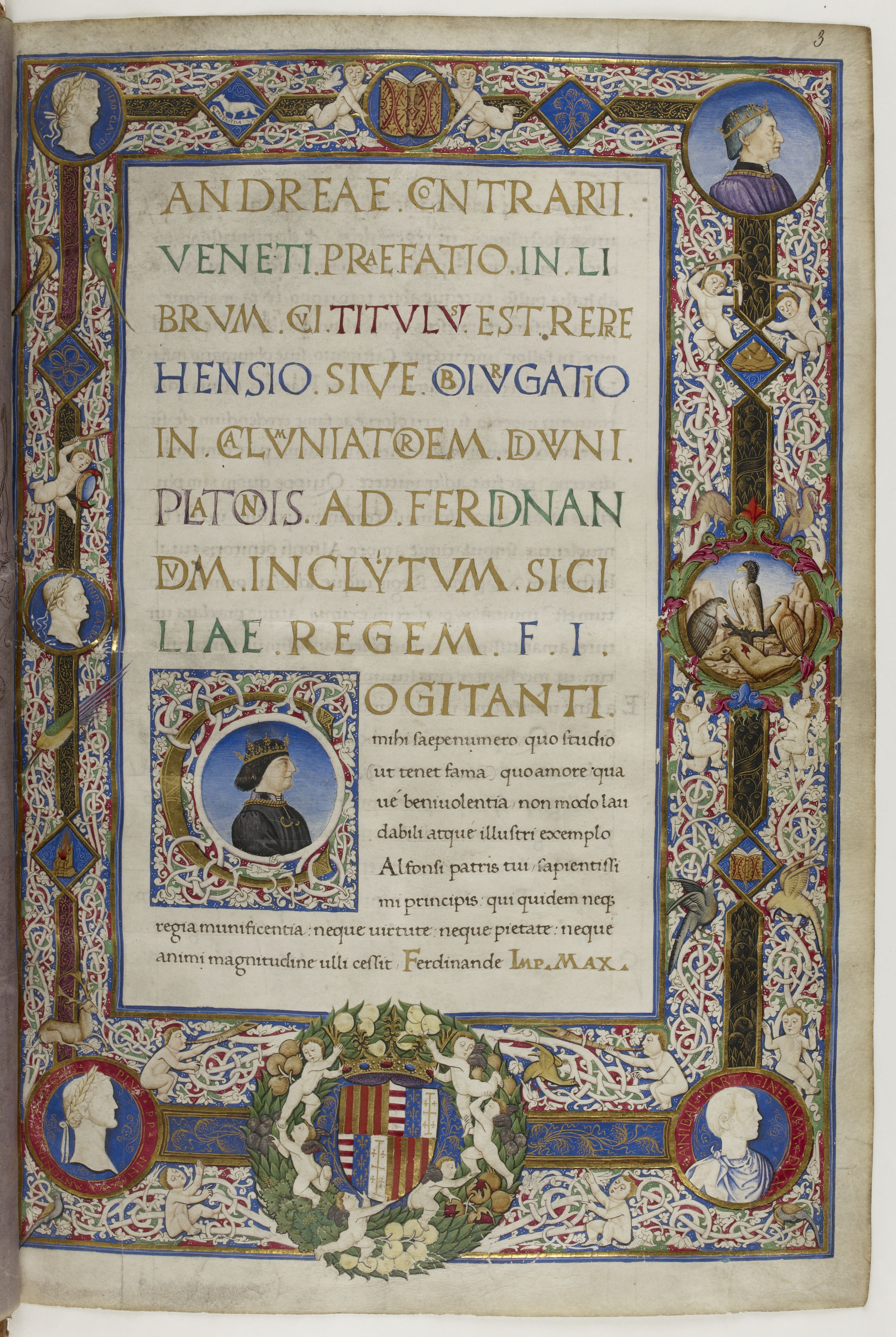
Frontispiece of a copy of Andrea Contrario's book Objurgatio in calumniatorem Divini Platonis, painted by Cola Rapicano

Cola Rapicano (fl. 1451–1488) was an Italian illuminator, working in Naples during the second half of the 15th century.

The earliest mention of Cola Rapicano stems from 1451, and in a document from 1456 he is described as an illuminator. Very little is known about his life. As far as is known, he only worked in Naples, where he was tied to the court of Alfonso V of Aragon and his son Ferdinand I of Naples. He was the head of a workshop producing manuscripts for the rulers; most of the surviving works in his style originate from the former royal library of Naples. Stylistically, he displayed a "strong antiquarian flair" and is recognisable through the use of white vine-stems, putti, and classical elements in the style of Pisanello.

== Gallery ==
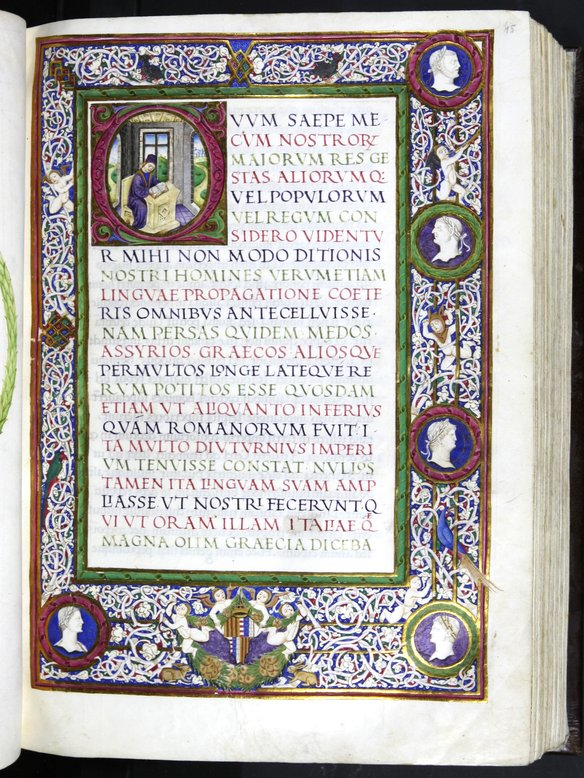
Lorenzo Valla (copied by Pietro Ippolito da Luni)

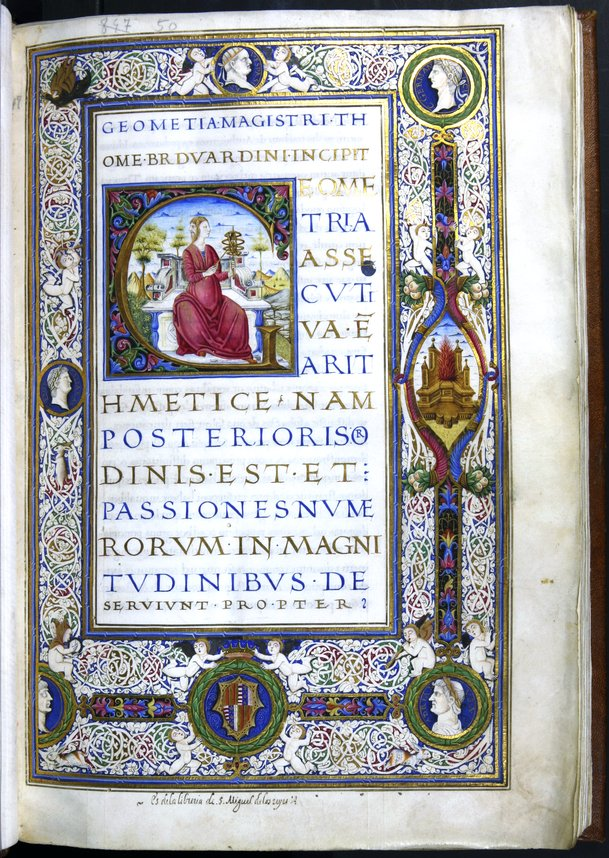
Thomas Bradwardine

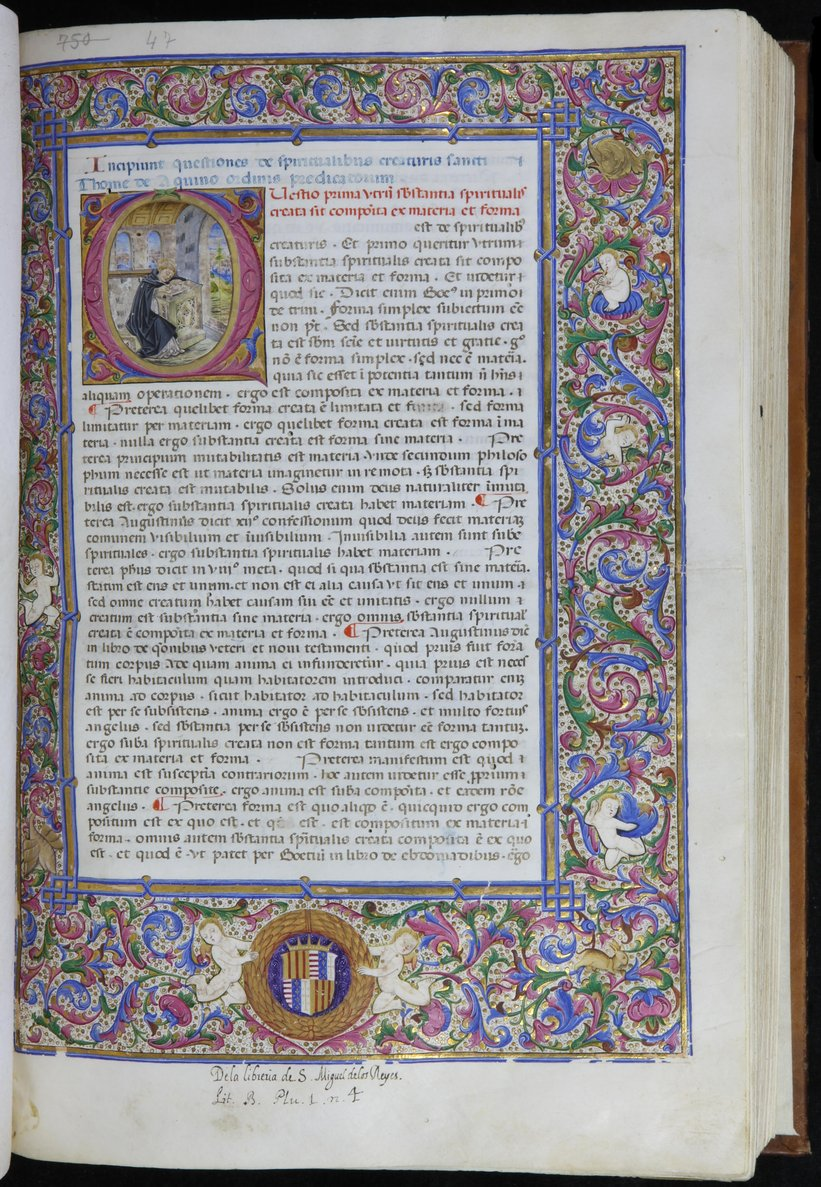
Thomas Aquinas' Quaestiones disputatae
