= Oliviero Carafa =

Italian cardinal and diplomat (1430–1511)

His Eminence Oliviero Carafa
- Cardinal-Bishop of Ostia
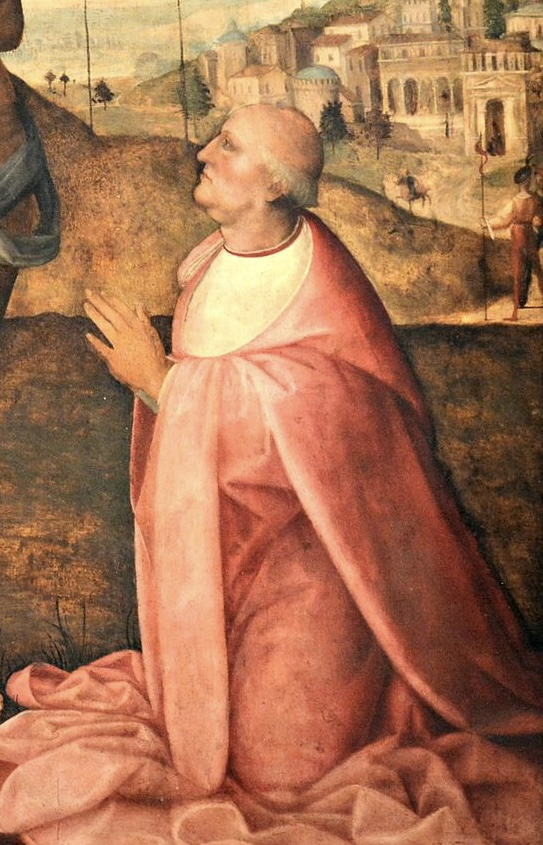
- Detail from a portrait by Cesare da Sesto, early 16th century
- Church: Roman Catholic Church
- Diocese: Diocese of Ostia
- See: Ostia
- Appointed: November 1503
- Term ended: 20 January 1511
- Predecessor: Giuliano della Rovere
- Successor: Raffaele Riario
- Other post: Dean of the College of Cardinals (1492–1511)
- Previous posts: Archbishop of Naples (1458-1484, 1503-1505); Cardinal-Bishop of Albano (1476-1483); Camerlengo of the College of Cardinals (1477); Cardinal-Bishop of Sabina (1483-1503); Bishop of Salamanca (1491-1494); Bishop of Rimini (1495-1497); Bishop of Chieti (1500-1501); Bishop of Caiazzo (1506-1507); Bishop of Terracina, Priverno e Sezze (1507-1510)

Orders
- Ordination: 1476
- Consecration: 1458
- Created cardinal: 18 September 1467 by Pope Paul II
- Rank: Cardinal-Bishop

Personal details
- Born: Oliviero Carafa; 10 March 1430 Naples, Kingdom of Naples
- Died: 20 January 1511 (aged 80) Rome, Papal States
- Buried: Carafa Chapel (1511-1793); Naples Cathedral (1793-present)
- Coat of arms

Oliviero Carafa (10 March 1430 – 20 January 1511), in Latin Oliverius Carafa, was an Italian cardinal and diplomat of the Renaissance. Like the majority of his era's prelates, he displayed the lavish and conspicuous standard of living that was expected of a prince of the Church. In his career, he set an example of conscientiousness for his contemporaries and mentored his relative, Giovanni Pietro Carafa, who became Pope Paul IV.

He was ordained by Bonifacio Colonna in 1476.

== Early ecclesiastic career ==
He was born in Naples to an illustrious house, prominent in the military and administrative service of the House of Aragon. His father Francesco, son of Antonio Carafa, was lord of Torre del Greco, Portici and Resina. His mother Maria Origlia, as contemporaries often pointed out, was distantly related to Thomas Aquinas by way of her mother Anna Sanseverino. His uncle Diomede, in turn, was count of Maddaloni and a close ally to both Alfonso I and Ferrante I. Though he was elevated to the Archbishopric of Naples (18 November 1458) at a young age, his career was mainly that of a statesman rather than an ecclesiastic. He retained the powerful and lucrative position until 20 September 1484, but kept control of the see at the heart of the Regno by ceding the position to his brother Alessandro, retaining his right to resume it should his brother die, by a papal brief. When that eventuality happened (July 1503), he was archbishop once more, ceding the title to his nephew Bernardino, who died within months, and then to Vincenzo. "What emerges clearly from this complicated pattern of exchanged titles is that Carafa was determined to retain the prestigious and wealthy title of Naples within his family's control."

Pope Paul II made him a cardinal of Santi Marcellino e Pietro on 18 September 1467, and Pope Sixtus IV appointed him legate to King Ferdinand of Naples in 1471. Carafa was also named by Sixtus IV admiral of the papal fleet, which captured Smyrna from the Ottoman Turks under his command. Carafa thus gained the reputation of an able military leader and the respect of Sixtus IV, who maintained him in his court despite his feud with the Naples. In 1473, he was appointed protector of the teaching order of the Dominicans. In 1476, he succeeded Cardinal Rodrigo Borgia as bishop of Albano, which much upgraded his standing in the Roman Curia. In the conclave of 1484, Oliviero's name was discussed as a possible successor of Sixtus IV, but his firm adhesion to Ferdinand's interests prevented his candidature. After Innocent VIII's election, Oliviero resigned the see of Naples in favour of his brother, Alessandro Carafa, and was raised to the bishopric of Salamanca, in Spain, which he retained till 1494. During the turbulent reign of Innocent VIII (1484–1492), Carafa acted as an ambassador of Naples to the Holy See, succeeded well in conciliating his King with the Church and received the gratitude of the Roman clergy.

== Borgia rule ==
After Innocent's death (July 1492), Carafa endeavoured again to be made pope but was excluded from the first ballots of the 1492 Conclave (August). Despite his quarrel with his master, he acted in favour of Naples, supporting Cardinal Giuliano della Rovere against Cardinal Rodrigo Borgia (whose Spanish descent seemed a threat to the Aragonese dynasty of Naples). After Borgia's election as Alexander VI, Oliviero's influence was not restrained (he replaced Borgia as dean of the Sacred College of Cardinals).

Pope Alexander VI highly favoured his judgment, as evidenced by one particular occasion:

"After a Consistory on 22nd May, 1493, Alexander brought the session to an end, saying that he would sign no more Briefs that day. But [Carafa] was bold enough to go up to the Pope with the all-important Brief. Before Alexander could dismiss him, [Carafa], doubtless with the smile of one who knows his man and his good personal relations with him ([Carafa] was one of the best of the cardinals), slipped the Pope's ring from off his finger and then and there sealed the document. When the opposition deputation came to protest, Alexander said he had no intention of undoing what had been done. The scene suggests that Alexander was very willing to be led in such matters by a worthy and holy cardinal."

In 1494, Oliviero resigned the see of Chieti in favour of his teenage nephew Giovanni Pietro Carafa, later Pope Paul IV. During Alexander VI's reign, Oliviero gradually gave up his intervention in the Neapolitan affairs and was not engaged in the bull with which the Pope deposed the Aragonese dynasty of Naples in 1501.

== Patron of arts ==
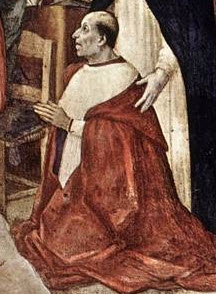
Cardinal Oliviero Carafa. Detail of Filippino Lippi's Annunciation in the Carafa Chapel of Santa Maria sopra Minerva (1489).

Carafa's income was estimated at 12,000 ducats a year. In Naples he brought the High Renaissance to the city in the richly decorated Succorpo in the crypt of the cathedral, designed to contain the relics of Saint Januarius in a sufficiently magnificent manner that it could serve also as his own mortuary chapel; it was commenced in 1497 and completed in 1508. In Rome he established himself in a palazzo of the Orsini in the Parione, where he may have employed Donato Bramante to remodel the structure, which was replaced in the late eighteenth century by Palazzo Braschi. Carafa was an intellectual patron of Renaissance humanists and assembled a great library that was resorted to by scholars. He carried on Torquemada's patronage of printing, at the first printing press in Italy, established by Torquemada at Subiaco. In his household, his nephew Giampietro Carafa, later Pope Paul IV, received a thorough training in Latin, Greek and Hebrew. There in 1501 the battered Roman marble dubbed "Pasquino" by the Romans was unearthed, and set upon a pedestal at the corner of Piazza di Pasquino and Palazzo Braschi, on the west side of Piazza Navona.

He devoted himself to the patronage of art and, as Cardinal Protector of the Dominican order from 1478, generously benefited the Dominican church of Santa Maria sopra Minerva. Dedicated to the Virgin Annuciate and his patron Saint Thomas Aquinas, the chapel was accordingly organized about the theme of the Annunciation. To decorate the chapel, he hired Filippino Lippi in 1488; for the painter, who had made his reputation in Florence, it was his first large-scale fresco. In the altarpiece, Lippi depicted his patron, kneeling, his lean, bony face, long sharp nose and narrow lips in profile, as Saint Thomas Aquinas presents Carafa to the Virgin Mary.

When Bramante arrived in Rome, his first architectural commission came from Carafa, the cloister at Santa Maria della Pace.

During the last years of his life, which fell during the pontificate of Pope Julius II, Carafa was regarded as a wise counsellor of the Church. He died on 20 January 1511. His tomb is in the Carafa Chapel of Santa Maria sopra Minerva, though his remains were later transported to Naples, where he is buried in the cathedral.

== Sources ==
- Frescoes by Filippino Lippi in the Carafa Chapel, Santa Maria sopra Minerva
- Miranda, Salvador. "CARAFA, Oliviero (1430-1511)". The Cardinals of the Holy Roman Church. Florida International University. OCLC 53276621.

Catholic Church titles
Preceded by Giacomo Tebaldi	Archbishop of Naples; 1458–1484	Succeeded by Alessandro Carafa
Preceded by Pedro de Toledo	Bishop of Salamanca; 1491–1494	Succeeded by Diego de Deza
Preceded by Giacomo Passarelli	Bishop of Rimini; 1495–1497	Succeeded by Vincenzo Carafa
Preceded by Giacomo Bacio Terracina	Bishop of Chieti; 1500–1501	Succeeded by Gian Pietro Carafa
Preceded by Alessandro Carafa	Archbishop of Naples (2nd time); 1503–1505	Succeeded by Gianvincenzo Carafa
Preceded by Rodrigo Lanzol-Borja y Borja	Cardinal-bishop of Albano; 1476–1483	Succeeded by Jean Balue
Preceded by Jacopo Piccolomini-Ammannati	Camerlengo of the Sacred College of Cardinals; 1477	Succeeded by Marco Barbo
Preceded by Giuliano della Rovere	Cardinal-bishop of Sabina; 1483–1503	Succeeded by Girolamo Basso della Rovere
Preceded by Rodrigo Lanzol-Borja y Borja	Dean of the College of Cardinals; 1492–1511	Succeeded by Raffaele Riario
Preceded by Giuliano della Rovere	Cardinal-bishop of Ostia; 1503–1511	Succeeded by Raffaele Riario
Preceded by ?	Bishop of Caiazzo; 1506–1507	Succeeded by ?
Preceded by Juan Gálvez (bishop)	Bishop of Terracina, Priverno e Sezze; 1507–1510	Succeeded by Zaccaria de Moris
