= Women in Church history =

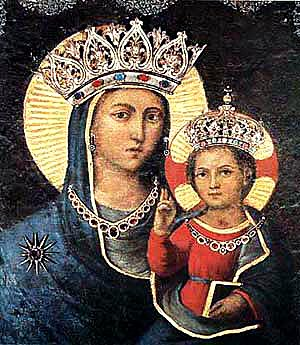
Crowned Madonna Della Strada in the Church of the Gesu in Rome

Women play a variety of roles in Christianity—notably as contemplatives, healthcare providers, educationalists, and missionaries. Until recent times, women have been generally excluded from episcopal and clerical positions within certain Christian churches; however, great numbers of women were influential in the life of the church, from contemporaries of Jesus to subsequent saints, theologians, doctors of the church, missionaries, abbesses, nuns, mystics, founders of religious institutes, military leaders, monarchs, and martyrs.

Christianity emerged from surrounding patriarchal societies that placed men in positions of authority in marriage, society, and government. While the early religion restricted membership of the priesthood to men, its earliest forms offered women an enhanced social status and quickly found a wide following. Women came to play an important role in Christianity through convents and abbeys, practicing as sisters and nuns. Women have maintained an active role throughout the history of Christianity—particularly in the establishment of schools, hospitals, nursing homes, and monastic settlements. Women constitute the majority of members of the consecrated life within the Catholic Church, the largest of the Christian churches. Except for the Eastern Christian churches, in most denominations, women have been the majority of church attendees since early in the Christian era and into the present. In recent decades, ordination of women has become increasingly common in some Protestant churches. Laywomen have also been highly active in the wider life of churches, supporting the community work of parishes.

In Roman Catholicism and Eastern Orthodoxy, particular veneration has been given to Mary, the Mother of Jesus, which made the model of maternal virtue central to their vision of Christianity. However, Marian devotion is generally not a feature of Reformed Christianity.

== Apostolic age ==
=== New Testament ===
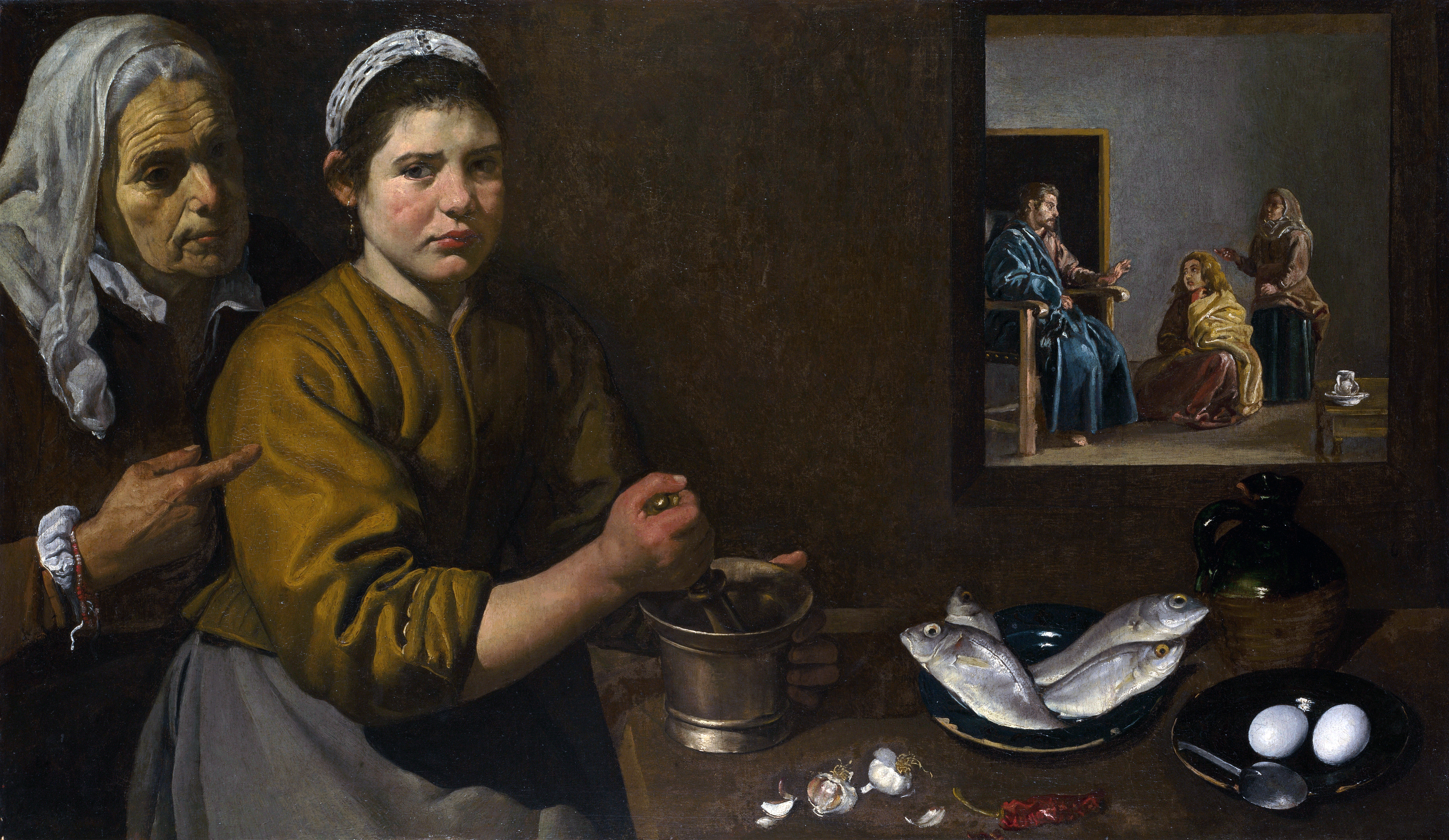
Christ in the House of Martha and Mary, Diego Velázquez, 1618. This Gospel episode suggests that Jesus broke with the conventions of his age and provided religious instruction to women.

The New Testament of the Bible refers to a number of women in Jesus' inner circle (notably his mother Mary, for whom the Catholic Church and Eastern Orthodoxy hold a special place of honour, and Mary Magdalene, who discovered the empty tomb of Christ), although the Catholic Church teaches that Christ appointed only male Apostles.

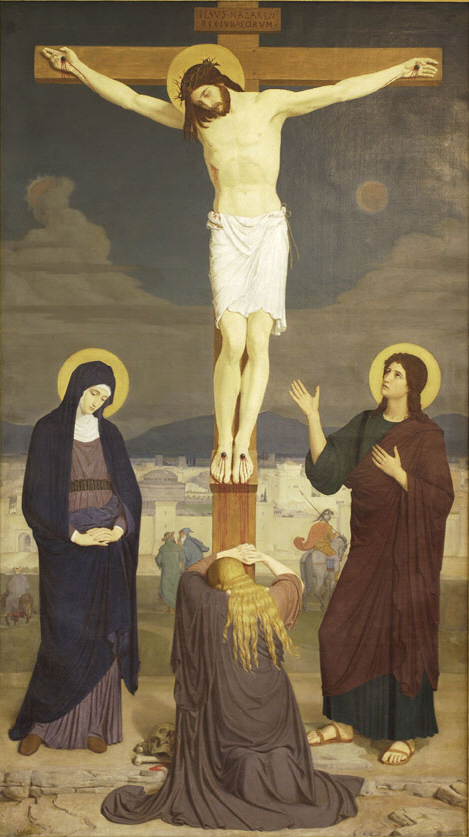
Mary Magdalene kneeling within a Stabat Mater scene by Gabriel Wuger, 1868

Among the most famous accounts of Jesus directly dealing with an issue of morality and women is provided by the story of Jesus and the woman taken in adultery, from verses 7:53–8:11 in the Gospel of John. The passage describes a confrontation between Jesus and the scribes and Pharisees over whether a woman, caught in an act of adultery, ought to be stoned. Jesus shamed the crowd into dispersing, and averted the execution with the famous words: "He that is without sin among you, let him first cast a stone at her." According to the passage, "they which heard it, being convicted by their own conscience, went out one by one, beginning at the eldest, even unto the last," which left Jesus to turn to the woman and say "go, and sin no more."

Another story contained in the Gospels concerning Jesus' attitude to women is the story of Jesus at the house of Martha and Mary. In this story, Mary sat at Jesus' feet as he preached, while Martha toiled in the kitchen preparing a meal. When Martha complained to Mary that she should instead be helping in the kitchen, Jesus said that, on the contrary, "Mary has chosen what is better" (Luke 10:38–42, New International Version).

From the very beginning of the Christian church, women were important members of the movement, although much of the work women have done has been overlooked. Since sources of information stemming from the New Testament church were written and interpreted by men, many assumed that it had been a "man's church". In the 21st century historians began looking in mosaics, frescoes, and inscriptions of that period for information about women's roles in the early church.

Some historians, such as Geoffrey Blainey, have claimed that women were more influential during the period of Jesus' brief ministry than they were in the next thousand years of Christianity. Blainey points to several Gospel accounts of Jesus imparting important teachings to women: his meeting with the Samaritan woman at the well, his anointing by Mary of Bethany, his public admiration for a poor widow who donated some copper coins to the Temple in Jerusalem, his stepping in to aid the woman accused of adultery, and the presence of Mary Magdalene at his side as he was crucified. Blainey then concludes that "as the standing of women was not high in Palestine, Jesus' kindnesses towards them were not always approved by those who strictly upheld tradition."

There were women disciples present at Jesus' crucifixion (Matthew 27.55). Women were reported to be the first witnesses to the resurrection, chief among them again Mary Magdalene. She was not only "witness," but also called a "messenger" of the risen Christ.

=== Assemblies in the Homes of Believers ===
As time went on, groups of Christians organized within the homes of believers. Those who could offer their home for meetings were considered important within the movement and assumed leadership roles. The New Testament Gospels acknowledge that women were among Jesus' earliest followers. Jewish women disciples, including Mary Magdalene, Saint Joanna, and Susanna, had accompanied Jesus during his ministry and supported him out of their private means. Although the details of these gospel stories may be questioned, in general they reflect the prominent historical roles women played in Jesus' ministry as disciples.

=== Early Spread of Christianity ===
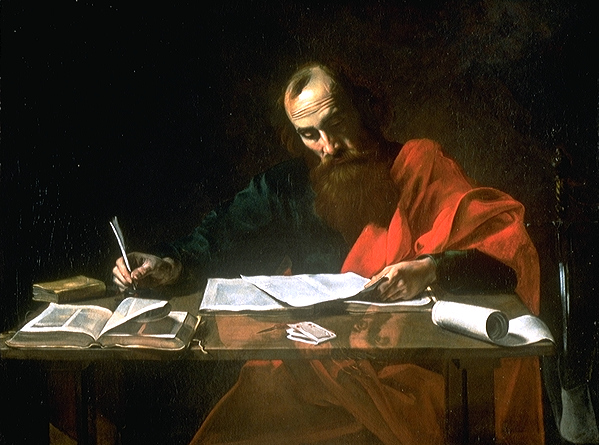
Paul Writing His Epistles, (16th-century depiction). There is much debate about St Paul's attitude to women in the church, however his early letter to the Galatians defied prevailing culture and offered a vision of gender equality: "there is neither male nor female; for you are all one in Jesus Christ".

Historian Geoffrey Blainey has noted that women probably comprised the majority in early Christian congregations. This large female membership likely stemmed in part from the early church's informal and flexible organisation offering significant roles to women. Another factor is that there appeared to be no division between clergy and laity. Leadership was shared among male and female members according to their skills and talents. "But even more important than church organization was the way in which the Gospel tradition and the Gospels themselves, along with the writing of Paul, could be interpreted as moving women beyond silence and subordination." Women may also have been driven from Judaism to Christianity through the taboos and rituals related to the menstrual cycle, and a societal preference for male over female children.

In his Short History of Christianity, Geoffrey Blainey wrote that the early Christians were "sympathetic to women":

Whereas neither the Jewish, nor the Roman family would warm the hearts of a modern feminist, the early Christians were sympathetic to women. Paul himself insisted in his early writings that men and women were equal. His letter to the Galatians was emphatic in defying the prevailing culture, and his words must have been astonishing to women encountering Christian ideas for the first time: 'there is neither male nor female; for you are all one in Jesus Christ'. Women shared equally in what is called the Lord's Supper or Eucharist, a high affirmation of equality.

Blainey went on to note that "the debate about Paul's attitude to women will go on and on", for in later letters ascribed to Paul, it is written "let your women keep silence in the churches", although elsewhere Paul laid down rules for women for prayer and prophesying during religious services.

The early Christian texts refer to various women activists in the early church. One such woman was St. Priscilla, a Jewish missionary from Rome, who may have helped found the Christian community at Corinth. She traveled as a missionary with her husband and St Paul, and tutored the Jewish intellectual Apollos. Others include the four daughters of Philip the Evangelist, from Caesarea, Palestine, who were said to be prophets and to have hosted St Paul in their home. However, some people, including the author of Acts, did not see women as true missionaries or leaders in their own right even though they performed good acts in the community. Widows for example were recognized as a group in society but were not admitted into the clerical rank. While women did have roles in early Christianity, as Christianity became formalized with sacraments and hierarchization or church office, women's earlier public roles were restricted and regulated. Modern scholarship has further examined these developments, including the work of Karen Jo Torjesen, who has analyzed women's leadership in early Christian communities and the institutional processes that led to the restriction of those roles over time.

=== Debatably Equal Partnership Between Men and Women ===
In the Bible, there are many quotes that explore this equality. One authentic Christian tradition is "Wives, submit yourselves to your own husbands, as to the Lord" while "Husbands, love your wives, even as Christ also loved the Church, and gave himself for it". Not only are women supposed to love and put forth effort in a marriage, men are too. This equality gives a supportive base to marriage. Another quote from the Bible is that "we are all one in Jesus Christ". In early Christianity, this was a new concept that was practiced and preached. The oneness of humankind between male and female was a defining feature of this new religion. As stated before, women were given equality by adding the title of deacon (deaconess). This tradition continued until the 15th century, and still persists in some women's monasteries among the eastern churches and in Protestant churches. In Christian Orthodoxy, the function of the two sexes is genuine (have equal roles) and seen as a mutual fellowship. Both men and women are to offer love and sacrifice, according to Jesus Christ. An Orthodox text states that an Orthodox woman should not feel inferior to men simply because she cannot stand in front of the holy altar, for everything in the church is a result of cooperation. Women's roles in the church have changed over time, with different opportunities for particiaption and leadership. While some positions were not allowed for women, they still were able to get involved with the church. The equal partnership between men and women is not only seen in the religious aspect of Christianity but also in the social and home life.

== Patristic age ==
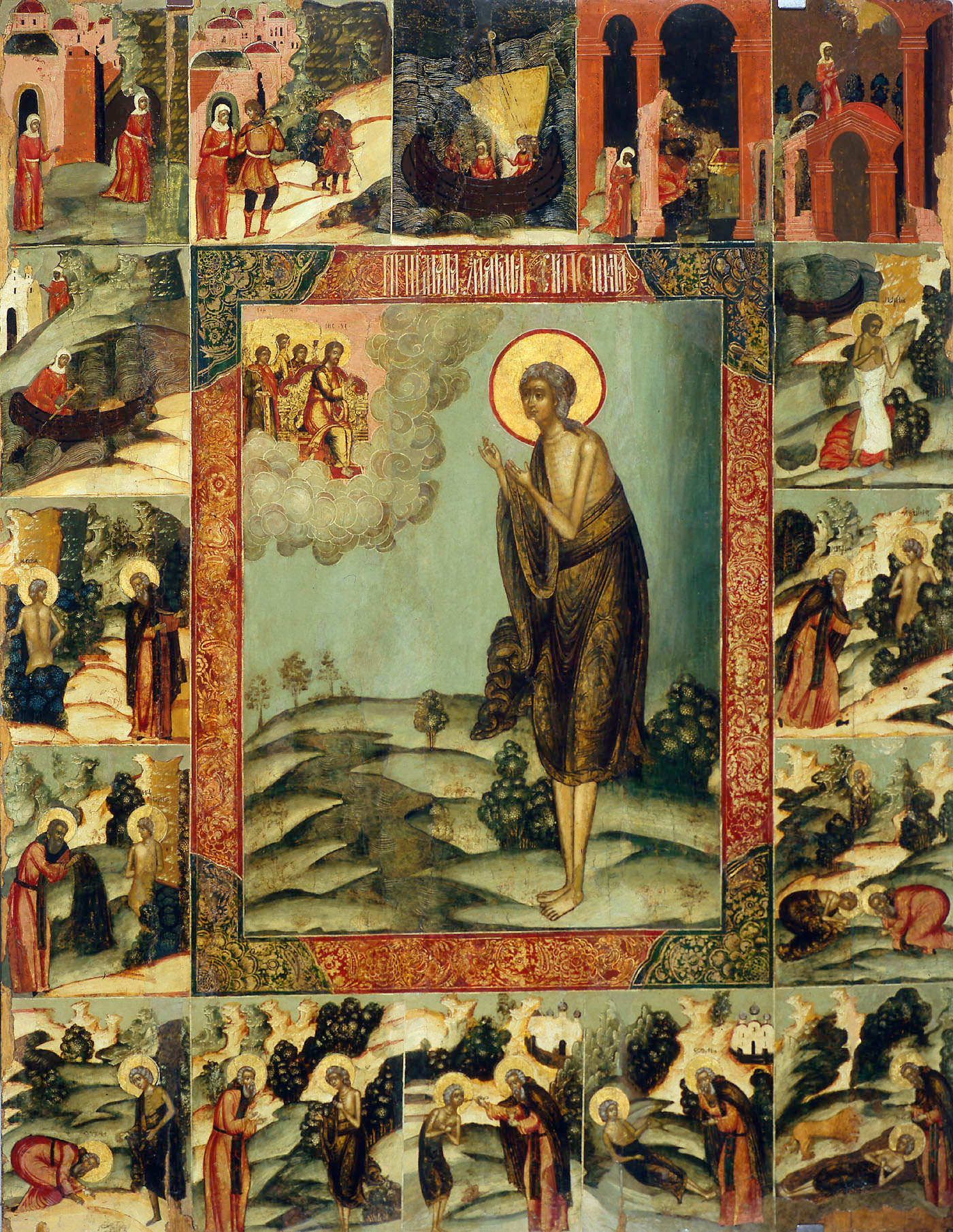
Icon of the 5th-century hermit saint, Mary of Egypt, surrounded by scenes from her life (17th century, Beliy Gorod)

There is compelling evidence of a great deal of activity by women in the life of congregations during the early centuries of Christianity. Women served as deacons and ladies of means like Lydia of Philippi acted as financiers. Women probably constituted the majority of Christians. Blainey notes that by around AD 300, women had become so influential in the affairs of the church that the pagan philosopher Porphyry "complained that Christianity had suffered because of them". Nevertheless, by the close of the Patristic era, a male hierarchy had established itself over church affairs, with priests and bishops running the congregations.

=== Women and Intelligence ===
For lawyer and apologist Minucius Felix, who wrote c. 200 AD, women are born with the same capacity as men, among other things:

Since my brother used such expressions as that he was "vexed" and "indignant" that illiterate, poor, and unskilled people should dispute about heavenly things, let him know that all men are born alike, with a capacity and ability of reasoning and feeling, without bias to age, gender, or dignity...

=== Ministry Restricted to Men ===
From the early patristic age, the offices of teacher and sacramental minister were reserved for men throughout most of the church in the East and West.

=== Women in Literature and Monasticism ===
With the exception of the Acts of Perpetua and Felicita (Acta Perpetuae et Felicitatis_{it}; 2nd century), the attribution of which is partly ascribed to Tertullian, Proba and Egeria were the first rich Christian noblewomen to have left written documents in the 4th century.

This period was characterized by the presence of wealthy, educated noblewomen, who could read and write Latin. Many founded monasteries in their own homes and abroad, evidence of which remains in the letters of some Church Fathers.

Saint Macrina founded a female community in Annesi, preceding the cenobitic monasticism of the brothers Basil and Gregory by several years.

Paula of Rome and her daughter Eustochium joined the intellectual circle of Saint Marcella of Rome on the Aventine and then followed Saint Jerome to Bethlehem, speaking Latin, Greek, and a better Hebrew than her spiritual director.

Marcella of Rome answered questions about scripture from priests after Jerome left Rome and took part in the Origenist controversy .

Melania the Elder founded a double monastery with Rufinus of Aquileia on the Mount of Olives, convinced Evagrius Ponticus to wear the monastic habit, and was the only person with whom Evagrius discussed theology.

Her granddaughter, Melania the Younger, having lost her two sons, convinced her husband to become a monk as well. After freeing their female slaves, she turned their house into a domestic monastery and devoted herself to manual labour, putting slaves and master on an equal footing.

Olympias of Nicomedia founded a female community in Hagia Sophia, attracting several hundred nuns from Roman senatorial families.

In addition to the Desert Fathers, in the 4th century there were also older hermit nuns who were considered holier and more experienced in the path of asceticism by other hermits, around whom communities sprang up. They were called by the Hebrew title of Amma (mother) corresponding to Abba (father, for male Abbotts). Their apothegms were transcribed by male monks. One example was Saint Syncletica of Alexandria.

=== Church Fathers on the Role of Women ===
Origen (AD 185-254) stated that,

Even if it is granted to a woman to show the sign of prophecy, she is nevertheless not permitted to speak in an assembly. When Miriam the prophetess spoke, she was leading a choir of women ... For [as Paul declares] "I do not permit a woman to teach," and even less "to tell a man what to do."

Historian Philip Schaff records early church fathers of the 3rd and 4th centuries as teaching, regarding 1 Cor. 14: 34,35,

Tertullian, the second-century Latin father, wrote that "It is not permitted to a woman to speak in church. Neither may she teach, baptize, offer, nor claim for herself any function proper to a man, least of all the sacerdotal office." ("On the Veiling of Virgins").

=== Female Saints ===
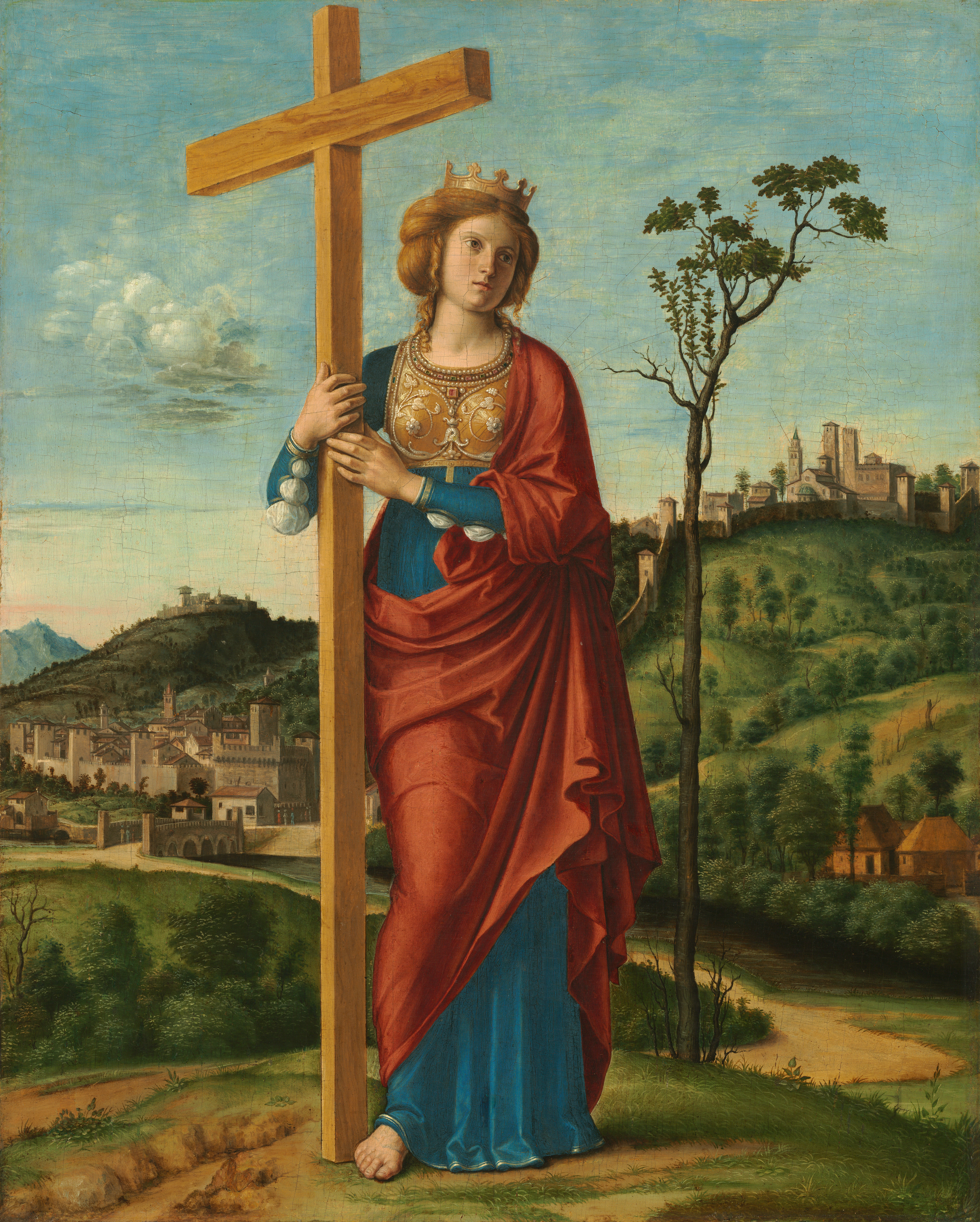
St. Helena, mother of Emperor Constantine

Women commemorated as saints from these early centuries include several martyrs who suffered under the Persecution of Christians in the Roman Empire, such as Agnes of Rome, Saint Cecilia, Agatha of Sicily and Blandina. In late Antiquity, Saint Helena was a Christian and consort of Emperor Constantius, and the mother of Emperor Constantine I. As such her role in history is of great significance as her son Constantine, through the Edict of Milan, made tolerance of diverse religious practices, including Christianity, legal across the Roman Empire, and became a convert himself—ending centuries of mistreatment of Christians. Similarly, Saint Monica was a pious Christian and mother of Saint Augustine of Hippo. She strongly opposed of his involvement with Manichaeism and appears to have had a significant influence on his religious development. Monica also appears in Augustine's early philosophical dialogues, where she is presented as having philosophical ideas of her own. Augustine converted to Christianity in 386 and later became an influential theologian and philosopher in Western Christianity.

Other women contributed to the development of early Christian monasticism, seeking redemption in the wilderness, as with the hermit Saint Mary of Egypt (c.AD 344–421) who is venerated in Western, Eastern, Oriental and African Christianity, for entering a life of penitence and prayer in the deserts beyond the Jordan River, after arriving from Egypt as a prostitute.

== Middle Ages ==
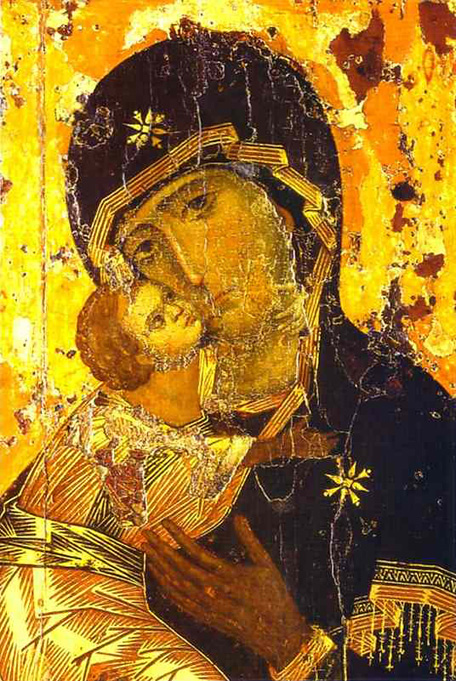
Our Lady of Vladimir, one of the holiest medieval representations of the Theotokos

As Western Europe transitioned from the Classical to Medieval Age, the male hierarchy with the Pope as its summit became a central player in European politics, however many women leaders also emerged at various levels within the Church. In the East, a similar male hierarchy prevailed around the Patriarch at Constantinople. However, women rose to play an active role in religion after the Fall of Rome: mysticism flourished and monastic convents and communities of women became powerful institutions within Europe. Marian devotion blossomed, setting a model of maternal virtue at the heart of Western civilization.

In the West, the Roman Catholic Church was the major unifying cultural influence in Europe during the Middle Ages with its selection from Latin learning, preservation of the art of writing, and a centralized administration through its network of bishops. In the East, that role fell to the Orthodox Church and Byzantine Empire (the churches split in 1054). In the Roman Catholic and Eastern Orthodox Church, the priesthood and the ministries dependent upon it such as Bishop, Patriarch and Pope, were restricted to men. The first Council of Orange (441) forbade the ordination of women to the diaconate.

With the establishment of Christian monasticism, other influential roles became available to women. From the 5th century onward, Christian convents provided an alternative for some women to the path of marriage and child-rearing and allowed them to acquire literacy and learning, and play a more active religious role. While non-aristocratic women were in many respects excluded from political and mercantile life in the Middle Ages, leading churchwomen were an exception. Medieval abbesses and female superiors of monastic houses were powerful figures whose influence could rival that of male bishops and abbots: "They treated with kings, bishops, and the greatest lords on terms of perfect equality; ... they were present at all great religious and national solemnities, at the dedication of churches, and even, like the queens, took part in the deliberation of the national assemblies...".

A major spokesman for the Church in the High Middle Ages (11th through 13th centuries) was Thomas Aquinas, one of the 33 Doctors of the Roman Catholic Church and renowned 13th-century theologian.

=== Virgin Mary and Female Saints ===
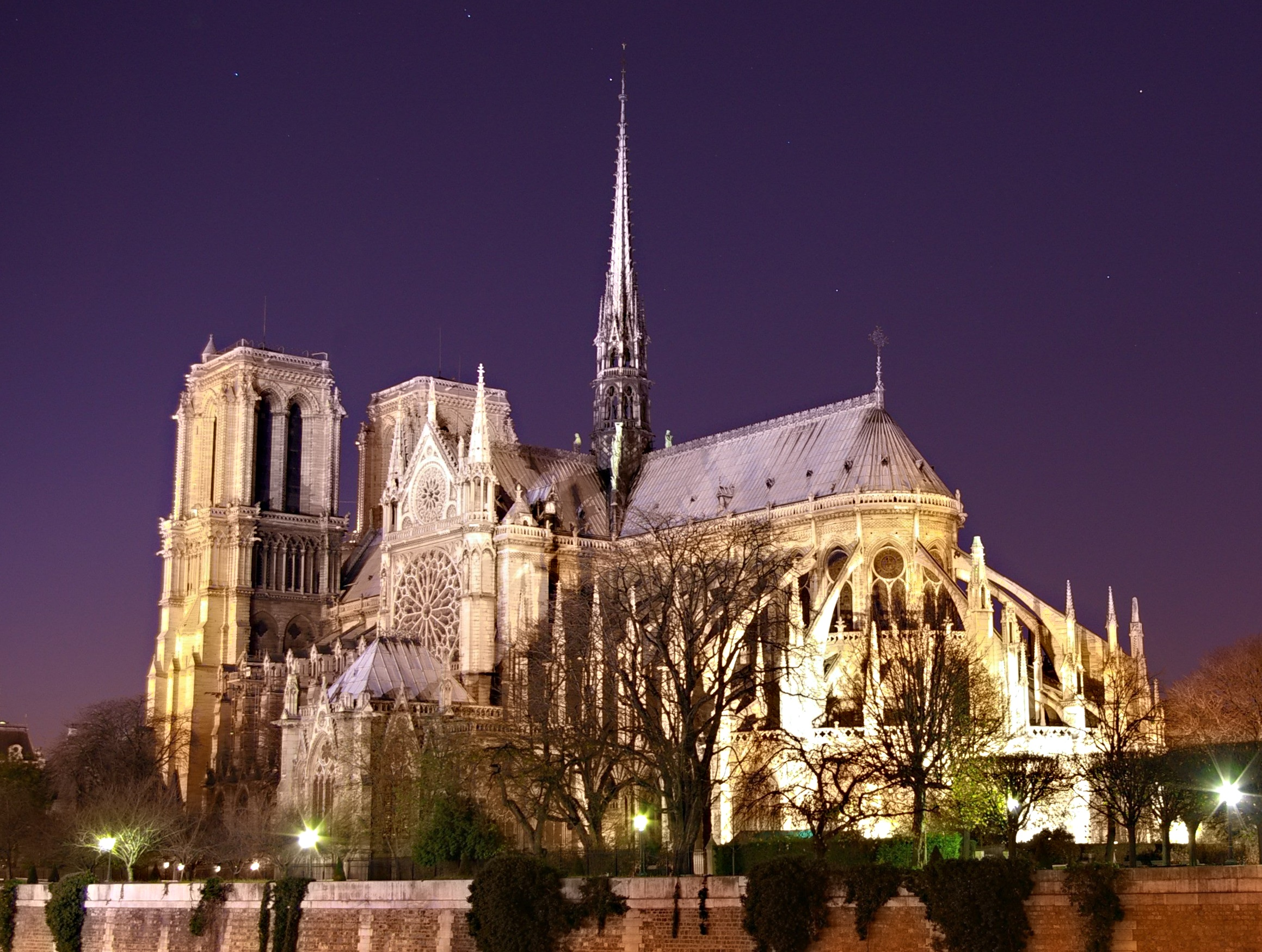
Notre Dame Cathedral, Paris, is one of many important cathedrals named in honour of Mary, the mother of Jesus.

Geoffrey Blainey wrote that women were more prominent in the life of the Church during the Middle Ages than at any previous time in its history, with a number of church reforms initiated by women. Blainey cited the ever growing veneration of the Virgin Mary and Mary Magdalene as evidence of a high standing for female Christians at that time. Irish hagiography records that, as Europe was entering the Medieval Age, the abbess St. Brigit of Kildare was founding monasteries across Ireland. The Celtic Church played an important role in restoring Christianity to Western Europe following the Fall of Rome, due in part to the work of nuns like Brigid.

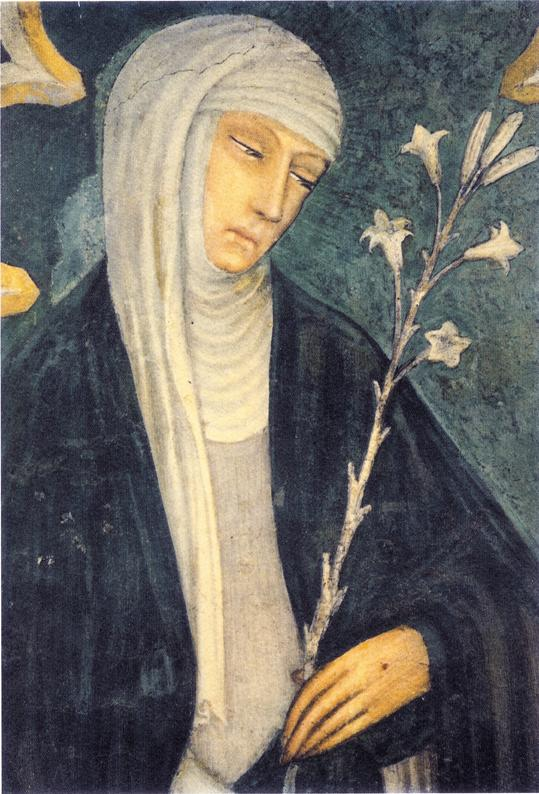
Doctor of the Church St. Catherine of Siena was an influential 14th-century theologian who worked to bring the Avignon Papacy back to Rome.

The Virgin Mary became increasingly important to Christian worship through the Middle Ages. She was conferred such titles as Mother of God and Queen of Heaven. Mary Magdalene's Feast Day was celebrated in earnest from the 8th century on and composite portraits of her developed from Gospel references to other women Jesus met.

The art historian Kenneth Clarke wrote that, if art is taken as a guide, then only from the 12th century did the cult of the Virgin come to appeal to the popular imagination in the West. The great Cathedrals of France were dedicated to her: Notre Dame de Paris, Amiens, Laon, Rouen and Rheims. Chartres Cathedral in particular honoured Mary with the elaborate splendour of its architecture. St Bernard of Clairvaux preached of her as an ideal of beauty and mediator between humanity and God.

St. Clare of Assisi was one of the first followers of Saint Francis of Assisi. She founded the Order of Poor Ladies, a contemplative monastic religious order for women in the Franciscan tradition, and wrote their Rule of Life—the first monastic rule known to have been written by a woman. Following her death, the order she founded was named in her honor the Order of Saint Clare, commonly referred to today as the Poor Clares.

St. Catherine of Siena (1347–1380) was a Dominican tertiary and mystic of considerable influence who was proclaimed a Doctor of the Church in 1970. Considered by her contemporaries to have high levels of spiritual insight, she worked with the sick and poor, experienced "visions", gathered disciples and participated in the highest levels of public life through letters to the princes of Italy, consultations with papal legates and by acting as a diplomat negotiating between the city states of Italy. She counseled for reform of the clergy and was influential in convincing Pope Gregory XI to leave Avignon and restore the Holy See to Rome.

Monastic orders came to include key Catholic figures such as Doctor of the Church Teresa of Ávila, whose influence on practices such as Christian meditation continues to date.

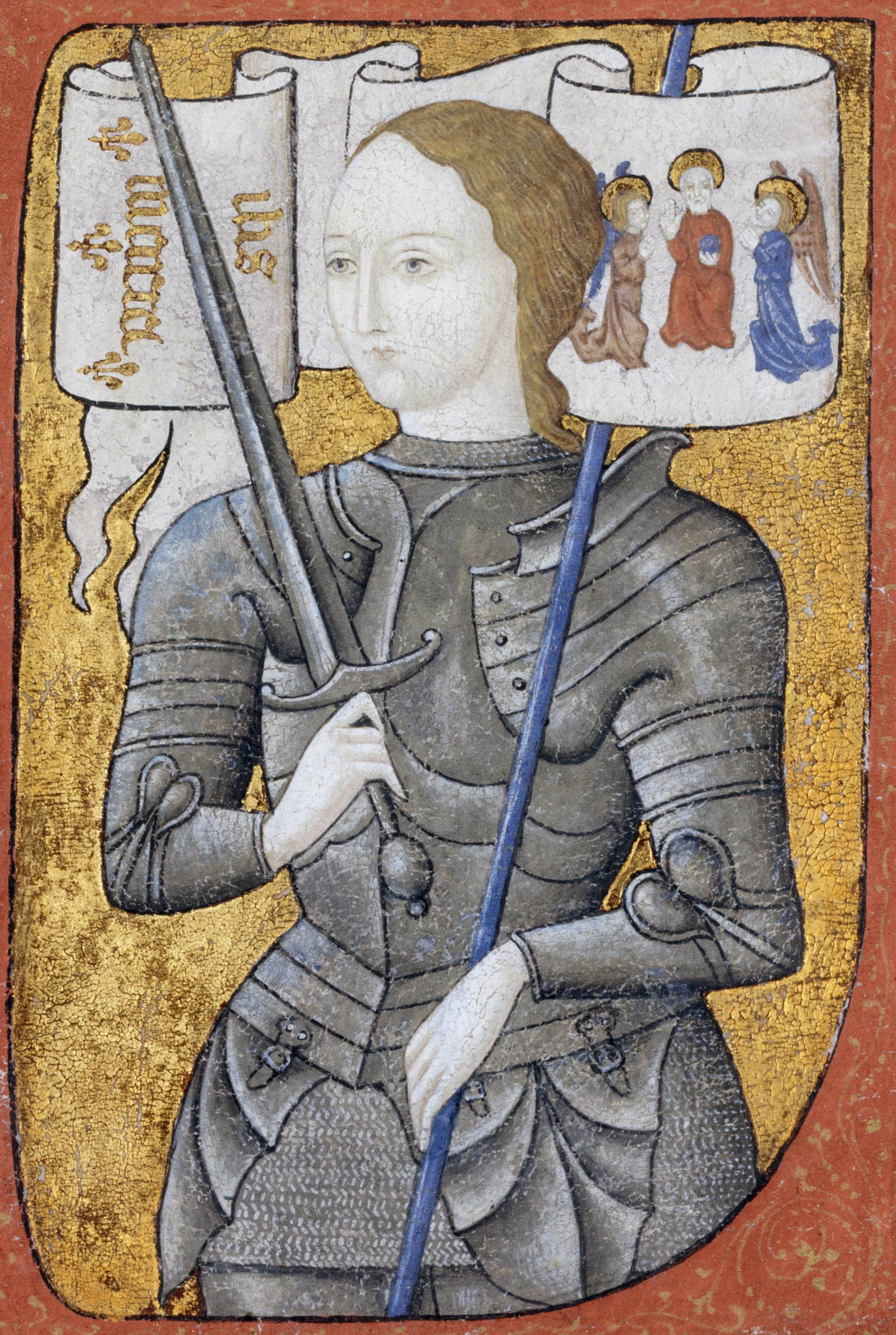
St. Joan of Arc

Arguably the most famous female Catholic Saint of the period is St. Joan of Arc. Considered a national heroine of France, she began life as a pious peasant girl. As with other saints of the period, Joan is said to have experienced supernatural dialogues which gave her spiritual insight and directed her actions—but unlike typical heroines of the period, she donned male attire and, claiming divine guidance, sought out the King Charles VII of France to offer help in a military campaign against the English. Taking up a sword, she achieved military victories before being captured. Her English captors and their Burgundian allies then arranged for her to be tried as a "witch and heretic", after which she was burned at the stake. A papal inquiry later declared the trial illegal. A hero to the French, sympathy grew for Joan even in England and in 1909 she was canonised a saint.

== Monarchs from the Middle Ages to Post-Reformation ==
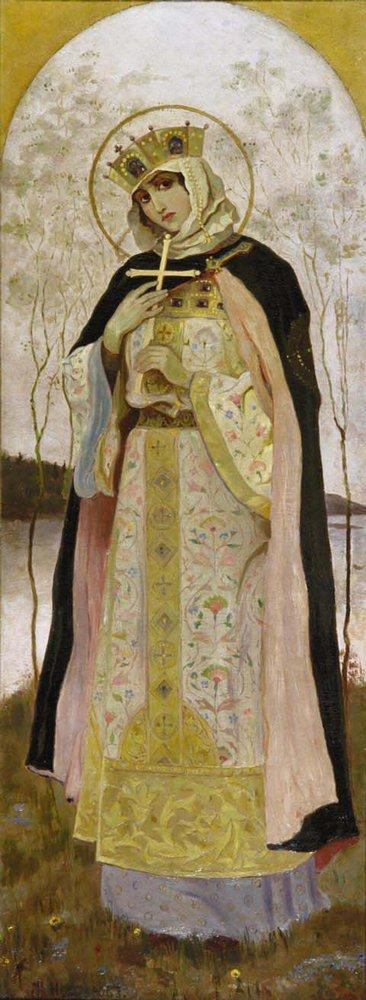
St Olga of Kiev

A network of European monarchies established power throughout Western Europe through the Medieval period. Men were generally given precedence to reign as monarch, however aristocratic women could achieve influence. A number of such women were singled out as model Christians by Pope John Paul II in his Mulieris Dignitatem letter on the dignity and vocation of women: Olga of Kiev, Matilda of Tuscany, Hedwig of Silesia, Jadwiga of Poland and Elizabeth of Hungary.

The first Russian ruler to convert to Christianity was Olga of Kiev around 950AD. She was an important figure in the spread of Christianity to Russia and commemorated by both the Catholic and Orthodox churches. Italian noblewoman Matilda of Tuscany (1046–1115) is remembered for her military accomplishments and for being the principal Italian supporter of Pope Gregory VII during the Investiture Controversy. Saint Hedwig of Silesia (1174–1243) supported the poor and the church in Eastern Europe and Jadwiga of Poland reigned as monarch of Poland and, within the Catholic Church, is honoured as the patron saint of queens and of a "united Europe". Saint Elisabeth of Hungary (1207–1231) was a symbol of Christian charity who used her wealth to establish hospitals and care for the poor.

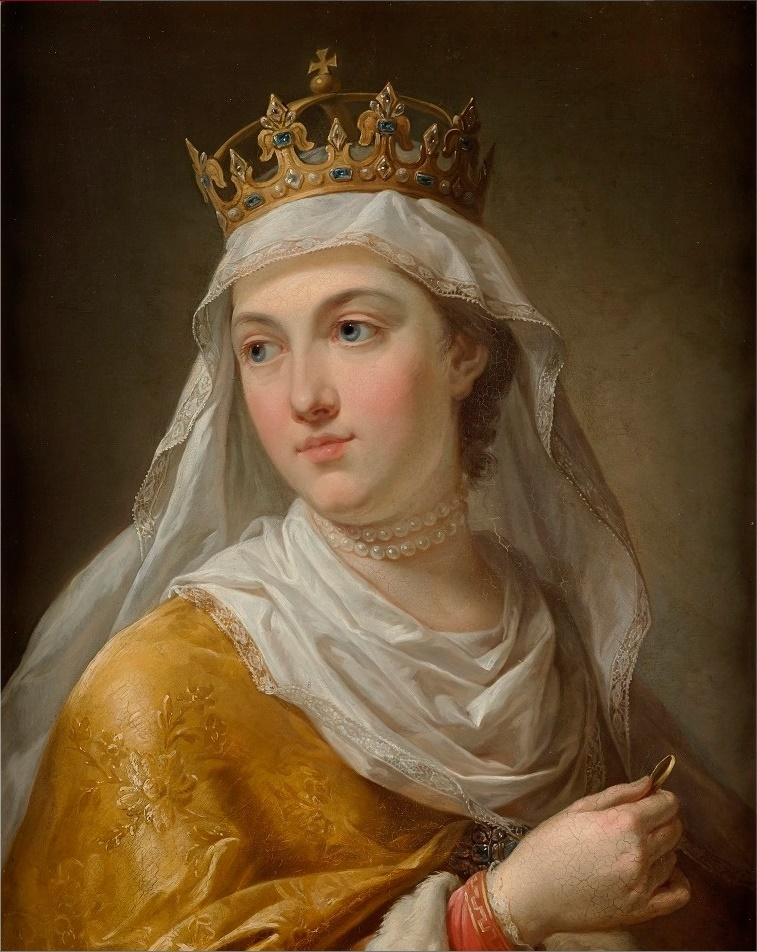
Saint Jadwiga of Poland is the patron saint of queens n the Catholic Church.

As sponsor of Christopher Columbus' 1492 mission to cross the Atlantic, the Spanish Queen Isabella I of Castille (known as Isabella the Catholic), was an important figure in the growth of Catholicism as a global religion. Her marriage to Ferdinand II of Aragon had ensured the unity of the Spanish Kingdom and the royal couple held equal authority. The Catholic Monarchs then conquered the last Moorish bastion in Spain at Granada in January 1492 and seven months later, Columbus sailed for the Americas. The Catholic encyclopedia credits Isabella as an extremely able ruler and one who "fostered learning not only in the universities and among the nobles, but also among women". Of Isabella and Ferdinand, it says: "The good government of the Catholic sovereigns brought the prosperity of Spain to its apogee, and inaugurated that country's Golden Age".

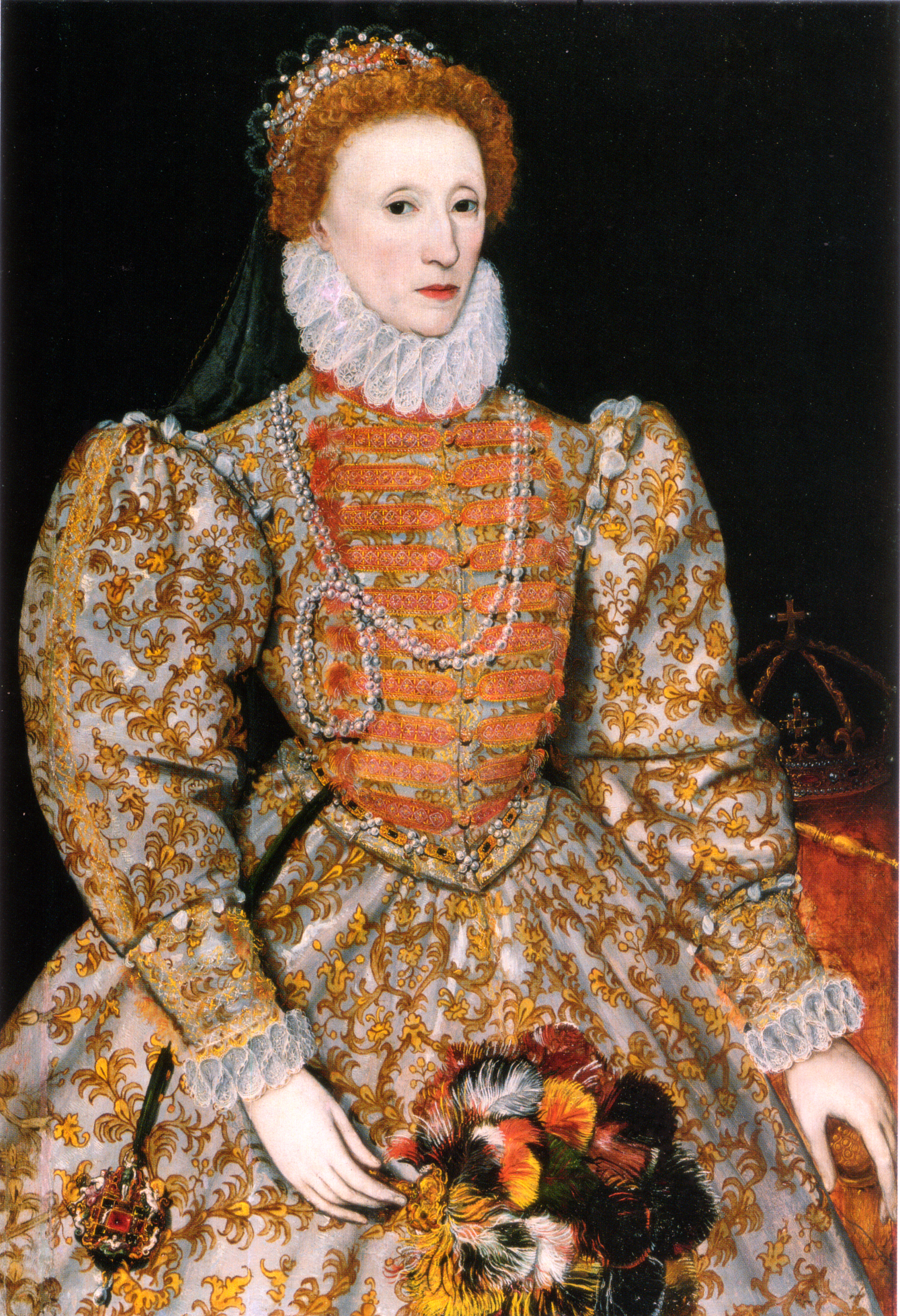
Queen Elizabeth I

The Reformation swept through Europe during the 16th Century. The excommunication of Protestants by leaders of the Roman Catholic Church ended centuries of unity among Western Christendom. The refusal of Pope Clement VI to grant an annulment in the marriage of King Henry VIII to Catherine of Aragon saw Henry establish himself as supreme governor of the church in England. Mary I of England, was his eldest daughter. She succeeded the throne and executed her Protestant half-sister Lady Jane Grey who has been called the Nine Day Queen. Mary was the daughter of Catherine of Aragon, and thus remained loyal to Rome and sought to restore the Roman Church in England. Her re-establishment of Roman Catholicism was reversed after her death in 1558 by her successor and younger half-sister, Elizabeth I. Rivalry emerged between Elizabeth and the Catholic Mary Queen of Scots, finally settled with the execution of Mary in 1587. The religion of an heir or monarch's spouse complicated intermarriage between royal houses through coming centuries.

Consorts of the Holy Roman Emperors were given the title of Holy Roman Empress. The throne was reserved for males, though women such as Theophanu and Maria Theresa of Austria controlled the power and served as de facto Empresses regnant. The powerful Maria Theresa acquired her right to the throne of the Habsburg monarchy by means of the Pragmatic Sanction of 1713, allowing for female succession—but she had to fight the War of the Austrian Succession to secure her right to reign. Following victories, her husband, Francis Stephen, was chosen as Holy Roman Emperor in 1745, confirming Maria Theresa's status as a European leader. A liberal-minded autocrat, she was a patron of sciences and education and sought to alleviate the suffering of the serfs. On religion she pursued a policy of cujus regio, ejus religio, keeping Catholic observance at court and frowning on Judaism and Protestantism—but the ascent of her son as co-regnant Emperor saw restrictions placed on the power of the Church in the Empire. She reigned for 40 years, and had 16 children including Marie-Antoinette, the ill-fated Queen of France.

== Reformation and Baroque period ==
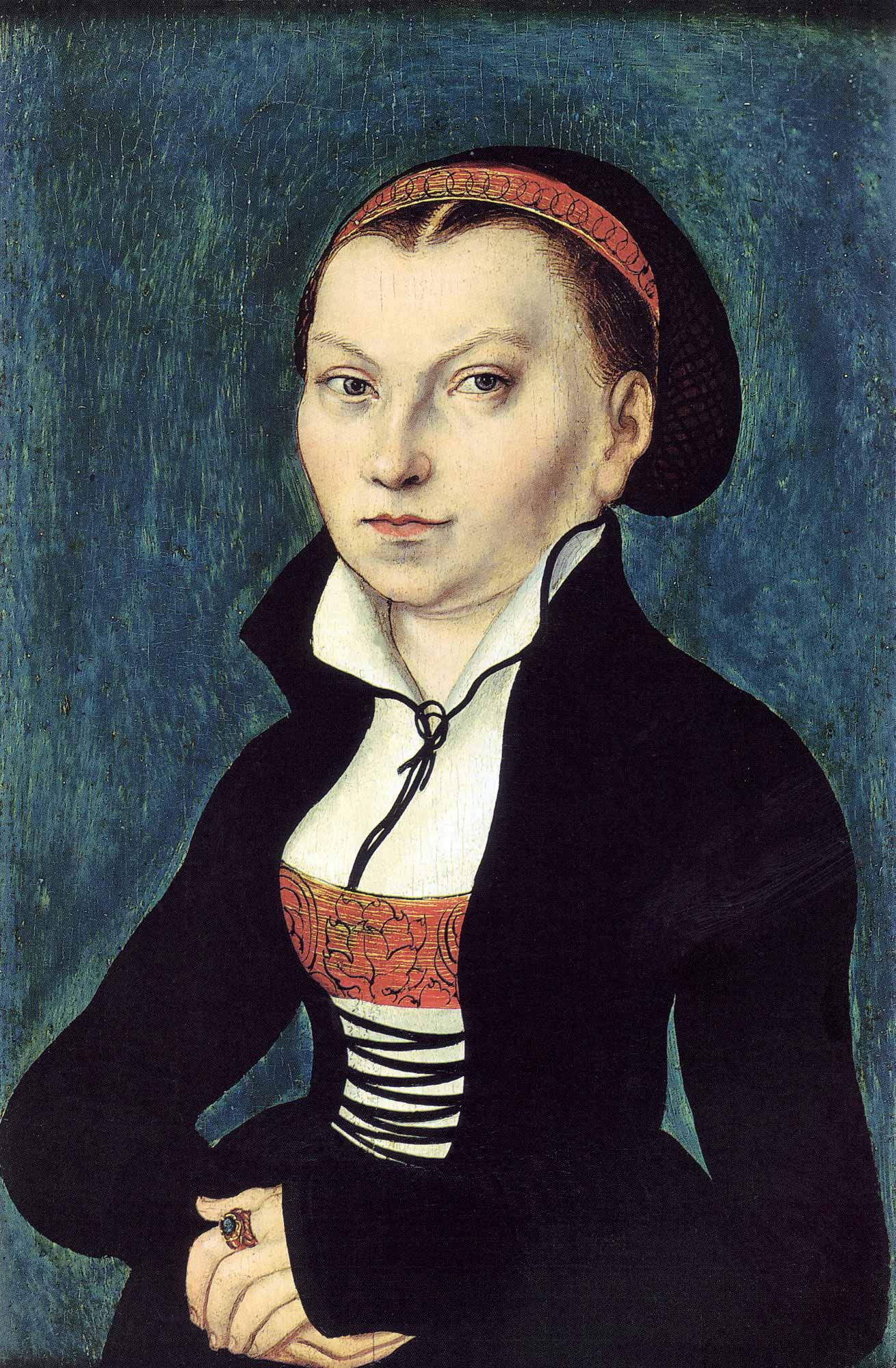
Katherine von Bora

The Protestant Reformation closed convents in Reformed areas, which effectively closed off the option of a full-time religious role for Protestant women, as well as one which had provided some women a life in academic study.

However, some convents (such as Ebstorf Abbey near the town of Uelzen and Bursfelde Abbey in Bursfelde) adopted the Lutheran faith. Many of these convents in eastern Europe were closed by communist authorities after the Second World War. They are sometimes called damenstift. One notable damenstift member was Catharina von Schlegel (1697–1777) who wrote the hymn that was translated into English as Be still, my soul, the Lord is on thy side. Besides the Lüne abbeys, three exclusively female Lutheran orders for women open today are the Communität Casteller Ring, the Daughters of Mary, and the Evangelical Sisterhood of Mary. Although Communität Christusbruderschaft Selbitz is mixed, it is almost entirely female. However, other convents voluntarily folded during the Reformation. For example, following Catherine of Mecklenburg's choice to defy her Catholic husband and smuggle Lutheran books to Ursula of Munsterberg and other nuns, Ursula (in 1528) published 69 articles justifying their reasons to leave their convent. Martin Luther himself taught that "the wife should stay at home and look after the affairs of the household as one who has been deprived of the ability of administering those affairs that are outside and concern the state…." Among the many nuns who chose the domestic life over the monastic life was the wife of Martin Luther, Katherine von Bora. John Calvin agreed that "the woman's place is in the home."

The majority of Protestant churches upheld the traditional position, and restricted ruling and preaching roles within the Church to men until the 20th century, although there were early exceptions among some groups such as the Quakers and within some Pentecostal holiness movements.

In 1569, Lutheran Magdalena Heymair became the first woman ever to have her writings listed on the Index Librorum Prohibitorum. She published a series of pedagogical writings for elementary-age teaching and also wrote poetry. Calvinist Anne Locke was a translator and poet who published the first English sonnet sequence. In 1590, Christine of Hesse published the Lutheran psalm-book Geistliche Psalmen und Lieder.

John Knox (1510–1572) also denied women the right to rule in the civic sphere, as he asserted in his famous First Blast of the Trumpet Against the Monstrous Regiment of Women.

Baptist theologian Dr. John Gill (1690–1771) comments on 1 Corinthians 14:34,35, stating

In Gen_3:16, "thy desire shall be to thy husband, and he shall rule over thee". By this the apostle would signify, that the reason why women are not to speak in the church, or to preach and teach publicly, or be concerned in the ministerial function, is, because this is an act of power, and authority; of rule and government, and so contrary to that subjection which God in his law requires of women unto men. The extraordinary instances of Deborah, Huldah, and Anna, must not be drawn into a rule or example in such cases.

Methodist founder John Wesley (1703–1791) and Methodist theologian Adam Clarke (1762–1832) both upheld male headship, but allowed that spiritual Christian women could publicly speak in church meetings if they "are under an extraordinary impulse of the Spirit" (Wesley), and that such were to obey that influence, and that "the apostle lays down directions in chap. 11 for regulating her personal appearance when thus employed." (Clarke) Puritan theologian Matthew Poole (1624–1679) concurred with Wesley, adding, "But setting aside that extraordinary case of a special afflatus, [strong Divine influence] it was, doubtless, unlawful for a woman to speak in the church."

Matthew Henry (1662–1714) in his commentary, entertained allowing "praying, and uttering hymns inspired" by women, as such "were not teaching".

In A Very Short History of the World, Geoffrey Blainey wrote that, in removing the institution of the convent, the Reformation at first indirectly reduced the power of women, for convents had been places where women could achieve power and influence, as in Zurich where the Benedictine abbesses had helped administer the town. However, the Protestant belief that all people should be able to read the Bible led to an increase in female literacy, wrote Blainey, as a result of the opening of new schools, and the introduction of compulsory education for boys and girls in places like Lutheran Prussia beginning in 1717.

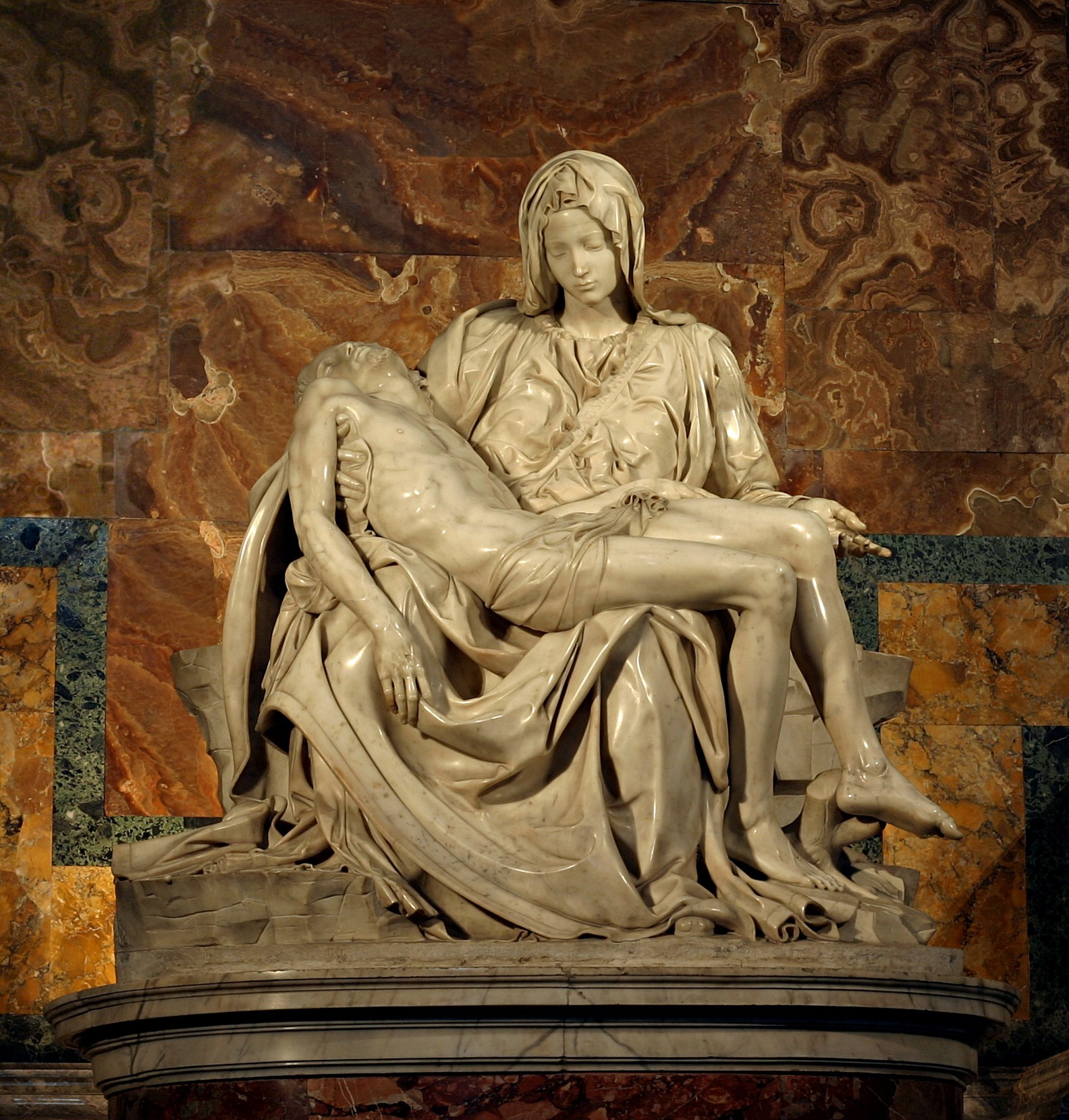
Michelangelo's Pietà

A general tenet of the Protestant reformers was that Marian devotion (the "cult of Mary") and the "cult of saints" should be rejected. Thus, in the communities of Europe and North America that adopted Protestantism, the centuries-old rituals and theology associated with Mary and formal sainthood that had been built up by the Catholic tradition were largely expunged in the aftermath of the Reformation. Apart from convents being closed, images of Mary were in many cases torn down or decapitated.

The Catholic Church meanwhile, responded to the Reformation with the Counter Reformation, which included a series of wars as well as exuberant baroque architecture and art. It was embraced as an affirmation of the faith, and new seminaries and orders were established to lead missions to far off lands. The importance of Marian devotion within Catholic life was kept firmly in place. Thus a new divide had arisen in Christianity: on the one hand Catholicism and Orthodoxy maintained Mary's place in Christian art and ritual; while on the other side, the new Protestant churches greatly reduced her significance. Many women were martyred during the Counter-Reformation, including the Guernsey Martyrs, three women martyred for Protestantism in 1556. One woman was pregnant and gave birth while being burned, the child was rescued but then ordered to be burned as well. Still other women, such as those living in the Defereggen Valley, were stripped of their children so they could be raised Catholic in an institution.

Renaissance and Baroque art produced new depictions of women in Christian art. According to Kenneth Clarke, while Mary had been in the Middle Ages "the supreme protectress of civilization" who had "taught a race of tough and ruthless barbarians the virtues of tenderness and compassion", during the Renaissance, Mary "became also the human mother in whom everyone could recognise qualities of warmth and love and approachability". These human qualities were presented by Catholic artists like Raphael, in his Madonna and Child portraits representing Mary with the infant Jesus, and Michelangelo in his pieta statue, depicting Mary cradling the dead body of Jesus following his crucifixion. During the Baroque period, religious depictions of women in Catholic Europe became not only exuberant, but often highly sensual, as with the Ecstasy of Saint Teresa by Gian Lorenzo Bernini.

== Modern times ==
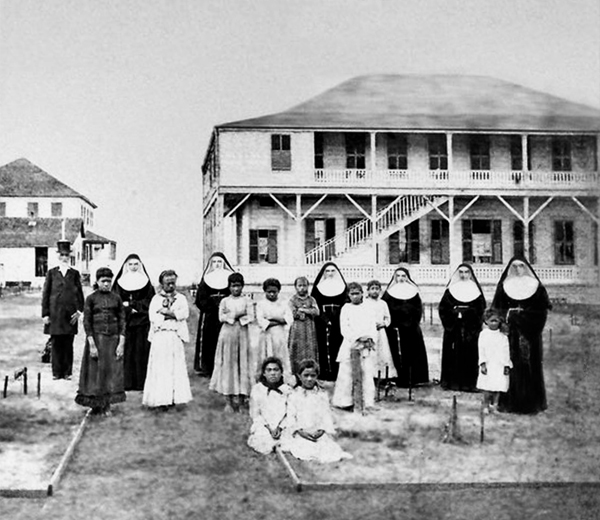
Catholic Sisters and the leper children of Hawaii in 1886. Catholic women played a central role in the developing or running of many the modern world's education and health care systems.

Amidst the backdrop of Industrial Revolution and expanding European empires, a number of notable educational and nursing religious institutes were established by or for Catholic women during the 17th–19th centuries; Christian women played a central role in the development or management of many the modern world's education and health care systems. Out of other Christian traditions arose women like Florence Nightingale, who assisted with the development of modern nursing. By the 21st century, several Protestant churches were ordaining women, but Christianity's heartlands were shifting away from Europe, and while vocations to the religious life were in decline in the West, conversions to Christianity and religious vocations were expanding rapidly in Africa and Asia.

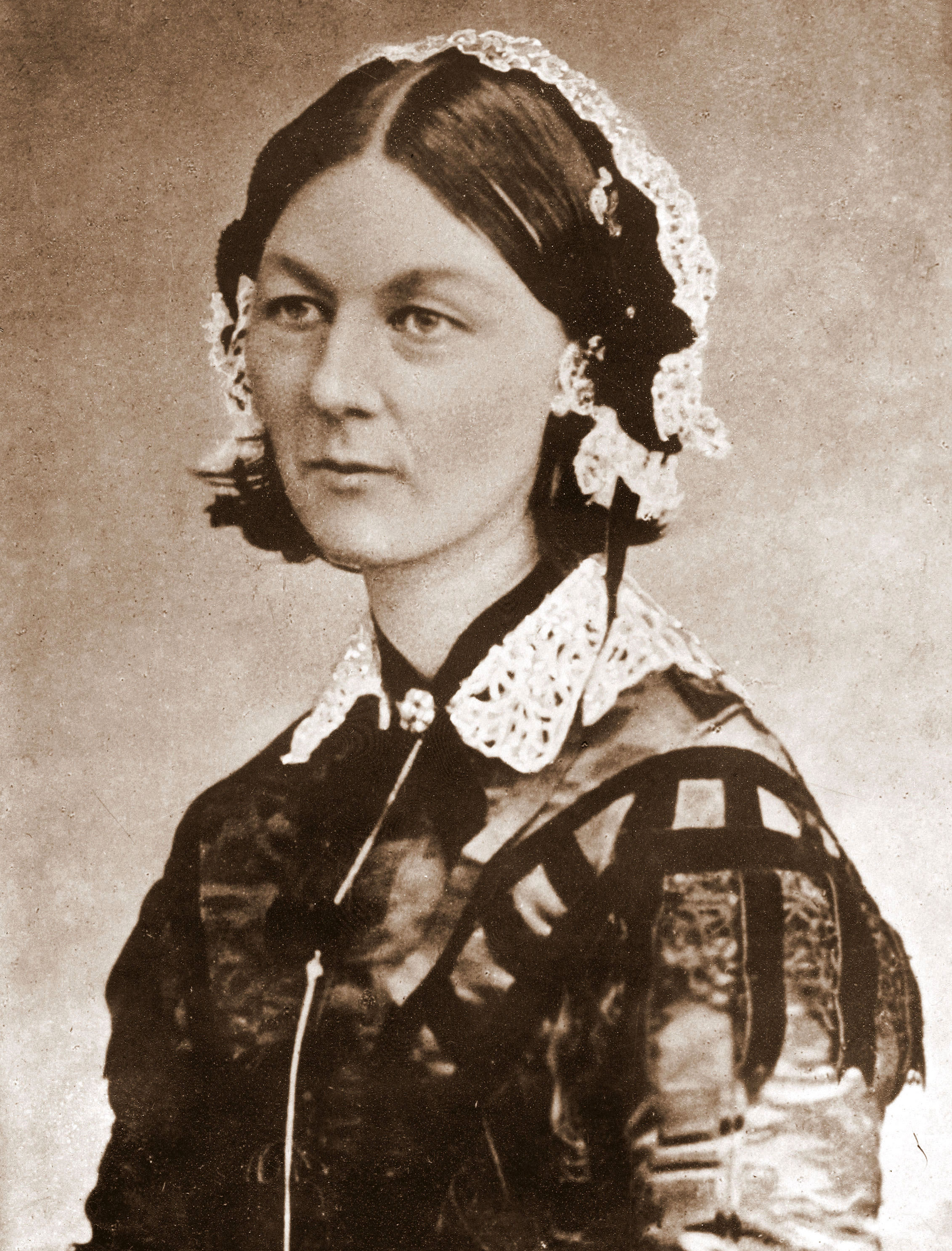
Anglican and nurse Florence Nightingale is widely credited with aiding the development of modern nursing.

Within Catholicism, the Sisters of Mercy was founded by Catherine McAuley in Dublin, Ireland, in 1831, and her nuns went on to establish hospitals and schools across the world. The Little Sisters of the Poor was founded in the mid-19th century by Saint Jeanne Jugan near Rennes, France, to care for the many impoverished elderly who lined the streets of French towns and cities. Australia's first canonised Saint, Mary MacKillop, co-founded the Sisters of St. Joseph of the Sacred Heart as educative religious institute for the poor in 1866 and, by the time of her death, her religious institute had established 117 schools and had opened orphanages and refuges for the needy.

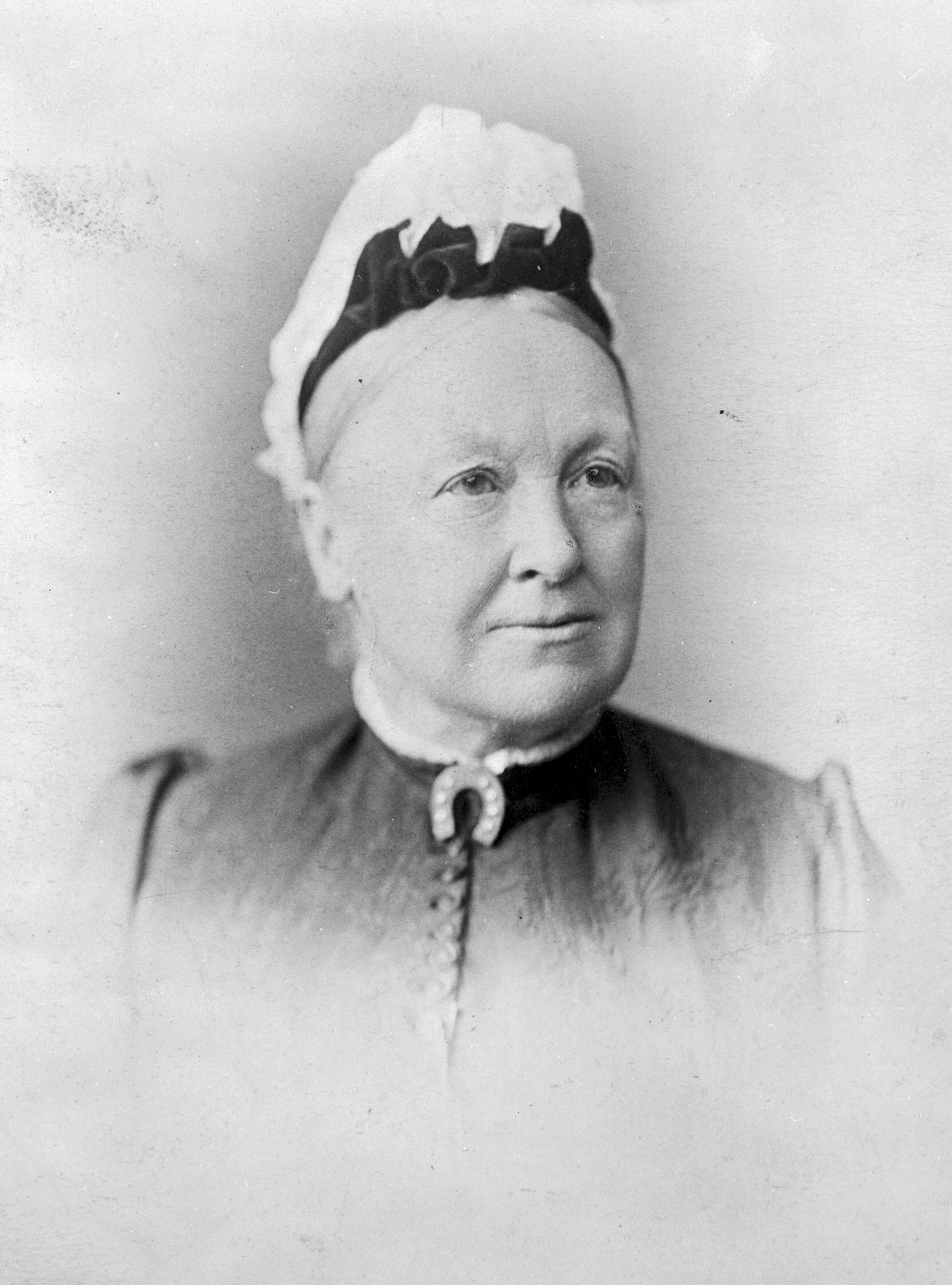
Catherine Helen Spence

Many Christian women were instrumental in the movement for women's suffrage which achieved its first successes in Britain's Australasian colonies at the close of the 19th century and spread across the democratic world. In the United States, the Quaker Grimké sisters were early advocates of abolitionism and women's rights. In Australia, Unitarian preacher Catherine Helen Spence led calls for women's suffrage, and ran for political office after the South Australian Parliament became the first modern jurisdiction to allow women to do so. In North America, organizations like the Woman's Christian Temperance Union called for the same reforms.

For much of the early twentieth century, Catholic women continued to join religious institutes in large numbers, where their influence and control was particularly strong in the running of primary education for children, high schooling for girls, and in nursing for hospitals, orphanages and aged care facilities. The Second Vatican Council of the 1960s liberalised the strictures of Catholic religious life; however, in the latter half of the 20th century, vocations for women in the West entered a steep decline.

A number of beatifications and canonisations took place of Catholic women from all over the world: St. Josephine Bakhita was a Sudanese slave girl who became a Canossian nun; St. Katharine Drexel (1858–1955) worked for Native and African Americans; Polish mystic St. Maria Faustina Kowalska (1905–1938) wrote her influential spiritual diary; and German nun Edith Stein who was murdered at Auschwitz.

President Ronald Reagan of the United States presents Mother Teresa with the Presidential Medal of Freedom at a White House ceremony, 1985.

A number of Christian women are recalled as martyrs of the Second World War struggle against Nazism. Catholic Poland suffered under Nazi occupation, and a number of women are recognised for their heroism during the period: including 8 religious sisters and several laywomen of Poland's 108 Martyrs of World War II and the 11 Sisters of the Holy Family of Nazareth murdered by the Gestapo in 1943 and known as the Blessed Martyrs of Nowogródek. Swedish born Elisabeth Hesselblad was listed among the "righteous among the nations" by Yad Vashem for her religious institute's work assisting Jews escape The Holocaust. She and two British women, Mother Riccarda Beauchamp Hambrough and Sister Katherine Flanagan, have been beatified for reviving the Swedish Bridgettine Order of nuns and hiding scores of Jewish families in their convent during Rome's period of occupation under the Nazis.

In modern times, after the Second Vatican Council, four Catholic women have been declared Doctors of the Church, indicating a re-appraisal of the role of women within the life of that Church: the 16th-century Spanish mystic St. Teresa of Ávila, the 14th Century Italian mystic St. Catherine of Siena, the 19th-century French nun St. Thérèse de Lisieux (called Doctor Amoris or Doctor of Love), and the 12th-century German nun St. Hildegard of Bingen.

While Catholicism and Orthodoxy adhered to traditional gender restrictions on ordination to the priesthood, ordination of women in Protestant churches has in recent decades become increasingly common. As of 1996, over half of all American Protestant denominations ordained women, though some restricted the official positions a woman can hold. For instance, some ordained women for the military or hospital chaplaincy but prohibited them from serving in congregational roles. However, one-third of all seminary students (and in some seminaries nearly half) are female.

The Salvation Army elected Evangeline Booth as its first female General (worldwide leader) in 1934. Army founder William Booth insisted on gender equality, writing in 1908 that "Every officer and soldier should insist upon the truth that woman is as important, as valuable, as capable and as necessary to the progress and happiness of the world as man", and women have been prominent in leadership positions in the history of the organisation.

Barbara Clementine Harris, became the first woman in the world to be ordained a bishop in the Episcopal Church in the US, part of the Anglican Communion.

British sovereigns including women—Elizabeth I, Mary II, Anne, Victoria and Elizabeth II—have received the position of the Supreme Governor of the Church of England upon their accessions to the throne.

Among the most famous women missionaries of the period was Mother Teresa of Calcutta, who was awarded the Nobel Peace Prize in 1979 for her work in "bringing help to suffering humanity". She was beatified in 2003, just six years after her death.

Many Christian women and religious have been prominent advocates in social policy debates—as with American nun Helen Prejean, a Sister of Saint Joseph of Medaille, who is a prominent campaigner against the death penalty and was the inspiration for the Hollywood film Dead Man Walking.

In 2016, it has been estimated that the female share (aged 20 years and over) of the World's Christian Population is between 52 and 53 percent. The Pew Research Center studied the effects of gender on religiosity throughout the world, finding that Christian women in 53 countries are generally more religious than Christian men. However, Christians of both genders in African countries are equally likely to regularly attend services. In 2020, it has been estimated that the female share of the World's Christian Population is around 51.6%.

== See also ==
- New Testament household code
- Women in the Bible
- Women in Christianity
- Jesus' interactions with women
- Paul the Apostle and women
- List of Christian women of the early church
- List of early Christian women presbyters
- Anglican Group for the Ordination of Women to the Historic Ministry existed from 1930 to 1978 to promote the equality of women in the church.
- Movement for the Ordination of Women

== Bibliography ==
- Blainey, Geoffrey (2011). A Short History of Christianity. Penguin Group. ISBN 978-0-670-07524-9.
- LaFosse, Mona Tokarek (2017). "Women, Children and House Churches". In Esler, Philip F. (ed.). The Early Christian World (2nd ed.). London: Routledge. pp. 385–406. ISBN 978-1-351-67829-2.
- MacHaffie, Barbara J. (2006). Her Story: Women in Christian Tradition. Fortress Press. ISBN 978-1-4514-0402-9.
- Mathieson, Erica A. (2014). Christian Women in the Greek Papyri of Egypt to 400 CE. Brepols. ISBN 978-2-503-55241-5.
- Pirri-Simonian, Teny (2008). "Prophetesses, Martyrs, Saints - Roles of Women in the Church Through the Ages". The Ecumenical Review. 60 (1–2): 59–71. doi:10.1111/j.1758-6623.2008.tb00246.x.
