= Euphrasius =

Euphrasius may refer to:

- Euphrasius of Illiturgis (fl. 1st century), Spanish Christian martyr, one of the Seven Apostolic Men
- Euphrasius (fl. 2nd century), Greek Christian martyr, one of the Seven Robbers
- Euphrasius (African bishop) (fl. 5th century), possibly martyred under the Vandals
- Euphrasius (died c. 515), bishop of Clermont-Ferrand
- Euphrasius of Antioch, Patriarch of Antioch from 521 to 526
- Euphrasius (fl. 6th century), bishop of Poreč, namesake of the Euphrasian Basilica, Poreč, Croatia
- Euphrasius (bishop of Lugo) (died 688)
