= Reccared (disambiguation) =

Reccared I (559–601) was Visigothic King of Hispania, Septimania and Galicia.

Reccared may also refer to:

- Reccared II, Visigothic king (ruled in 621)
- Reccared (Bishop of Lugo) (ruled in 885–923)
