= Adulfus =

Adulfus is a masculine given name. Notable people with the name include:

- Adulfus (bishop of Lugo) (fl. 830s), Galician clergyman
- Adulfus (bishop of Mondoñedo) (fl. 11th century), Galician bishop
