= Index Librorum Prohibitorum =

Publications deemed heretical for Catholics

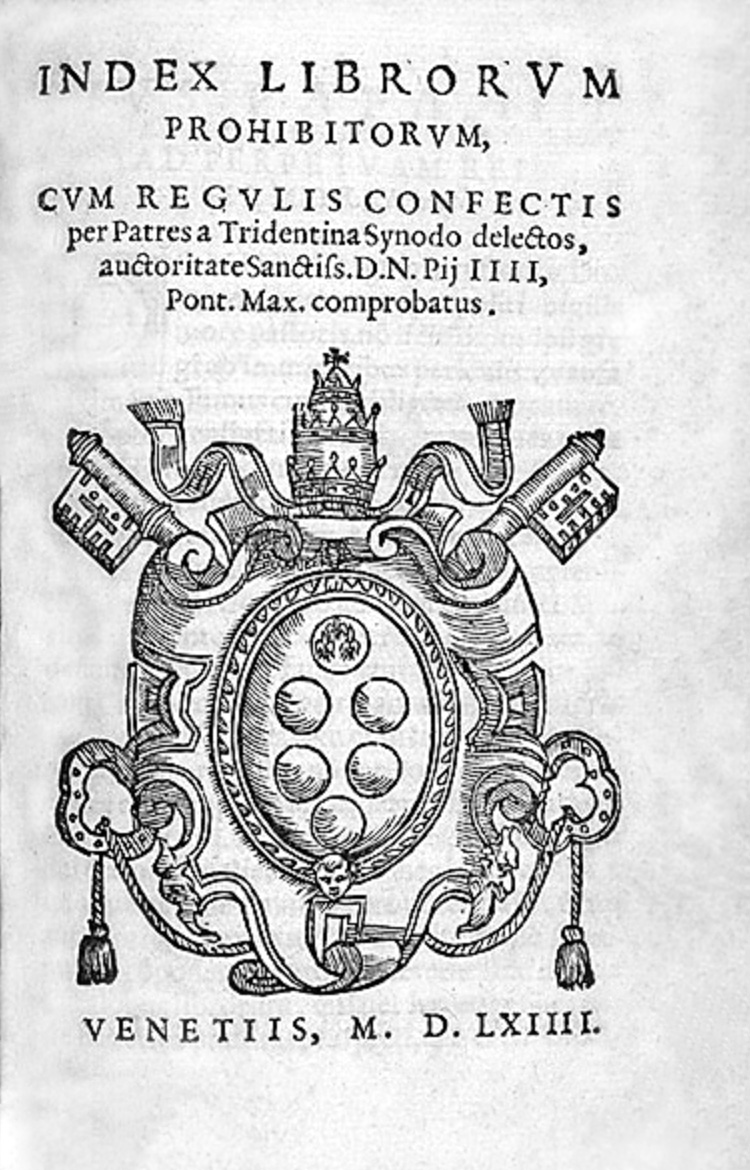
The master title page of Index Librorum Prohibitorum (in Venice, 1564)

The Index Librorum Prohibitorum (English: Index of Forbidden Books or Index of Prohibited Books) was a changing list of publications deemed heretical or contrary to morality by the Sacred Congregation of the Index (a former dicastery of the Roman Curia); Catholics were forbidden to print or read them, subject to the local bishop. Catholic states could enact laws to adapt or adopt the list and enforce it.

The Index was active from 1560 to 1966. It banned thousands of book titles and blacklisted publications, including the works of Europe's intellectual elites.

The Index condemned religious and secular texts alike, grading works by the degree to which they were deemed to be repugnant, potentially misleading or heretical to the Sacred Congregation of the Index at the time. The aim of the list was to protect church members from reading theologically, culturally, or politically disruptive books. At times such books included the works of theologians, such as Robert Bellarmine, and astronomers, such as Johannes Kepler's Epitome astronomiae Copernicanae (published in three volumes from 1618 to 1621), which was on the Index from 1621 to 1835; philosophers, such as Antonio Rosmini-Serbati and Immanuel Kant's Critique of Pure Reason (1781); and editions and translations of the Bible that had not been approved. Editions of the Index also contained the rules of the Church relating to the reading, selling, and pre-emptive censorship of books.

== Background and history ==
=== European restrictions on the right to print ===
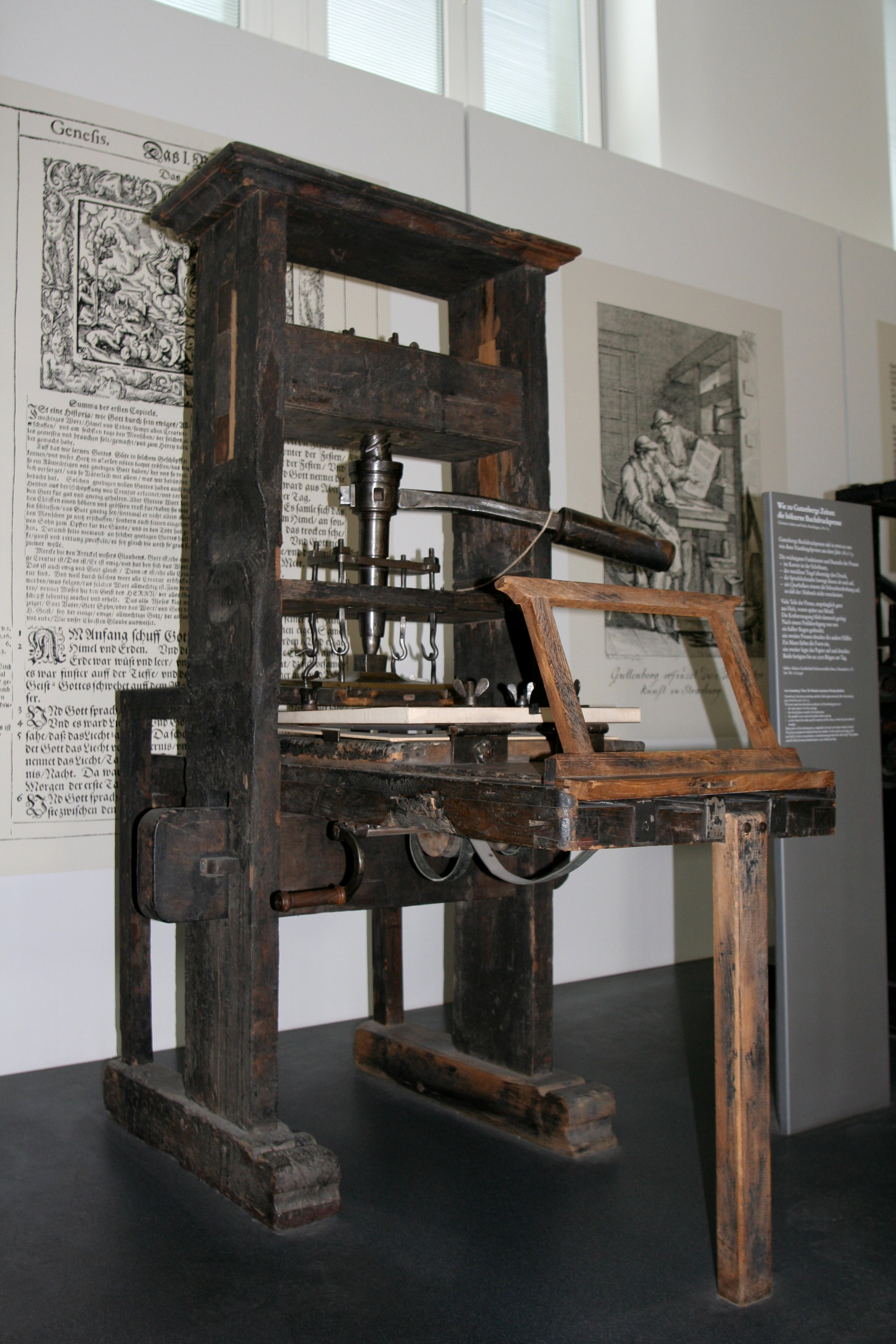
Printing press from 1811, Munich, Germany

The historical context in which the Index appeared involved the early restrictions on printing in Europe. The refinement of moveable type and the printing press by Johannes Gutenberg c. 1440 changed the nature of book publishing, and the mechanism by which information could be disseminated to the public. Books, once rare and kept carefully in a small number of libraries, could be mass-produced and widely disseminated.

In the 16th century, both the churches and governments in most European countries attempted to regulate and control printing because it allowed for the rapid and widespread circulation of ideas and information. The Protestant Reformation generated large quantities of polemical new writing by and within both the Catholic and Protestant camps, and religious subject matter was typically the area most subject to control. While governments and the church encouraged printing in many ways, which allowed the dissemination of Bibles and government information, works of dissent and criticism could also circulate rapidly. As a consequence, governments established controls over printers across Europe, requiring them to have official licenses to trade and produce books.

The early versions of prohibition indexes began to appear between 1529 and 1571. In the same time frame, in 1557 the English crown aimed to stem the flow of dissent by chartering the Stationers' Company. The right to print was restricted to the two universities (Oxford and Cambridge) and to the 21 existing printers in the city of London, which had between them 53 printing presses.

The French crown also tightly controlled printing, and the printer and writer Étienne Dolet was burned at the stake for atheism in 1546. The 1551 Edict of Châteaubriant comprehensively summarized censorship positions to date, and included provisions for unpacking and inspecting all books brought into France. The 1557 Edict of Compiègne applied the death penalty to heretics and resulted in the burning of a noblewoman at the stake. Printers were viewed as radical and rebellious, with 800 authors, printers and book dealers being incarcerated in the Bastille. At times, the prohibitions of church and state followed each other, e.g. René Descartes was placed on the Index in the 1660s and the French government prohibited the teaching of Cartesianism in schools in the 1670s.

The Copyright Act 1710 in Britain, and later copyright laws in France, eased this situation. Historian Eckhard Höffner claims that copyright laws and their restrictions acted as a barrier to progress in those countries for over a century, since British publishers could print valuable knowledge in limited quantities for the sake of profit. The German economy prospered in the same time frame since there were no restrictions.

=== Early indexes (1529–1571) ===
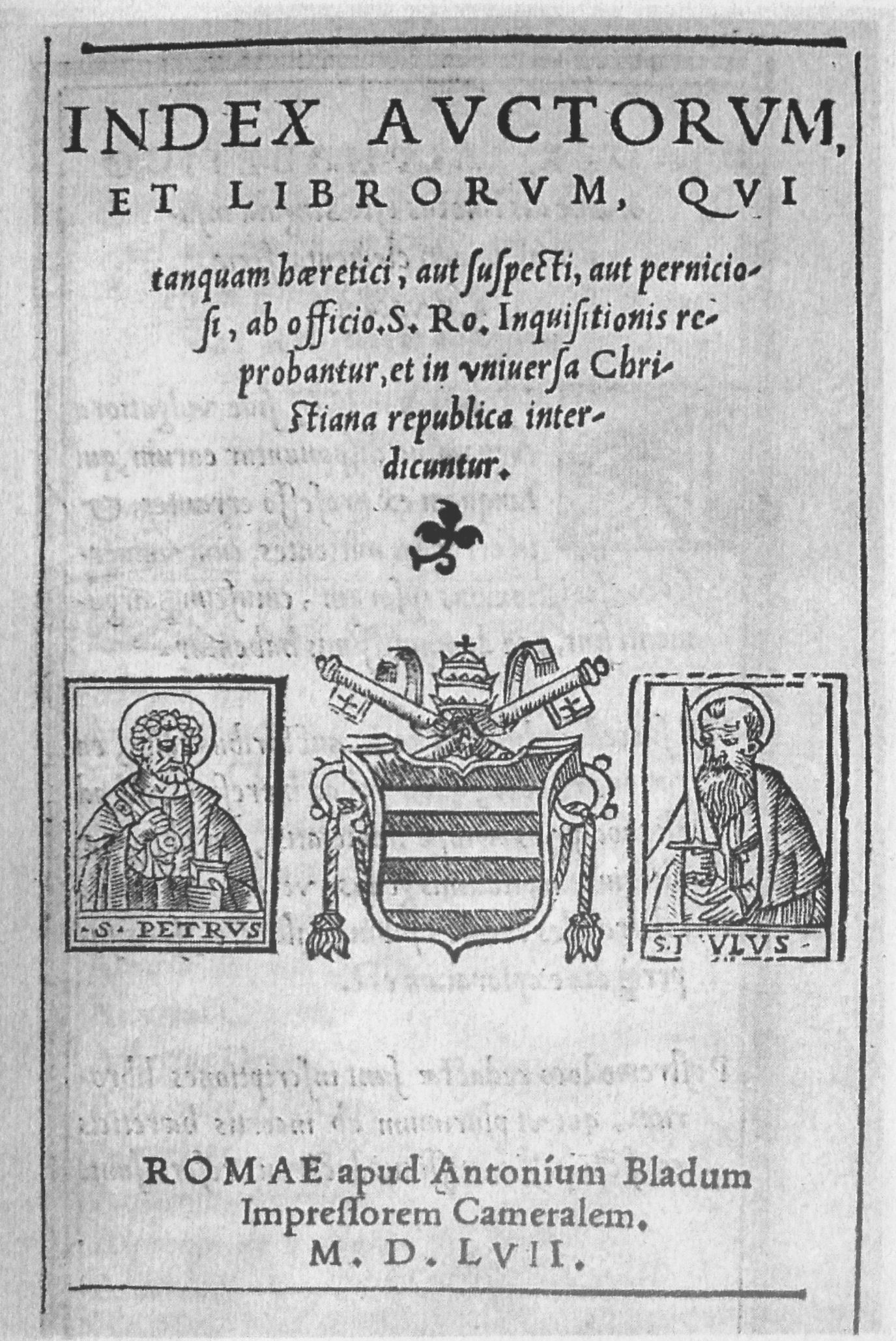
Title page of the first Papal Index, Index Auctorum et Librorum, published in 1557 by Antonio Blado and then withdrawn

The first list of the kind was not published in Rome, but in Catholic Netherlands (1529); Venice (1543) and Paris (1551) under the terms of the Edict of Châteaubriant followed this example. By the mid-century, in the tense atmosphere of wars of religion in Germany and France, both Protestant and Catholic authorities reasoned that only control of the press, including a catalogue of prohibited works, coordinated by ecclesiastic and governmental authorities, could prevent the spread of heresy.

Paul F. Grendler (1975) discusses the religious and political climate in Venice from 1540 to 1605. There were many attempts to censor the Venetian press, which at that time was one of the largest concentrations of printers. Both church and government held to a belief in censorship, but the publishers continually pushed back on the efforts to ban books and shut down printing. More than once the index of banned books in Venice was suppressed or suspended because various people took a stand against it.

The first Roman Index was printed in 1557 under the direction of Pope Paul IV (1555–1559), but then withdrawn for unclear reasons. In 1559, a new index was finally published, banning the entire works of some 550 authors in addition to the individual proscribed titles: (Note: They included everything by Pietro Aretino, Machiavelli, Erasmus and Rabelais.) "The Pauline Index felt that the religious convictions of an author contaminated all his writing." The work of the censors was considered too severe and met with much opposition even in Catholic intellectual circles; after the Council of Trent had authorised a revised list prepared under Pope Pius IV, the so-called Tridentine Index was promulgated in 1564; it remained the basis of all later lists until Pope Leo XIII, in 1897, published his Index Leonianus.

The blacklisting of some Protestant scholars even when writing on subjects a modern reader would consider outside the realm of dogma meant that, unless they obtained a dispensation, obedient Catholic thinkers were denied access to works including: botanist Conrad Gesner's Historiae animalium; the botanical works of Otto Brunfels; those of the medical scholar Janus Cornarius; to Christoph Hegendorff or Johann Oldendorp on the theory of law; Protestant geographers and cosmographers like Jacob Ziegler or Sebastian Münster; as well as anything by Protestant theologians like Martin Luther, John Calvin or Philipp Melanchthon. (Note: These authors are instanced by Schmitt 1991.) Among the inclusions was the Libri Carolini, a theological work from the 9th-century court of Charlemagne, which was published in 1549 by Bishop Jean du Tillet and which had already been on two other lists of prohibited books before being inserted into the Tridentine Index.

=== Sacred Congregation of the Index (1571–1917) ===
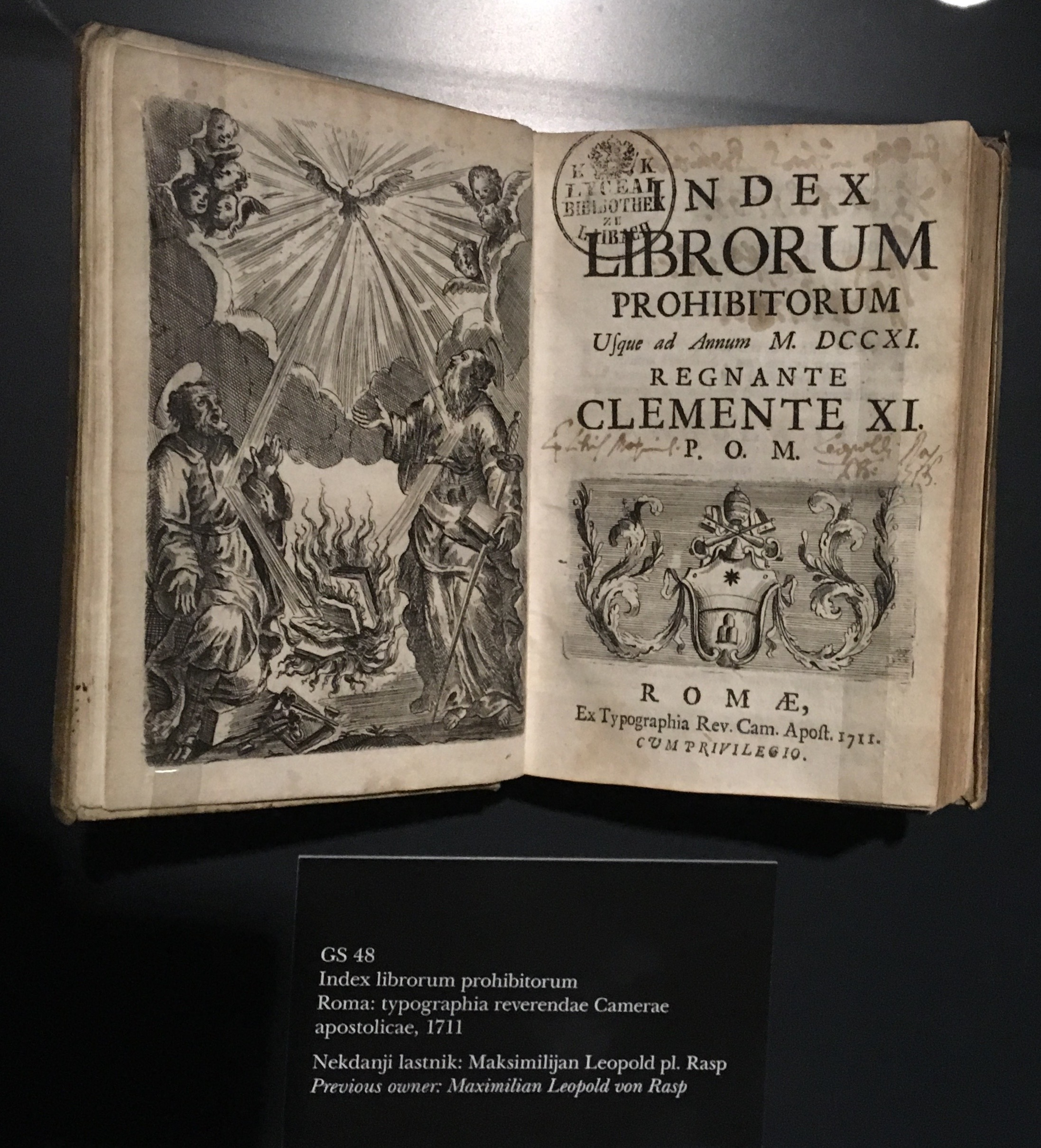
Title page of the Index Librorum Prohibitorum (1711)

In 1571, a special congregation was created, the Sacred Congregation of the Index, which had the specific task to investigate those writings that were denounced in Rome as being not exempt of errors, to update the list of Pope Pius IV regularly and also to make lists of required corrections in case a writing was not to be condemned absolutely but only in need of correction; it was then listed with a mitigating clause (e.g., donec corrigatur ('forbidden until corrected') or donec expurgetur ('forbidden until purged')).

Several times a year, the congregation held meetings. During the meetings, they reviewed various works and documented those discussions. In between the meetings was when the works to be discussed were thoroughly examined, and each work was scrutinized by two people. At the meetings, they collectively decided whether or not the works should be included in the Index. Ultimately, the pope was the one who had to approve of works being added or removed from the Index. It was the documentation from the meetings of the congregation that aided the pope in making his decision.

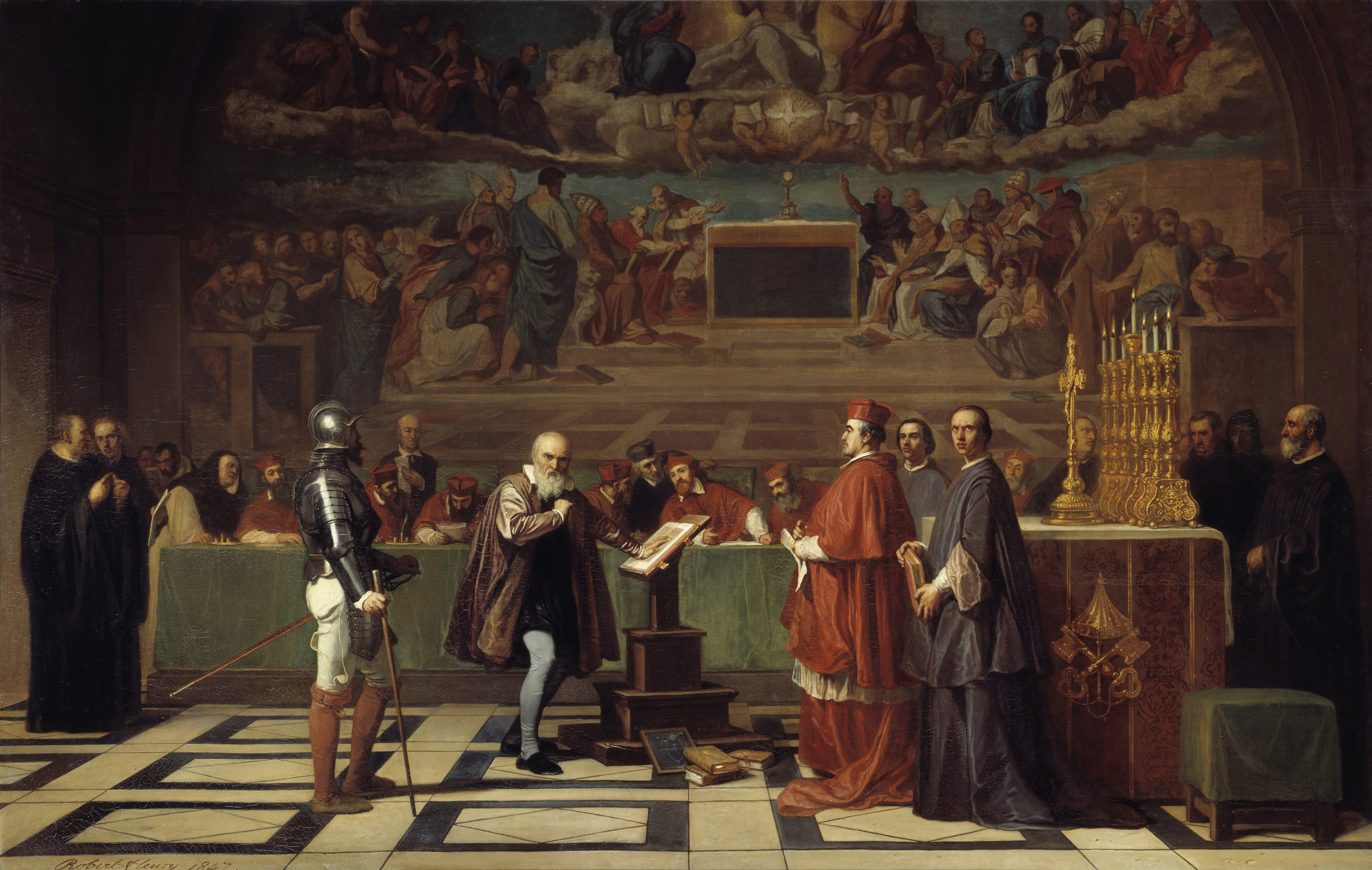
Galileo being condemned in 1633

This sometimes resulted in very long lists of corrections, published in the Index Expurgatorius, which was cited by Thomas James in 1627 as "an invaluable reference work to be used by the curators of the Bodleian Library when listing those works particularly worthy of collecting". Prohibitions made by other congregations (mostly the Holy Office) were simply passed on to the Congregation of the Index, where the final decrees were drafted and made public, after approval of the Pope (who always had the option to condemn an author personally—there are only a few examples of such condemnation, including those of Lamennais and Hermes).

An update to the Index was made by Pope Leo XIII, in the 1897 apostolic constitution Officiorum ac Munerum, known as the Index Leonianus. Subsequent editions of the Index were more sophisticated; they graded authors according to their supposed degree of toxicity, and they marked specific passages for expurgation rather than condemning entire books.

The Sacred Congregation of the Inquisition of the Roman Catholic Church later became the Holy Office, and since 1965 has been called the Dicastery for the Doctrine of the Faith. The Congregation of the Index was merged with the Holy Office in 1917, by the motu proprio Alloquentes Proxime of Pope Benedict XV; the rules on the reading of books were again re-elaborated in the new Codex Iuris Canonici. From 1917 onward, the Holy Office (again) took care of the Index.

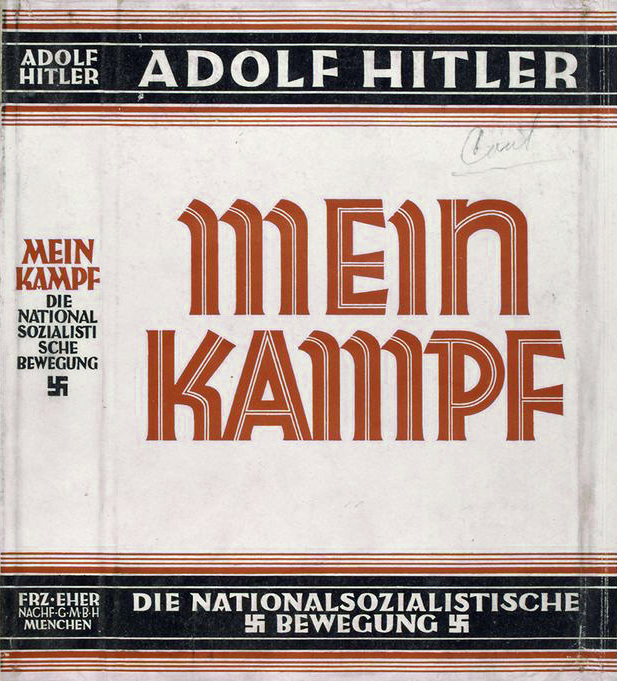
Although Nazi ideologist Alfred Rosenberg's book Myth of the Twentieth Century was placed on the Index, Adolf Hitler's book Mein Kampf was not.

=== Holy Office (1917–1966) ===
While individual books continued to be forbidden, the last edition of the Index to be published appeared in 1948. This 20th edition contained 4,000 titles censored for various reasons: heresy, moral deficiency, sexual explicitness, and so on. That some atheists, such as Schopenhauer and Nietzsche, were not included was due to the general (Tridentine) rule that heretical works (i.e., works that contradict Catholic dogma) are ipso facto forbidden. Some important works are absent simply because nobody bothered to denounce them. Many actions of the congregations were of a definite political content.

Among the denounced works of the period was the Nazi philosopher Alfred Rosenberg's Myth of the Twentieth Century for scorning and rejecting "all dogmas of the Catholic Church, and the fundamentals of the Christian religion". Markedly absent from the Index was Adolf Hitler's book Mein Kampf. After gaining access to the Vatican Apostolic Archive church historian Hubert Wolf discovered that Mein Kampf had been studied for three years but the Holy Office decided that it should not go on the Index because the author was a head of state. The Holy Office justified that decision by referring to chapter 13 of Paul the Apostle's Epistle to the Romans regarding state authority coming from God. However, somewhat later, the Vatican criticized Mein Kampf in the encyclical Mit Brennender Sorge (March 1937) about the challenges of the church in Nazi Germany.

=== Abrogation of Canonical Penalties (1966) ===
On 7 December 1965, Pope Paul VI issued the motu proprio Integrae servandae that reorganized the Holy Office as the Sacred Congregation for the Doctrine of the Faith. The Index was not listed as being a part of the newly constituted congregation's competence, leading to questioning whether it still was. This question was put to Cardinal Alfredo Ottaviani, pro-prefect of the congregation, who responded in the negative. The Cardinal also indicated in his response that there was going to be a change in the Index soon.

A June 1966 Congregation for the Doctrine of the Faith notification announced that, while the Index maintained its binding moral force, in that it taught Christians to beware, as required by the natural law itself, of those writings that could endanger faith and morality, it no longer had the force of ecclesiastical positive law with the associated penalties.

In a letter of 31 January 1985 to Cardinal Giuseppe Siri concerning Maria Valtorta’s The Poem of the Man-God, Cardinal Joseph Ratzinger, then prefect of the Congregation for the Doctrine of the Faith, referred back to the Congregation’s 1966 notification on the Index. According to canonist Andrew M. Pillari, the letter recalled the 1959 decree placing Valtorta’s work on the Index and the 1966 notification that, although the Index no longer had juridical force, it retained binding moral value as a warning to the conscience of the faithful. Ratzinger therefore stated that the diffusion and recommendation of such a work was not considered opportune, since its earlier condemnation had not been issued lightly.

The canon law of the Latin Church still recommends that works should be submitted to the judgment of the local ordinary (typically, the bishop) if they concern sacred scripture, theology, canon law, or church history, religion or morals. The local ordinary consults someone whom he considers competent to give a judgment and, if that person gives the nihil obstat ('nothing forbids'), the local ordinary grants the imprimatur ('let it be printed'). Members of religious institutes require the imprimi potest ('it can be printed') of their major superior to publish books on matters of religion or morals.

== Scope and impact ==
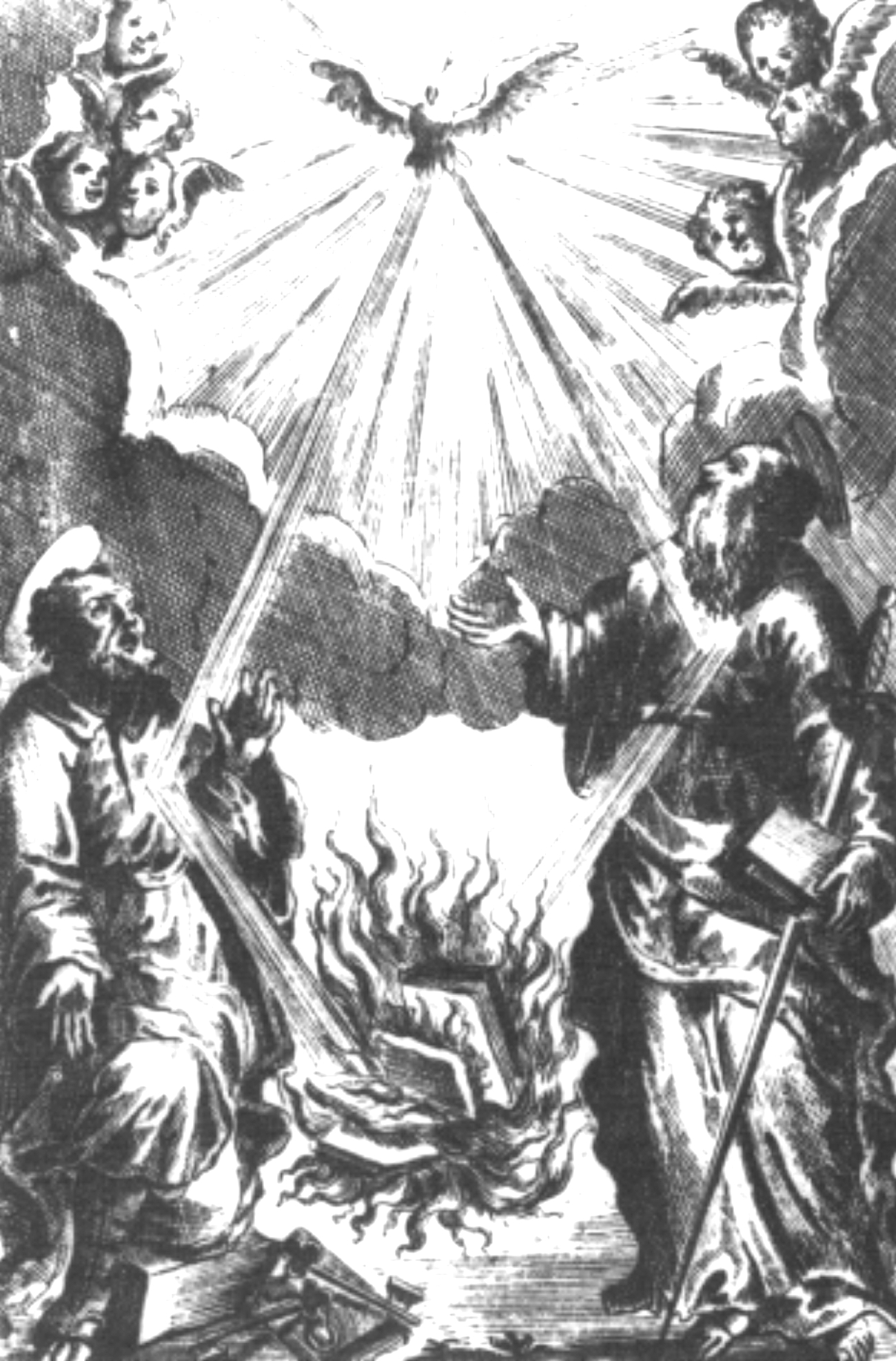
This 1711 illustration for the Index Librorum Prohibitorum depicts the Holy Ghost supplying the book-burning fire.

=== Censorship and enforcement ===
The Index was not simply a reactive work. Roman Catholic authors had the opportunity to defend their writings and could prepare a new edition with necessary corrections or deletions, either to avoid or to limit a ban. Pre-publication censorship was encouraged.

The Index was enforceable within the Papal States, but elsewhere only if adopted by the civil powers, as happened in several Italian states. Other areas adopted their own lists of forbidden books. In the Holy Roman Empire, book censorship, which preceded the publication of the Index, came under the control of the Jesuits at the end of the 16th century, but had little effect, since the German princes within the empire set up their own systems. In France it was French officials who decided what books were banned and the Church's Index was not recognized. Spain had its own Index Librorum Prohibitorum et Expurgatorum, which corresponded largely to the Church's, but also included a list of books that were allowed once the forbidden part (sometimes a single sentence) was removed or "expurgated".

=== Continued moral obligation ===
On 14 June 1966, the Congregation for the Doctrine of the Faith responded to inquiries it had received regarding the continued moral obligation concerning books that had been listed in the Index. The response spoke of the books as examples of books dangerous to faith and morals, all of which, not just those once included in the Index, should be avoided regardless of the absence of any written law against them. The Index, it said, retains its moral force "inasmuch as" (quatenus) it teaches the conscience of Christians to beware, as required by the natural law itself, of writings that can endanger faith and morals, but it (the Index of Forbidden Books) no longer has the force of ecclesiastical law with the associated censures.

The congregation thus placed on the conscience of the individual Christian the responsibility to avoid all writings dangerous to faith and morals, while at the same time abolishing the previously existing ecclesiastical law and the relative censures, without thereby declaring that the books that had once been listed in the various editions of the Index of Prohibited Books had become free of error and danger.

In a letter of 31 January 1985 to Cardinal Giuseppe Siri, regarding the book The Poem of the Man-God, Cardinal Joseph Ratzinger (then Prefect of the Congregation, who later became Pope Benedict XVI), referred to the 1966 notification of the Congregation as follows: "After the dissolution of the Index, when some people thought the printing and distribution of the work was permitted, people were reminded again in L'Osservatore Romano (15 June 1966) that, as was published in the Acta Apostolicae Sedis (1966), the Index retains its moral force despite its dissolution. A decision against distributing and recommending a work, which has not been condemned lightly, may be reversed, but only after profound changes that neutralize the harm which such a publication could bring forth among the ordinary faithful."

=== Changing judgments ===
The content of the Index Librorum Prohibitorum saw deletions as well as additions over the centuries. Writings by Antonio Rosmini-Serbati were placed on the Index in 1849 but were removed by 1855, and Pope John Paul II mentioned Rosmini's work as a significant example of "a process of philosophical enquiry which was enriched by engaging the data of faith". The 1758 edition of the Index removed the general prohibition of works advocating heliocentrism as a fact rather than a hypothesis.

Some of the scientific theories contained in works in early editions of the Index have long been taught at Catholic universities. For example, the general prohibition of books advocating heliocentrism was removed from the Index in 1758, but two Franciscan mathematicians had published an edition of Isaac Newton's Principia Mathematica (1687) in 1742, with commentaries and a preface stating that the work assumed heliocentrism and could not be explained without it.

== Listed works and authors ==
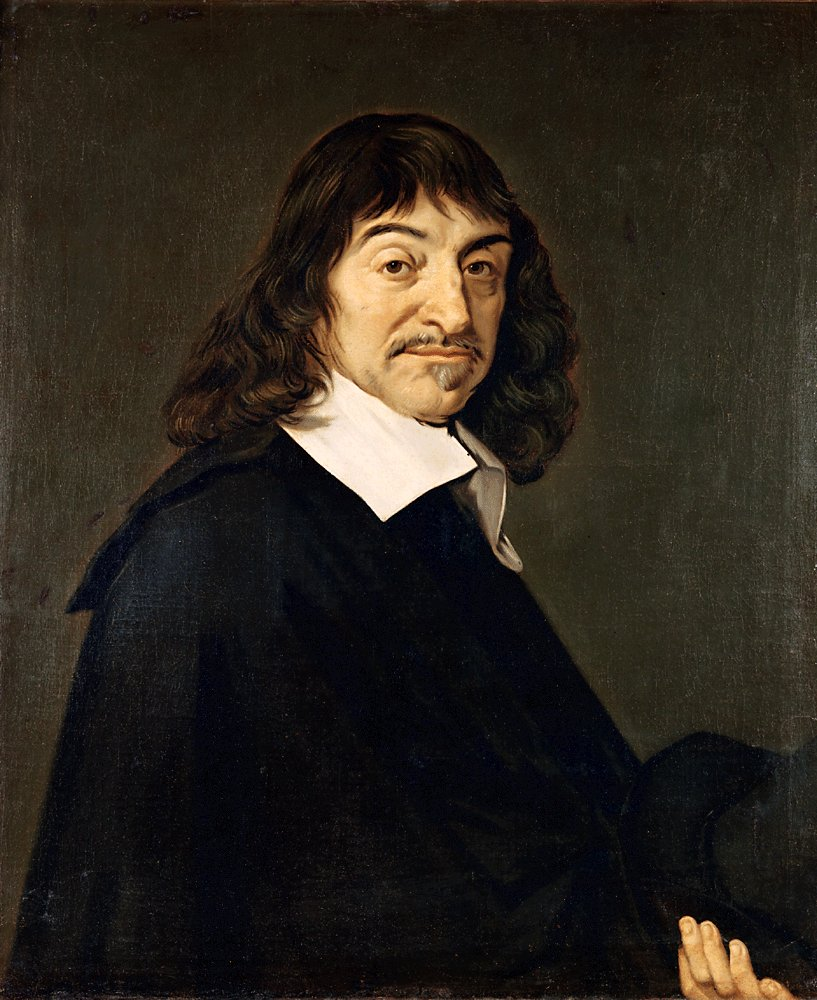
René Descartes went on the Index in 1663.

Noteworthy figures on the Index include Simone de Beauvoir, Nicolas Malebranche, Jean-Paul Sartre, Michel de Montaigne, Voltaire, Denis Diderot, Victor Hugo, Jean-Jacques Rousseau, André Gide, Nikos Kazantzakis, Emanuel Swedenborg, Baruch Spinoza, Desiderius Erasmus, (See Legacy and evaluations of Erasmus), Immanuel Kant, David Hume, René Descartes, Francis Bacon, Thomas Browne, John Milton, John Locke, Nicolaus Copernicus, Niccolò Machiavelli, Galileo Galilei, Blaise Pascal, Jan Thadeus and Hugo Grotius. The first woman to be placed on the list was Magdalena Haymairus in 1569, who was listed for her children's book Die sontegliche Episteln über das gantze Jar in gesangsweis gestellt (Sunday Epistles on the whole Year, put into hymns). Other women include Anne Askew, Olympia Fulvia Morata, Ursula of Munsterberg (1491–1534), Veronica Franco, and Paola Antonia Negri (1508–1555). Contrary to a popular misconception, Charles Darwin's works were never included.

In many cases, an author's opera omnia (complete works) were forbidden. However, the Index stated that the prohibition of someone's opera omnia did not preclude works that were not concerned with religion and were not forbidden by the general rules of the Index. This explanation was omitted in the 1929 edition, which was officially interpreted in 1940 as meaning that opera omnia covered all the author's works without exception.

Cardinal Ottaviani stated in April 1966 that there was too much contemporary literature and the Sacred Congregation for the Doctrine of the Faith could not keep up with it.

== See also ==
- Archive of the Dicastery for the Doctrine of the Faith
- Book censorship
- Clericalism
- Index of Repudiated Books
- Literary inquisition
- Syllabus of Errors
