= Council of Orange =

Council of Orange may refer to:

- Council of Orange (441), a synod dealing with the obligations of the clergy
- Council of Orange (529), a synod condemning Semi-Pelagianism
