= Hermenegild II (bishop of Lugo) =

Hermenegildus II (r. 950–985) was a medieval Galician clergyman.

Catholic Church titles
Preceded by Erus	Bishop of Lugo; 950–985	Succeeded by Pelagius
