= Froila (bishop of Lugo) =

Galician clergyman

Froila (in office 875–883) was a medieval Galician clergyman.

Catholic Church titles
Preceded by Gladilanus	Bishop of Lugo; 875–883	Succeeded by Flaianus
