= Becila =

Becila (? - 589 -?) was a Medieval Hispanic church clergyman Galician and an Arian bishop of Lugo in the late sixth century.

== Biography ==
In 585, the King Visigoth Leovigild conquered the Suebi kingdom, imposing Arianism as the official religion. The Catholic bishop of the Roman Catholic Diocese of Lugo Nitigius was banished and Becila was appointed in his place. Simultaneously the diocese, which from the First Council of Lugo metropolitan year was 569, lost this status in order to become suffragan of Roman Catholic Archdiocese of Braga. In 589, and under the reign of Reccared, held the Third Council of Toledo in which Catholicism was declared the only religion throughout the Visigothic kingdom and restored at their respective headquarters Catholic bishops banished by Leovigild. Becila was one of the bishops in this council who abjured Arianism, and it is assumed that, after his conversion, he interested given the diocese after the death of the aged Nitigisio, as in other similar cases, although there is evidence that this will take place.

Titles of Chalcedonian Christianity
Preceded by Nitigius	Bishop of Lugo c. 589	Succeeded by Vasconius
