= Flaianus =

Galician clergyman

Flaianus (in office 883–885) was a medieval Galician clergyman.

Catholic Church titles
Preceded by Froila	Bishop of Lugo; 883–885	Succeeded by Recaredus
