= Nitigius =

Medieval Galician clergyman

Nitigius (? - 570-585 - ?) was a medieval Galician clergyman.

Catholic Church titles
Preceded by Agrestius	Bishop of Lugo; 570–585	Succeeded by Becila
