= Erus (bishop of Lugo) =

Galician bishop

Erus of Lugo (924–941) was a medieval Galician clergyman.

Catholic Church titles
Preceded by Recaredus	Bishop of Lugo; 924–941	Succeeded by Hermenegildus II

== Bibliography ==
- Consello da Cultura Galega (ed.), Documentos da Catedral de Lugo, (Santiago de Compostela, 1998)
