= Jan Thadeus =

Czech Lutheran preacher

Jan Thadeus Meziříčský (Latin: Johannes Thaddeus, German: Johann Thaddäus; died 13 January 1652) was a Czech Lutheran preacher, writer and humanist.

== Biography ==
The birthplace and date of birth of Jan Thadeus Meziříčský is unknown. The name Meziříčský must refer to one of the several places called Meziříčí in what is today the Czech Republic. Thadeus then studied in Prostějov, Prague and then at the University of Wittenberg. He was enrolled at the University of Wittenberg on 24 May 1589, along with Jan Theodor Sixt of Ottersdorf and other contemporaries of Bohemian humanism. He did not finish his studies at the University of Wittenberg for financial reasons and chose the ecclesiastical path. He wrote many books and writings, in vernacular languages and in Latin. His texts include explanations of marital status, such as origin, causes, blessings and the cross.

On 28 March 1591, he was ordained a Utraquist preacher. In 1593 he became chaplain in Kutná Hora and then in various places, such as in the Old Town of Prague, in Turnov, in 1605 in Mnichovo Hradiště; from 1610 to 1618, he was a preacher of the Church of St. Barbara in Kutná Hora. From 1618 to 1623, he was dean of Jičín. When the church was ceded to the Jesuits, he resigned from his post but remained in Jičín. In 1628 he went into exile and in 1630 he settled in Zittau, where his house became a centre of exile. He came back to Prague during the Saxon invasion, but returned to Zittau soon after.

He went to exile from place to place between 1640 and in 1641 he swore an oath of loyalty to the landowner of Zittau. His first wife Marie Rosendörfer died on 20 September 1638. The Zittau Consistory tried to prohibit the reception of new refugees and to dissolve the suffering Czech congregation, which also included people from Bohemia. In Zittau, he was suspected of Calvinism and was investigated because of his book Conciliatorium Biblicum, written while he was inside of the Netherlands and more specifically in Breda and published in Amsterdam in 1648. He stayed in Breda for some time in the hope of finding a job. When his hopes began to fade, he dedicated the book to the Zittau City Council, where he wanted to stay. During the investigation, no one proved the Calvinist ideas. He was very popular among the exiles, but the clergy of the city did not like him and continued to suspect him of Calvinism. He died during the inquest on 13 January 1652 in Zittau. A public funeral was refused, he was buried after 9 p.m., probably in the place where the abbey cemetery is located today. A tombstone was erected for his second wife Alžběta Stoltze, who died in Zittau on 13 April 1661.

One of his writings, Conciliatorium Biblicum was placed in the Index librorum prohibitorum by decree on 27 September 1678.
