= Vasconius =

Medieval Galician clergyman

Vasconius (r. 633–646) was a medieval Galician clergyman.

Catholic Church titles
Preceded by Becila	Bishop of Lugo; 633–646	Succeeded by Hermenfred
