= Potencius =

Potencius (?-695-?) was a medieval Galician clergyman.

Catholic Church titles
Preceded by Euphrasius	Bishop of Lugo ?-695–?	Succeeded by Odoarius
