= Hermenfred (bishop of Lugo) =

Hermenfredus (born 633) was a medieval Galician clergyman.

Catholic Church titles
Preceded by Vasconius	Bishop of Lugo; 657–?	Succeeded by Rectogenis
