= Pelagius (bishop of Lugo) =

Bishop of Lugo

Pelagius of Lugo (985–1000) was a medieval Galician clergyman.

Catholic Church titles
Preceded by Hermenegildus II	Bishop of Lugo; 985–1000	Succeeded by Suarius I
