= Gladilanus =

Medieval Galician clergyman

Gladilanus (842/850 – 861) was a medieval Galician clergyman.

Catholic Church titles
Preceded by Odoarius	Bishop of Lugo; 842/850–861	Succeeded by Froila
