= Adulfus (bishop of Lugo) =

Adulfus (?-832-?) was a medieval Galician clergyman.

Catholic Church titles
Preceded by Odoarius	Bishop of Lugo ?-832–?	Succeeded by Gladilanus
