= Reconquest of Galicia =

740s and 750s Christian campaign in Spain

The Kingdom of Asturias in 800, including Galicia.

The Reconquest of Galicia was the recovery of Galicia in the north-west of the Iberian Peninsula to Christian rule, by King Alfonso I of Asturias, son-in-law and second successor of Pelagius.

== History ==
In 711, the Iberian Peninsula, then entirely controlled by the Visigothic Kingdom, was invaded by the troops of the Umayyad Caliphate, and in the Battle of Guadalete Tariq ibn Ziyad defeated King Rodrigo, who died in action. The Muslims would then quickly occupy the peninsula up to the Cantabrian Mountains. In 715, generals Tariq and Musa ibn Nusayr sailed up the Ebro River with their troops. Musa took the road to Zaragoza, while Tariq invaded the Basque Country. Once the two armies had reunited, they marched towards León and Galicia, a province that stretched as far south as the Douro River.

The invasion of Galicia by Tariq and Musa took place between 713 and 716. After capturing Braga, the Muslims crossed the Minho River. Once across the river, the episcopal city of Tui put up resistance but was assaulted and sacked, with many of its inhabitants being reduced to slavery, including the bishop and many clergymen. Ourense also resisted but was assaulted and destroyed. Lugo, the only fortified city in the region, surrendered and was occupied, but its best citizens were sent to Africa. Bretonnia was destroyed. Musa ibn Nusayr was in Astorga or Lugo when he received orders from Caliph al-Walid to return to Damascus.

Not all of Galicia was occupied, as Muslim presence was limited to the larger cities. The mountainous lands of western, central and northern Galicia did not come under the authority of Cordoba. Many people from the south, from Toledo to Coimbra, including the bishops of Lamego, Tui and Coimbra, took refuge in the lands of the diocese of Iria Flavia, between the Ulla and Minho rivers, which remained free from Muslim occupation.

Most of the Muslim troops in Galicia were Berbers. In 740, the Berbers garrisons north of the Douro rebelled against the Caliphate due to injustices in the allocation of land among other things, and most of their numbers appear to have abandoned the cities or castles they had occupied and headed south. Pelagius died in 737 and his successor, Favila, was killed by a bear two years later. He was succeeded by his brother-in-law, Alfonso I of Asturias, who was responsible for the reconquest of Galicia.

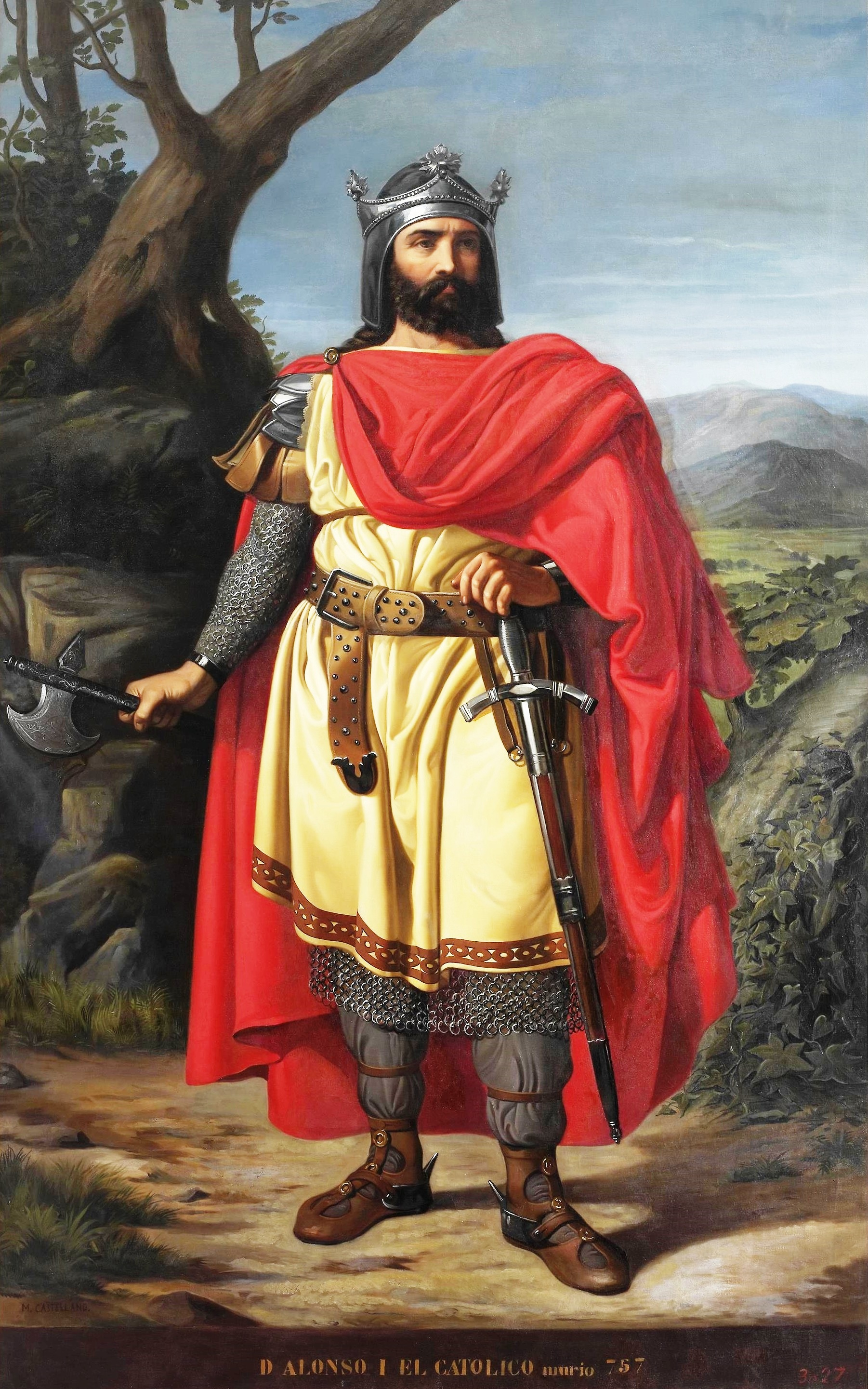
King Alfonso I of Asturias, 19th century painting at the Museo del Prado.

In 741 or 742, Alfonso took advantage of the Berber rebellion and the reduced number of Muslim soldiers in Galicia to launch a series of campaigns west and southwest into the region, as far as the Duero. Lugo was reoccupied by Alfonso I without resistance. Tui and Orense were also reconquered. The diocese of Iria Flavia recognised the authority of Alfonso I. Braga and Chaves, in the modern-day territory of Portugal were also taken. During his reign, all of Galicia was recovered from the Muslims.

After the territory in the northwest had been secured, León, Astorga, and points as far south as Salamanca to the southeast were also captured. Alfonso also executed the Muslim garrisons left behind that were captured but as he did not have enough men to settle and defend the territory so far south, he had the Christian residents relocated further north, resulting in a vast no-mans-land between Asturias and Al-Andalus. Alfonso repopulation efforts resulted in the reestablishment of the episcopal see of Lugo under the guidance of Bishop Odoarius, a North-African or Andalusi cleric who had headed north after hearing of Pelayos victories and Alfonsos ascent to the throne.

== See also ==
- Gallaecia
- Kingdom of Asturias
- Reconquista
- Asturias in the Reconquista
- Portugal in the Reconquista
- Kingdom of Galicia
- History of Galicia
- Umayyad conquest of the Iberian Peninsula
- Berber Revolt
- Repoblación
