= Agrestius =

Agrestius (fl. 433–441) was the bishop of Lugo in the Roman province of Gallaecia. He attended the Council of Orange in the year 441. He is usually identified with the author of the Versus Agresti episcopi de fide ad Avitum episcopum, a poem and letter addressed to Avitus, then prefect of Gaul. The chronicler Hydatius, in his account of 433, suggests that Agrestius had Priscillianist leanings.

Titles of the Great Christian Church
Preceded by new foundation	Bishop of Lugo; 433–?	Succeeded by Nitigius
