= Magdalena Heymair =

German teacher and Lutheran evangelical poet

- Born: c. 1535; Regensburg, Bavaria
- Died: after 1586
- Occupation: Teacher
- Spouse: Wilhelm Heymair
- Children: 1
- Writing career
- Language: Middle Bavarian
- Genre: Poetry
- Notable works: Die sontegliche Episteln über das gantze Jar in gesangsweis gestellt, Das Buechlein Jesu Syrachs, Das Buch der Apostolischen Geschichten

Magdalena Heymair (variously Heymairin, Haymerin, Haymairus; c. 1535 – after 1586) was a teacher and Lutheran evangelical poet who wrote in the Middle Bavarian dialect. Born a Roman Catholic, she converted to evangelical Lutheranism. In her educational songs for children, she often emphasized the role of women in the Bible. Magdalena Heymair is the first and only woman prior to the 18th century to publish pedagogical writings for elementary teaching. She is also the first woman to have her works listed as heretical in the Index Librorum Prohibitorum (1569).

== Life ==
Magdalena Heymair was born in Regensburg and raised in the Roman Catholic faith. Little is known about her family of origin, her marriage, or her death. In her letters and her books she mentions her school-teacher husband, Wilhelm Heymair, and her son. She apparently became a teacher herself to supplement the family's meagre income.

Magdalene Heymair obtained a position teaching the daughters of Katharina von Degenberg (born von Freyberg, d. 9 January 1586) in Straubing. The family was wealthy and well-connected. Katharina was the widow of Hans VII, Herr zu Degenberg, Schwarzach, & Weissenstein (d. 1551), a chief judge. One of her daughters, Katharina, married Ulrich III, Graf zu Ortenburg in 1558 and died 4 October 1570. A second daughter, Magdalena, married Johann Andreas von Wolfstein, Freiherr zu Obersulzburg (1541–1585) on 25 January 1569 and died 3 June 1597. Another daughter, Maria, may have married Freiherr Georg von Maxlrain, Herr zu Hohenwaldeck in 1586 and died in 1610. Heymair's writings are dedicated to "numerous, mostly noble ladies" including Katharina von Degenberg, born von Freyberg, and Magdalena vom Wolffstein, born von Degenberg.

Katharina was also the daughter of Wolf von Freyberg, Herr zu Mickhausen, and was raised in the majority Protestant free imperial city of Augsburg. Katharina hosted a "Frauenzimmer" ("women's room") where women could read and discuss Lutheranism and evangelical ideas. Among those attending were Brigitta Weinzierl, a councilman's wife, and Magdalena Heymair. As a result of their meetings, the women ceased to attend Roman Catholic Mass, choosing instead to sing and read from Lutheran books. A number of the women, including Heymair, eventually had to flee from Straubing because of the negative public response to their conversion.

"Eternal praise be to God, for I diligently considered her thought-provoking questions, and the Spirit of God often came to aid my contemplation, and led me to the Truth." Magdalena Heymair (translated).

While Louis VI, Elector Palatine was governor of the Upper Palatinate, Lutheranism was preferred over Calvinism. Magdalena Heymair obtained a position as a schoolmistress at a girls' school in Cham. She and her husband Wilhelm Heymair lived there from 1566 to 1570. She corresponded with Nicolaus Gallus, a leader of the Lutheran Reformation in Regensburg, and was a close friend of the town's preacher, Willibald Ramsbeck. While at Cham, Magdalena Heymair began to write poetry which she set to music and used in her lessons.

Magdalena Heymair used the settings of children's poet Nikolaus Herman as a model for her compositions. In the preface to her first book, she writes that she was inspired by Die sonntags-evangelia of Nikolaus Herman, Kantor in Joachimsthal. Finding that he had written at the request of a school teacher, she asked God for the grace to arrange the daily lessons for singing. Her manuscript was completed by 1561, and published in 1568 as Die sontegliche Episteln über das gantze Jar in gesangsweis gestellt ('Sunday Epistles on the whole Year, put to the test’.) Further editions followed in 1569, 1578, 1579 and 1733.

With this work, Magdalena Heymair became the first and only woman to publish pedagogical writings for elementary teaching prior to the 18th century. That she was able to publish is remarkable. Her contemporary Josua Opitz wrote, in a preface to Heymair's second book, "This must be the end of time, when also women are publishing books".

Although the German school at Cham had been exclusively assured to Heymair with the support of the Lutheran Council, the succession of Elector Friedrich III resulted in the promotion of more Calvinist beliefs. A Calvinist teacher, Veit Wurtzer from Landshut, was allowed to establish a competing school. Although Magdalena Heymair appealed to superintendent Nicolaus Gallus in February 1570, arguing that the town was too small to support two schools, she was unsuccessful. The Heymairs had to leave Cham. Wilhelm Heymair applied unsuccessfully for employment in Amberg, and it has been assumed that he died not long afterward.

By the end of 1570, Magdalena Heymair held a position as a schoolmistress in Regensburg. She continued to write and publish as well as teach. Many of her manuscripts were circulated in handwritten copies before they appeared in printed editions. In 1571, her second book, Das Buechlein Jesu Syrachs (‘The Book of Jesus Syrach’) was printed, with further editions in 1572, 1573, 1578 (2x) and 1586. In 1573, Magdalena Heymair's third book Das Buch der Apostolischen Geschichten (‘The Book of Apostolic Stories’) was circulated in handwritten form. It appeared in handwritten form again in 1574, and was printed in 1586. Das Buoch Tobiae ('The Book of Tobias') appeared in 1580 and was first printed in 1586.

In 1580 Magdalena Heymair was a governess in the household of Hans Rueber zu Pixendorf (1529–1584) and his wife Judith Rueber (born von Friedensheim, 1542–1588) at Grafenwörth. After Judith Rueber was widowed in 1586, she appointed Hieronymus Deubener (Peristerius), who Magdalena Heymair knew, as her court preacher. In 1586, Grafenwörth was leased. After this time Magdalena Haymair lived at one of the land-holdings of the Rueber family in Kaschau.

== Works ==
Heymair's major works are Die sontegliche Episteln ('Sunday Epistles', 1568), Das Buechlein Jesu Syrachs ('The Book of Jesus Syrach', 1571), Das Buch der Apostolischen Geschichten ('The Book of Apostolic Stories', 1573); and Das Buoch Tobiae ('The Book of Tobias', 1580).

Magdalena Heymair wrote her works in the Middle Bavarian dialect. She was well-educated in both theology and literature. The phrasing and rhymes of her songs are partly influenced by the fact that she adapted the lyrics of her songs to predefined melodies, rather than composing her own settings. She drew upon works of poets and composers such as Ludwig Helmbold, Paul Hofhaimer, Heinrich Isaac, Jakob Regnart, Hans Sachs, Ludwig Senfl, and Johann Walter. She differed from others of her time in using secular as well as religious songs as settings for her religious verses.

Magdalena Heymair is the first and only woman whose pedagogical writings, specifically written for elementary teaching, were published before the 18th century. She took material from Biblical history and transformed it into a childlike rhyming form suitable for elementary teaching. She structured her songs into stanzas to make them easier to memorize. In the elementary schools in Protestant territories, pupils generally learned to read using primers, the Bible and the hymnal. It was a normal part of instruction to practice and sing well-known hymns and other songs used in liturgical contexts. Students commonly memorized songs and biblical passages as well as their catechism. Magdalena Heymair developed her own teaching materials, setting biblical passages to music. She wrote five books of biblical songs, and other songs for girls. She mediated the biblical texts, emphasizing women of the Bible and the role of women in the New Testament and the Book of Acts.

One of her short pieces, "Das Gaistliche A. B. C." encourages readers in alphabetical stanzas to live a godly life. The final stanza (translated as follows) gives a sense of her ability to communicate at a child's level:

"We all will have to face / Christ’s Day of Judgment. / When you then will be able / To recite this ABC correctly / And without any lamentation / And if you will have lived according to its teachings / You will enjoy the fruits of it. / The enemy will be furious / When you will enter God's realm." Magdalena Heymair (translated).

Heymair justified her writing as an exercise of the priestly right and responsibility that, according to Lutheran belief, belonged to all Christians. She saw it as both an act of service to others, particularly "women, maidens, and children", and an act of thanksgiving to God. The impact of her writings, used to educate children in both homes and schools, was widespread. Preacher Willibald Ramsbeck wrote of her:

"In the number of holy Christian matrons, or God's prophetesses, ... cleansed by the blood of Christ and sanctified by the Holy Spirit, I not unjustly reckon the honorable, virtuous, and spirit-filled Frau Magdalena Heymair." Willibald Ramsbeck (translated).

Magdalena Heymair was the first woman whose works were placed on the Catholic Index Librorum Prohibitorum. She is listed as "Magdalena Haymairus" in the first class of heretical writers as early as 1569. Other women listed later include Anne Askew, Olympia Fulvia Morata, Ursula of Munsterberg (1491–1534), Veronica Franco, and Paola Antonia Negri (1508–1555).
