= Rectogenis =

Rectogenis (r. 657 – ?) was a medieval Galician clergyman.

Catholic Church titles
| Preceded by Hermenfred | Bishop of Lugo; 657–? | Succeeded by Euphrasius |
