= Paul F. Grendler =

American historian (born 1936)

- Born: May 24, 1936 (age 90); Armstrong, Iowa, United States
- Occupations: historian, author
- Scientific career
- Fields: History of the papacy
- Workplaces: University of Toronto

Paul F. Grendler (born 24 May 1936) is an American historian of the Italian Renaissance.

== Biography ==
He was born on May 24, 1936, in Armstrong, Iowa.

His grandparents were Polish American immigrants.

== Education ==
He studied at Loras College in Dubuque, Iowa. He also attended the Oberlin Conservatory of Music, and Oberlin College.

He received a BA degree with a major in history from Oberlin College in 1959 and his MA degree in sixteenth-century French history in 1962 from the University of Wisconsin.

== Career ==
He worked as a lecturer of history at the University of Pittsburgh from 1963 to 1964.

He is currently a professor emeritus in the History Department at the University of Toronto.

== Awards and honours ==
He has received the Dartmouth Medal of the American Library Association.

He has received the Roland H. Bainton Prize.

He received the Paul Oskar Kristeller Lifetime Achievement Award in 2017.

In 2014 he received the Premio Internazionale Galileo Galilei.

== Bibliography ==
He is the author of a number of notable books:

- The Humanities in Jesuit Schools 1548–1773
- The Expulsion and Return of the Jesuits to Venice, 1606-57: A Test of Loyalty between the Papacy and the Jesuits
- Policy Dialogue: The Rise and Decline of Catholic Education, 1500-Present
- The Roman Inquisition and the Venetian Press
- The Jesuits and Italian Universities, 1548-1773
- Schooling in Renaissance Italy: Literacy and Learning, 1300-1600

== See also ==
- Italian Renaissance
- Biblioteca Marciana
