= Euphrasius (African bishop) =

5th century bishop

Saint Euphrasius, also known as Euphrasius of Africa, was a 5th-century bishop living in Roman Africa, who was martyred by a group of Vandals who practiced the Arianism in the 430s. His feast day is 14 January. He was formerly in the Roman Martyrology but has been removed. His relics were brought to Corsica for safekeeping and the first cathedral of Ajaccio was dedicated to him and Saint John.

It is noted that it is possible that Euphrasius may be the same person as Eucrathius, a correspondent of Cyprian of Carthage.
