= Euphrasius (bishop of Lugo) =

Euphrasius of Lugo (681–688) was a medieval Galician clergyman.

Catholic Church titles
Preceded by Rectogenis	Bishop of Lugo; 681–688	Succeeded by Potencius
