= Odoarius =

Medieval Galician clergyman

Odoarius (bishop 750–780) was a medieval Galician clergyman. He was of Andalusi or North-African origini and headed north after hearing of the victories of Pelagius against the Muslims and the ascent of Alfonso I of Asturias to the throne. He is supposed to have restored the see of Lugo after the reconquest of Galicia from the Moors by king Alfonso I of Asturias.

== Bibliography ==
- Consello da Cultura Galega (ed.), Documentos da Catedral de Lugo, (Santiago de Compostela, 1998)

Catholic Church titles
Preceded by Potencius	Bishop of Lugo; 750–780	Succeeded by Adulfus
