= Reccared (bishop of Lugo) =

Reccared or Recaredus (885–923) was a medieval Galician clergyman.

Catholic Church titles
Preceded by Flaianus	Bishop of Lugo; 885–923	Succeeded by Erus
