= Council of Orange (441) =

The First Council of Orange (or First Synod of Orange) was held in the diocese of Orange, then part of the Western Roman Empire, in 441. The meeting took place in a church called the ecclesia Justinianensis, under the presidency of Bishop Hilary of Arles. Seventeen bishops attended the meeting, among them Bishop Eucherius of Lyons.

The signing of the Canons, which marked the culmination of the synod, took place on 8 November 441.

== Bishops in attendance ==
- Hilarius
- Claudius
- Constantinus
- Audentius
- Agrestius
- Julius
- Auspicius
- Theodorus
- Maximus
- Eucherius
- Nectarius
- Ingenuus
- Ceretius
- Justus
- Augustalis
- Salonius
- Superventor for Claudius

== Enactments ==
Thirty canons (or 'regulations') were agreed upon and subscribed to, dealing with extreme unction, the Permission of penance, the right of sanctuary; recommending caution to bishops in the ordination of foreign clergy, the consecration of churches outside of their own jurisdictions; imposing limitations on the administration of ecclesiastical rites to those who were in any way defective, either in body or mind; and emphasizing the duty of celibacy for those belonging to the clerical state, especially deacons and widows, with specific reference to canon viii. of the Synod of Turin (AD 401).

The exact interpretation of some of the canons (ii., iii., xvii.) is debated. Canon iv. is alleged to be in conflict with a decretal of Pope Siricius; and ii. and xviii. betray an inclination to resist the introduction of Roman customs. Canon XVI determines that a person who has been possessed by a demon cannot be ordained, and if they have been ordained, they must be deposed. Canon XXVI requires that married men must not be ordained deacons until they have sworn chastity. Canon XXVII requires that if an ordained deacon should have sex with his wife, then he should be deposed. These canons were confirmed at the Synods of Arles about 443.

The canons of the first council are often cited in the modern debates over the ordination of women to the priesthood.

== Sources ==
- Karl Joseph von Hefele (1883). A History of the Councils of the Church: A.D. 431 to A.D. 451, tr. from the German, with the author's approbation. Vol. III: A.D. 431 to A.D. 451. Edinburgh: T. & T. Clark. pp. 159–164.
- Karl Josef von Hefele, Consiliengeschichte, ii. 291–295, 724 sqq., Eng. transl., iii. 159–184, iv. 152 sqq.
- Jacques Sirmond (1789). Conciliorum Galliae tam editorum quam ineditorum collectio, temporum ordine digesta... Opera et studio monachorum congregationis Sancti Mauri (in Latin). Vol. Tomus I. Paris: sumptibus P. Didot. pp. 449–464.
- J. Sirmond, Concilia antiqua Gallia, i. 70 sqq., 215 sqq., Paris, 1829.
