= Ursula von Münsterberg =

German nun and writer

Ursula von Münsterberg (German: Ursula von Münsterberg; Czech: Uršula z Minstrberka, Voršila Minstrberská, kněžna a Kladská hraběnka; c. 1491/95 or 1499, presumably in Teschen - after 2 February 1534, presumably in Stift Gernrode or Liegnitz) was a German nun and writer, known for her role during the reformation.

== Life ==
She was a daughter of Victor, Duke of Münsterberg, and a granddaughter of George of Poděbrady, king of Bohemia. She came from the Crownlands of the Bohemian Kingdom, which is now the Czech Republic.

She became a nun in the Order of St Mary Magdalene. She famously left the convent during the reformation. She became a known Protestant writer.
