= Silvestro de Buoni =

Italian painter

Silvestro de Buoni (died 1484) was an Italian painter of the early-Renaissance period, specifically the Quattrocento in Naples. Also called Silvestro de Buono, son of Buono de' Buoni. He was the pupil of the painter Lo Zingaro and Donzelli. He is sometimes confused with Silvestro Morvillo. He painted an Assumption of the Virgin for San Pietro Martire of Naples.
