= San Pietro Martire =

San Pietro Martire may refer to:

- St. Peter of Verona, an Italian saint
- San Pietro Martire (Naples), a church in Naples
- San Pietro Martire (Murano), a church in Murano
