= Morvillo =

Morvillo is an Italian surname. Notable people with the surname include:

- Francesca Morvillo (1945–1992), Italian magistrate and murder victim
- Silvestro Morvillo (1525–1597), Italian painter
