= Delivery of the Franciscan Rule =

1445 painting by Niccolò Antonio Colantonio

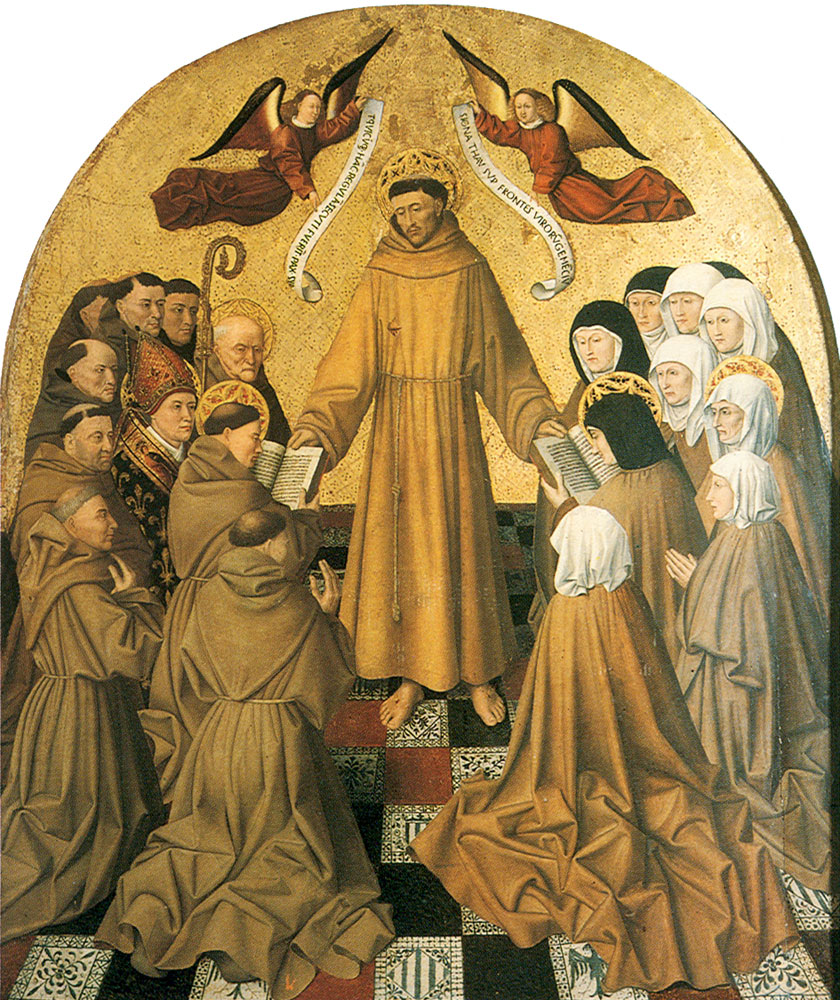
- Artist: Colantonio
- Year: 1445
- Type: Mixed technique on panel
- Dimensions: 150 cm × 185 cm (59 in × 73 in)
- Location: Capodimonte Museum, Naples

Delivery of the Franciscan Rule is a painting by the Italian early Renaissance artist Niccolò Antonio Colantonio, dating from 1445 and housed in the Capodimonte Museum of Naples.

== History ==
Colantonio operated in Naples from around 1440 to 1460, under king René of Anjou (1438–1442), an admirer of Flemish, Burgundian and Provençal art, and under Alfonso V of Aragon, who was connected to Aragon, where art was in turn inspired by Flemish models.

The diversity of these two influences is visible in the two panels executed by Colantonio for the Franciscan church of San Lorenzo Maggiore, which were painted in two different moments and were later completed by Antonello da Messina with smaller side panels of blessed Franciscans. The general theme of the altarpiece was the celebration of the Franciscan thought, of which St. Jerome, according to the theories of St. Bernardino of Siena, had been one of the main influences.

== Description ==
The scene depicts, above a gilt background, a slender St. Francis of Assisi who, in the center, consigns the Franciscan Rule to his brothers, who are kneeling around him. The men at the left, with Fra Leone receiving the book, and the women at the right, including St. Claire. At the top are two symmetrical flying birds, which hold two cartouches.

The work shows that Colantonio, at the time of its realization, was already acquainted with the novelties brought from Aragon at Alfonso's court. This is visible in details such as the steep, nearly vertical pavement, the characters' features, the holed aureolas, and the rigid and geometrical folds of the clothes. The other panel, depicting St. Jerome in His Study, despite being one or two years earlier, is still more influenced by the early Netherlandish painting in favour at the Angevine court, with painters such as Barthélemy d'Eyck.

== Sources ==
- De Vecchi, Pierluigi; Elda Cerchiari (1999). I tempi dell'arte, volume 2. Milan: Bompiani. ISBN 88-451-7212-0.
