= Jerome =

Priest and theologian (c. 342/347 – 420)

Saint Jerome
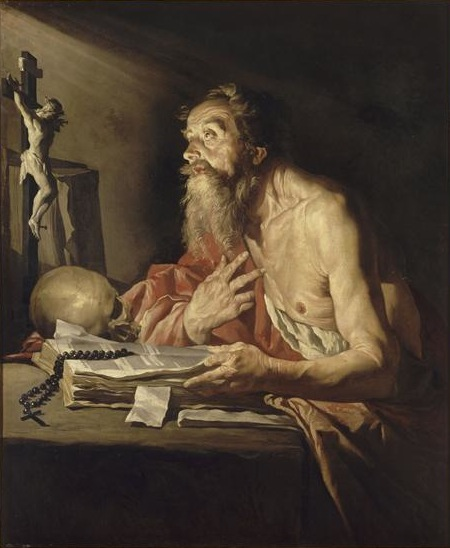
- Saint Jerome by Matthias Stom, 1635

Doctor of the Church
- Born: c. 342–347; Stridon (possibly Strido Dalmatiae, on the border of Dalmatia and Pannonia)
- Died: 30 September 420 (aged approximately 75–78); Bethlehem, Palaestina Prima
- Venerated in: Catholic Church; Eastern Orthodox Church; Oriental Orthodox Church; Anglican Communion; Lutheranism
- Major shrine: Basilica of Saint Mary Major, Rome, Italy
- Feast: 30 September (Catholic Church); 15 June (Eastern Orthodox Church)
- Attributes: Lion, cardinal attire, cross, skull, trumpet, owl, books and writing material
- Patronage: Archaeologists; archivists; Bible scholars; librarians; libraries; school children; students; translators; Morong, Rizal; Dalmatia, against anger; Taos Pueblo
- Influences: Paula of Rome, Plato, Aristotle, Vergil, Cicero, Isocrates, Philo, Seneca the younger, Eusebius, Paul the Apostle, Ezra the scribe, Onkelos, Aquila of Sinope, Origen, Sallust, Demosthenes, Xenophon, Josephus, Varro, Cato the elder, Gregory of Nazianzus, Horace
- Theology career
- Education: Catechetical School of Alexandria
- Occupations: Translator, theologian
- Notable work: Vulgate; De viris illustribus Chronicon
- Theological work
- Era: Patristic Age
- Language: Latin, Koine Greek, Hebrew, Aramaic, Illyrian
- Tradition or movement: Trinitarianism
- Main interests: Apologetics, Alchemy, Theology, Christian mysticism
- Notable ideas: Perpetual virginity of Mary

Jerome of Stridon (/dʒəˈroʊm/; Latin: Eusebius Sophronius Hieronymus; Ancient Greek: Εὐσέβιος Σωφρόνιος Ἱερώνυμος; c. 342–347 – 30 September 420), also known as Hieronymus, was an early Christian priest, confessor, theologian, translator, and historian; he is commonly known as Saint Jerome.

He is best known for his translation of the Bible into Latin (the translation that became known as the Vulgate), which was commissioned by Pope Damasus I, and his commentaries on the whole Bible. Jerome attempted to create a translation of the Old Testament based on a Hebrew version, rather than the Septuagint, as prior Latin Bible translations had done. His list of writings is extensive. In addition to his biblical works, he wrote polemical and historical essays, always from a theologian's perspective.

Jerome was known for his teachings on Christian moral life, especially those in cosmopolitan centers such as Rome. He often focused on women's lives and identified how a woman devoted to Jesus should live her life. This focus stemmed from his close patron relationships with several prominent female ascetics who were members of affluent senatorial families.

Jerome is recognized as a saint and, along with Ambrose, Augustine of Hippo and Pope Gregory the Great, as one of the four Great Latin Church Fathers by the Catholic Church. He is also recognized as a saint in the Eastern Orthodox Church, (Note: In the Eastern Orthodox Church he is known as Saint Jerome of Stridonium or Blessed Jerome. "Blessed" in this context does not have the sense of being less than a saint, as it does in the West.) the Lutheran Church, and the Anglican Communion. His feast day is 30 September (Gregorian calendar).

== Early life ==
Eusebius Sophronius Hieronymus was born at Stridon around 342–347 AD. He was of Illyrian ancestry. He was not baptized until about 360–369 in Rome, where he had gone with his friend Bonosus of Sardica to pursue rhetorical and philosophical studies. (This Bonosus may or may not have been the same Bonosus whom Jerome identifies as his friend who went to live as a hermit on an island in the Adriatic.) Jerome studied under the philologist Aelius Donatus. There he learned Latin and at least some Koine Greek, though he probably did not yet acquire the familiarity with Greek literature that he later claimed to have acquired as a schoolboy.

As a student, Jerome engaged in the superficial escapades and sexual experimentation of students in Rome; he indulged himself quite casually but he suffered terrible bouts of guilt afterwards. To appease his conscience, on Sundays he visited the sepulchers of the martyrs and the Apostles in the catacombs. This experience reminded him of the terrors of Hell:

Often I would find myself entering those crypts, deep dug in the earth, with their walls on either side lined with the bodies of the dead, where everything was so dark that almost it seemed as though the Psalmist's words were fulfilled, Let them go down quick into Hell. Here and there the light, not entering in through windows, but filtering down from above through shafts, relieved the horror of the darkness. But again, as soon as you found yourself cautiously moving forward, the black night closed around, and there came to my mind the line of Virgil, "Horror ubique animos, simul ipsa silentia terrent". (Note: Patrologia Latina 25, 373: Crebroque cryptas ingredi, quae in terrarum profunda defossae, ex utraque parte ingredientium per parietes habent corpora sepultorum, et ita obscura sunt omnia, ut propemodum illud propheticum compleatur: Descendant ad infernum viventes (Ps. LIV,16): et raro desuper lumen admissum, horrorem temperet tenebrarum, ut non-tam fenestram, quam foramen demissi luminis putes: rursumque pedetentim acceditur, et caeca nocte circumdatis illud Virgilianum proponitur (Aeneid. lib. II): "Horror ubique animos, simul ipsa silentia terrent.")

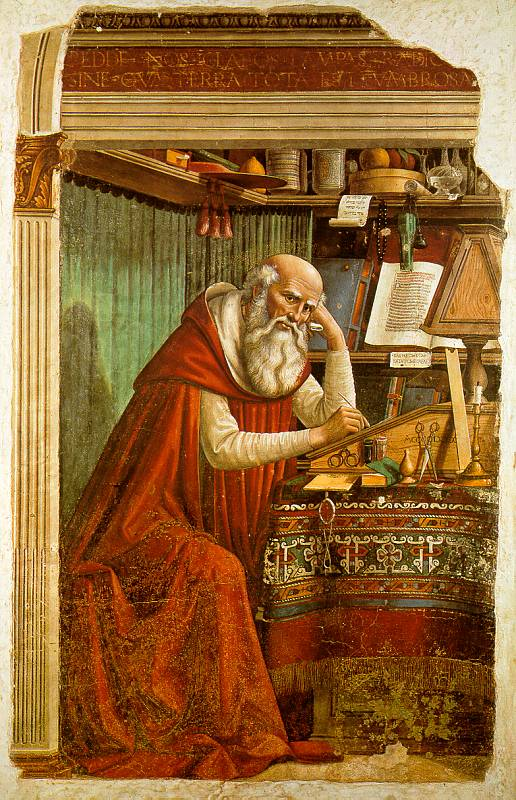
St. Jerome in His Study (1480), by Domenico Ghirlandaio

The quotation from Virgil reads, in translation, "On all sides round, horror spread wide; the very silence breathed a terror on my soul."

=== Conversion to Christianity ===
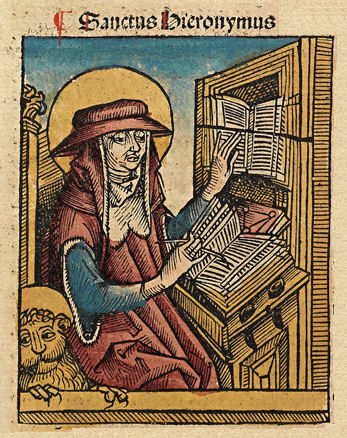
St Jerome in the Nuremberg Chronicle (1493)

Although at first afraid of Christianity, he eventually converted.

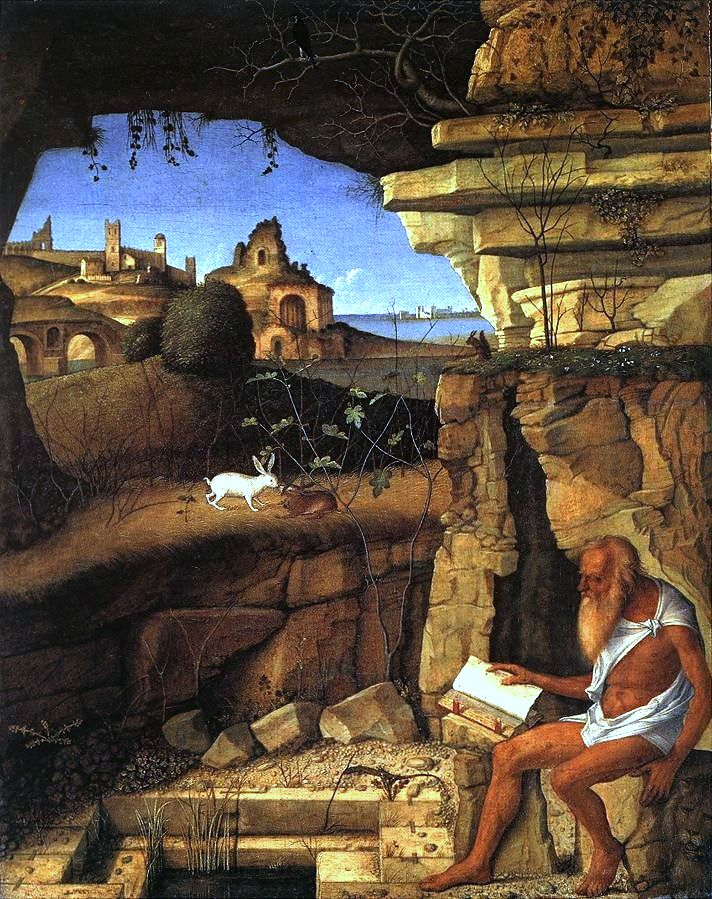
St. Jerome in the Desert, by Giovanni Bellini (1505)

Seized with a desire for a life of ascetic penance, Jerome went for a time to the desert of Chalcis, to the southeast of Antioch, known as the "Syrian Thebaid" from the number of eremites (hermits) inhabiting it. During this period, he seems to have found time for studying and writing. He made his first attempt to learn Hebrew under the guidance of a converted Jew; and he seems to have been in correspondence with Jewish Christians in Antioch. Around this time, he had copied for himself a Hebrew Gospel, of which fragments are preserved in his notes. It is known today as the Gospel of the Hebrews, which the Nazarenes considered to be the true Gospel of Matthew. Jerome translated parts of this Hebrew Gospel into Greek.

=== Ministry in Rome ===
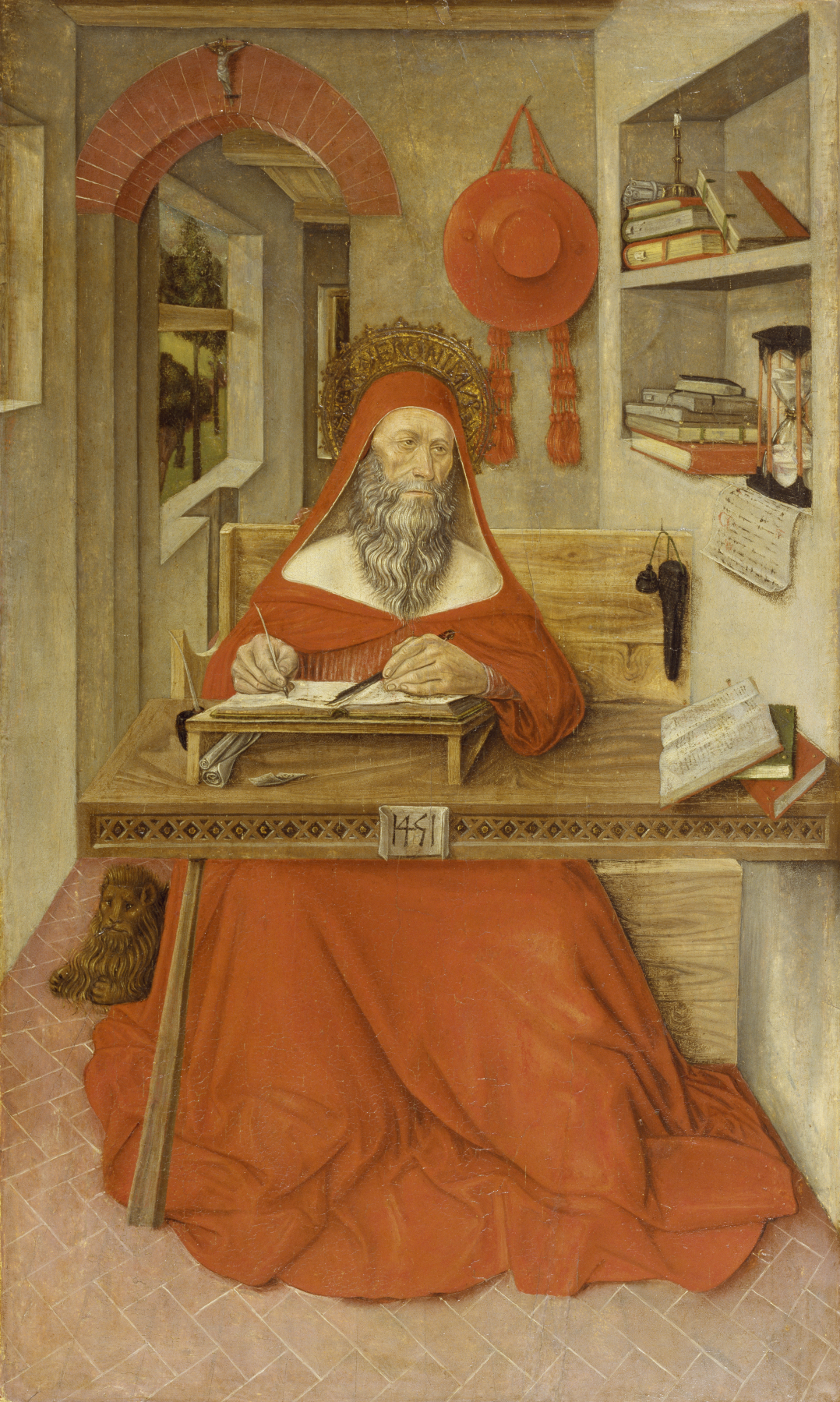
Saint Jerome in His Study, 1451, by Antonio da Fabriano II, shows writing implements, scrolls, and manuscripts testifying to Jerome's scholarly pursuits. The Walters Art Museum.

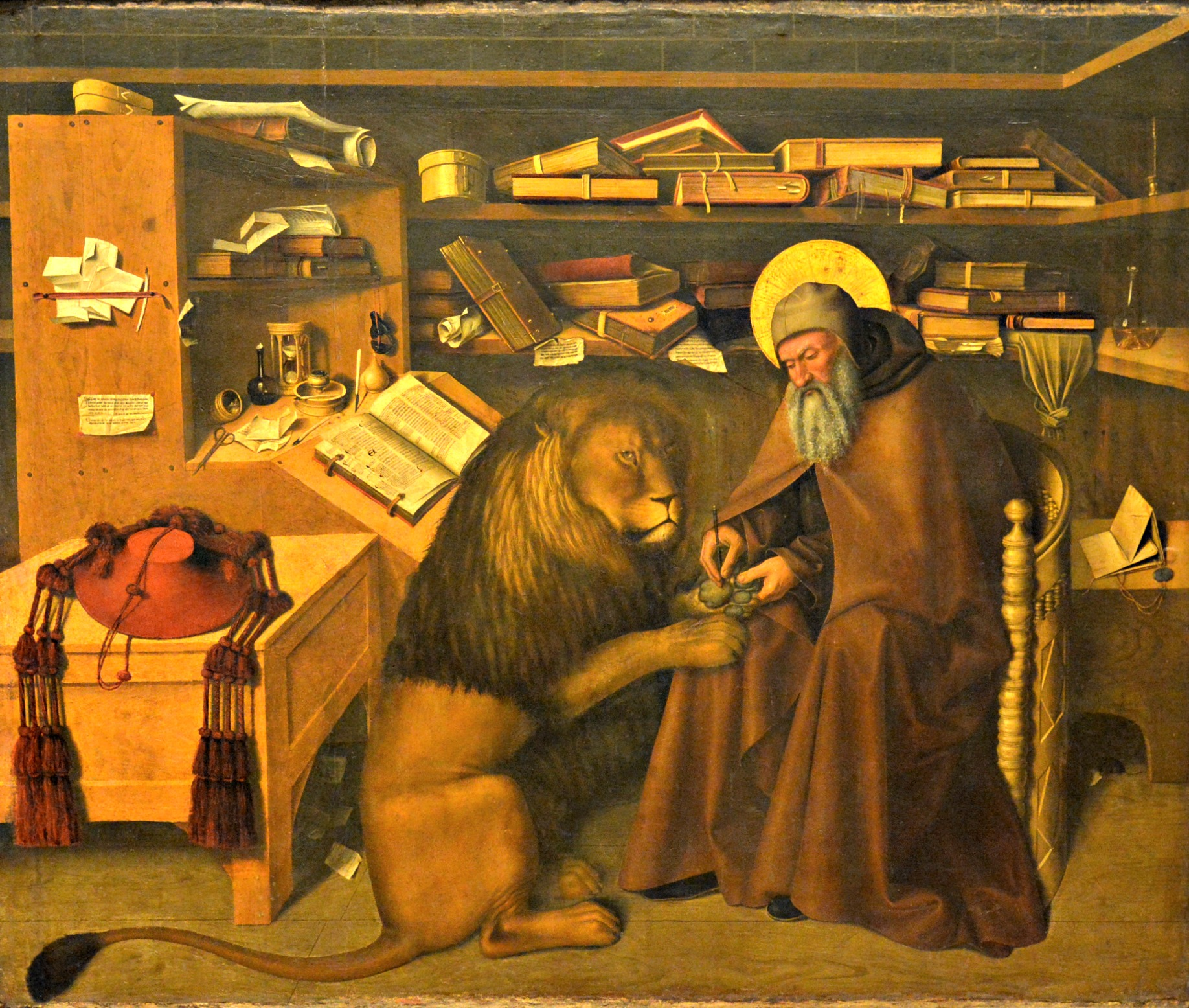
Saint Jerome in His Study, by Niccolò Antonio Colantonio c. 1445–46, depicts Jerome's removal of a thorn from a lion's paw.

As protégé of Pope Damasus I, Jerome was given duties in Rome, and he undertook a revision of the Vetus Latina Gospels based on Greek manuscripts. He also updated the Psalter containing the Book of Psalms then in use in Rome, based on the Septuagint.

Throughout his epistles, he shows himself to be surrounded by women and united with close ties; it is estimated that 40% of his epistles were addressed to someone of the female sex and, at the time, he was criticized for it.

Even in his time, Jerome noted Porphyry's accusation that the Christian communities were run by women and that the favor of the ladies decided who could accede to the dignity of the priesthood.

In Rome, Jerome was surrounded by a circle of well-born and well-educated women, including some from the noblest patrician families. Among these women were such as the widows Lea, Marcella, and Paula, and Paula's daughters Blaesilla and Eustochium. The resulting inclination of these women towards the monastic life, away from the indulgent lasciviousness in Rome, and his unsparing criticism of the secular clergy of Rome, brought a growing hostility against him among the Roman clergy and their supporters. Soon after the death of his patron Pope Damasus I on 10 December 384, Jerome was forced to leave his position at Rome after an inquiry was brought up by the Roman clergy into allegations that he had an improper relationship with the widow Paula. Still, his writings were highly regarded by women who were attempting to maintain vows of becoming consecrated virgins. His letters were widely read and distributed throughout the Christian empire, and it is clear through his writing that he knew these virgin women were not his only audience.

Additionally, Jerome's condemnation of Blaesilla's hedonistic lifestyle in Rome led her to adopt ascetic practices, but these affected her health and worsened her physical weakness to the point that she died just four months after starting to follow his instructions; much of the Roman populace was outraged that Jerome, in their view, thus caused the premature death of such a lively young woman. Additionally, his insistence to Paula that Blaesilla should not be mourned and complaints that her grief was excessive were seen as heartless, which further polarized Roman opinion against him.

== Scholarly works ==
=== Translation of the Bible (382–405) ===
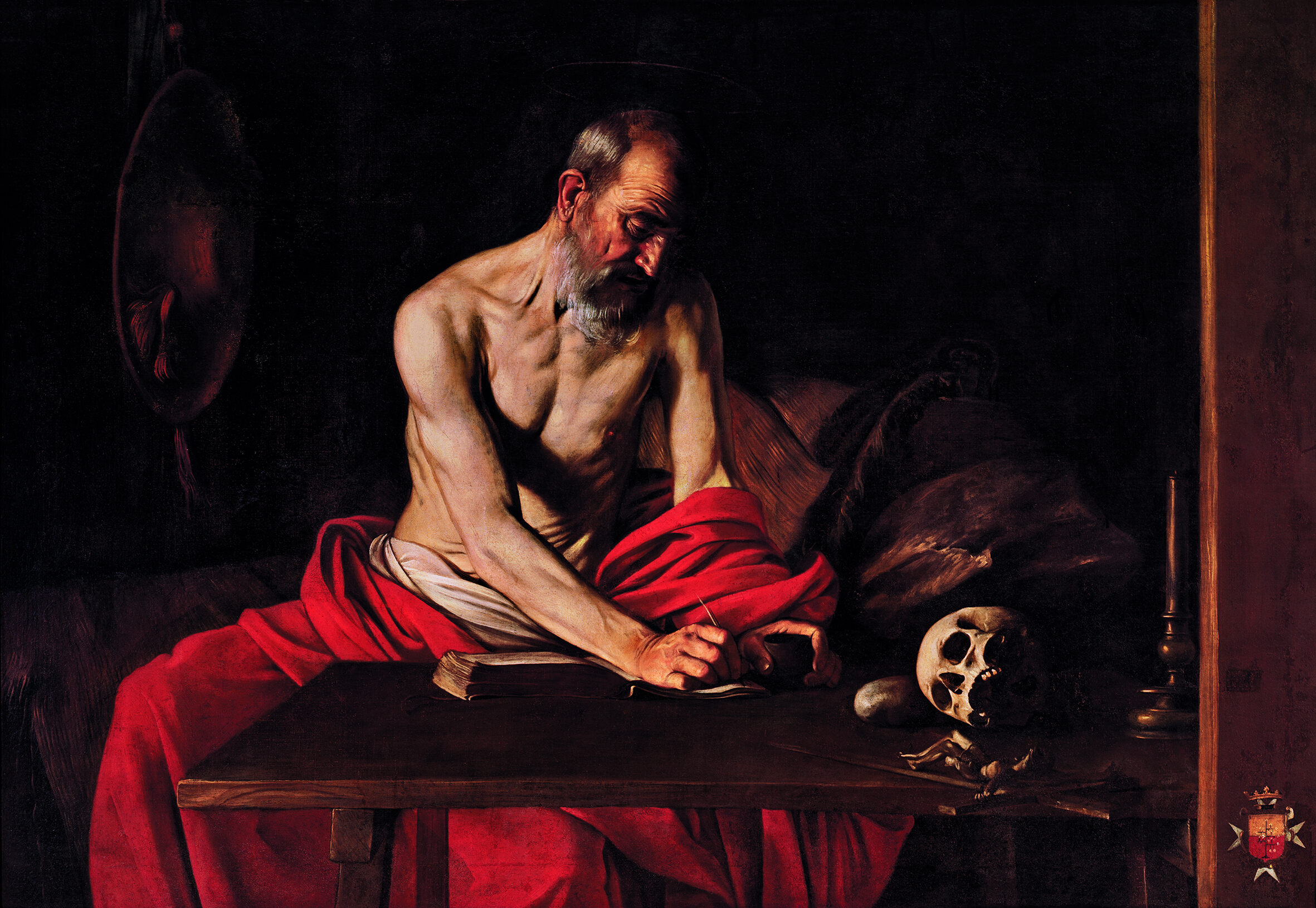
Saint Jerome Writing, by Caravaggio, 1607, at St John's Co-Cathedral, Valletta, Malta

Jerome was a scholar at a time when being a scholar implied a fluency in Greek. He knew some Hebrew when he started his translation project, but moved to Jerusalem to strengthen his grip on Jewish scripture commentary. A wealthy Roman aristocrat, Paula, funded Jerome's stay in a monastery in the nearby city of Bethlehem, where he settled next to the Church of the Nativity – built half a century prior on orders of Emperor Constantine over what was reputed to be the site of the Nativity of Jesus – and he completed his translation there.

He began in 382 by correcting the existing Latin-language version of the New Testament, commonly referred to as the Vetus Latina. By 390 he turned to translating the Hebrew Bible from the original Hebrew, having previously translated portions from the Septuagint which came from Alexandria. He believed that the mainstream Rabbinical Judaism had rejected the Septuagint as invalid Jewish scriptural texts because of what were ascertained as mistranslations along with its Hellenistic heretical elements. (Note: "(...) die griechische Bibelübersetzung, die einem innerjüdischen Bedürfnis entsprang (...) [von den] Rabbinen zuerst gerühmt (...) Später jedoch, als manche ungenaue Übertragung des hebräischen Textes in der Septuaginta und Übersetzungsfehler die Grundlage für hellenistische Irrlehren abgaben, lehte man die Septuaginta ab." (Homolka 1999, pp. 43–)) He completed this work by 405.

Prior to Jerome's Vulgate, all Latin translations of the Old Testament were based on the Septuagint, not the Hebrew. Jerome's decision to use a Hebrew text instead of the previously translated Septuagint went against the advice of most other Christians, including Augustine, who thought the Septuagint inspired. Some modern scholars believe that the Greek Hexapla is the main source for Jerome's "iuxta Hebraeos" (i.e. "close to the Hebrews", "according to the Hebrews") translation of the Old Testament. Although some scholarship has cast doubts on the actual quality of Jerome's Hebrew knowledge, detailed studies have shown that to a considerable degree Jerome was a competent Hebraist.

=== De Viris Illustribus ===
Between 392 and 393 Jerome produced a biobibliography covering four centuries of primarily Christian writers from the apostolic age up until Jerome himself. The text was modeled after earlier Greek and Latin authors. De Viris Illustribus (On Illustrious Men) circulated widely soon after its completion, becoming an influential Christian biographical collection and defining a canon of knowledge.

It was written as an apologetic work to demonstrate the accomplishments of prominent Christian authors, including Jerome himself, at a time when Christian writing was seen as inferior.

=== Biblical onomastica ===
Jerome also produced two onomastica which were commonly found in subsequent Bibles until the Reformation:

- Liber de Nominibus Hebraicis, a list of names of people in the Bible and etymologies, based on a work attributed to Philo and expanded by Origen;
- A translation and expansion of the Onomasticon of Eusebius, listing and commenting on places mentioned in the Bible.

=== Commentaries (405–420) ===
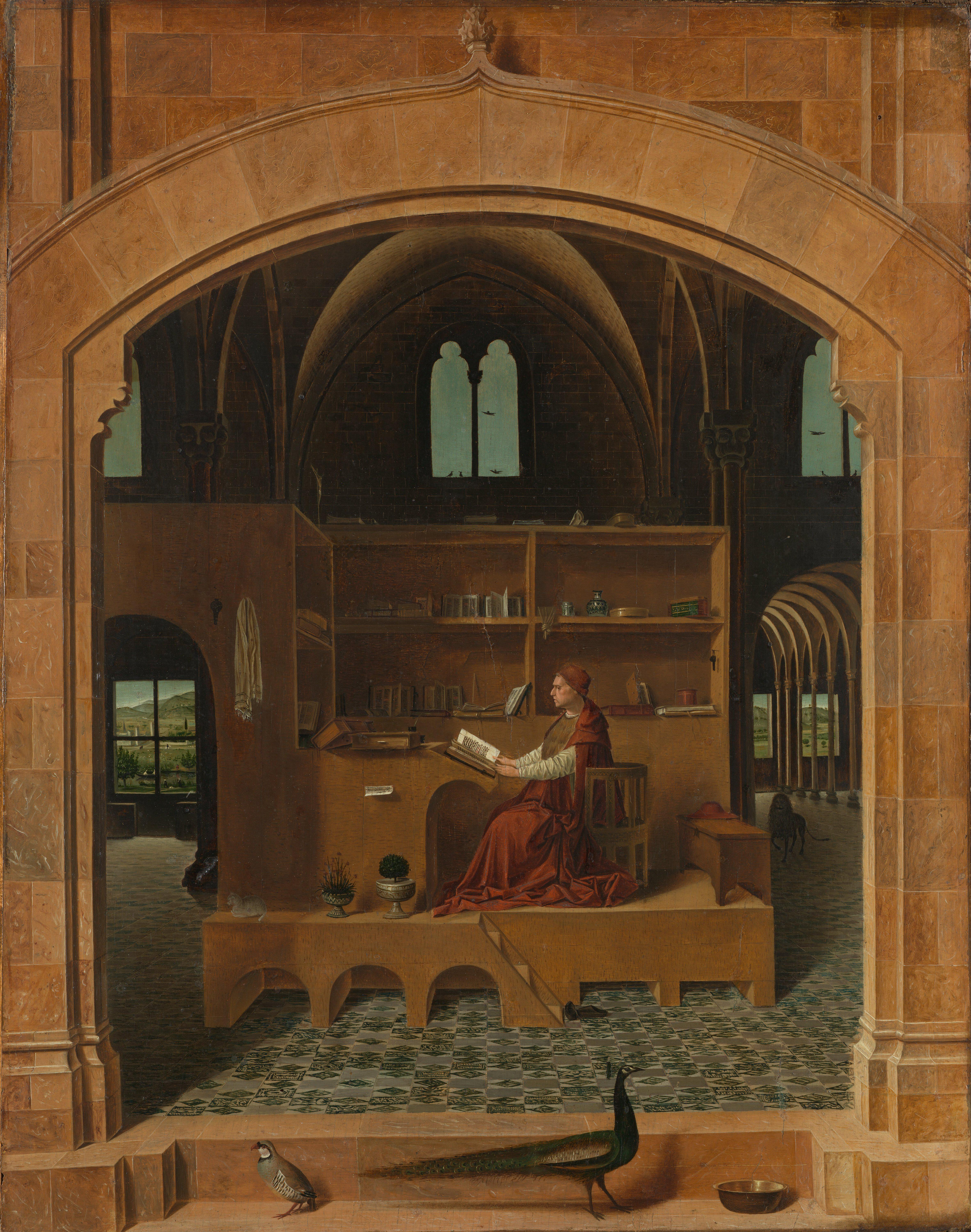
Saint Jerome in His Study by Antonello da Messina, c. 1474

For the next 15 years, until he died, Jerome produced a number of commentaries on Scripture, often explaining his translation choices in using the original Hebrew rather than suspect translations. His patristic commentaries align closely with Jewish tradition, and he indulges in allegorical and mystical subtleties after the manner of Philo and the Alexandrian school. Unlike his contemporaries, he emphasizes the difference between the Hebrew Bible "Apocrypha" and the Hebraica veritas of the protocanonical books. In his Vulgate's prologues, he describes some portions of books in the Septuagint that were not found in the Hebrew as being non-canonical (he called them apocrypha); for Baruch, he mentions by name in his Prologue to Jeremiah and notes that it is neither read nor held among the Hebrews, but does not explicitly call it apocryphal or "not in the canon". His Preface to the Books of Samuel and Kings (commonly called the Helmeted Preface) includes the following statement:

This preface to the Scriptures may serve as a "helmeted" introduction to all the books which we turn from Hebrew into Latin, so that we may be assured that what is not found in our list must be placed amongst the Apocryphal writings. Wisdom, therefore, which generally bears the name of Solomon, and the book of Jesus, the Son of Sirach, and Judith, and Tobias, and the Shepherd are not in the canon. The first book of Maccabees I have found to be Hebrew, the second is Greek, as can be proved from the very style.

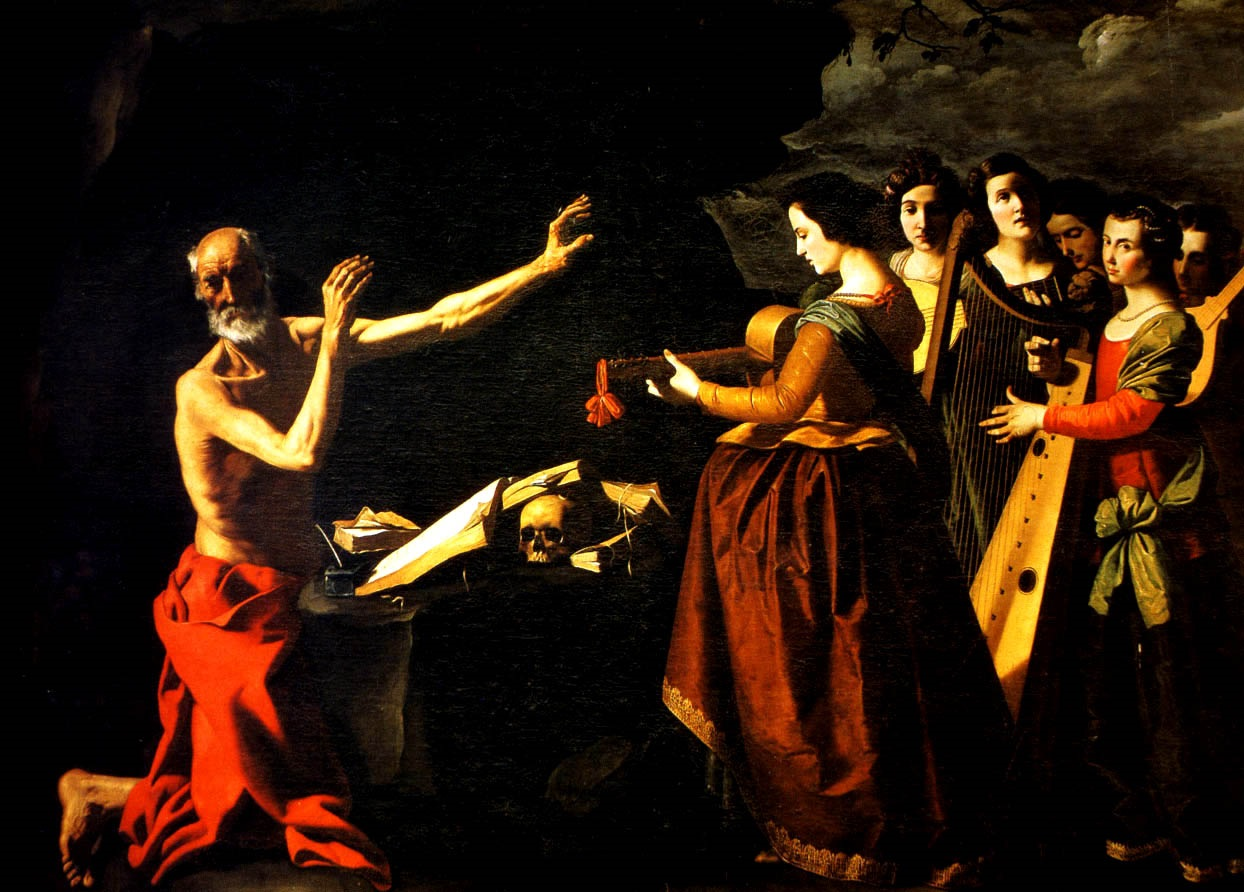
Jerome in the desert, tormented by his memories of the dancing girls, by Francisco de Zurbarán, 1639, Monastery of Santa María de Guadalupe

=== Historical and hagiographic writings ===
Jerome as a historian

Jerome's most famous work of historical writing was the Chronicon, a translation, reworking, and continuation of the Chronicon of Eusebius. Written in Constantinople around 380, it became an influential text in Latin Christendom even though it is not without errors. In his other works he evoked historical events and used history as an example and source of argument. Even though Jerome engaged in historical writing, he did not consider himself bound by the rules of historians and his output in this domain has to be judged accordingly.

==== Description of vitamin A deficiency ====
The following passage, taken from Jerome’s hagiography, appears to be the earliest account of the etiology, symptoms and cure of severe vitamin A deficiency:

From his thirty-first to his thirty-fifth year he had for food six ounces of barley bread, and vegetables slightly cooked without oil. But finding that his eyes were growing dim, and that his whole body was shrivelled with an eruption and a sort of stony roughness (impetigine et pumicea quad scabredine) he added oil to his former food, and up to the sixty-third year of his life followed this temperate course, tasting neither fruit nor pulse, nor anything whatsoever besides.

=== Letters ===
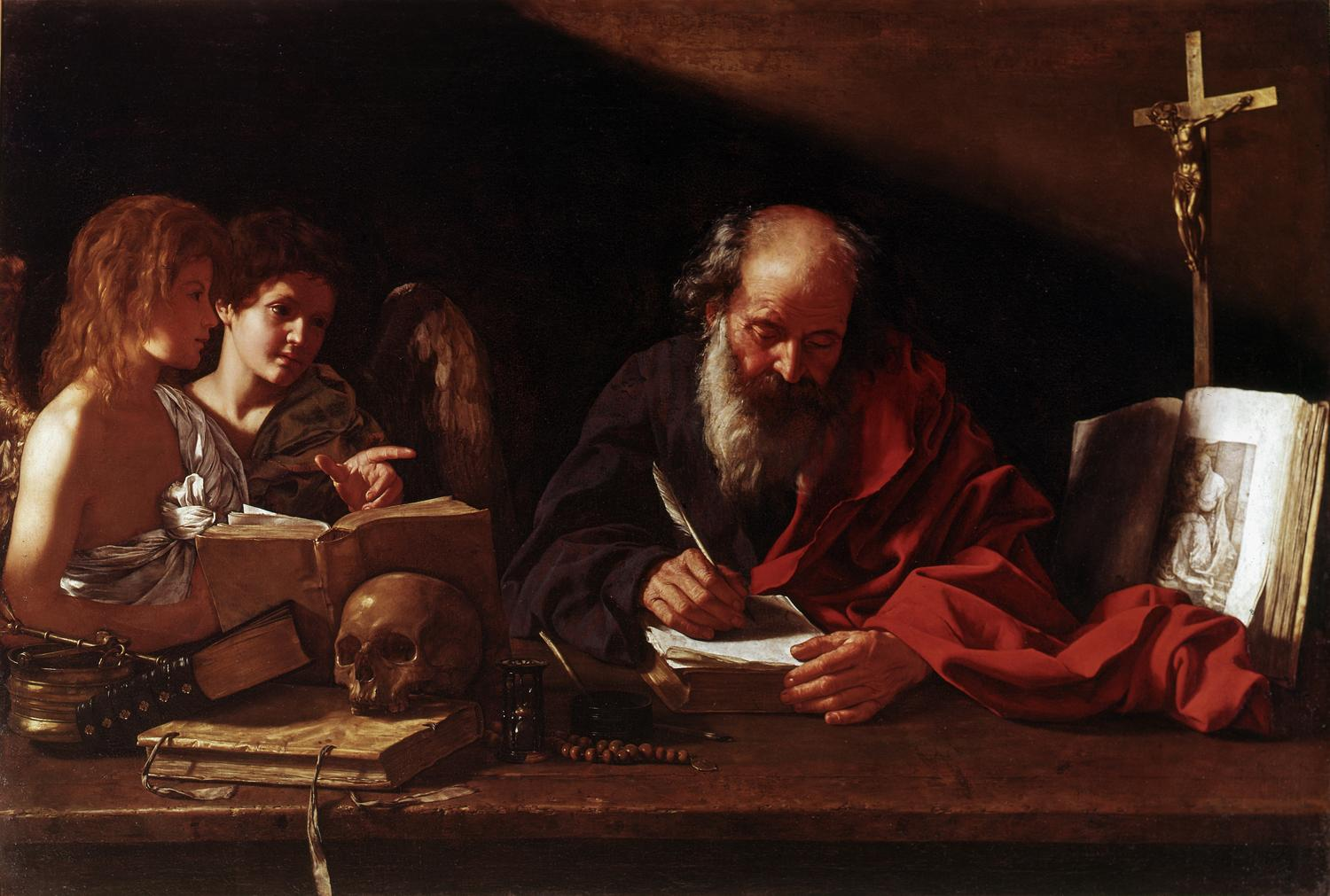
Saint Jerome depicted in his study being visited by two angels (Cavarozzi, early-17th century)

Jerome's letters or epistles, both by the great variety of their subjects and by their qualities of style, form an important portion of his literary remains. Whether he is discussing problems of scholarship, or reasoning on cases of conscience, comforting the afflicted, or saying pleasant things to his friends, scourging the vices and corruptions of the time and against sexual immorality among the clergy, exhorting to the ascetic life and renunciation of the world, or debating his theological opponents, he gives a vivid picture not only of his own mind, but of the age and its peculiar characteristics. (See Plowboy trope.) Because there was no distinct line between personal documents and those meant for publication, his letters frequently contain both confidential messages and treatises meant for others besides the one to whom he was writing.

Due to the time he spent in Rome among wealthy families belonging to the Roman upper class, Jerome was frequently commissioned by women who had taken a vow of virginity to write to them in guidance of how to live their life. As a result, he spent a great deal of his life corresponding with these women about certain abstentions and lifestyle practices.

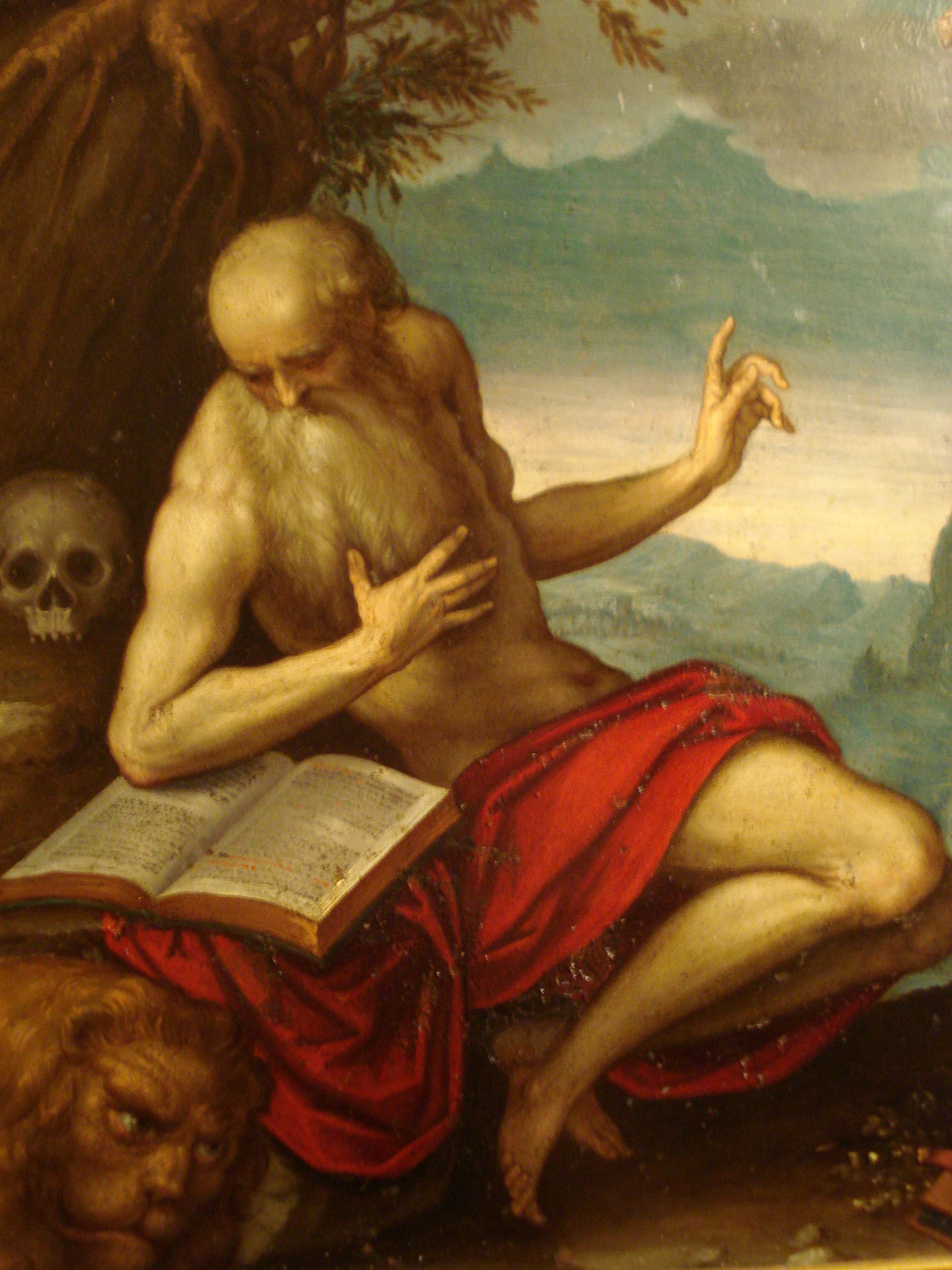
Francesco St Jerome by Jacopo Palma il Giovane, c. 1595

=== Theological writings ===
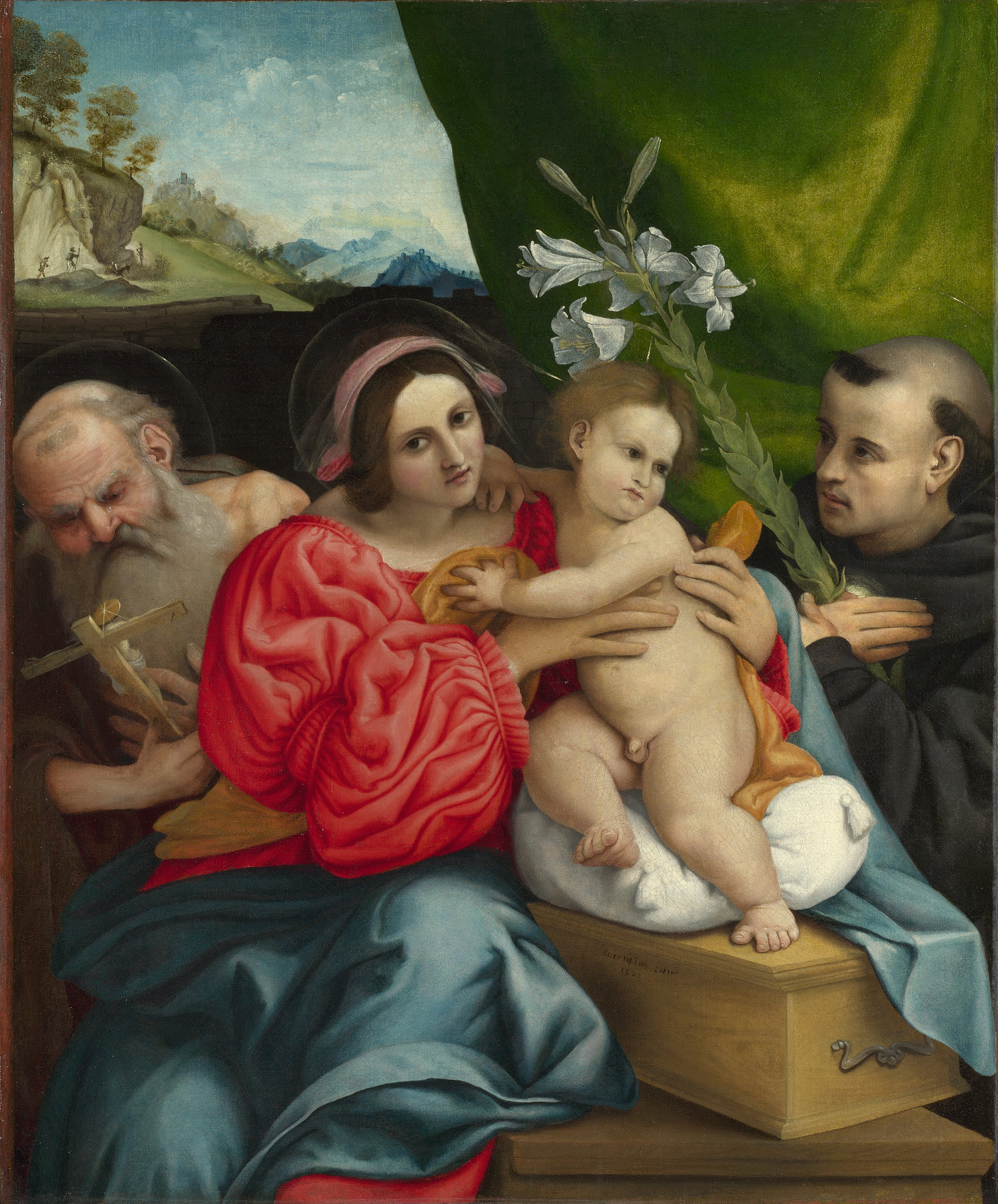
The Virgin and Child with Saints Jerome and Nicholas of Tolentino by Lorenzo Lotto, 1522

==== Eschatology ====
Jerome warned that those substituting fake interpretations for the actual meaning of Scripture belonged to the "synagogue of the Antichrist". "He that is not of Christ is of Antichrist", he wrote to Pope Damasus I. He believed that "the mystery of iniquity" written about by Paul in 2 Thessalonians 2:7 was already in action when "every one chatters about his views." To Jerome, the power restraining this mystery of iniquity was the Roman Empire, but as it fell this restraining force was removed. He warned a noblewoman of Gaul:

He that letteth is taken out of the way, and yet we do not realize that Antichrist is near. Yes, Antichrist is near whom the Lord Jesus Christ "shall consume with the spirit of his mouth". "Woe unto them," he cries, "that are with child, and to them that give suck in those days." ... Savage tribes in countless numbers have overrun all parts of Gaul. The whole country between the Alps and the Pyrenees, between the Rhine and the Ocean, has been laid waste by hordes of Quadi, Vandals, Sarmatians, Alans, Gepids, Herules, Saxons, Burgundians, Allemanni, and – alas! for the commonweal! – even Pannonians.

His Commentary on Daniel was expressly written to offset the criticisms of Porphyry, who taught that Daniel related entirely to the time of Antiochus IV Epiphanes and was written by an unknown individual living in the second century BC. Against Porphyry, Jerome identified Rome as the fourth kingdom of chapters two and seven, but his view of chapters eight and eleven was more complex. Jerome held that chapter eight describes the activity of Antiochus Epiphanes, who is understood as a "type" of a future antichrist; 11:24 onwards applies primarily to a future antichrist but was partially fulfilled by Antiochus. Instead, he advocated that the "little horn" was the Antichrist:

We should therefore concur with the traditional interpretation of all the commentators of the Christian Church, that at the end of the world, when the Roman Empire is to be destroyed, there shall be ten kings who will partition the Roman world amongst themselves. Then an insignificant eleventh king will arise, who will overcome three of the ten kings. ... After they have been slain, the seven other kings also will bow their necks to the victor.

In his Commentary on Daniel, he noted, "Let us not follow the opinion of some commentators and suppose him to be either the Devil or some demon, but rather, one of the human race, in whom Satan will wholly take up his residence in bodily form." Instead of rebuilding the Jewish Temple to reign from, Jerome thought the Antichrist sat in God's Temple inasmuch as he made "himself out to be like God."

Jerome identified the four prophetic kingdoms symbolized in Daniel 2 as the Neo-Babylonian Empire, the Medes and Persians, Macedon, and Rome. Jerome identified the stone cut out without hands as "namely, the Lord and Savior".

Jerome refuted Porphyry's application of the little horn of chapter seven to Antiochus. He expected that at the end of the world, Rome would be destroyed, and partitioned among ten kingdoms before the little horn appeared.

Jerome believed that Cyrus of Persia was the higher of the two horns of the Medo-Persian ram of Daniel 8:3. The he-goat is Greece smiting Persia.

==== Soteriology ====
Jerome opposed the doctrine of Pelagianism, and wrote against it three years before his death. Jerome, despite being opposed to Origen, was influenced by Origenism in his soteriology. Although he taught that the Devil and the unbelieving will be eternally punished (unlike Origen), he believed that the punishment for Christian sinners, who have once believed but sin and fall away, will be temporal in nature. Some scholars such as J. N. D. Kelly have also interpreted Ambrose to have held similar views considering the judgement of Christians.

Although Augustine does not name Jerome personally, the view that all Christians would eventually be reunited to God was criticized by Augustine in his treatise "on faith and works".

=== Reception by later Christianity ===
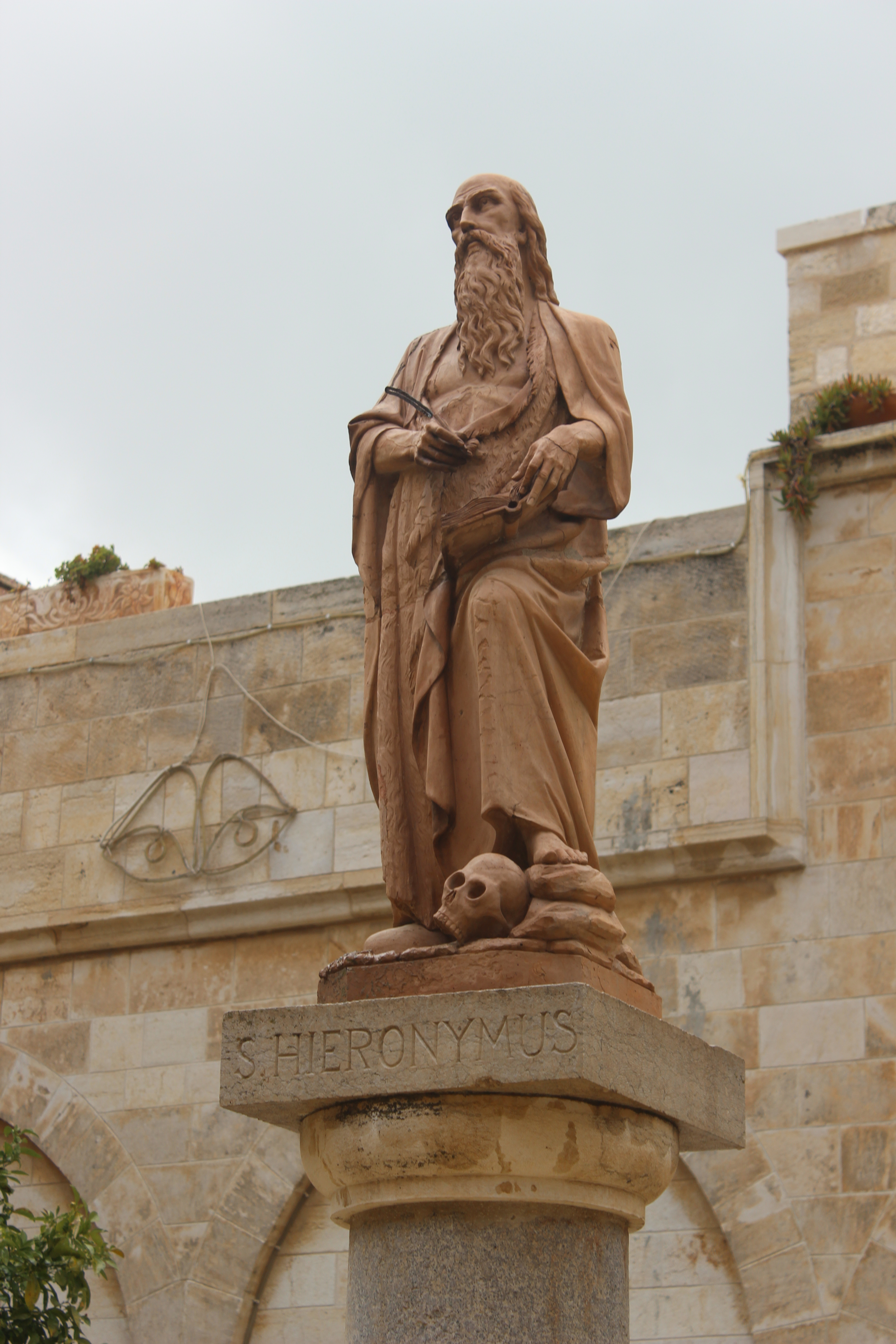
Statue of Saint Jerome, Church of St Catherine, Bethlehem

Jerome is the second-most voluminous writer – after Augustine of Hippo (354–430) – in ancient Latin Christianity. The Catholic Church recognizes him as the patron saint of translators, librarians, and encyclopedists.

Jerome translated many biblical texts into Latin from Hebrew, Aramaic, and Greek. His translations formed part of the Vulgate; the Vulgate eventually superseded the preceding Latin translations of the Bible (the Vetus Latina). The Council of Trent in 1546 declared the Vulgate authoritative "in public lectures, disputations, sermons, and expositions". In the view of Edward Power, his writings show outstanding scholarship and Andrew Louth states that his correspondence has great historical importance.

Jerome showed more zeal and interest in the ascetic ideal than in abstract speculation. He lived as an ascetic for 4~5 years in the Syrian desert, and later near Bethlehem for 34 years. The historian Peter Heather describes him as an "appalling self-publicist" who "jumped on the ascetic bandwagon".

The Church of England honours Jerome with a commemoration on 30 September.

== In art ==
Jerome is also often depicted with a lion, in reference to the popular hagiographical belief that Jerome once tamed a lion in the wilderness by healing its paw. The source for the story may actually have been the second century Roman tale of Androcles, or confusion with the exploits of Gerasimus (Jerome in later Latin is "Geronimus"); (Note: Eugene Rice has suggested that in all probability the story of Gerasimus's lion became attached to the figure of Jerome some time during the seventh century, after the military invasions of the Arabs had forced many Greek monks who were living in the deserts of the Middle East to seek refuge in Rome. Rice 1985, pp. 44–45 conjectures that because of the similarity between the names Gerasimus and Geronimus—the late Latin form of Jerome's name—'a Latin-speaking cleric … made St Geronimus the hero of a story he had heard about St Gerasimus; and that the author of Plerosque nimirum, attracted by a story at once so picturesque, so apparently appropriate, and so resonant in suggestion and meaning, and under the impression that its source was pilgrims who had been told it in Bethlehem, included it in his life of a favourite saint otherwise bereft of miracles.'" (Salter 2001, p. 12)) it is "a figment" found in the thirteenth-century Golden Legend by Jacobus de Voragine. Hagiographies of Jerome talk of his having spent many years in the Syrian desert, and artists often depict him in a "wilderness", which for West European painters can take the form of a wood.

From the late Middle Ages, depictions of Jerome in a wider setting became popular. He is either shown in his study, surrounded by books and the equipment of a scholar, or in a rocky desert, or in a setting that combines both aspects, with him studying a book under the shelter of a rock-face or cave mouth, where he may be raggedly-dressed and has a long white beard. In depictions of him in a scholar's study, by contrast, the study is often shown as large and well-provided for, the saint clean-shaven and well-dressed, and a cardinal's hat may appear. These images derive from the tradition of the evangelist portrait, though Jerome is often given the library and desk of a serious scholar. His attribute of the lion, often shown at a smaller scale, may be beside him in either setting. The subject of "Jerome Penitent" first appears in the later 15th century in Italy; he is usually in the desert, wearing ragged clothes, and often naked above the waist. His gaze is usually fixed on a crucifix and he may beat himself with his fist or a rock. In one of Georges de La Tour's 17th century French versions of St. Jerome his penitence is depicted alongside his red cardinal hat.

Jerome is often depicted in connection with the vanitas motif, the reflection on the meaninglessness of earthly life and the transient nature of all earthly goods and pursuits. In the 16th century Saint Jerome in his study by Pieter Coecke van Aelst and workshop, the saint is depicted with a skull. Behind him on the wall is pinned an admonition, Cogita Mori ("Think upon death"). Further reminders of the vanitas motif of the passage of time and the imminence of death are the image of the Last Judgment visible in the saint's Bible, the candle and the hourglass.

Both Agostino Carracci and Domenichino portrayed Jerome's last communion.

Jerome is also sometimes depicted with an owl, the symbol of wisdom and scholarship. Writing materials and the trumpet of final judgment are also part of his iconography.

A four and three quarters foot tall limestone statue of Jerome was installed above the entrance of O'Shaughnessy Library on the campus of the University of St. Thomas (then College of St. Thomas) in St. Paul Minnesota in October 1950. The sculptor was Joseph Kiselewski and the stone carver was Egisto Bertozzi.

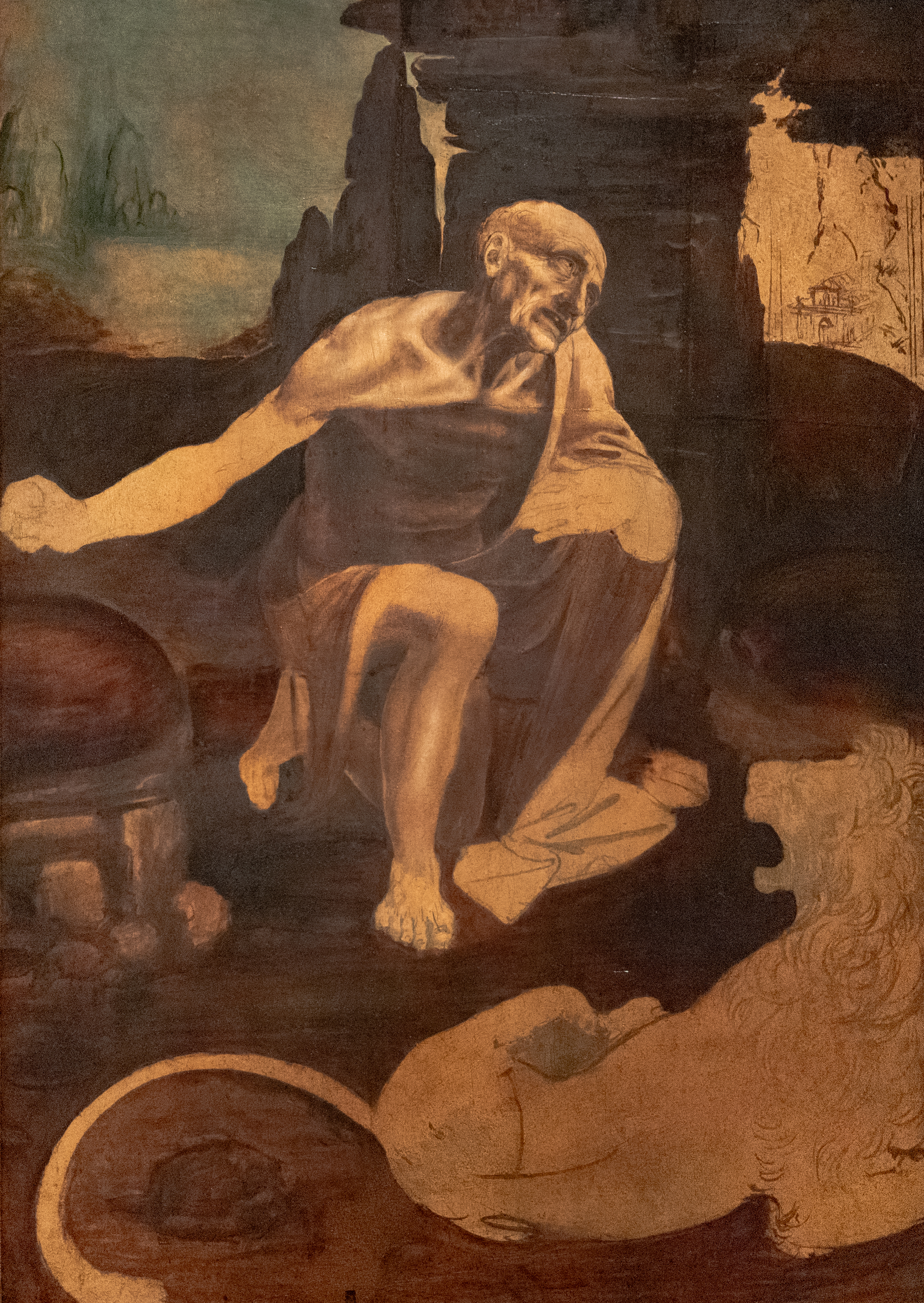
Saint Jerome in the Wilderness, Leonardo da Vinci, 1480–1490, Vatican Museums

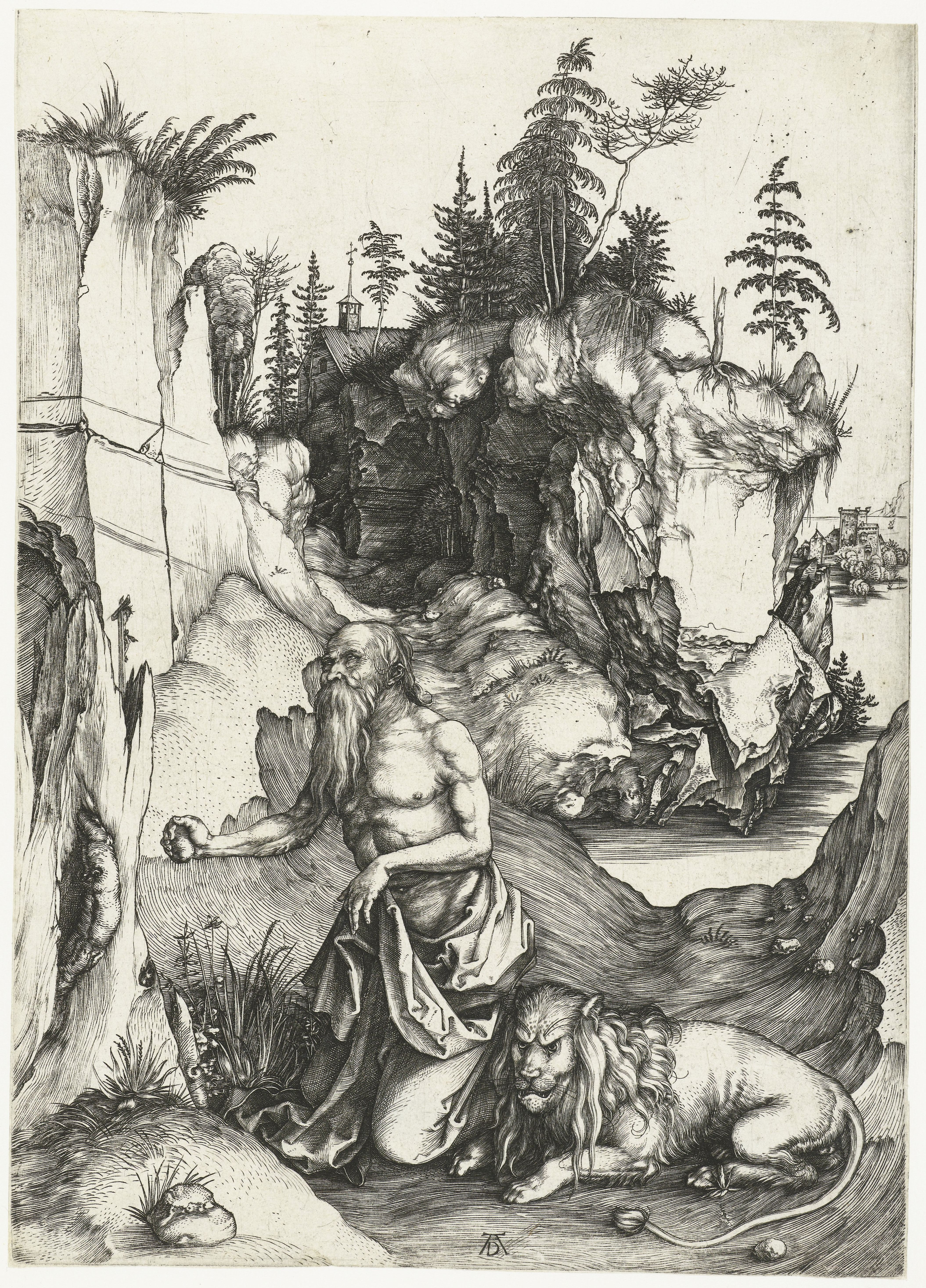
Jerome Penitent in the Wilderness, engraving, Albrecht Dürer 1494–1498

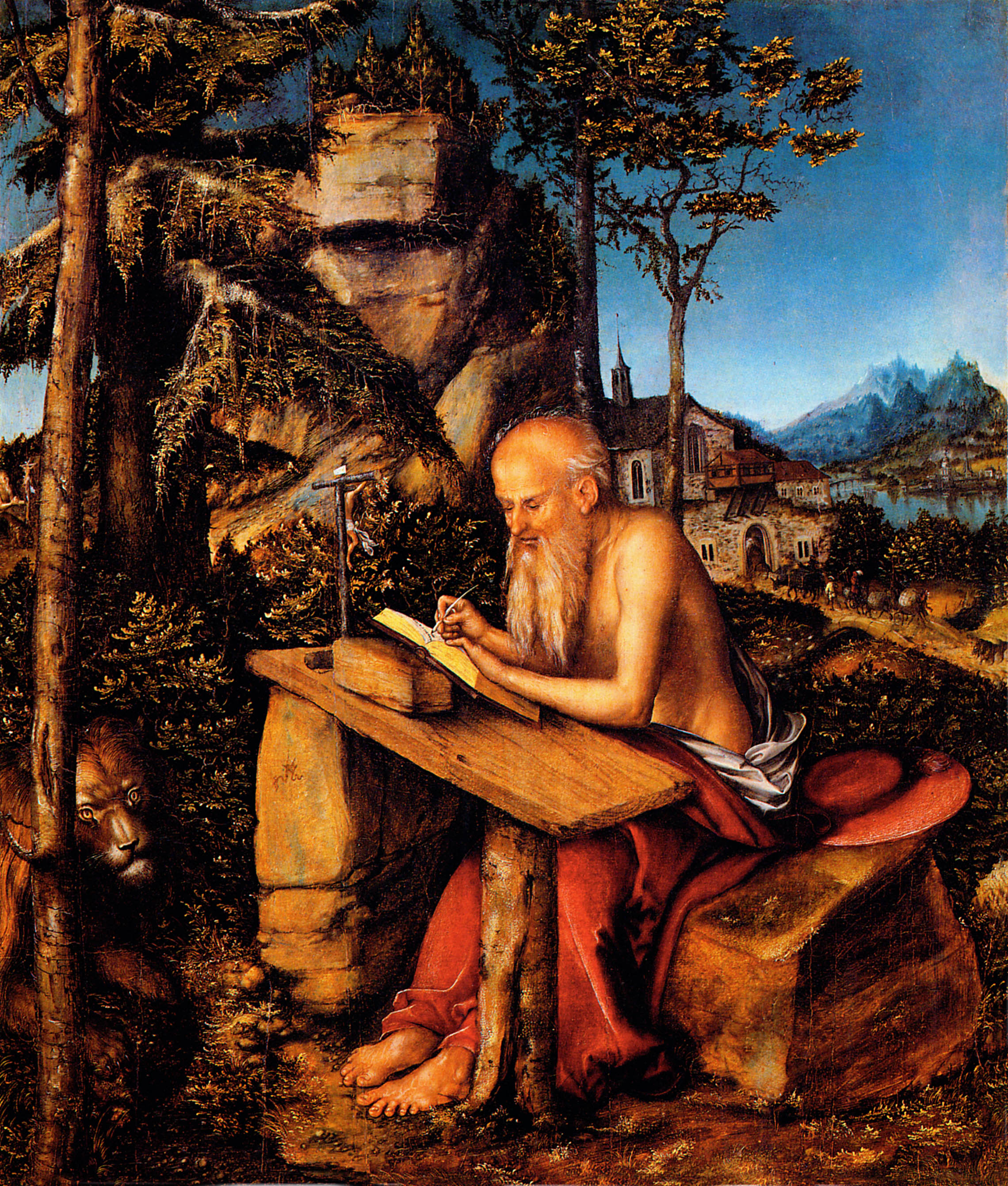
Saint Jerome in the Wilderness by Lucas Cranach the Elder c. 1515

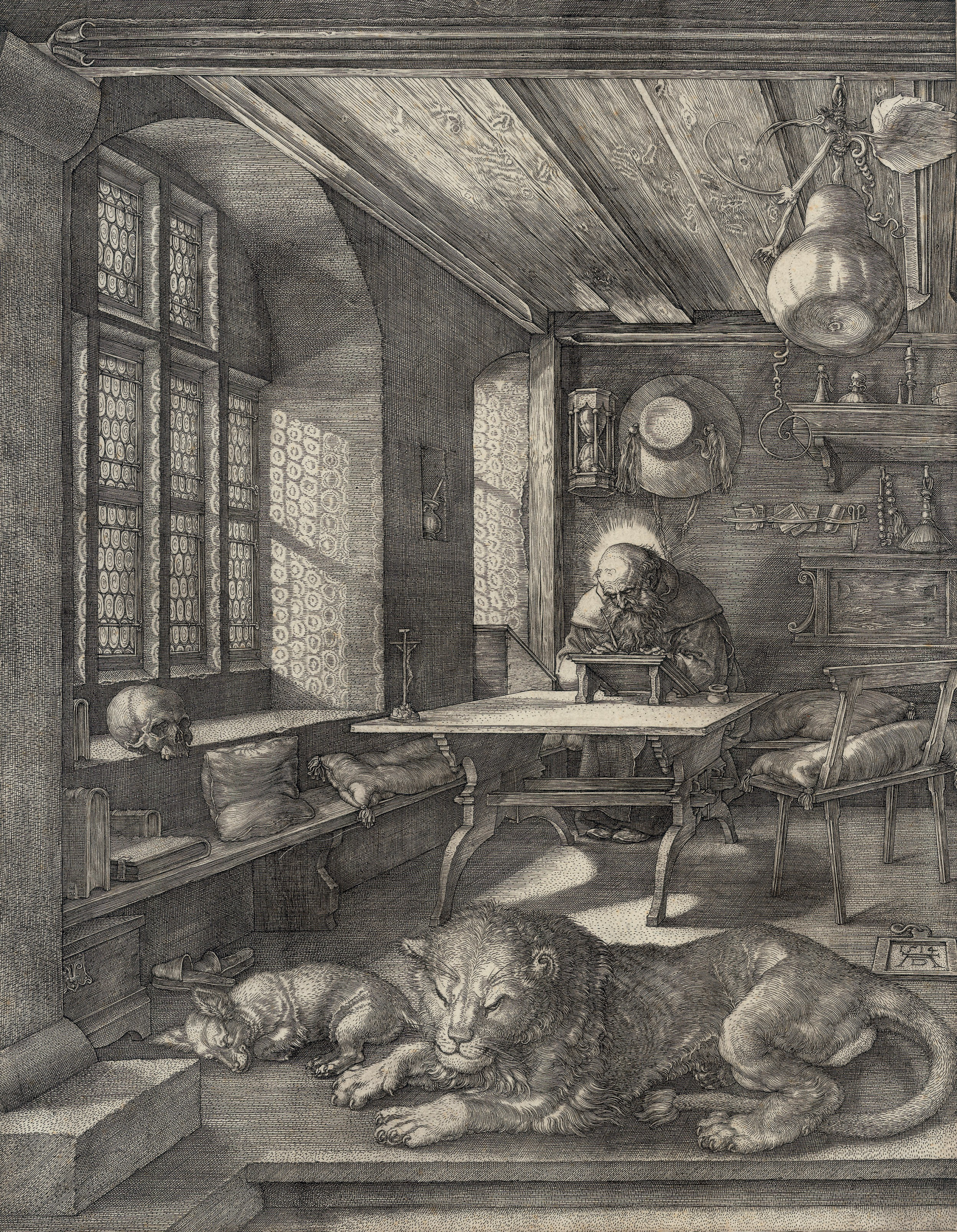
Engraving, Albrecht Dürer 1514

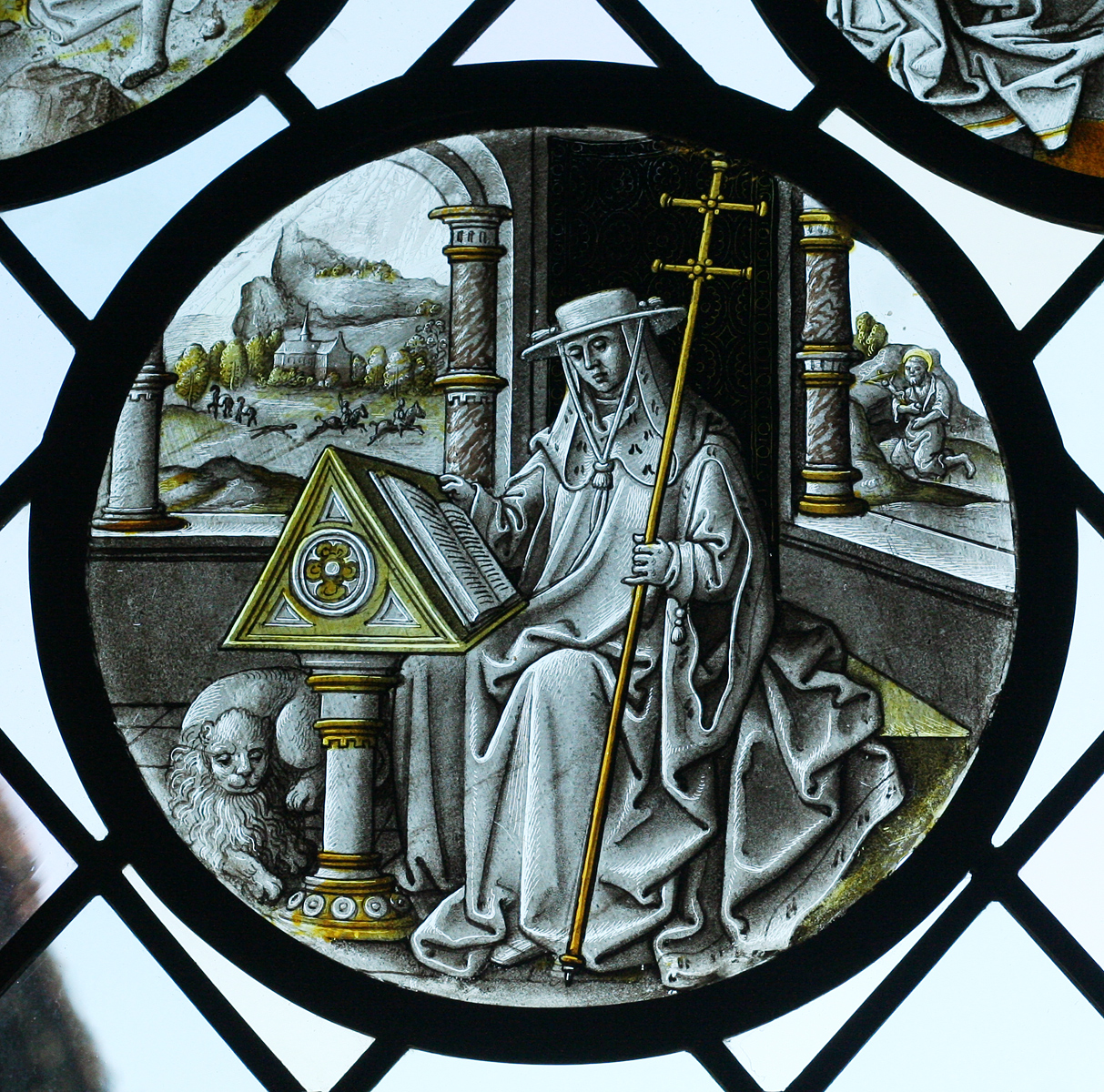
Saint Jerome c. 1520 Netherlandish stained glass window at MET

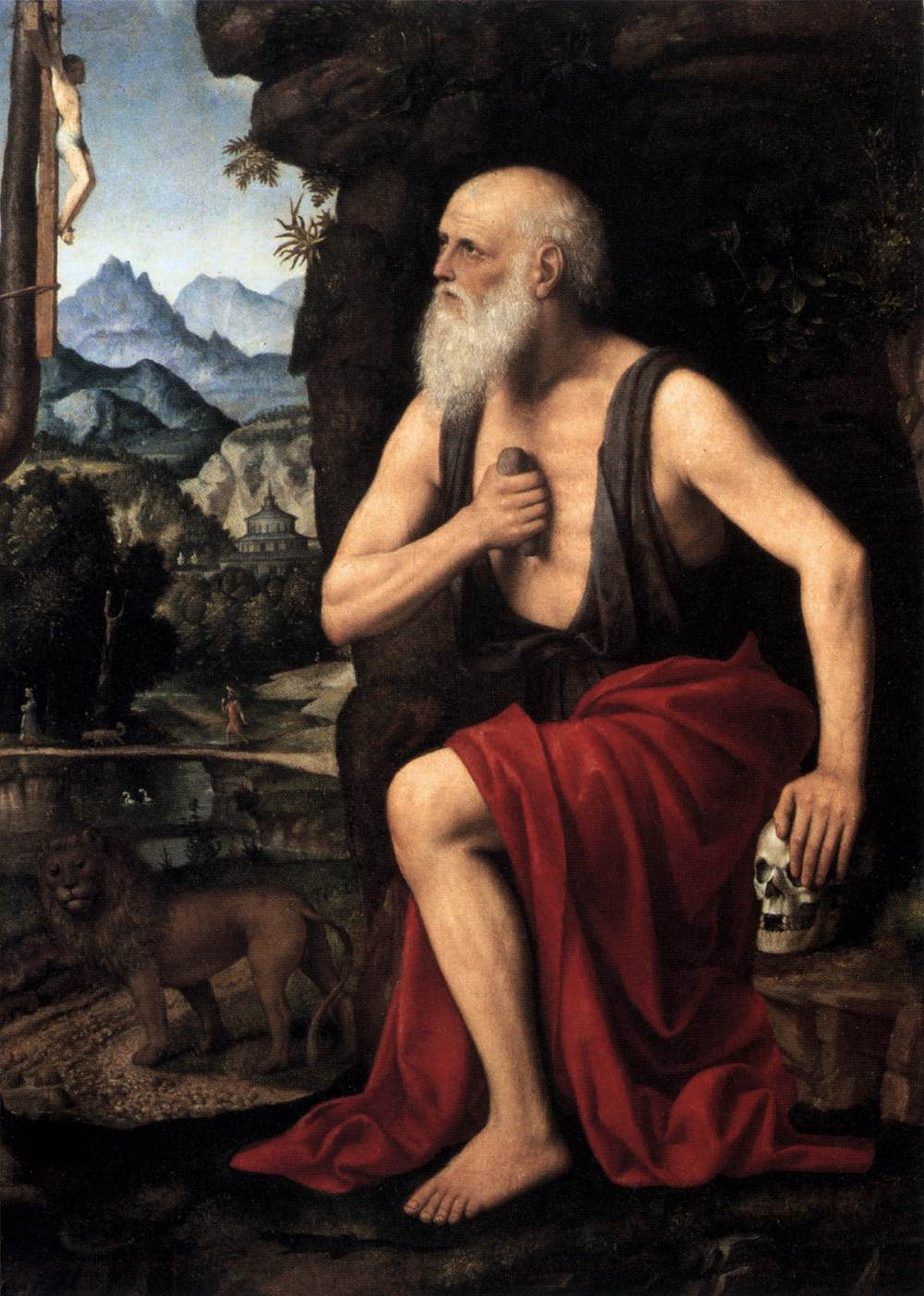
The Penitent St Jerome by Bernardino Luini, c. 1520 – c. 1525

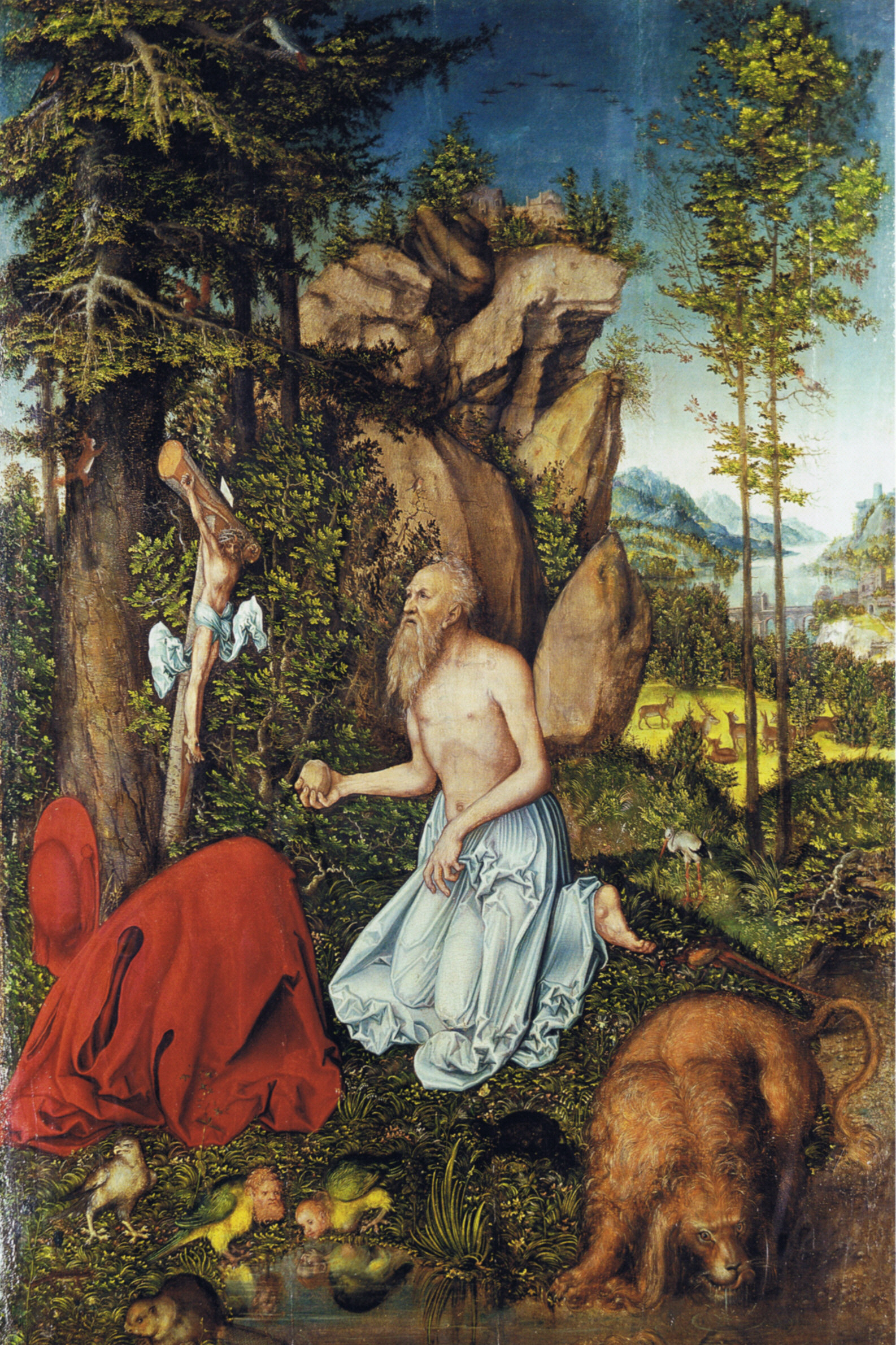
Saint Jerome by Lucas Cranach the Elder, c. 1525

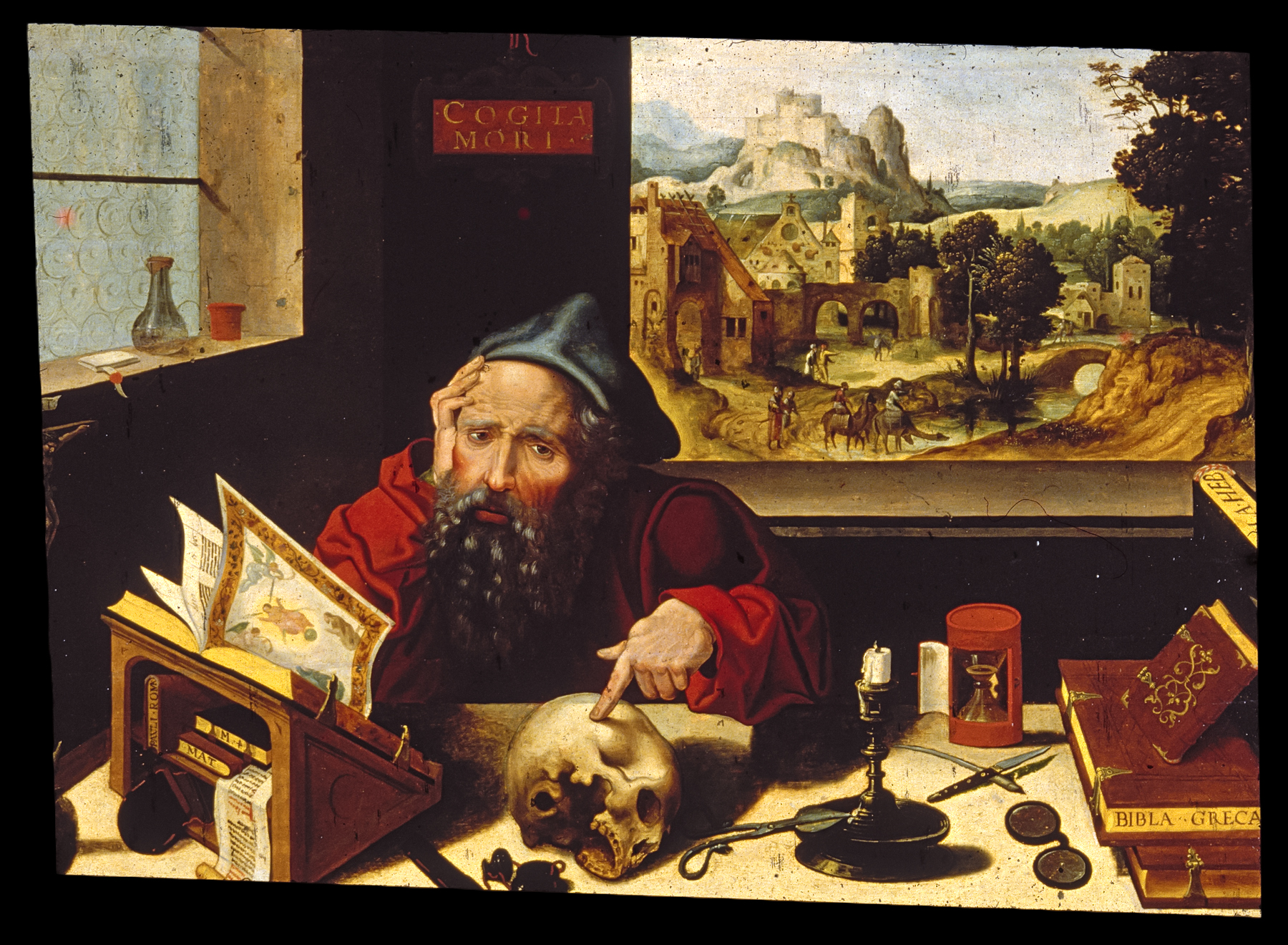
Saint Jerome in his study, c. 1530 by Pieter Coecke van Aelst and Workshop, Walters Art Museum

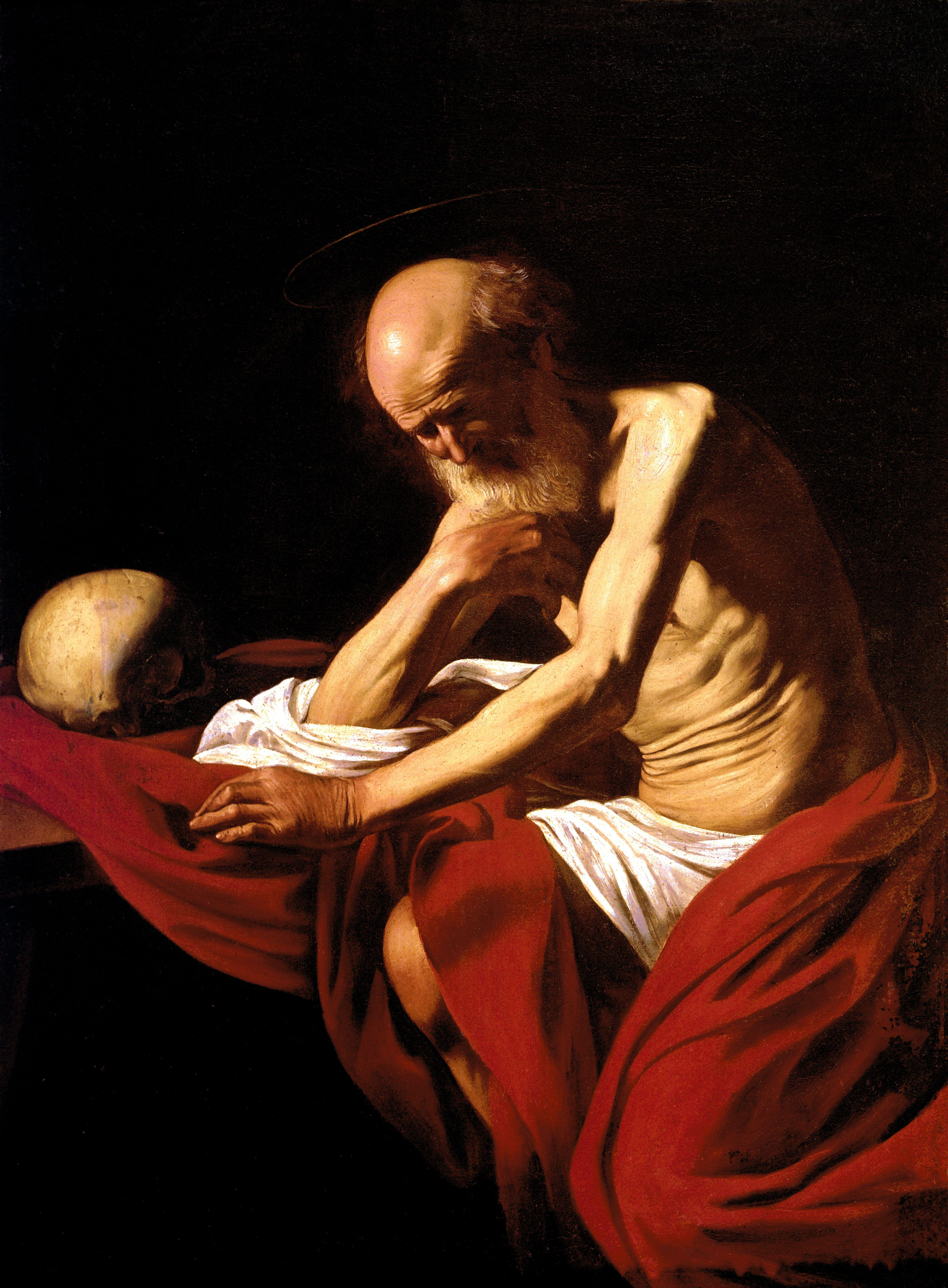
Saint Jerome penitent by Caravaggio, c. 1606

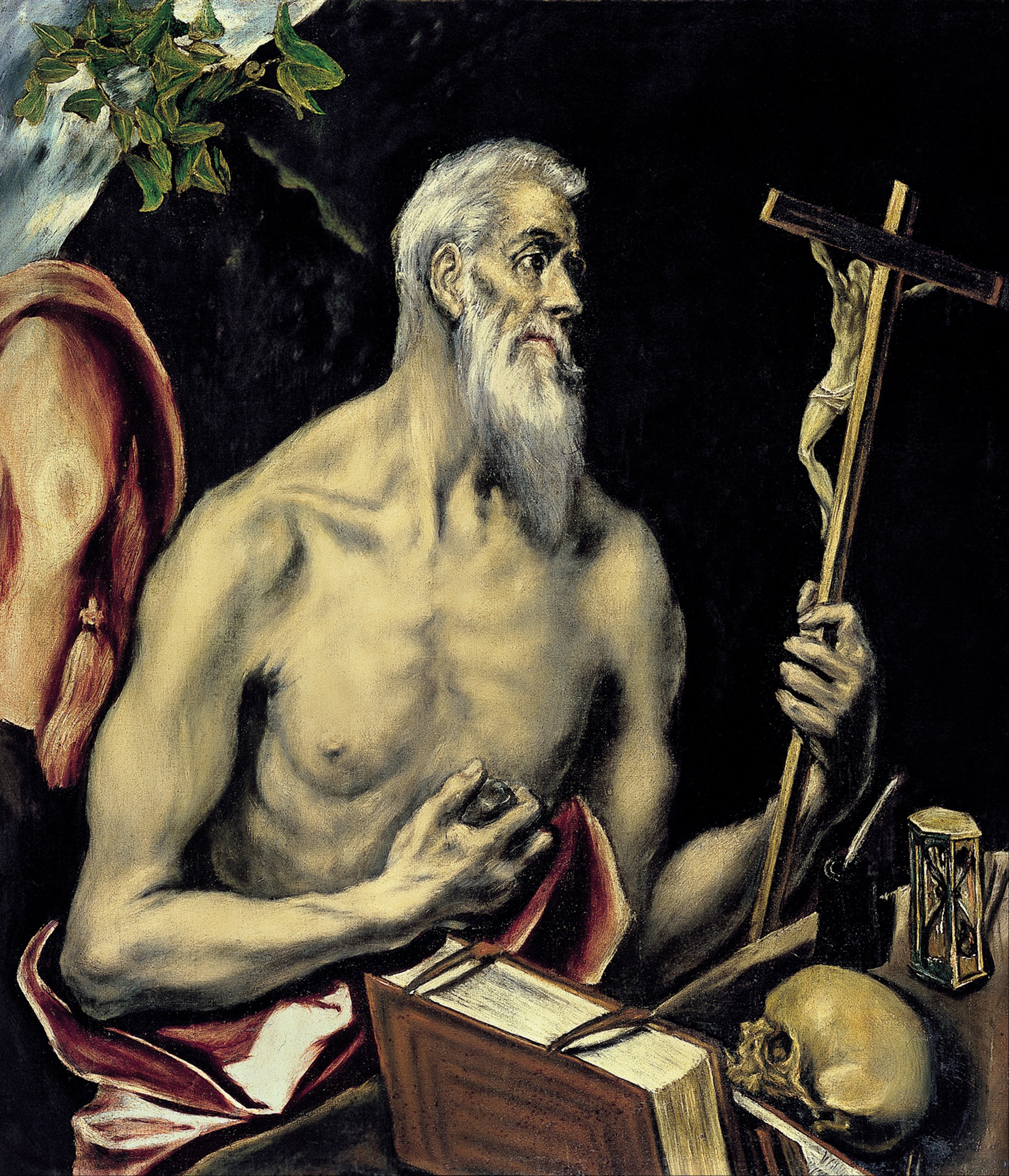
Saint Jerome by El Greco, c. 1605 – c. 1610

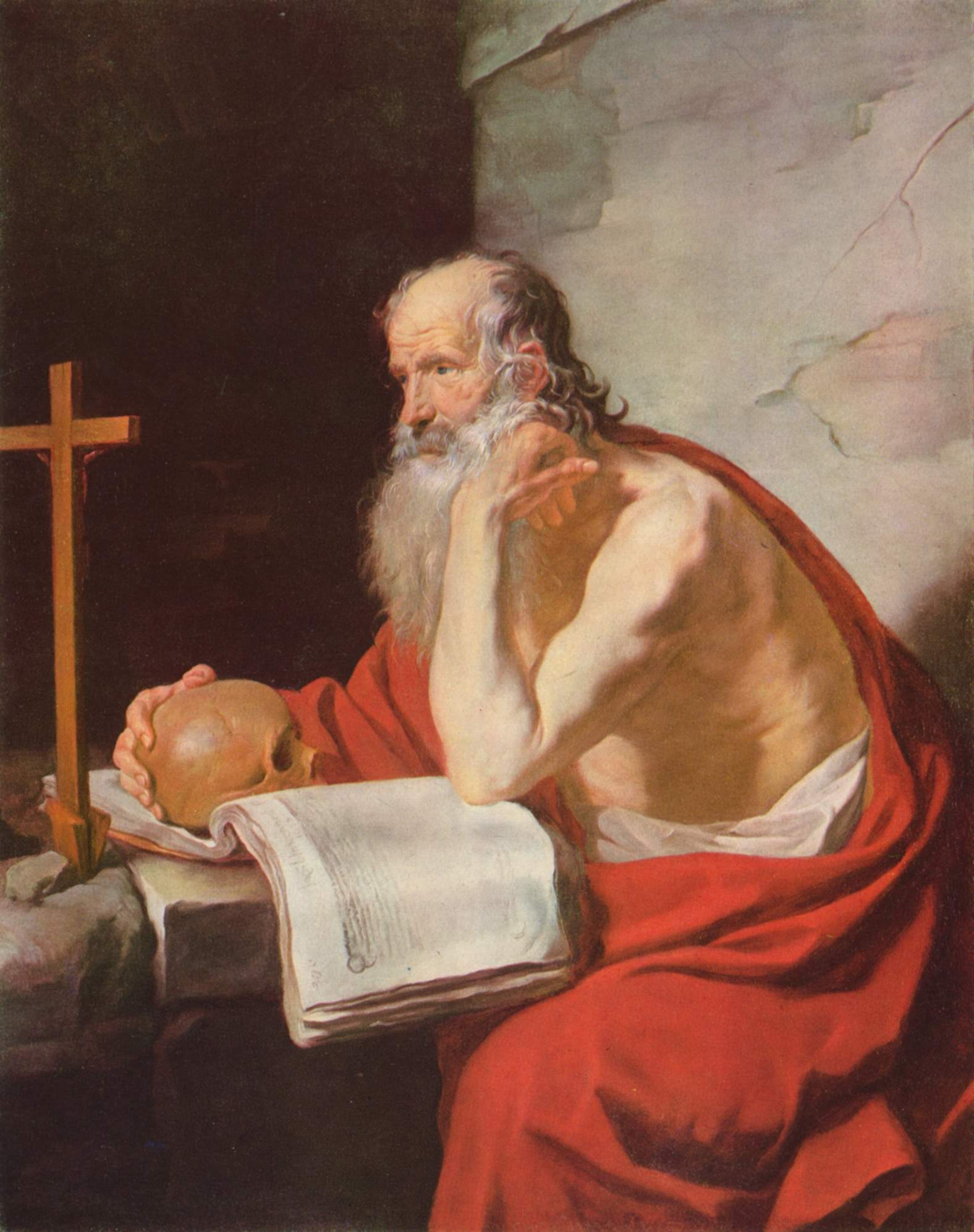
Saint Jerome by Jacques Blanchard, 1632

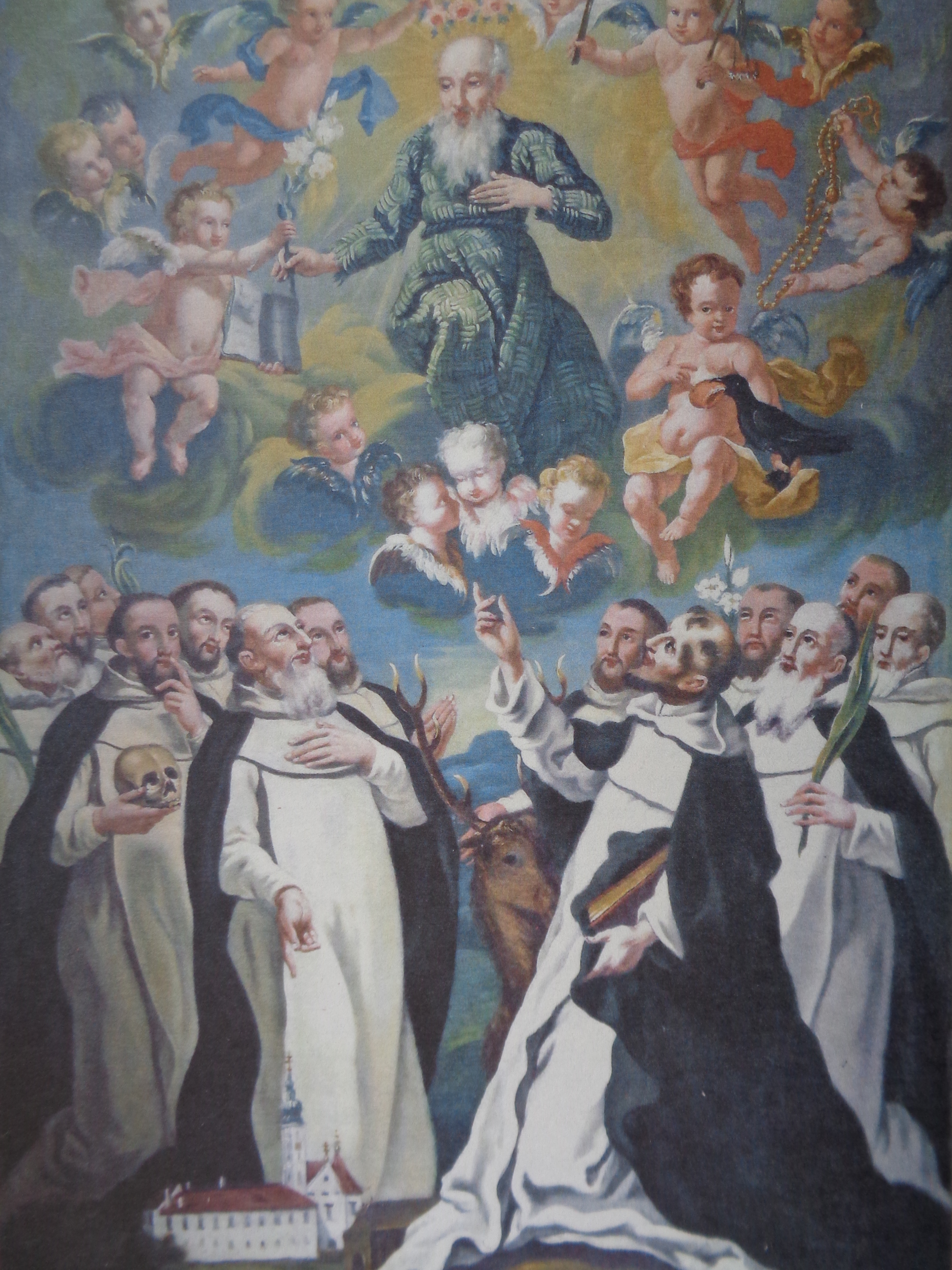
Saint Jerome and the Paulines, Gabriel Thaller, St. Jerome Church, Štrigova, Međimurje County, Croatia (18th century)

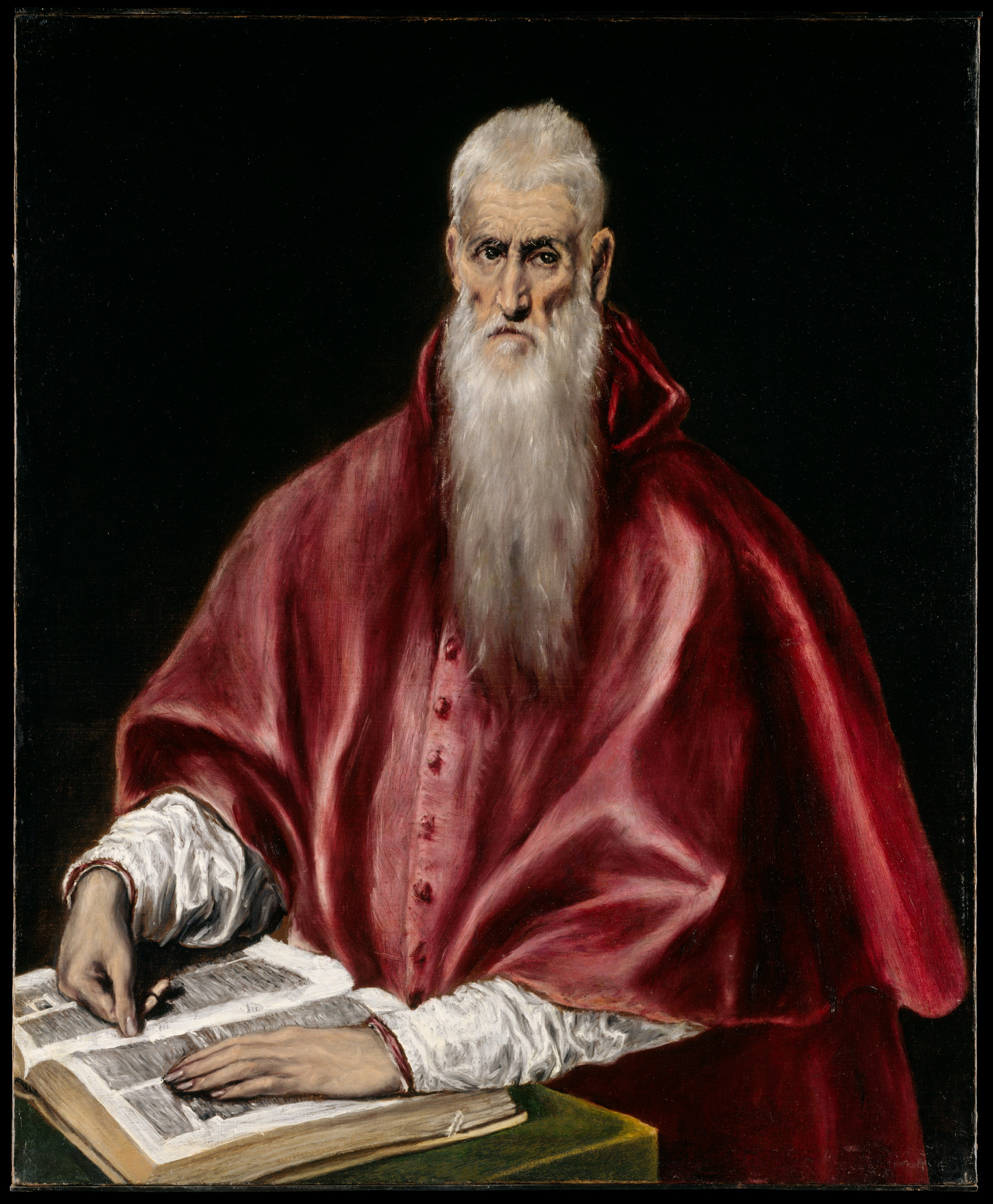
Saint Jerome by El Greco, 1610

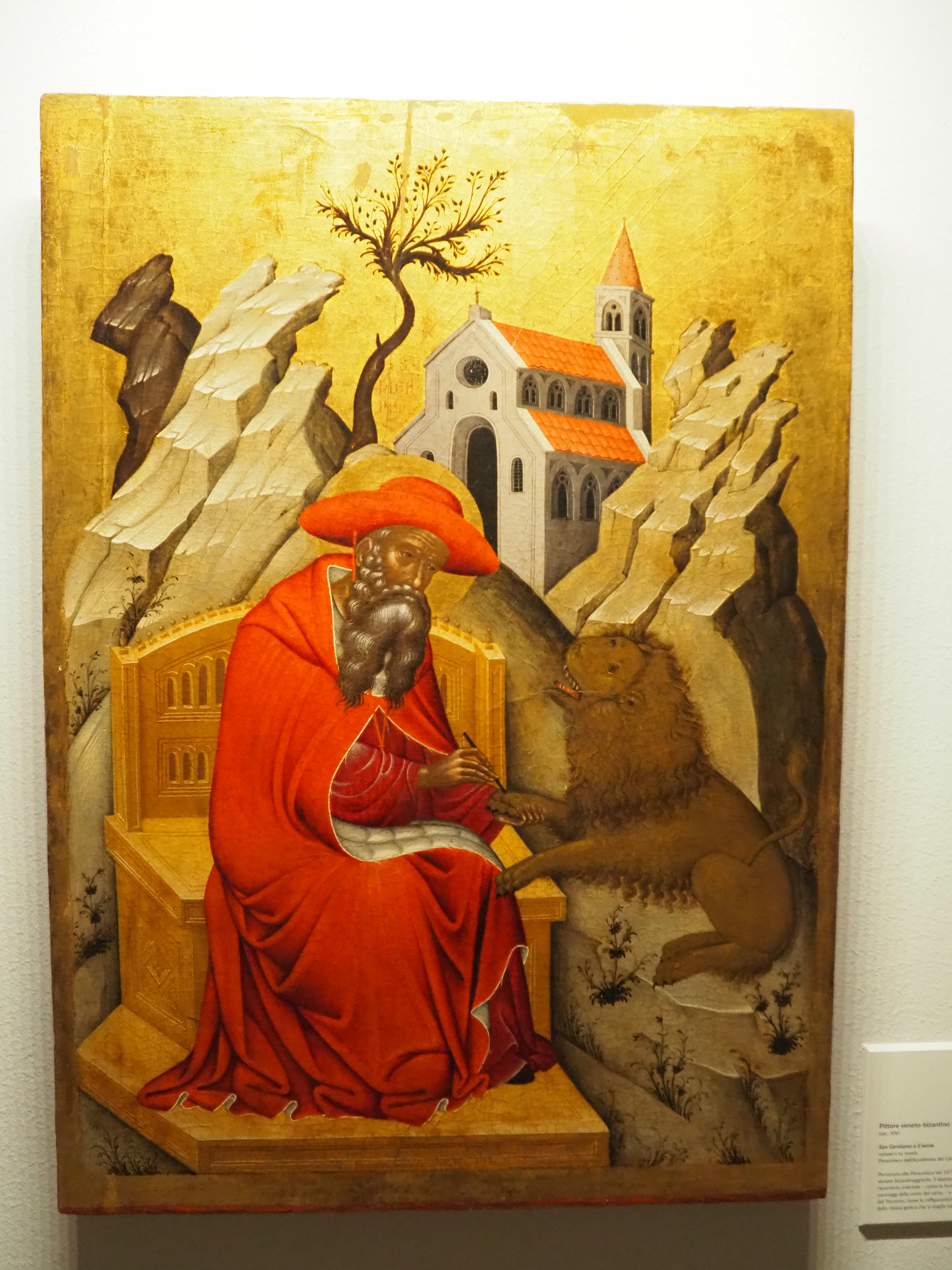
Saint Jerome and the Lion, Anonymous Venetian-Byzantine painter, 14th century

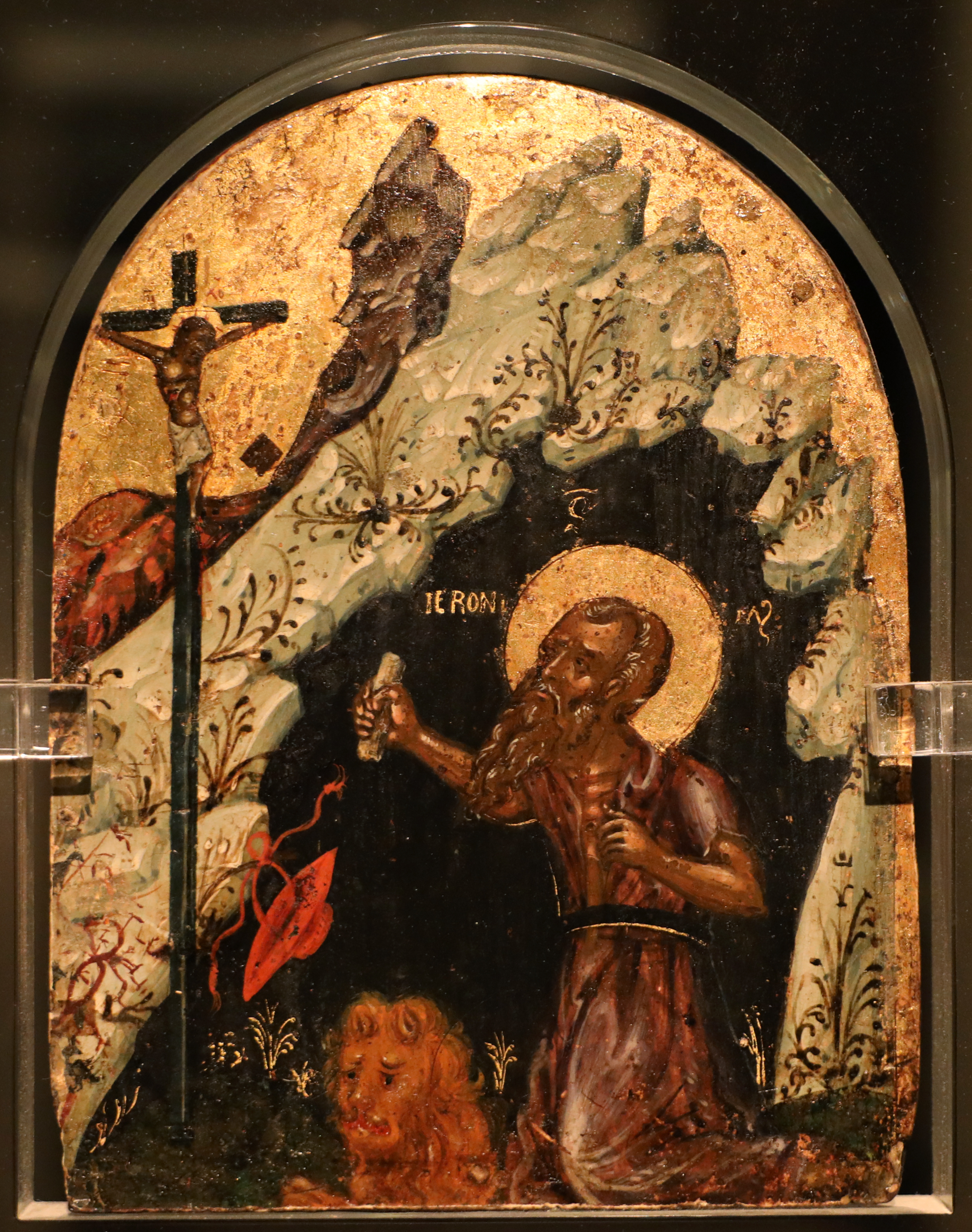
Saint Jerome with a crucifix - Byzantine and Christian Museum, Athens (17th century)

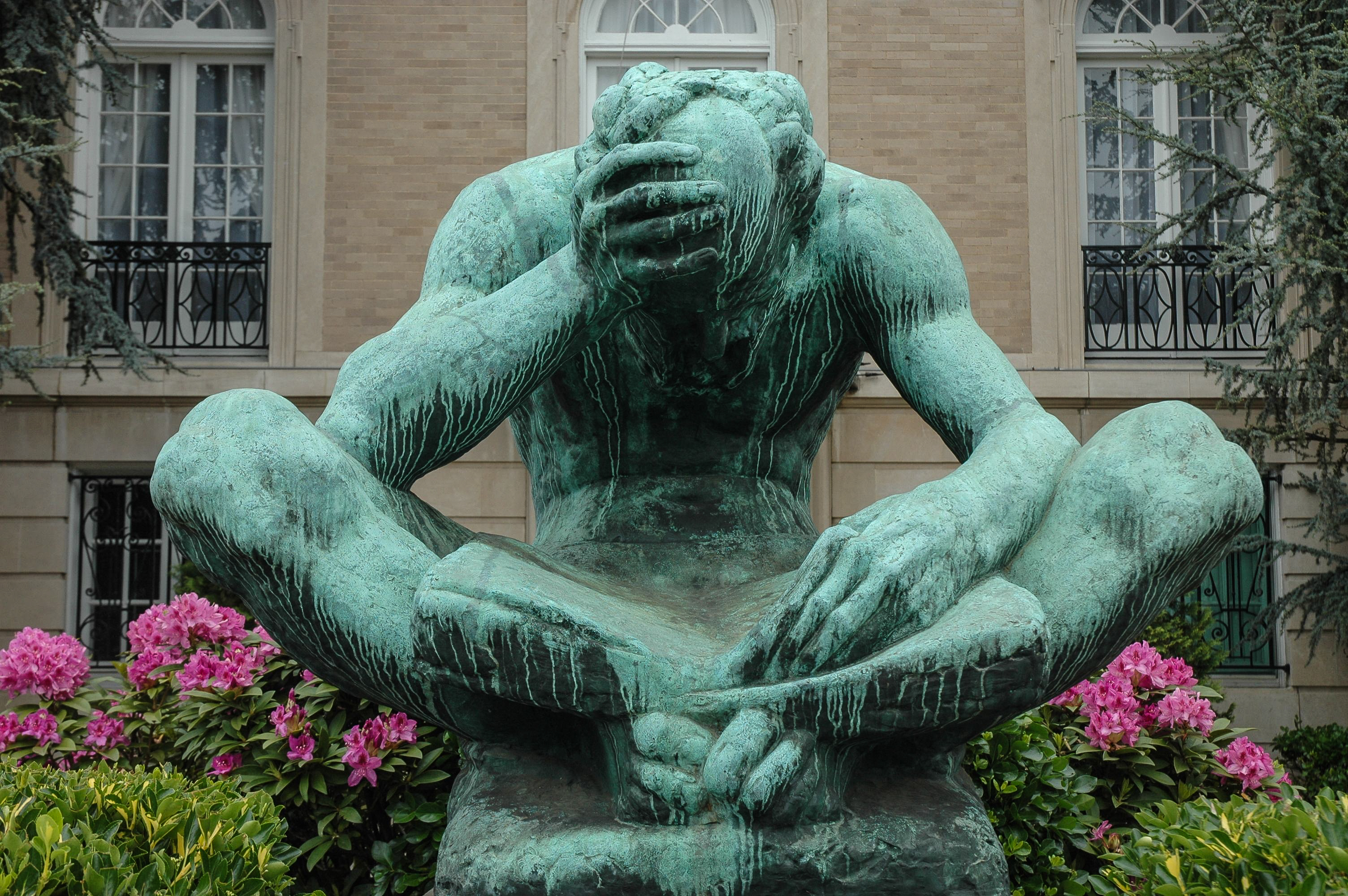
St. Jerome the Priest, by Ivan Meštrović, 1954, in Washington, D.C.

== Dedications ==
There are two cathedrals dedicated to him (in Ica and Quebec), numerous churches, as well as St. Jerome's University in Ontario and St. Jerome's College of Arts and Science in Tamil Nadu. Split Saint Jerome Airport bears his name.

== See also ==
- Androcles
- Bible translations
- Church Fathers – Early influential Christian theologians
- Eusebius of Cremona
- Ferdinand Cavallera
- Genesius of Arles
- International Translation Day – International observance, 30 September
- Letter of Jerome to Pope Damasus – Letter from Jerome requesting new translations of the gospels (c. 376/377 AD)
- Order of St. Jerome – Catholic cloistered monastics of Jerome
- Pelagius – 4th-century theologian, namesake of Pelagianism
- Prologus Galeatus – Preface by Saint Jerome to his Vulgate translations of I and II Kings and I and II Samuel
- Synod of Diospolis
