= Saint Jerome in His Study (Colantonio) =

c. 1445 painting by Colantonio

Saint Jerome In His Study
- San Girolamo nello studio (Italian)
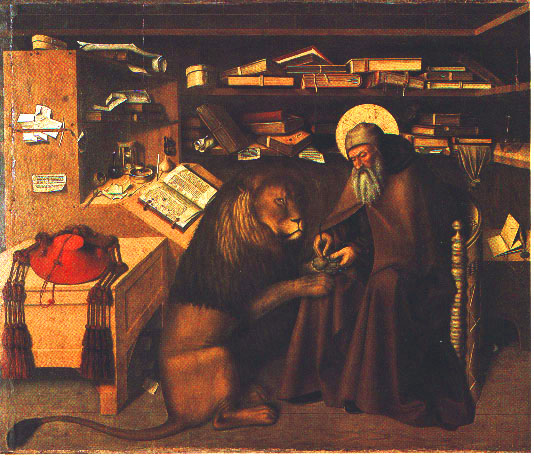
- Artist: Colantonio
- Year: c. 1445–1446
- Dimensions: 151 cm (59 in) × 178 cm (70 in)
- Location: Museo di Capodimonte

Saint Jerome in His Study is a c. 1445–1446 oil painting by Colantonio, a painter active in Naples between 1440 and around 1470. It shows the strong influence of contemporary Flemish and French art on the painter and originally formed part of a multi-panel altarpiece for the church of San Lorenzo Maggiore, later split up. The painting's dimensions are 151 centimetres (59 in) by 178 centimetres (70 in).

The work is now in the National Museum of Capodimonte.

The work shows Saint Jerome pulling a thorn from a lions paw, which was part of a legend surrounding his life. The work inspires feelings of awe and later inspired many other painters to imitate this subject and scene.

== Sources ==
- Pierluigi De Vecchi ed Elda Cerchiari, I tempi dell'arte, volume 2, Bompiani, Milano 1999. ISBN 88-451-7212-0
- Stefano Zuffi, Il Quattrocento, Electa, Milano 2004. ISBN 8837023154
  - Zuffi, Stefano (2004). Il Quattrocento (in Italian). Electa. ISBN 978-88-370-2315-7.
