= Buono de' Buoni =

Italian painter

Buono de' Buoni was an Italian painter of the Quattrocento, active in his native Naples, Italy.

According to Dominici, he flourished about the year 1430. He was a disciple of an old Neapolitan painter called Colantonio del Fiore, whom he assisted in several of his works, and after whose death he became one of the most reputable artists of his time. There are many of his works in the churches at Naples; one of the most esteemed is a painting in the church of the Restituta representing 'St. Francis receiving the Stigmata.' He died about the year 1465. He was the father of the painter Silvestro de Buoni.
