= Niccolò Antonio Colantonio =

Italian painter

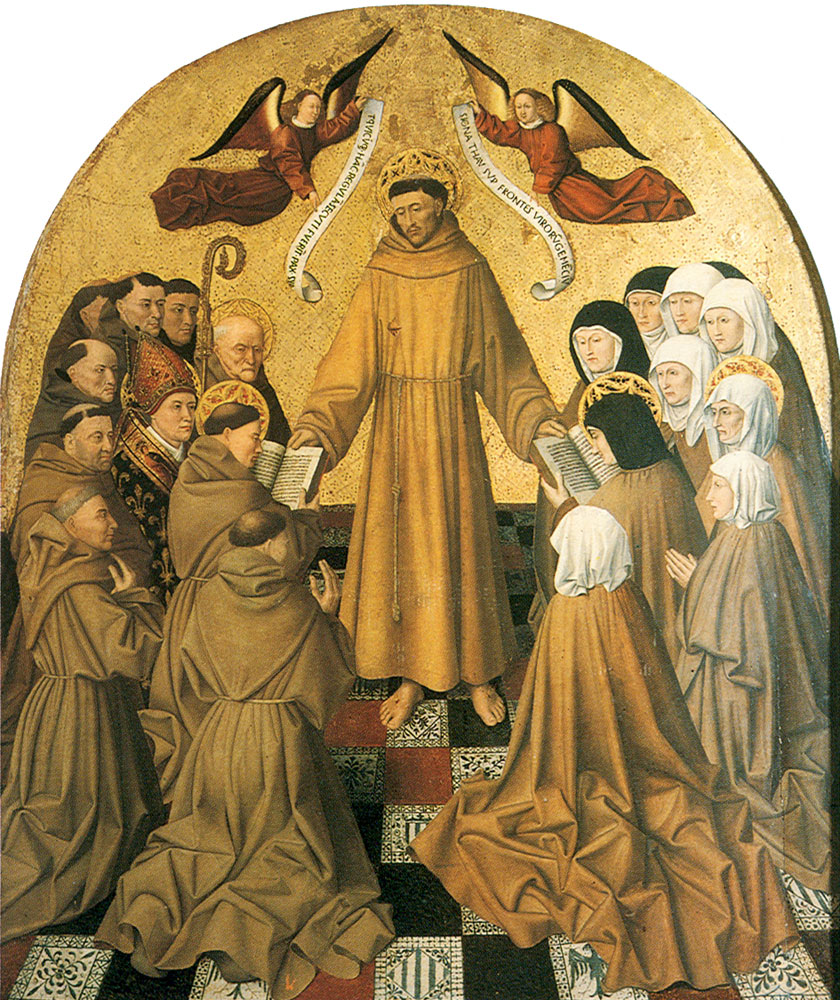
Delivery of the Franciscan Rule, c 1445

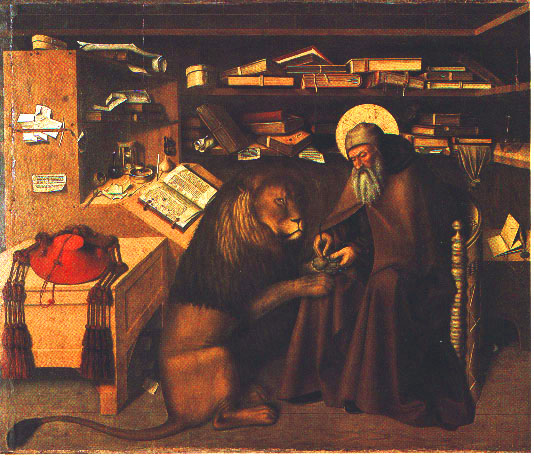
Colantonio's style was profoundly shaped by Flemish influence.

Colantonio (born Niccolò Antonio) was an Italian painter, who was the outstanding native figure in the art of Naples in the Early Renaissance.

== Life ==
Details of his life are obscure, though the Neapolitan Renaissance humanist Pietro Summonte (1463–1526) gave brief details in a letter to the Venetian Marcantonio Michiel in 1524. A birth-date of about 1420 is a generic calculation from the date of death. Colantonio was active in Naples between about 1440 and 1460 or later. He was perhaps first patronized by René d'Anjou, who ruled in Naples between 1438 and 1442. His last recorded commission is one by Queen Isabella in 1460, unless he is the Colantonio paid for decorating a room in the Castel Capuano in 1487. However Summonte says that he died young.

== Style ==
His paintings show the mingling of several cultures, as Alfonso V of Aragon had brought to Naples artists from Iberia, including the Valencian Jacomart, Burgundy, Provence, and Flanders. He synthesised his own style from all these sources and he was one of the first artists in Italy to learn the techniques of Early Netherlandish painting. He may have learnt these techniques from the Flemish artist Barthélemy d'Eyck — a putative relative of Jan van Eyck — who seems to have been in Naples around 1440.

== Main works ==
His main surviving works are two large altarpieces, the first executed in oil for San Lorenzo Maggiore, probably commissioned about 1445 by Alfonso, which was dispersed in the Napoleonic period. The main panel is Delivery of the Franciscan Rule, whose composition was probably inspired by a late thirteenth century fresco above the door of the Chapter House there, showing the saint giving his Rule to the Minor Friars and the Poor Clares. The fresco can be seen in the monastery Museum. The Colantonio painting hangs in the Museo di Capodimonte in Naples, along with Saint Jerome in His Study, full of Netherlandish detail, which was also part of the altarpiece. This was strongly influenced by a Jan van Eyck depiction of the same subject, then belonging to King Alfonso and located in Naples. Other smaller panels are in various other collections.

The second altarpiece still hangs in the church of San Pietro Martire in Naples, showing the Life of St Vincent Ferrer in eleven scenes. It includes figures which are portraits of Isabella and other members of the royal family.

Also attributed to Colantonio is a Deposition executed for San Domenico Maggiore, which draws on Rogier van der Weyden’s tapestries of scenes from the Passion (untraced), now lost but with some of the compositions known, which were then hanging in the Castel Nuovo in Naples.

== Attributed works ==
There is a small Crucifixion in the Thyssen-Bornemisza Museum in Madrid that has been attributed to Colantonio by Roberto Longhi and various other experts (mostly Italian), and by others to Antonello, but is currently attributed to an "Anonymous Valencian Artist" by the museum.

== Possible Apprentices ==
Outside Naples, he is known mainly for having been the teacher of the Sicilian Antonello da Messina, as Summonte records, probably some time between 1445 and 1455, who spread elements of his style, and northern oil painting technique, to other parts of Italy. Another pupil was Angiolo Franco of Naples. The important Spanish painter Pedro Berruguete may also have been a pupil.

== Links ==
- https://www.finestresullarte.info/de/museen/zwei-werke-von-colantonio-bereichern-die-sammlungen-des-museo-e-real-bosco-di-capodimonte#google_vignette
