= San Pietro Martire, Naples =

Church of San Pietro Martire
- Chiesa di San Pietro Martire
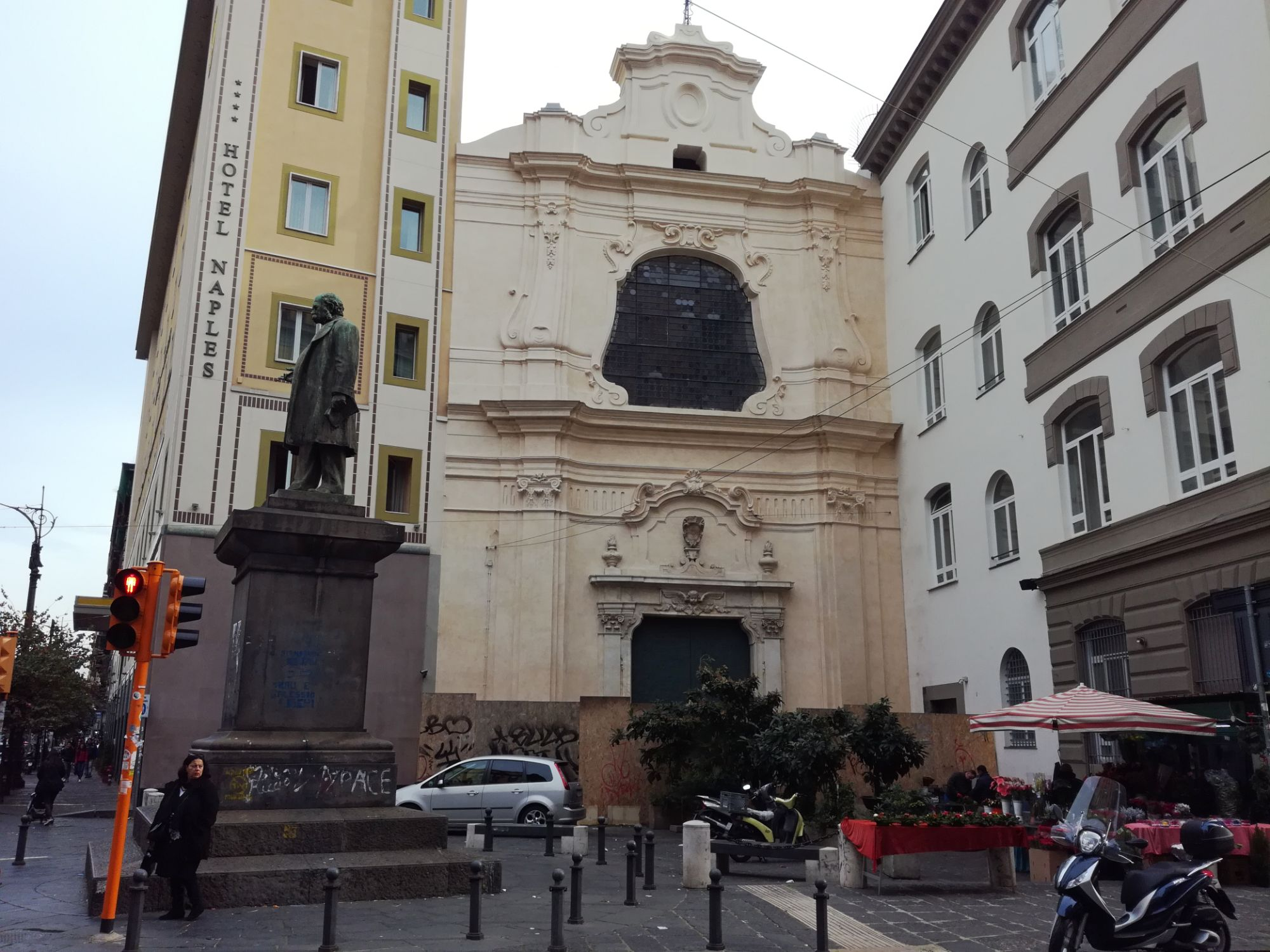
- The façade of San Pietro Martire.
- Church of San Pietro Martire
- 40.844678°N 14.257475°E
- Location: Naples; Province of Naples, Campania
- Country: Italy
- Denomination: Roman Catholic

History
- Status: Active

Architecture
- Architectural type: Church
- Style: Baroque architecture
- Groundbreaking: 1294

Administration
- Diocese: Roman Catholic Archdiocese of Naples

San Pietro Martire (Italian: "St. Peter, the Martyr") is a Roman Catholic church in Naples, Italy. It is located directly across from the principal building of the University of Naples on the main street, Corso Umberto corner with Via Porta di Massa, near the port area. In the piazza in front of the church is a statue of Ruggero Bonghi.

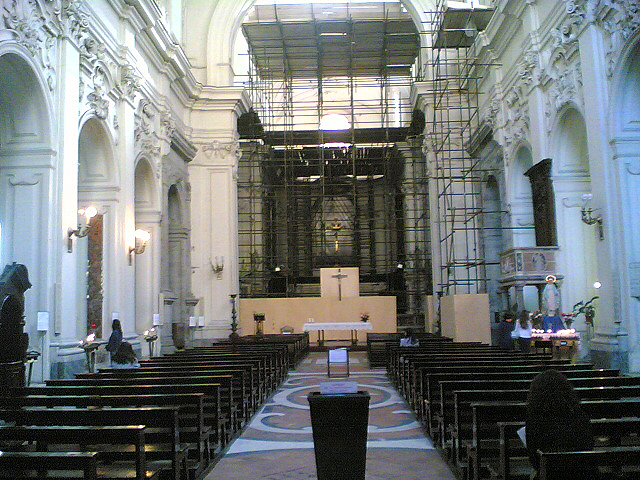
Interior

== History ==
The church belongs to the first wave of construction under the Angevin dynasty in Naples, which includes better-known structures such as the Maschio Angioino. Construction on San Pietro Martire, dedicated to Saint Peter of Verona, was started in 1294 under Charles II of Anjou to provide a facility for the Dominican Order; the church and adjacent monastery premises were finished by 1343. That year the low-lying area suffered extensively from floods. Between 1400 and 1500 the premises were expanded considerably to allow for a larger contingent of monks than the original dozen. In the 17th century, the church underwent major reconstruction based on a design of Giuseppe Astarita.

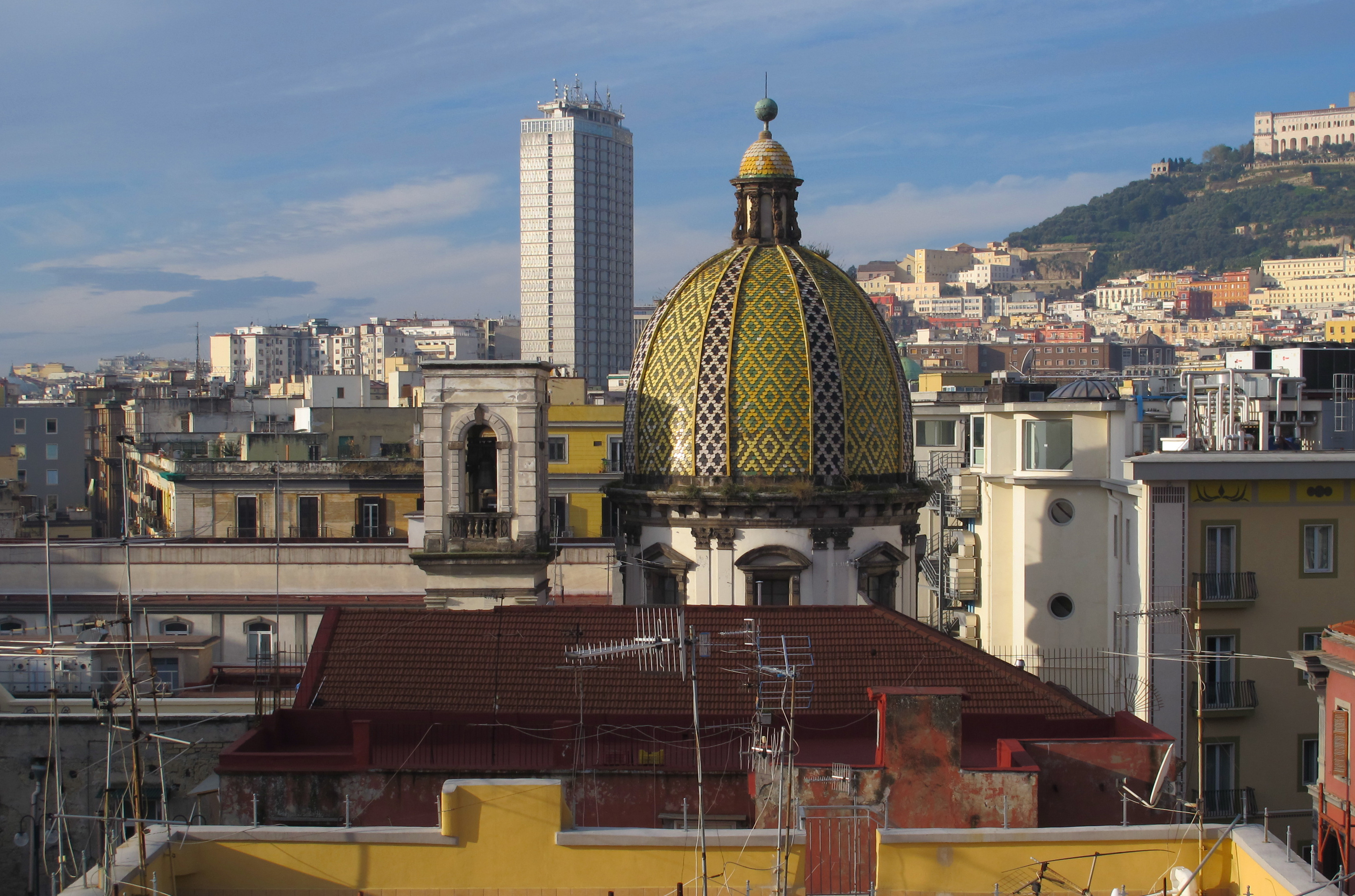
Cupola with Majolica Tiles

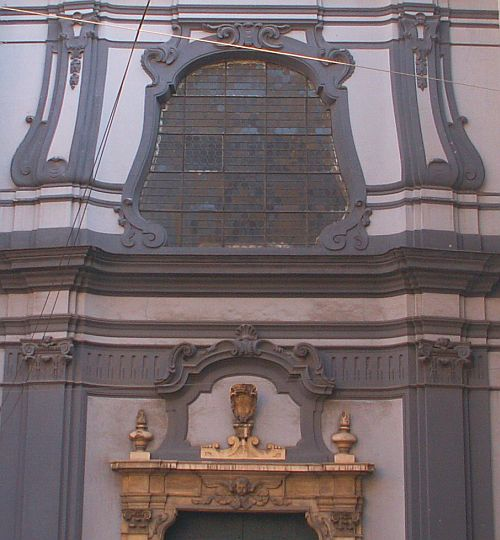
Detail of the facade

As with most Angevin buildings in Naples, San Pietro Martire underwent considerable rebuilding when the Spanish took over the Kingdom of Naples in the early 16th century. The monastic cloister underwent reconstruction then, and again in 1755 in the form that one sees today. The monastery was closed under the French rule of Murat in the early 19th century, reopened after the restoration of the Bourbon dynasty in 1816 and closed again by the new nation-state of modern Italy in 1864, leaving, however, the church open. The area around the premises underwent drastic remodelling in 1900 as part of a massive urban renewal (Risanamiento) of Naples, and both church and monastery were damaged by bombing in World War II due to their proximity to the port of Naples, a target of bombing raids. Restoration was completed in 1953 and the monastic grounds were converted to a tobacco processing facility. The entire premises, both church and monastery, were then taken over by the University of Naples. The monastery now houses lecture halls. The church is one of the university chapels.

== Interior ==
The entrance has a bas relief image of skeletal death, with an inscribed memento mori. The interior has paintings by Jacopo della Pila, Fabrizio Santafede, Andrea Falcone, Solimena, Giuseppe Marullo, Bartolomè Ordonez, Giovanni da Nola, Giovanni, and Pacio Bertini. The apse has frescoes are by Giacinto Diano and Sebastiano Conca. The latter painted a St Dominic receives the palm (symbol of martyrdom) from Christ. This is flanked by Diano's St Thomas' sermon of Joseph and St Catherine of Siena pleads for the return of the Pope from Avignon to Rome.

The lateral walls and ceiling of this chapel were frescoed by one of the brothers of the Sarnelli family. The main altar was designed by Salomone Rapi, and the balustrade by Lazzari. It has an altarpiece with the Martyrdom of St Peter of Verona painted by either Francesco Imparato or Santafede.

The first chapel on the right has an altarpiece by Silvestro Buoni (1501) and a canvas by his father, Buono di Buoni (1401). Alongside The fifth chapel also has paintings by Buono de'Buoni.

The church contains a number of ancient tomb monuments including members of the court of King Ladislaus of Naples. Isabella of Clermont is buried in this church, as well.

The sixth chapel has a Virgin of the Rosary painted by the school of Giordano. The marble work in the chapel was completed by Bartolomeo Granucci.
