= Donzelli =

Donzelli is an Italian surname. Notable people with the surname include:

- Domenico Donzelli (1790–1873), Italian opera singer
- Valérie Donzelli (born 1973), French actress, filmmaker, and screenwriter
