= Silvestro Morvillo =

Italian painter

Silvestro Morvillo, also called il Bruno or Silvestro Bruno (born 1525, active 1571–1597) was an Italian painter of the late-Renaissance period in Naples. Morvillo studied under Giovanni Bernardo Lama. One of his pupils was Antonio Sensibile born 1537.
