= Palestine Marathon =

Marathon in Palestine

- Date: late March
- Location: Bethlehem, Palestine
- Event type: Road
- Distance: Marathon
- Established: 2013; 13 years ago
- Course records: Men's: 2:28:00 (2023) (Spain) Chakib Lachgar Latrache; Women's: 3:08:16 (2023) (Denmark) Bouchra Lundgren Eriksen
- Website: Palestine Marathon
- Participants: 102 (2019)

The Palestine Marathon (Arabic: ماراثون فلسطين) is an annual road running event, including races over the marathon, half marathon, 21 km, 10 km and 5 km distances, that takes place on the streets of Bethlehem, Palestine. It was held for the first time on 21 April 2013, and has been held annually, except from 2020 to 2021 and 2024 to 2025; the marathon returned in 2026 after a two-year hiatus due to the Gaza war.

== Aims and Organisation ==
The Palestine Marathon was created to highlight restrictions in Palestinian freedom of movement, especially for Palestinian women. The idea to organize a marathon in Bethlehem was originally conceived by two Danish entrepreneurs, Lærke Hein and Signe Fischer, after the annual UNRWA marathon in the Gaza Strip was cancelled. It was cancelled because Hamas authorities would not permit women to run, as the said it's against Islamic law.

Fischer said that the idea to organise the marathon first came to her while she was stuck waiting at a checkpoint. Hein and Fischer worked with local counterparts, establishing a running group, which organised the first marathon with support from the Palestine Olympic Committee (POC). The fifth event in 2017 was directly organised by the POC, who changed the race's name from "Right to Movement" to "Free Movement".

== The 2013 event ==
The first Palestine Marathon took place on 21 April 2013. Because it was not possible to find a 42 km stretch within the Palestinian Territories without passing through Israeli checkpoints, it was decided to hold the event on an 11 km stretch, which full marathon runners would complete 4 times. The starting and finishing point was at Manger Square, just opposite the Church of the Nativity, and the route went along Manger Street, through the Aida refugee camp, along the Jerusalem Hebron Street through the Dheisheh camp, ending in the city of Al-Khader, where the runners made a U-turn to run the same route back towards Manger Square.

The Marathon was held 6 days after the Boston Marathon bombing, and many of the runners and organizers met the day before on the Manger Square for a candle light vigil in solidarity with the victims of the bombing. Jibril Rajoub, head of the POC, asked the runners to bow their heads for one minute's silence in remembrance of the victims before the race began.

In the days leading up to the course Israel barred 25 runners from the Gaza Strip to travel through Israel to reach the race in the West Bank. One of the barred runners was Majid Abu Maraheel, a long-distance runner who was the Palestinian flag bearer at the 1996 Summer Olympics, and Nader al-Masri, who represented Palestine at the 2008 Summer Olympics.

The fact that the race was held in Bethlehem, which is located within Area A of the West Bank, meant that Israeli citizens could not legally participate. Event organiser Fischer made the difficult decision to call Israelis that had registered and ask them not to attend; however, Israeli Elon Gilad posed as a Canadian in order to participate.

The winner of the men's marathon was a Palestinian runner from Jericho, Abdel Nasser Awajna, who finished with a time of 3:09, while the winner of the women's marathon was Palestinian Christine Gebler with a time of 3:38. 37% of participants were women. The marathon was documented in a 2014 film by Danish filmmakers Simon Caspersen and Johan Blem Larsen.

== The 2014 event ==
The route was the same as in 2013, starting and finishing point from Manger Square. Over 3000 runners from 39 different nationalities signed up for the race, and 34% of the runners were women. One of the runners was the photographer Jacob Holdt. Finisher's medals were carved from local olive wood.

Runners from Gaza, including Nader al-Masri, were once again refused travel permits for the event by Israeli authorities. Justifying the decision, the body for issue permits stated that “the marathon is supported by the Palestinian Authority and is tainted by political shades which delegitimize the State of Israel.” The decision was affirmed by the Supreme Court of Israel.

Despite greater security concerns to the prior year, including a reported threat alleging that Hamas would target the event, at least two Israeli citizens illegally entered Area A in order to participate in the marathon.

== The 2015 event ==
The 2015 Palestine Marathon took place on 27 March following the same route as the two previous years starting from Manger Square. Danish organisers Hein and Fischer began to hand over organising the marathon to Zeidan and other local members of Right to Movement, alongside the POC. Although they initially had concerns that international attendance would drop off due to the 2014 Gaza War, a total of 3093 participants in the event - the highest yet. 49 nationalities were present, and a number of members of the Danish parliament participated, including Stine Brix, Pernille Skipper, Jens Joel and Liv Holm Andersen.

39% of the runners were female, the highest in the race's history - and, according to organisers, one of the highest rates in the world. Prominent representatives for the event included Palestinian women Eitedal Ismail, the Director General of the Higher Council of Youth & Sports for the State of Palestine, and Vera Baboun, the first female Mayor of Bethlehem.

For the first time, 46 runners from Gaza were allowed to participate in the event, and the winner was Nader al-Masri from the Gaza Strip, whose house had been destroyed in the 2014 Gaza War. Gazans also placed second and third in the men's event.

== The 2016 event ==
The Palestine marathon in 2016 took place on 1 April, with the same route as the previous years. It was organised by Right to Movement, Eitedal Ismail, and other partners. Support for travel arrangements was provided by Yamsafer. The race had over 4000 participants - the largest number ever, despite participants from Gaza being denied permits to travel to the event, including the winner of the third marathon, Nader al-Masri. The finishing time was the fastest to date, with winner Mervin Steenkamp finishing in 02:35:26, 15 minutes ahead of the second-placed runner.

== The 2017 event ==
The 2017 Palestine Marathon took place on 31 March with the same route as the previous years. For the first year, the race included a 2k "family race", alongside the 10 km, half marathon and full marathon races. The race had approximately 5,500 to 6000 registered participants from 65 different countries, including 150 from the United Kingdom. The number of registered female participants reached 50% of registrations for the first time in the Palestine Marathon's history - far above the global average of 30%. 500 runners with disabilities competed in the event; Bethlehem Governor Jibrin al-Bakri said that the event “opens the space for reinforcing spots and concentrating on different social cases including rights of people with disabilities.” For the first time, the POC took direct responsibility for organising the race, changing the event's name from "Right to Movement" to "Free Movement".

36 of the 50 registered participants from Gaza were denied permits to travel to the event, along with six sports administrators. For the third time, 2015 winner Nader al-Masri was banned from participating.

British comedian and noted marathon runner Eddie Izzard registered to run the 2017 Palestine Marathon. However, he was criticized by the Palestinian Boycott, Divestment and Sanctions movement because he had performed a gig in Tel Aviv the day prior to the event. The event organisers released a statement via Twitter that Izzard "cannot run" if he performed the show. Izzard replied in a statement that the Palestinian Authority was allowing him to run, but due to "others" not wanting him to, he would not participate.

== The 2018 event ==
The Palestine Marathon in 2018 took place on 23 March with the same route as the previous years. The race had over 7000 participants - the largest number ever, despite participants from Gaza being denied permits to travel to the event.

== The 2019 event ==
The Palestine Marathon was held on 22 March 2019, with more than 8,000 runners from 76 countries participated in the event.

== The 2022 event ==
After two years of hiatus due to the COVID-19 pandemic, the 2022 Palestine Marathon was held on 18 March 2022, with over 10,000 runners participated in the event. The marathon started at the Church of the Nativity in Bethlehem.

== The 2023 event ==
The 2023 Palestine Marathon was held on 10 March 2023.

== The 2026 event ==
After a two year gap due to the war in Gaza, the Palestine Marathon was held once more on 8 May 2026. The marathon was held both in the West Bank and the Gaza Strip, with both of its started points the Church of the Nativity in Bethlehem and Wadi Gaza bridge respectively. The marathon was organized by the Palestine Olympic Committee along with the Egyptian Committee for Gaza Relief and other organizations.

== List of winners of the Palestine Marathon ==
Edition	Year	Men's winner	Time (h:m:s)	Women's winner	Time (h:m:s)
9th	10 March 2023	Chakib Lachgar Latrache (ESP)	2:28:00	Bouchra Lundgren Eriksen (DEN)	3:08:16
8th	18 March 2022	Yuriy Blahodir (UKR)	2:46:26	Frida Södermark (SWE)	3:14:02
7th	22 March 2019	Quentin Guillon (FRA)	2:42:41	Svitlana Stanko-Klymenko (UKR)	3:15:14
6th	23 March 2018	Yuriy Blahodir (UKR)	2:45:56	Anaïs Quemener (FRA)	3:15:22
5th	31 March 2017	Mervin Steenkamp (RSA)	2:51:06	Katie Desprez (USA)	3:15:10
4th	1 April 2016	Mervin Steenkamp (RSA)	2:35:26	Alicia Saavedra (SWE)	3:30:40
3rd	27 March 2015	Nader al-Masri (PLE)	2:57:14	Maibritt Kristoffersen (DEN)	3:19:26
2nd	11 April 2014	Anders Rømer (DEN); Morten Hvidtfeldt (DEN)	2:51:13	Paola Addari (ITA)	3:30:13
1st	21 April 2013	Abed El Naser Awajneh (PLE)	3:09:47	Christine Gebler (USA)	3:36:37
