= Siege of the Church of the Nativity =

2002 siege of a suspected Palestinian militant hideout by Israeli forces

Coordinates: 31°42′17″N 35°12′28″E

- Part of Operation Defensive Shield
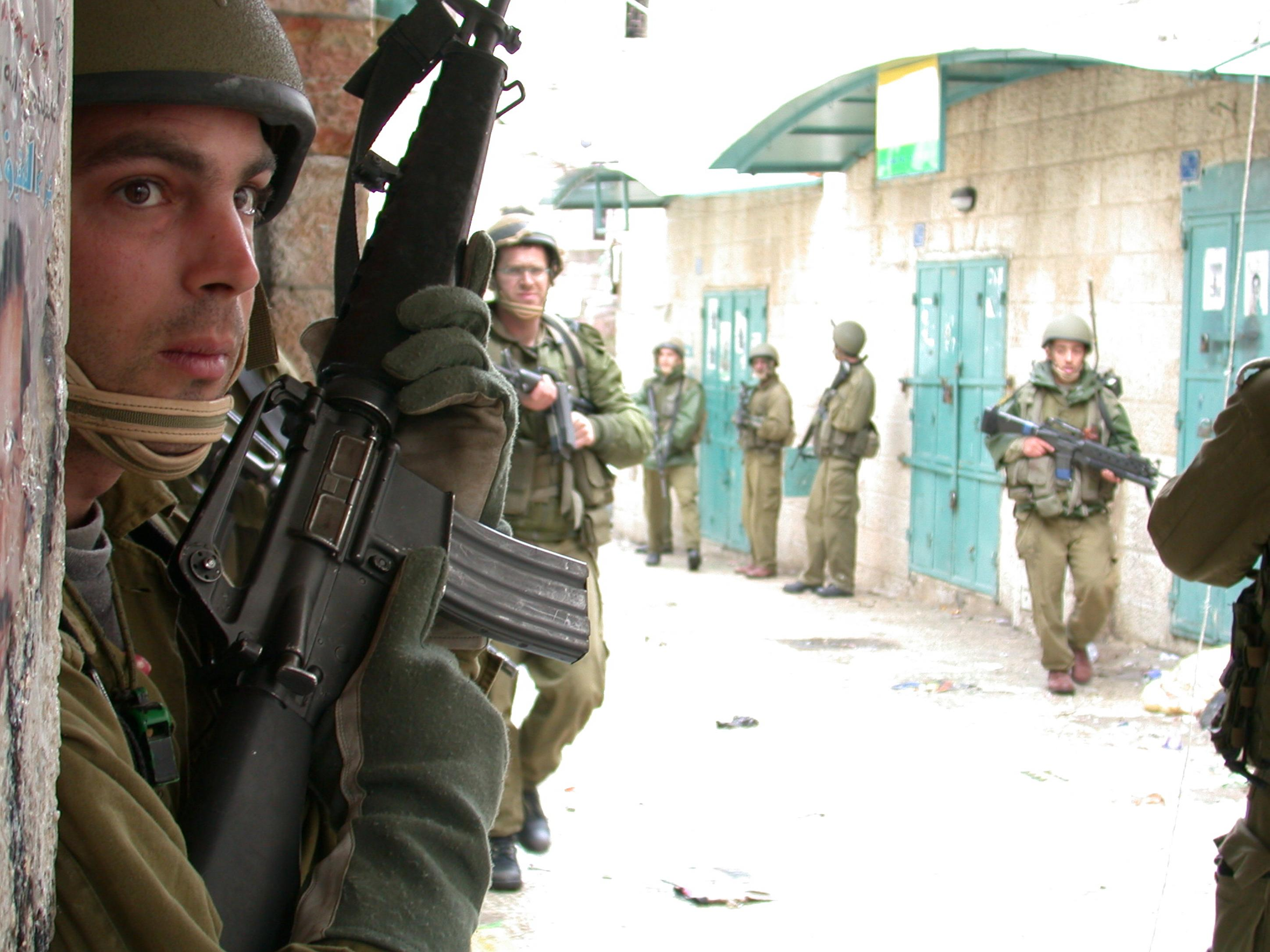
- Israeli soldiers in Bethlehem during the operation
Date	2 April – 10 May 2002
Location	Bethlehem, West Bank
Result	Negotiated Palestinian retreat

Belligerents
Israel	(Palestinian Authority) Fatah (Al-Aqsa Martyrs' Brigades, Tanzim); Palestinian Security Forces; Hamas

Strength
1 reserve infantry brigade	39

Casualties and losses
2 wounded	8 killed
- 1 Armenian monk wounded

From 2 April to 10 May 2002, the Church of the Nativity in Bethlehem in the West Bank was besieged by the Israel Defense Forces (IDF), targeting suspected Palestinian militants who had taken shelter in the church.

As part of Operation Defensive Shield, the IDF occupied Bethlehem and attempted to capture suspected Palestinian militants. Dozens of them fled into the Church of the Nativity and sought refuge. IDF surrounded the site and besieged the suspected militants and non-militants at the site, which included approximately 200 monks resident in the church and other Palestinians who had arrived at the site for other reasons. The Franciscan Order maintained no hostages were held, while Israeli sources claimed the monks and others were being held hostage by gunmen.

After 39 days, an agreement was reached, according to which the militants turned themselves in to Israel and were exiled to Europe and the Gaza Strip.

== Prelude ==
The IDF expected the operation in Bethlehem to be relatively simple, after the Paratroopers Brigade had raided the city several times in the previous months. The mission was given to a reserve infantry brigade, the Jerusalem Brigade, under the command of Colonel Rami Tzur-Hacham. During previous IDF entries into the city, wanted persons found shelter in the Church of the Nativity. This time, a force from the Shaldag Unit was sent to block the entrance to the site.

The troops were airlifted into the city and met disorganized Palestinian resistance. Israeli Air Force helicopters landed the force half an hour too late. When the force arrived, the wanted persons were already there. Dozens of militants, Fatah, Hamas, Palestinian Islamic Jihad and Palestinian Security Forces men fled into the church to fortify, along with some 200 monks and other Palestinians who arrived at the site for different reasons, whom Israel claimed were held as hostages by the gunmen, an argument denied by Giacomo Bini Minister General of the Order of Friars Minor, who stated:

I wish to firmly state that the Friars and Sisters of the religious community in Bethlehem cannot be considered as hostages. They have freely chosen to remain in that place, the custody of which has been entrusted to them by the Holy See, and which constitutes their home. The other 200 Palestinians besieged inside the Basilica have taken refuge there by force in order to flee from the sweep and search by the Israeli army, just as had happened to the 5 Italian journalists during the first day of the siege. Up to now they have not committed any act of violence or abuse of power against the religious community.

A senior Tanzim commander, Abdullah Abu-Hadid added:

"The idea was to enter the church in order to create international pressure on Israel....We knew beforehand that there was two years' worth of food for 50 monks. Oil, beans, rice, olives. Good bathrooms and the largest wells in old Bethlehem. You didn't need electricity because there were candles. In the yard they planted vegetables. Everything was there."

Among the wanted persons in the church were the governor of Bethlehem, Muhammad al-Madani, and Abdullah Daoud, the Palestinian Authority intelligence chief in Bethlehem.

== Siege ==
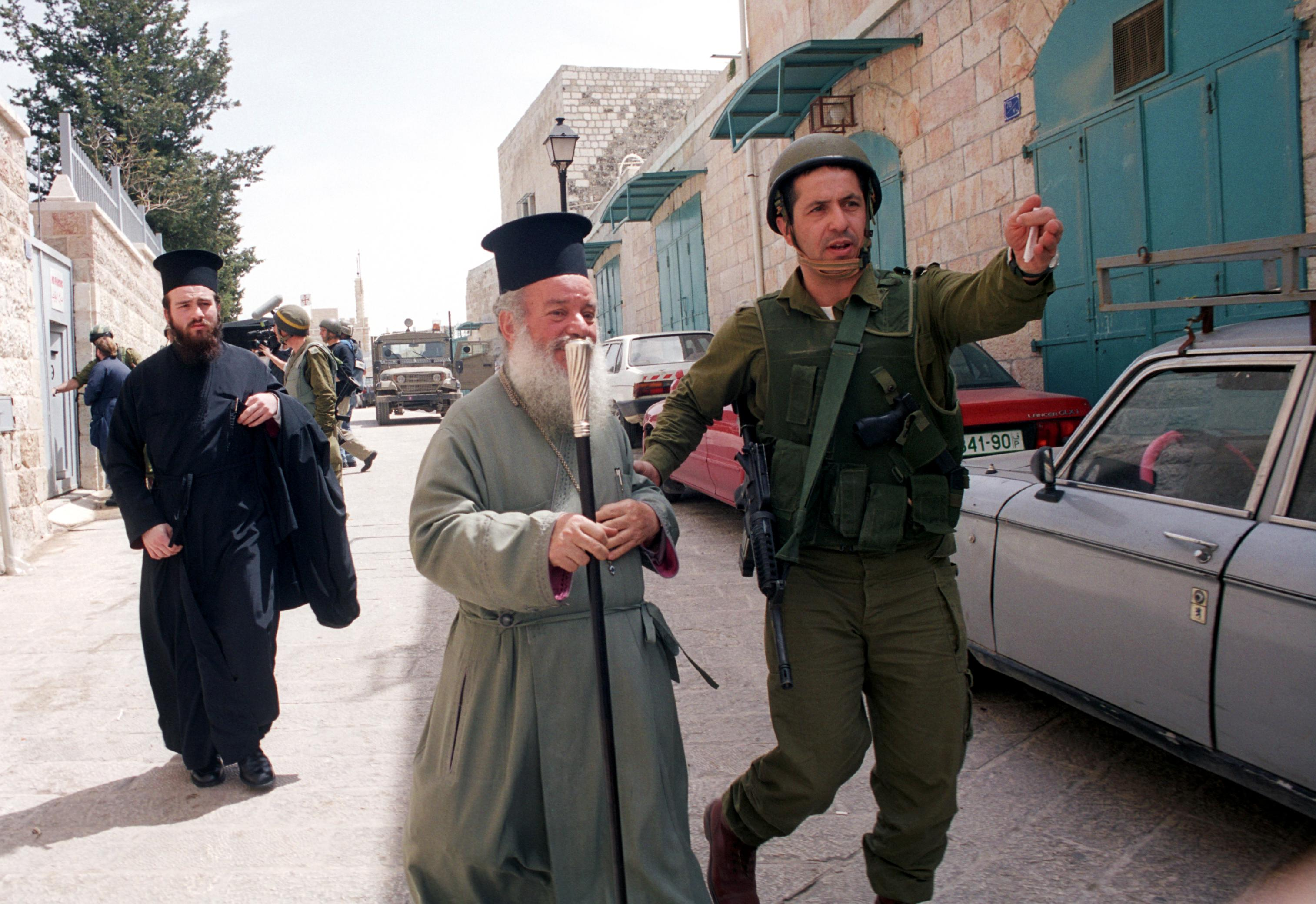
Israeli soldiers evacuating priests during the siege

On 3 April, the IDF deployed tanks near Manger Square, opposite the church, and Israeli Army snipers took up positions on the surrounding buildings. They were instructed to fire at anyone spotted inside the church, searching out targets with laser beams. The Israeli government said it regarded the militants' use of holy sites as cynical and claimed that the militants had shot at the Israeli troops from the church. IDF spokesman, Brigadier General Ron Kitri, said: "It is complicated because it is a sacred place and we do not want to use live ammunition. There are several channels of negotiation to try to achieve as close to a peaceful solution as possible". Michel Sabbah, the Latin Patriarch of Jerusalem and the head of the Catholic Church in the region, said the gunmen had been given sanctuary, and that "the basilica is a place of refuge for everybody, even fighters, as long as they lay down their arms. We have an obligation to give refuge to Palestinians and Israelis alike". The IDF placed its headquarters in a Palestinian convention center named the "Peace Center".

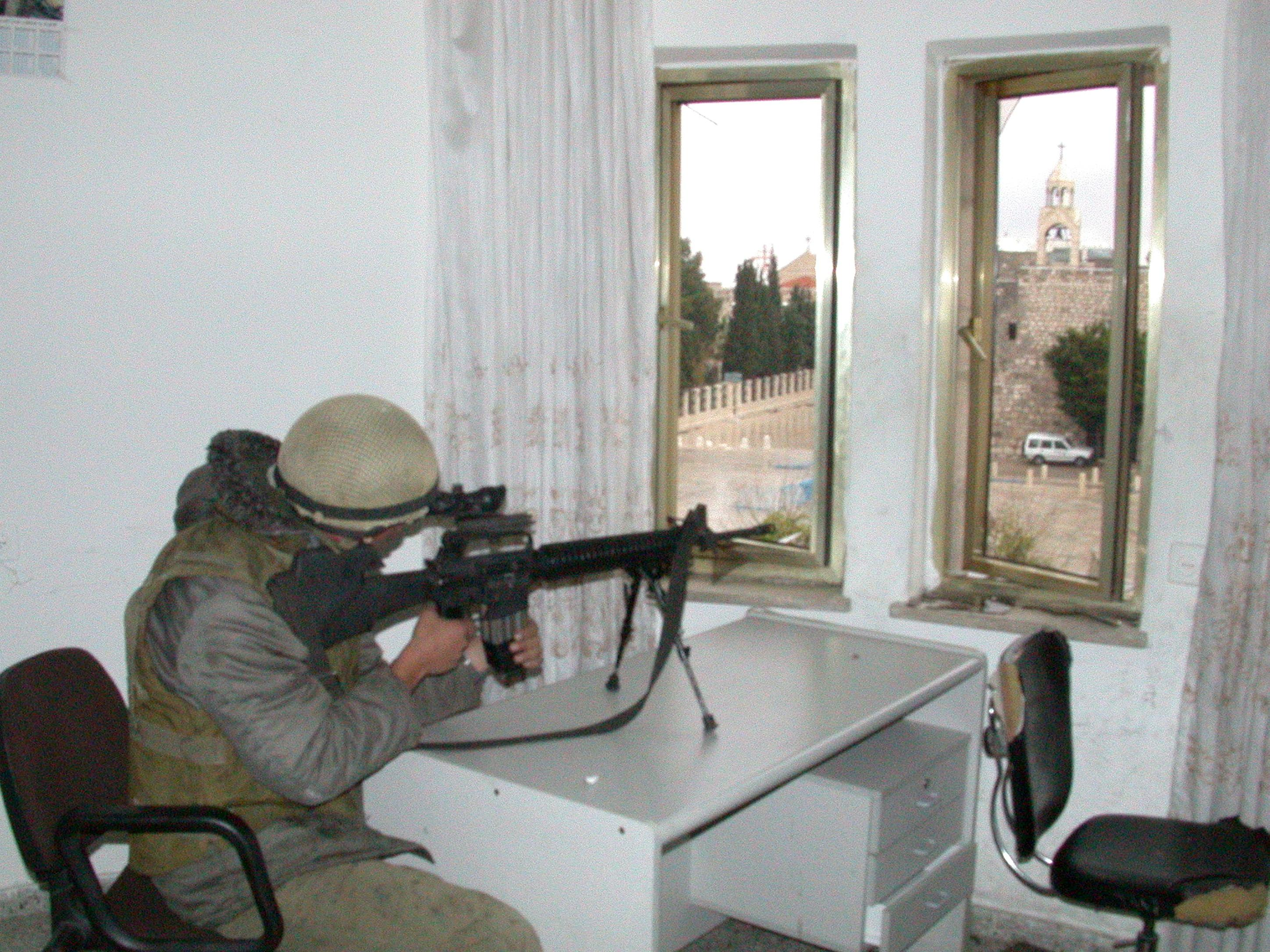
Israeli sniper during the siege, April 3, 2002

The militants were divided into six groups, based on affiliation. They kept contact with the outside world using cellphones. They slept on the church floor and in the monks' rooms. The restrooms broke several times due to the disrupted water supply. Throughout the siege, Israeli Army snipers killed seven fighters inside the church from their rooftop position. According to a witness, they used green laser beams to find targets during the night.

On 4 April, Samir Ibrahim Salman the bellringer of the Church was shot several times in the chest by an Israeli sniper and died. On 5 April 4 Franciscan monks left the church under Israeli escort. Israeli sources said they were told the clergy had been taken hostage, while sources in the Franciscan order maintained they were "voluntary hostages" intent on remaining in order to express solidarity with the Palestinians and to prevent bloodshed.

On 7 April, Vatican City warned Israel to respect religious sites in line with its international obligations. Spokesman Joaquin Navarro-Valls said that the Vatican was following events "with extreme apprehension". A spokesman for Catholic monks in the Holy Land accused the Israelis of "indescribable act of barbarity". The Vatican's top foreign policy expert Archbishop Jean-Louis Taura stated that while the Palestinians have joined the Vatican in bilateral agreements where they have undertaken to respect and maintain the status quo regarding Christian holy places and the rights of Christian communities, "to explain the gravity of the current situation, let me begin with the fact that the occupation of the holy places by armed men is a violation of a long tradition of law that dates back to the Ottoman era. Never before have they been occupied – for such a lengthy time – by armed men." Pope John Paul II urged people to pray for peace in the Middle East and described the violence as having reached "unimaginable and intolerable" levels. Israeli Prime Minister, Ariel Sharon, said the Israeli soldiers would not "defile the holiness of the site as the [Palestinians] have". He also said that the troops would remain in place until the militants inside were captured. British Foreign Office Minister, Ben Bradshaw described Israeli actions in the area as "totally unacceptable".

On 8 April, a major gunbattle broke out, damaging the facade of the church and causing a fire. Both sides claimed the shooting had begun from the other side. The IDF claimed that the Palestinians had opened fire from a bell tower, wounding two Israel Border Police gendarmes in a nearby rooftop look-out. An IDF officer said the Israeli troops returned fire, and threw a smoke grenade, which started a blaze in a second-floor meeting hall overlooking the Basilica of St Catherine, adjacent to the Church of the Nativity. One Palestinian militant was killed.

On 10 April, an Armenian monk was also wounded, having been shot, according to an Israeli spokesman, because he wore civilian clothes and seemed to be armed.

On 11 April, the head of the Franciscan order, Giacomo Bini formally requested that the Palestinians be allowed to leave the church with a guarantee that their lives be protected, and that water and power be restored to the Church while the spokesman for the order reminded Israeli Jews of the role the Franciscan order had played in protecting Jews from the Holocaust by offering them sanctuary during WW2. The Vatican news agency Fides reported that these appeals were dismissed by the Israeli Government with the words: "Stop bothering us".

On 14 April, Ariel Sharon gave the Palestinians the option of facing trial in Israel or permanent exile, a proposal they refused. Another Palestinian was shot dead.

16 April saw the fiercest exchange of fire near the building since the beginning of the siege. One Palestinian was wounded in the stomach and another suffered from epilepsy. They were evacuated to a hospital. Two Japanese tourists wandered into the church perimeters by mistake, and were rescued by journalists. One sixteen-year-old Palestinian, Jihad Abu-Qamil, ran away from the church and gave himself up to the IDF.

On 17 April, Israeli soldiers shot and wounded a Palestinian after he had left the church, and a priest who had fallen ill was evacuated.

On 20 April, the Greek Orthodox Church of Jerusalem called upon Christians worldwide to make the upcoming Sunday a "solidarity day" for the people in the church and the church itself, and called for immediate intervention to stop what it referred to as the "inhuman measures against the people and the stone of the church". It also asked Christians, Muslims and Jews to gather at the main entrance to Bethlehem and march to the church.

On 23 April, negotiations to end the siege began in the Peace Center. The negotiations were mediated by the Archbishop of Canterbury's representative in Bethlehem, Canon Andrew White. The Israeli negotiator was IDF Colonel Lior Lotan, a lawyer by profession. At first, Yasser Arafat appointed Salah Tamari to head the negotiation team. Tamari rejected Israel's demands to hand over a list of the besieged militants, but then found out that Arafat had given Daoud a contradicting order. Arafat also appointed another negotiation team, headed by Mohammad Rashid.

After two days of negotiations, the Palestinians were willing to discuss a possible deportation of the militants in the church to what a senior official called a "friendly foreign country". Then an exchange of fire took place. Two Palestinians were wounded, and four surrendered to the IDF. On 30 April, Israeli officials said that at least thirty people would soon exit the church. Israel said it wanted to try them within Israel, or alternatively exile them. The Palestinians demanded that those men be moved to the Gaza Strip and others passed under Palestinian Authority control for trial.

On 1 May, twenty-six people came out of the church. IDF spokesman Olivier Rafowicz said one of them was a senior Palestinian security official. He was taken away for questioning. On 2 May, ten international activists, including members of the International Solidarity Movement, were successful in their attempts to bypass soldiers and enter the church, where they announced they intended to remain until the IDF lifted the siege. The next day, another group of international activists delivered food and water, which were in short supply among those inside. On 5 May, British and American diplomats arrived. It was suggested that about ten of the militants would be exiled to Jordan. Meanwhile, the IDF said it had found a large amount of explosives in an apartment about 200 meters from the church. Between six and eight of the militants were to be exiled to Italy, while as many as forty others were to be sent to Gaza. The remaining were to be freed. The agreement fell through on 8 May, after Italy refused to accept thirteen militants. The Italian government said it had received no formal request to take them.

On 9 May it was agreed that twenty-six men militants were to go to the Gaza Strip, eighty-five civilians were to be checked by the IDF and then released and the thirteen most wanted, including Daoud, would remain in the church, monitored by a European Union official, until they could be transferred to British Army custody and moved to Italy and Spain, after those countries agreed in principle to accept them. Al-Madani was the first to walk out of the church.

== Aftermath ==
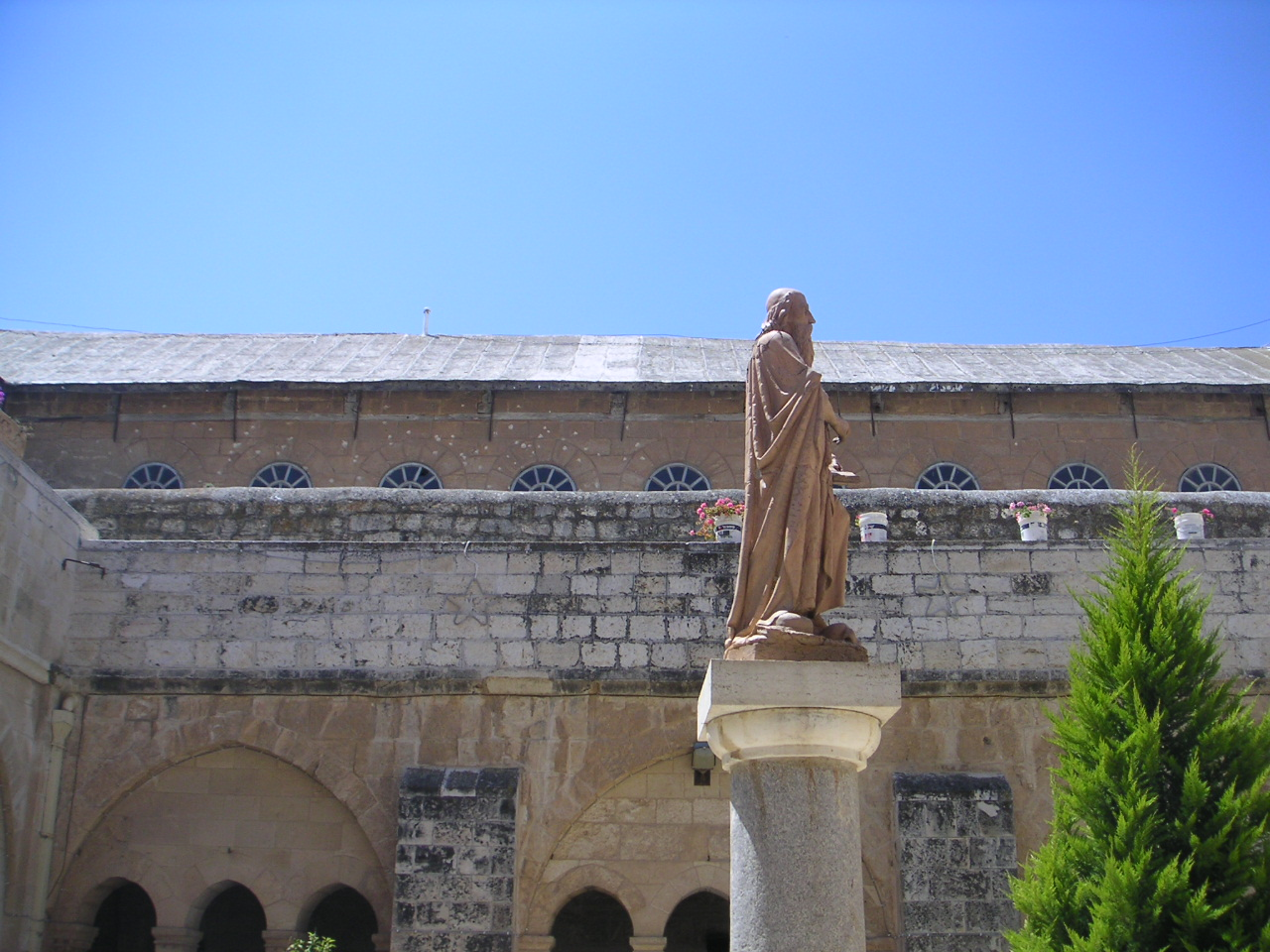
Catholic section of the Church of Nativity with marks of Israeli bullets in the upper left corner

On 10 May, the thirteen men left the church, and were taken to Ben Gurion International Airport in an armored bus, where a Royal Air Force transport plane awaited to take them to Cyprus. They were greeted by Sherard Cowper-Coles, the British Ambassador to Israel, thirty members of the Royal Military Police, and a Royal Air Force doctor. They laid down their arms to the IDF behind a curtain, to avoid the photographers. They were denied permission to meet with their families before their exile.

A total of 8 Palestinians had been killed, and an Armenian monk was also wounded. Israeli riot police reported finding 40 explosive devices which had been left in the church by the Palestinians, several of them booby-trapped.

As for damage to the cultural heritage site, ICOMOS estimated the damage at a total of US$1.4 million, primarily grades 3 and 4, and loss in urban furniture. Direct damage to the church complex from projectiles and fire was estimated to total about US$77,000.

== See also ==
- Captive, documentary series in which the siege was featured.

== Bibliography ==
- Harel, Amos; Avi Isacharoff (2004). The Seventh War (in Hebrew). Tel-Aviv: Yedioth Aharonoth Books and Chemed Books. ISBN 978-965-511-767-7.
- Sandercock, Josie (2004). Peace under fire: Israel/Palestine and the International Solidarity Movement (Illustrated ed.). Verso. ISBN 978-1-84467-501-2.

=== Further reading ===
- Hammer, Joshua (8 September 2003). A Season in Bethlehem : Unholy War in a Sacred Place. Free Press. p. 288. ISBN 978-0-7432-4413-8.
