= Manger Square =

City square in Bethlehem, Palestine

Coordinates: 31°42′16″N 35°12′23″E

- Public square
- ميدان المهد
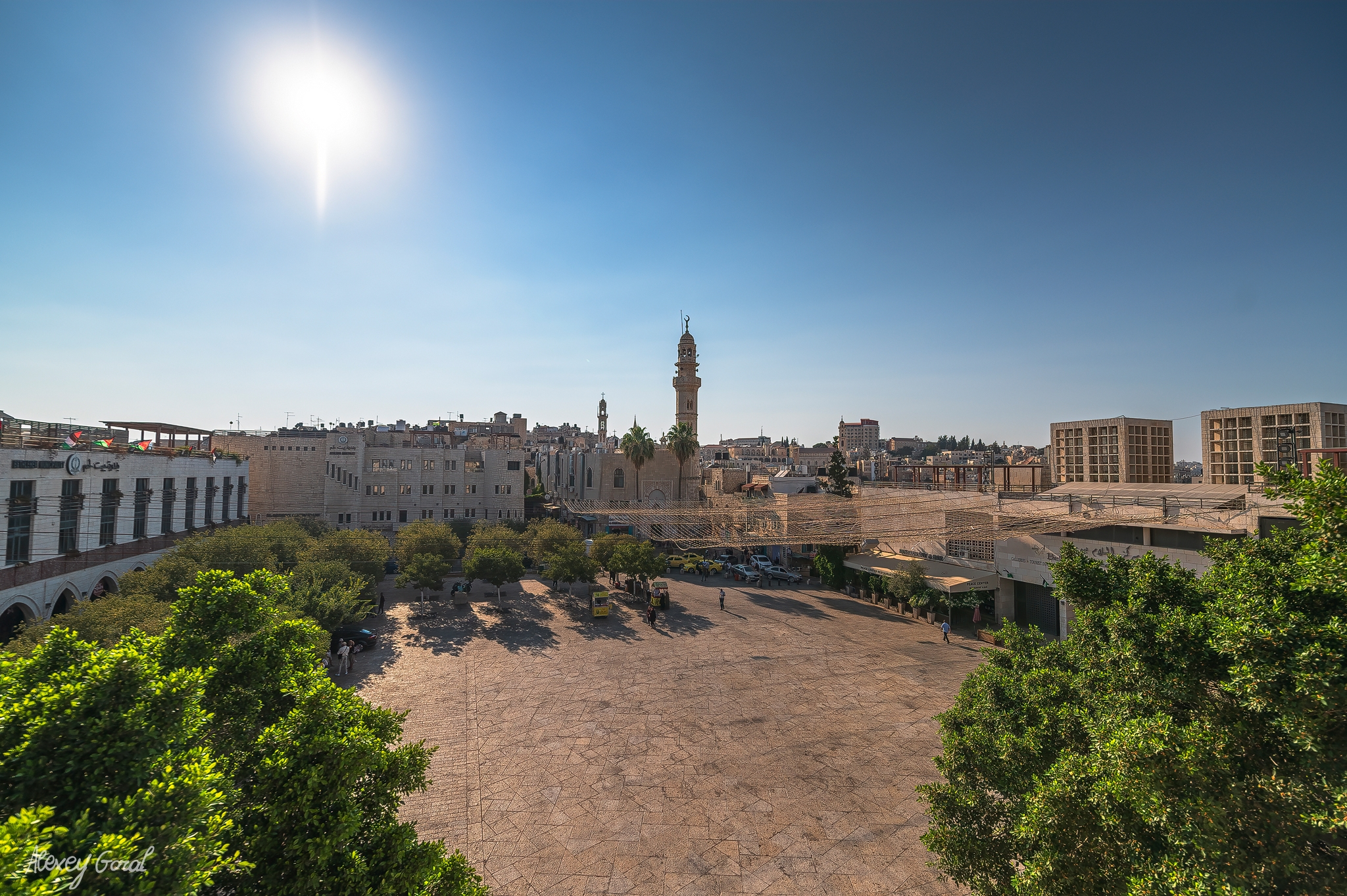
- Manger Square, in Central Bethlehem
- Location: Bethlehem, Palestine
- Interactive map of Manger Square

Manger Square (Arabic: ميدان المهد, romanized: Maydān al-mahd; Hebrew: כיכר האבוס) is a city square in the center of Bethlehem in Palestine. It takes its name from the manger where Jesus is said to have been born which, according to Christian tradition, took place at the Grotto of the Nativity, enshrined since the fourth century in the Church of the Nativity. A particular building set in Manger Square is the Mosque of Omar, the Old City's only mosque, and the Palestinian Peace Center. The streets that lead to the square are related to the Christian faith, such as Star Street and Nativity Street.

In 1998–1999, the square was renovated to relieve the traffic congestion and currently is, to a large degree, pedestrian only. It is mainly a meeting place for locals and for the town's many pilgrims. There are rows of celtis australis trees that provide shade to its people, with benches and fountains made of yellowish-white local limestone known as Naqab marble.

== Christmas celebrations ==
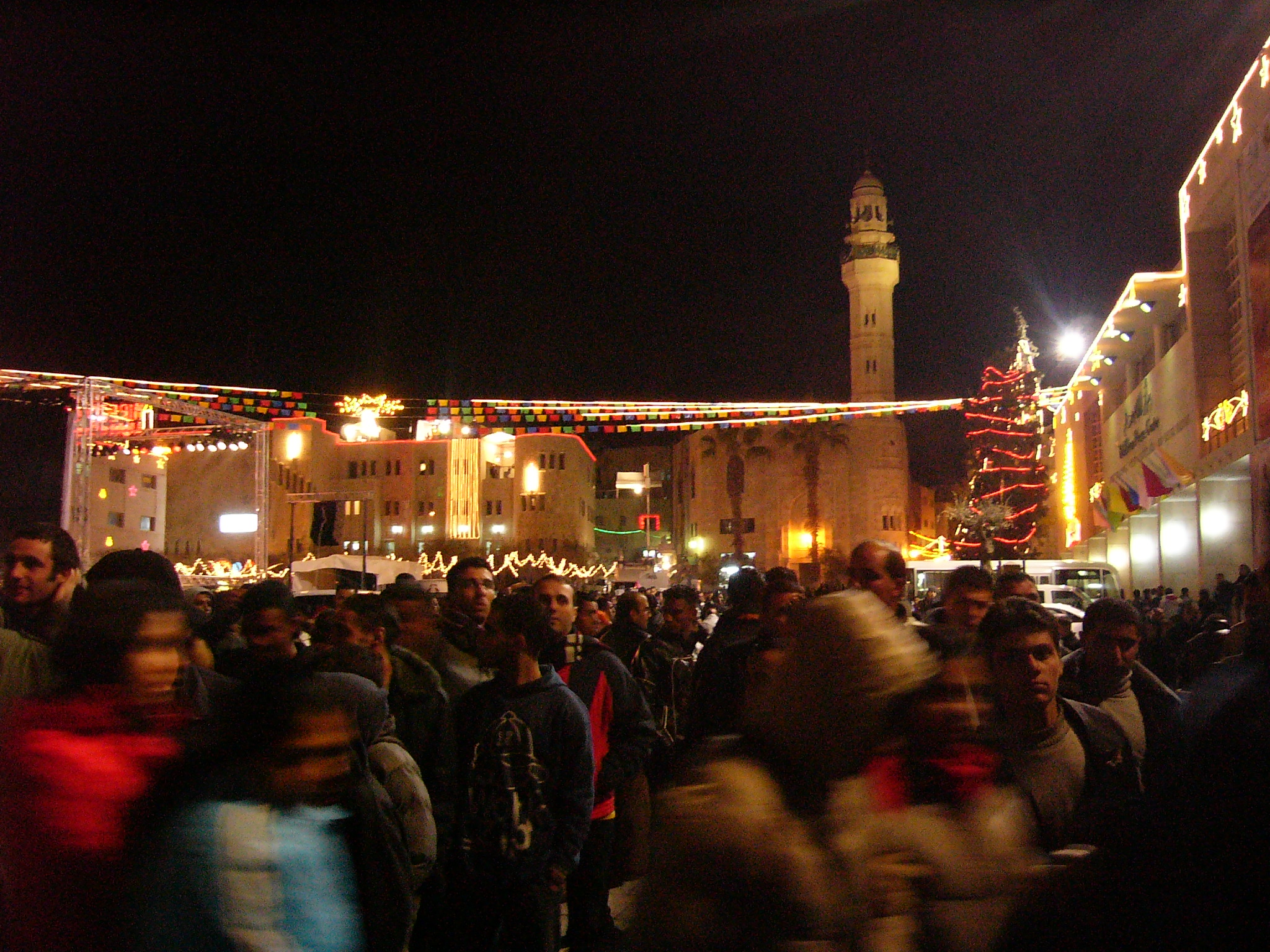
Christmas Eve 2006 at Manger Square.

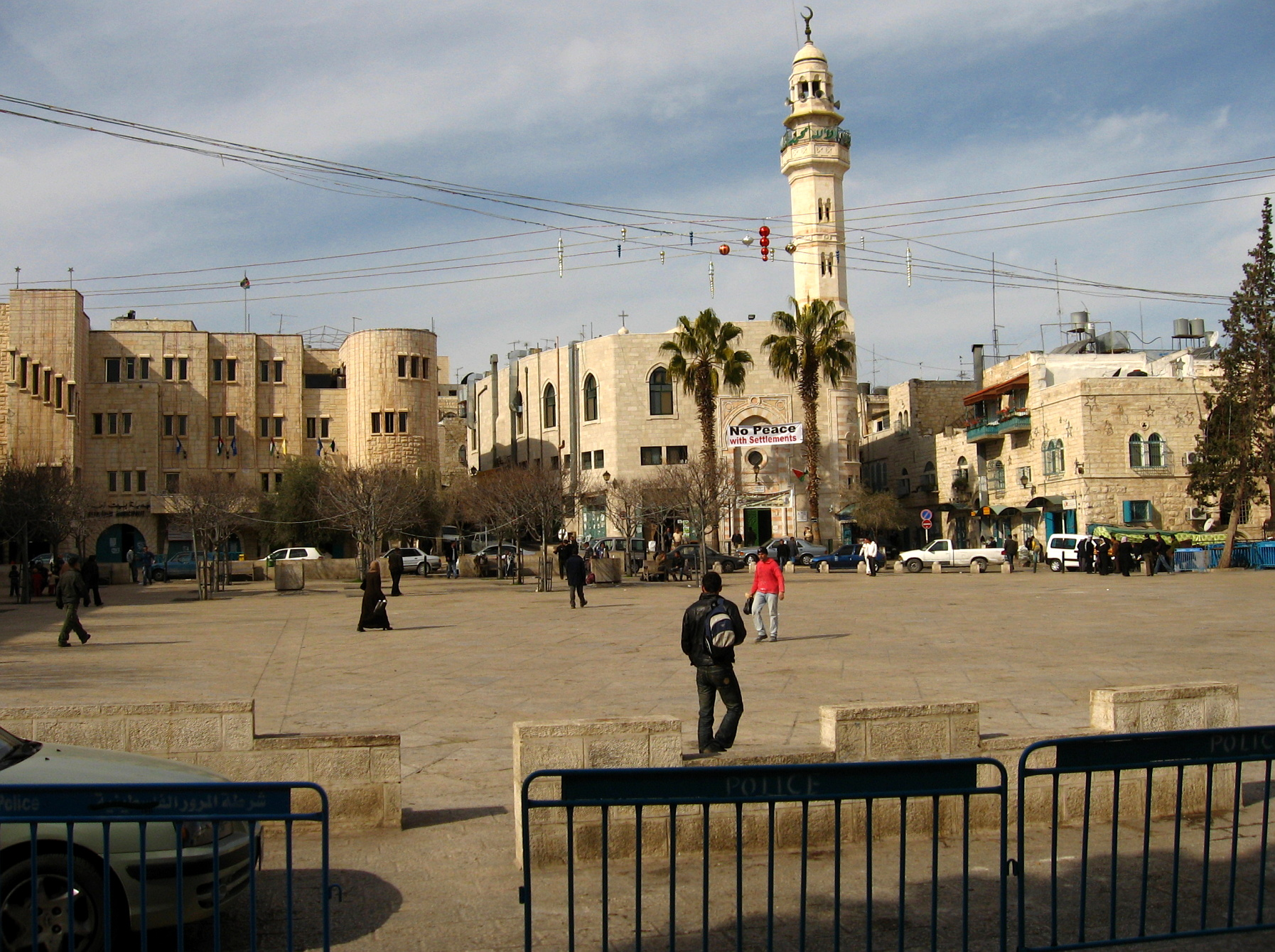
Manger Square and Mosque of Omar.

Manger Square is a focal point for all of the Christmas celebrations in Bethlehem, with a giant Christmas tree crowning the square. It is the traditional spot where locals and pilgrims sing Christmas carols before the midnight mass at the Church of the Nativity. The Greek Orthodox Patriarchate of Jerusalem and the Armenian Apostolic Church follow the Julian Calendar liturgically, whereas the Roman Catholic Church follows the modern Gregorian Calendar. Thus Christmas Eve services for the Eastern and Western confessions are held on different days. The Roman Catholic Church celebrates the Nativity on 25 December; the Orthodox celebrations are on 7 January.

== Venue for sports and cultural activities ==
On 21 April 2013, Manger Square was the starting and finishing line of Palestine Marathon.

== Church of the Nativity siege ==
In May 2002, during an Israel Defense Forces raid on the square a part of Operation Defensive Shield, a number of locals (some of whom were armed) and peace activists took refuge in the Church of the Nativity. It became the site of a five-week stand-off. The number of people inside was estimated between 120 and 240. It was alleged by Palestinians that several Palestinians inside the church compound were shot dead by Israeli snipers during the siege. The siege ended with an agreement for 13 militants to be sent via Cyprus to various European countries and another 26 to be sent to Gaza. The rest were set free. The IDF stated that 40 explosive devices were found and removed from the compound after the standoff was concluded.
