= Church of the Nativity =

Basilica in Bethlehem, Palestine

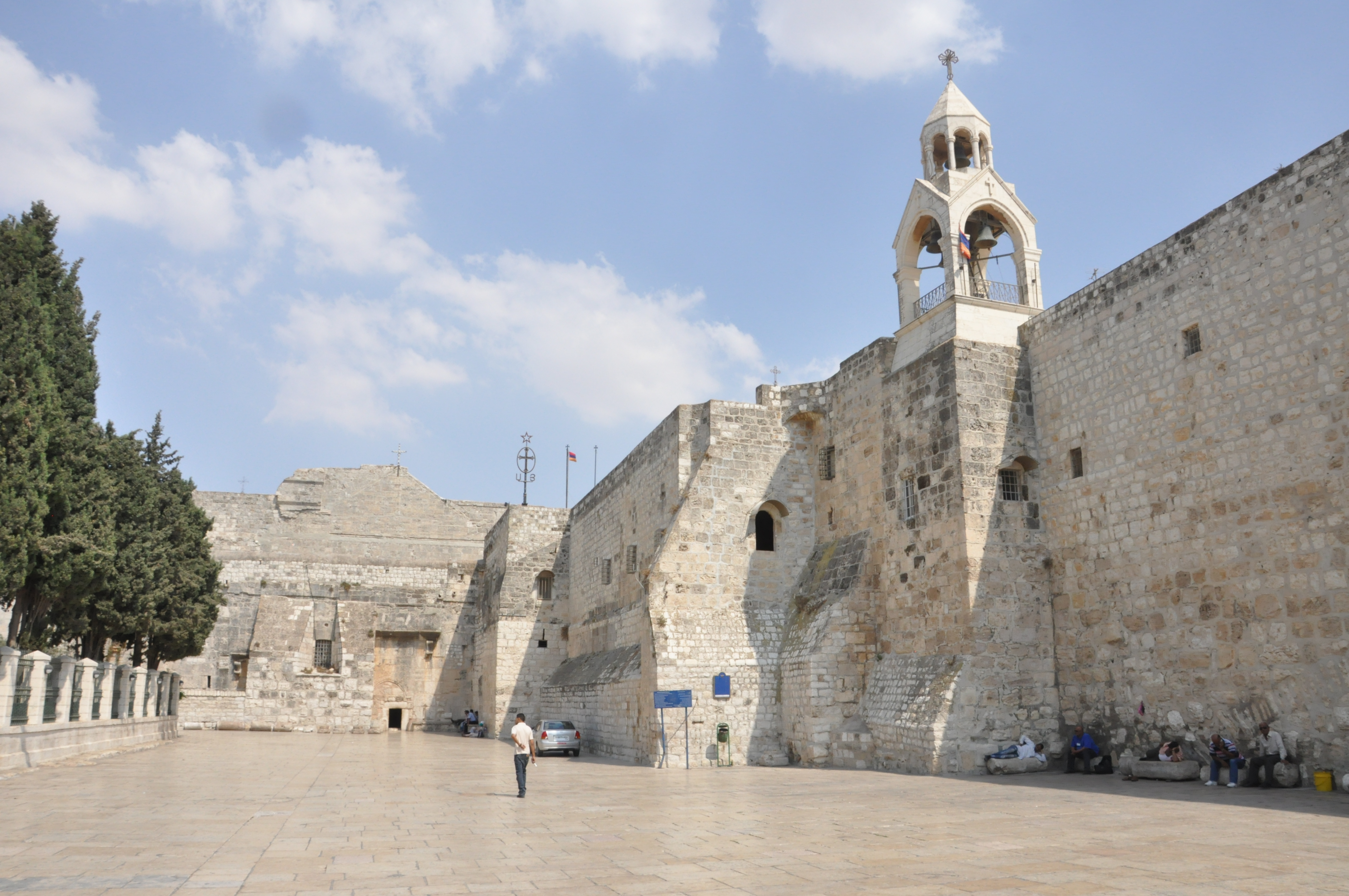
- Facade of the Church of the Nativity (left) and Armenian monastery (right), 2012

Religion
- Affiliation: Shared: Catholic, Armenian Apostolic, and Greek Orthodox Church, with minor Coptic Orthodox, Ethiopian Tewahedo Orthodox, and Syriac Orthodox rites
- Status: Active

Location
- Location: Bethlehem, West Bank, Palestine
- Interactive map of Church of the Nativity
- Coordinates: 31°42′15.5″N 35°12′27.3″E

Architecture
- Type: Byzantine (Constantine the Great and Justinian I)
- Style: Romanesque
- Groundbreaking: 326
- Completed: c. 565
- UNESCO World Heritage Site
- Official name: Birthplace of Jesus: the Church of the Nativity and the Pilgrimage Route, Bethlehem
- Type: Cultural Heritage
- Criteria: iv, vi
- Designated: 2012
- Reference no.: 1433
- State Party: Palestine
- Region: Western Asia

Website
- custodia.org/en/sanctuaries/bethlehem

The Church of the Nativity, or Basilica of the Nativity, (Note: Hebrew: כנסיית המולד; Arabic: كَنِيسَةُ ٱلْمَهْد, romanized: kanīsatu l-mahd; Greek: Βασιλική της Γεννήσεως; Armenian: Սուրբ Ծննդեան տաճար; Latin: Basilica Nativitatis) is a basilica located in Bethlehem, West Bank, Palestine. The grotto holds a prominent religious significance to Christians of various denominations as the birthplace of Jesus. The grotto is the oldest site continuously used as a place of worship in Christianity, and the basilica is the oldest major church in the Holy Land.

The church was originally commissioned by Constantine the Great a short time after his mother Helena's visit to Jerusalem and Bethlehem in 325–326, on the site that was traditionally considered to be the birthplace of Jesus. That original basilica was likely built between 330 and 333, being already mentioned in 333, and was dedicated on 31 May 339. It was probably destroyed by fire during the Samaritan revolts of the sixth century, possibly in 529, and a new basilica was built a number of years later by Byzantine Emperor Justinian (r. 527–565), who added a porch or narthex, and replaced the octagonal sanctuary with a cruciform transept complete with three apses, but largely preserved the original character of the building, with an atrium and a basilica consisting of a nave with four side aisles.

The Church of the Nativity, while remaining basically unchanged since the Justinianic reconstruction, has seen numerous repairs and additions, especially from the Crusader period, such as two bell towers (now gone), wall mosaics and paintings (partially preserved). Over the centuries, the surrounding compound has been expanded, and today it covers approximately 12,000 square meters, comprising three different monasteries: one Catholic, one Armenian Apostolic, and one Greek Orthodox, of which the first two contain bell towers built during the modern era.

The silver star marking the spot where Christ was born, inscribed in Latin, was stolen in October 1847 by Greek monks who wished to remove this Catholic item. Some assert that this was a contributing factor in the Crimean War against the Russian Empire. Others assert that the war grew out of the wider European situation.

Since 2012, the Church of the Nativity is a World Heritage Site and was the first to be listed by UNESCO under 'Palestine'.

Since 1852, the rights of the three religious communities have been governed by an understanding known as the Status Quo. Initially informal, this was made official by the Treaty of Paris in 1856, and was codified by the United Nations in the Palestine Conciliation Commission in 1949.

== Base in scripture ==
Of the four canonical gospels, Matthew and Luke mention the birth of Jesus, both placing it in Bethlehem. Luke mentions the manger: "and she gave birth to her son. She wrapped him in cloths and placed him in a manger, because there was no guest room available for them."

A variant of the narrative is contained in the Gospel of James, an apocryphal infancy gospel.

== History ==
=== Holy site before Constantine (ca. 4 BC–AD 326) ===
The holy site known as the Nativity Grotto is thought to be the manger where Jesus was born. In 135, Emperor Hadrian had the site above the grotto converted into a worship place for Adonis, the mortal lover of Aphrodite, the Greek goddess of beauty and desire. Jerome claimed in 420 that the grotto had been consecrated to the worship of Adonis, and that a sacred grove was planted there in order to completely wipe out the sect.

Around AD 248, Greek philosopher Origen of Alexandria wrote the following about the grotto:

In Bethlehem the cave is pointed out where He was born, and the manger in the cave where He was wrapped in swaddling clothes. And the rumor is in those places, and among foreigners of the Faith, that indeed Jesus was born in this cave who is worshiped and reverenced by the Christians.

=== Constantinian basilica (326 – 529 or 556) ===
The first basilica on this site was built by Emperor Constantine I, on the site identified by his mother, Empress Helena and Bishop Makarios of Jerusalem. The construction started in 326 under the supervision of Makarios, who followed Constantine's orders, and was dedicated on 31 May 339—however, it had already been visited in 333 by the Bordeaux Pilgrim, at which time it was already in use.

Construction of this early church was carried out as part of a larger project following the First Council of Nicaea during Constantine's reign, aimed to build churches on the sites assumed at the time to have witnessed the crucial events in the life of Jesus. The design of the basilica centered around three major architectural sections:

1. At the eastern end, an apse in a polygonal shape (broken pentagon, rather than the once proposed, but improbable full octagon), encircling a raised platform with an opening in its floor of ca. 4 metres diameter that allowed direct view of the Nativity site underneath. An ambulatory with side rooms surrounded the apse.
2. A five-aisled basilica in continuation of the eastern apse, one bay shorter than the still standing Justinianic reconstruction.
3. A porticoed atrium.

The structure was burned and destroyed in one of the Samaritan Revolts of 529 or 556, in the second of which Jews seem to have joined the Samaritans.

=== Justinian's basilica (6th century) ===
The basilica was rebuilt in its present form in the 6th century on the initiative of Byzantine Emperor Justinian I (527–565), after the destruction of either 529 or 556. It was probably accomplished after the Emperor's death, as is indicated by the dating of the wooden elements embedded in the church walls between 545 and 665, which was provided by the dendrochronological analyses made during the recent restoration works.

The Persians under Khosrau II invaded Palestine and conquered nearby Jerusalem in 614, but they did not destroy the structure. According to legend, their commander Shahrbaraz was moved by the depiction above the church entrance of the Three Magi wearing the garb of Persian Zoroastrian priests, so he ordered that the building be spared.

=== Crusader period (1099–1187) ===
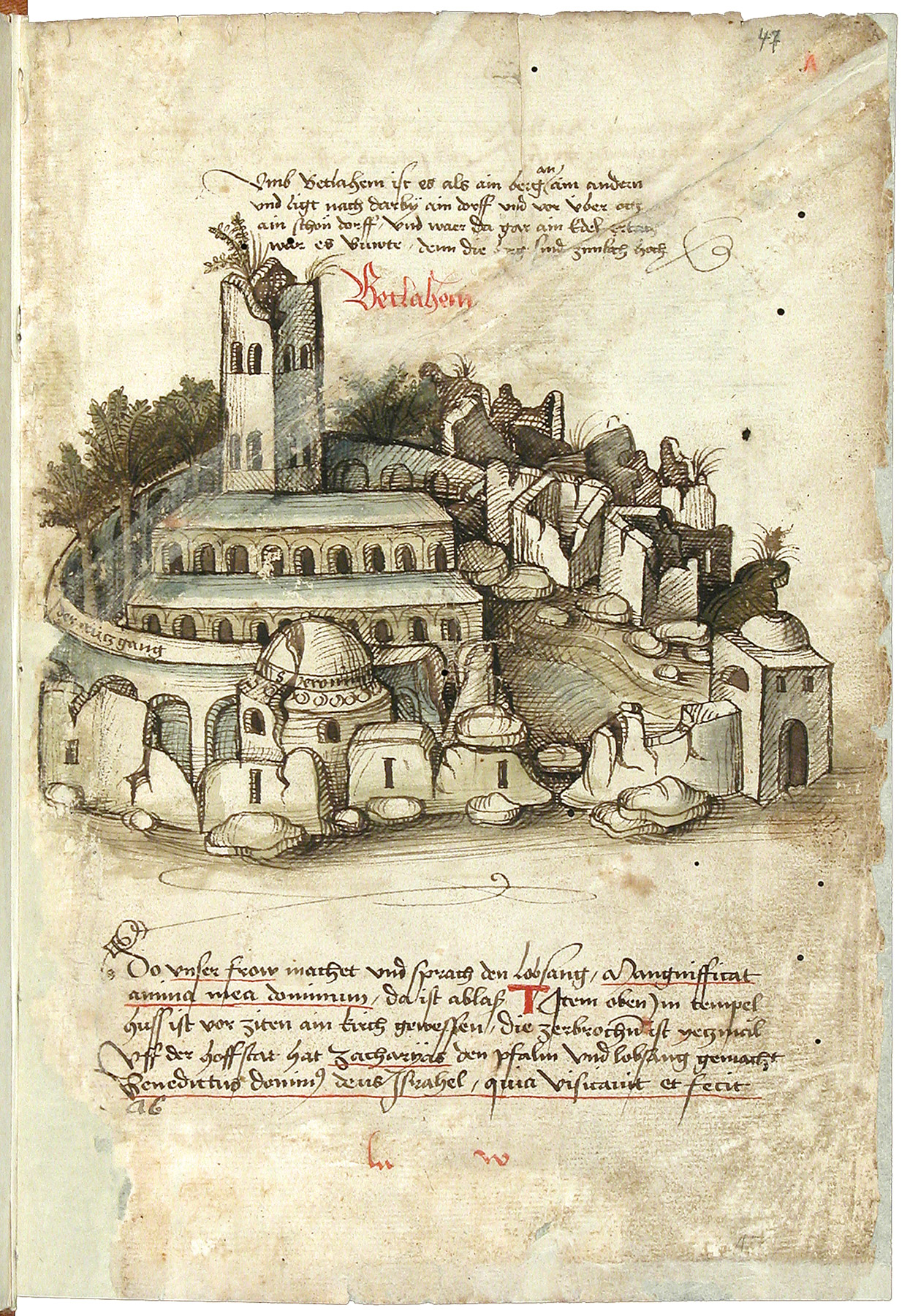
The basilica and grounds as they were depicted in a work published in 1487

The First Crusade captured Jerusalem in 1099. The Latin conquerors promoted the redecoration of the building in the medium of wall painting: images of saints were displayed in the central and southern colonnades of the nave, largely on the initiative of private donors, as is shown by the frequent use of dedicatory inscriptions and portraits. Remnants of a cycle of narrative scenes are preserved in the north-western pillar of the choir and the south transepts, as well as in the chapel located below the bell tower.

From 1131 until the end of the Latin rule over Jerusalem, the Holy Sepulchre was the site of royal coronations and burials. The Latins undertook extensive decoration and restoration on the basilica and grounds, a process that continued until 1169, from 1165 to 1169 even through a sort of "joint venture" between Bishop Ralph and King Amalric and the Byzantine emperor Manuel I Komnenos. As detailed in the bilingual Greek and Latin inscription in the altar space, the mosaic decoration was made by a team headed by a painter named Ephraim. Another bilingual, Latin and Syriac, inscription located in the lower half of a mosaic panel displaying an angel in the northern wall of the nave bears witness to the work of a painter named Basil, who was probably a local Syrian Melkite. The two artists collaborated within the same workshop.

=== Ayyubid and Mamluk periods (1187–1516) ===
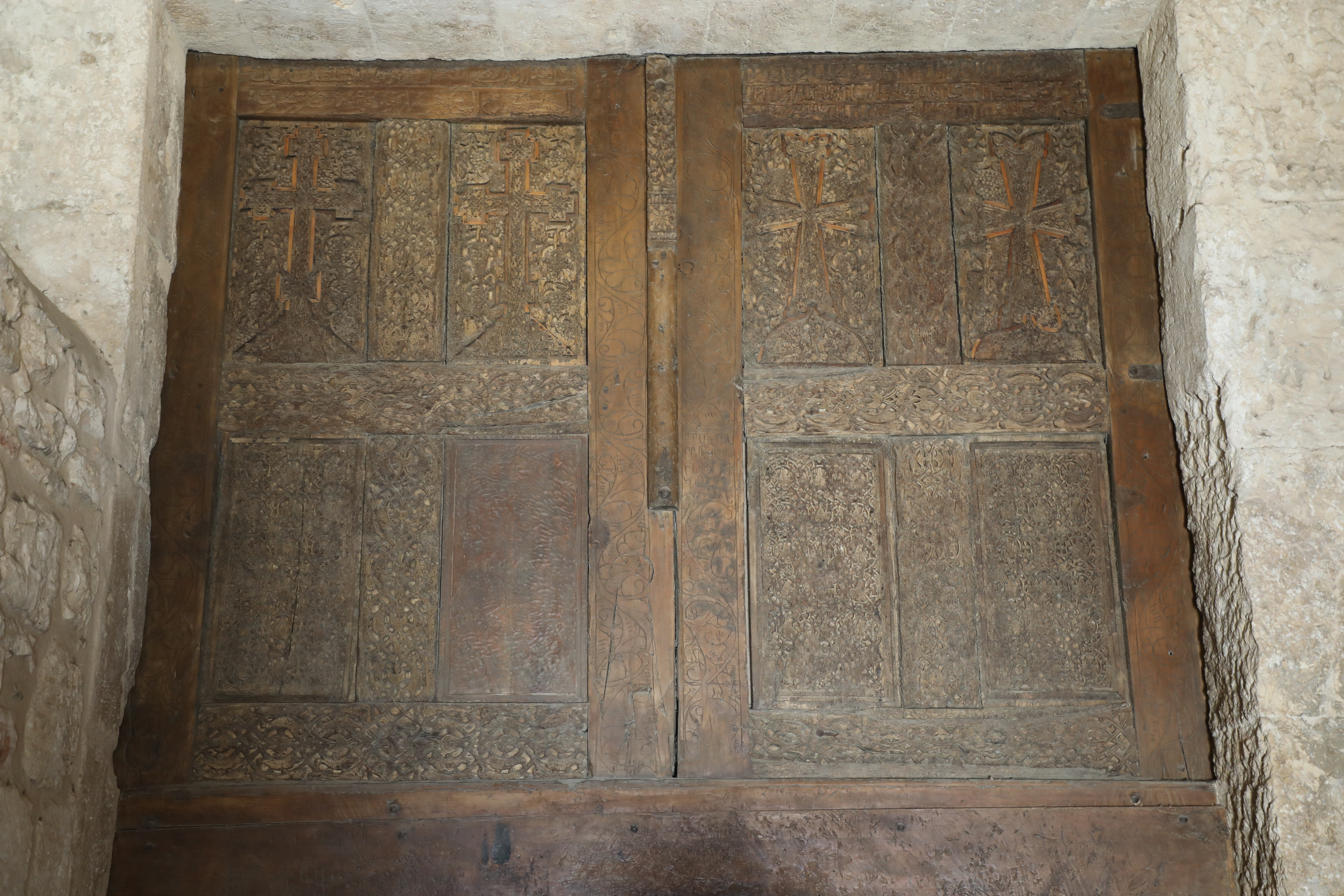
The wooden Armenian door in the narthex of the Nativity Church, 1227

The Ayyubid conquest of Jerusalem and its area in 1187 was without consequences for the Nativity church. The Greek-Melkite clergy was granted the right to serve in the church, and similar concessions were given almost immediately also to other Christian denominations.

In 1227 the church was embellished with an elegantly carved wooden door, the remnants of which can still be seen in the narthex. As detailed in its double, Armenian and Arabic inscription, it was made by two Armenian monks, Father Abraham and Father Arakel, in the times of King Hethum I of Cilicia (1224–1269) and the Emir of Damascus, and Saladin's nephew, al-Mu'azzam Isa. In 1229 Holy Roman Emperor Frederick II signed an agreement with Sultan al-Kamil which led to the restitution of the Holy Places to the Crusaders. The property of the Nativity Church came back into the possession of the Latin clergy on the condition that Muslim pilgrims may be allowed to visit the holy cave. Latin hegemony probably lasted until the incursion of Khwarezmian Turks in April 1244. On that occasion, the church treasures, now preserved in the Terra Sancta Museum in Jerusalem, were concealed underground and rediscovered only in 1863. The church was devastated, but not destroyed, the major damage being the dilapidation of its roof.

Under Mamluk rule, the church was used by different Christian denominations, including Greeks, Armenians, Copts, Ethiopians, and Syrians. In 1347 the Franciscans of the newly established Custody of the Holy Land were bestowed with the ownership of the former monastery of the regular canons to the north of the basilica. The Friars managed to gain a hegemonic role in Bethlehem until the Ottoman period.

Starting from the late 13th century, pilgrims lament the dilapidation of the church interior by order of Mamluk authorities: in particular, the marble revetments of the walls and floor were gradually removed, until they thoroughly disappeared.

The Duchy of Burgundy committed resources to restore the roof in August 1448, and multiple regions contributed supplies to have the church roof repaired in 1480: England supplied the lead, the Second Kingdom of Burgundy supplied the wood, and the Republic of Venice provided the labor.

=== Ottoman period, first three centuries (16th–18th) ===
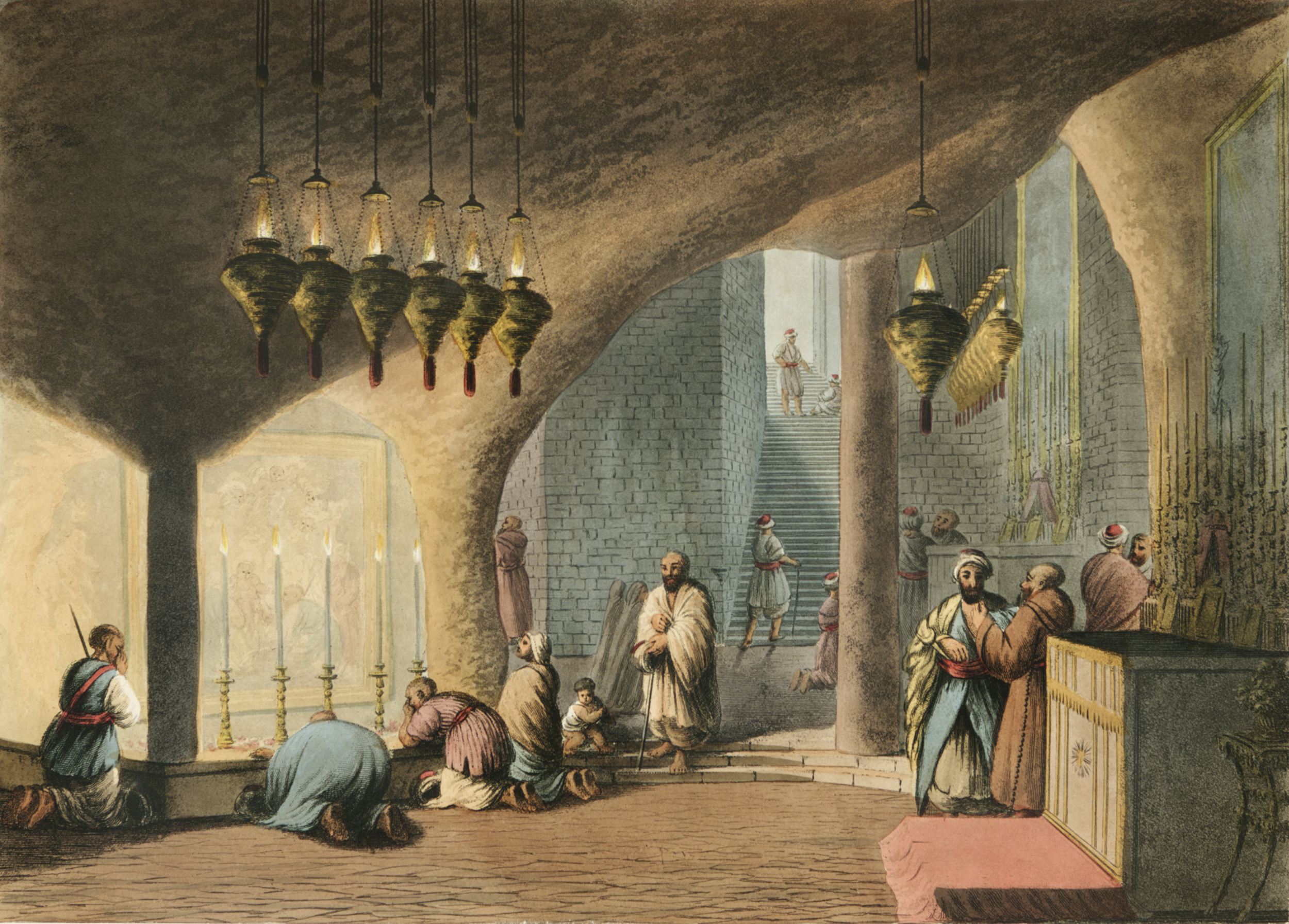
The Grotto of the Nativity, painted by Luigi Mayer, late 18th century

After the Ottoman conquest of Palestine in 1516, the Nativity church suffered from a long decay. The nave was largely abandoned and used for profane purposes. In the aim to prevent people from entering the church with horses and cattle, the main entrance was walled up and transformed into a diminutive door, known until our days as the "Door of Humility", since visitors are forced to bend down to go through it. An elevated chancel, provided with three doors, thoroughly separated the nave from the east end of the building, which was reserved for liturgical activities. The Ottoman period was characterized by increasing tensions between the different Christian denominations. In 1637, Greeks were granted hegemony by the Sublime Porte and the Franciscans were expelled from the holy cave. In 1621 the Armenian Patriarch Grigor Paronter bought the partly ruined buildings to the south of the courtyard and established there a monastery and a hospice for pilgrims. In 1639, the Cretan painter Jeremias Palladas was commissioned by the Greek Patriarch to paint new icons to embellish the church. Further works were made in 1671 on the initiative of Patriarch Dositheos II. In 1675, Dositheos managed to gain control also of the nave, and promoted restorations of the floor and the roof, as well as the making of a new iconostasis. The Franciscans were restored in their rights in 1690, but they lose their hegemony once again in 1757, when the Greek Orthodox were granted full ownership of the upper church and the authorization to keep the keys to the grotto. Afterwards, a redecoration of the church was promoted: the nave was newly paved, the bema was provided with a solemn iconostasis and a wooden baldachin was erected over the main altar.

Because of uninterrupted water infiltrations from the roof, the Crusader mosaics started falling down, as is documented in many pilgrims' accounts from the 16th century onwards.

=== Nineteenth century ===
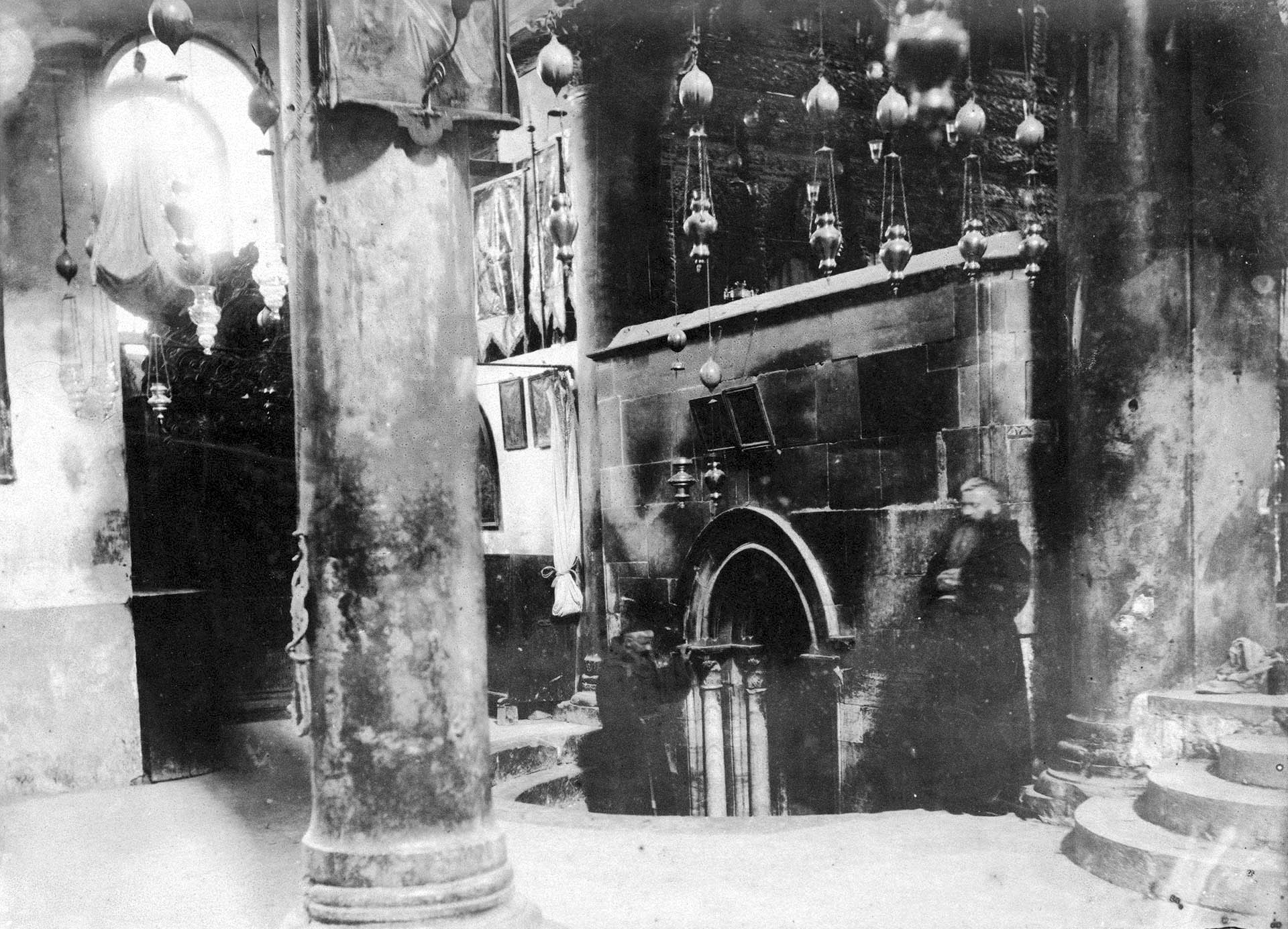
Northern steps to Grotto in the 1880s

Earthquakes inflicted significant damage to the Church of the Nativity between 1834 and 1837. The 1834 Jerusalem earthquake damaged the church's bell tower, the furnishings in the cave on which the church is built, and other parts of its structure. Minor damages were further inflicted by a series of strong aftershocks in 1836 and the Galilee earthquake of 1837. As part of the repairs executed by the Greek Orthodox after receiving a firman in 1842, a wall was built between the nave and aisles, used at the time as a market, and the eastern part of the church containing the choir, which allowed for worship to be continued there.

The religiously significant silver star marking the exact birthplace of Jesus was removed in October 1847 from the Grotto of the Nativity by the Greek Orthodox. The church was under the control of the Ottoman Empire, but around Christmas 1852, Napoleon III forced the Ottomans to recognise Catholic France as the "sovereign authority" over Christian holy sites in the Holy Land. The Sultan of Turkey replaced the silver star at the grotto, complete with a Latin inscription, but the Christian Orthodox Russian Empire disputed the change in authority. They cited the Treaty of Küçük Kaynarca and then deployed armies to the Danube area. As a result, the Ottomans issued firmans essentially reversing their earlier decision, renouncing the French treaty, and restoring to the Orthodox Christians the sovereign authority over the churches of the Holy Land for the time being, thus increasing local tensions—and all this fuelled the conflict between the Russian and the Ottoman empires over the control of holy sites around the region.

=== Twentieth century to the present ===
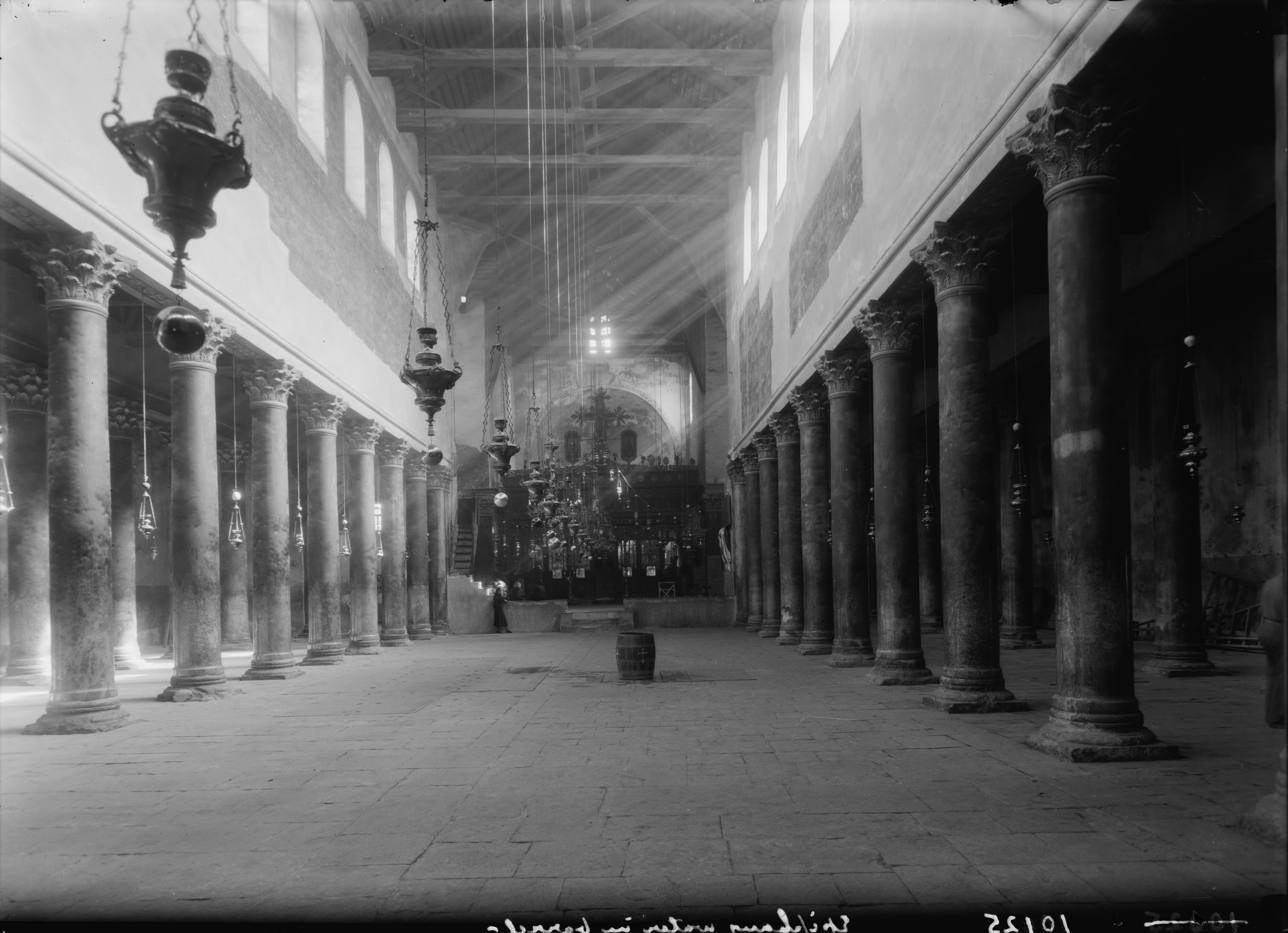
Interior of the basilica in the 1930s

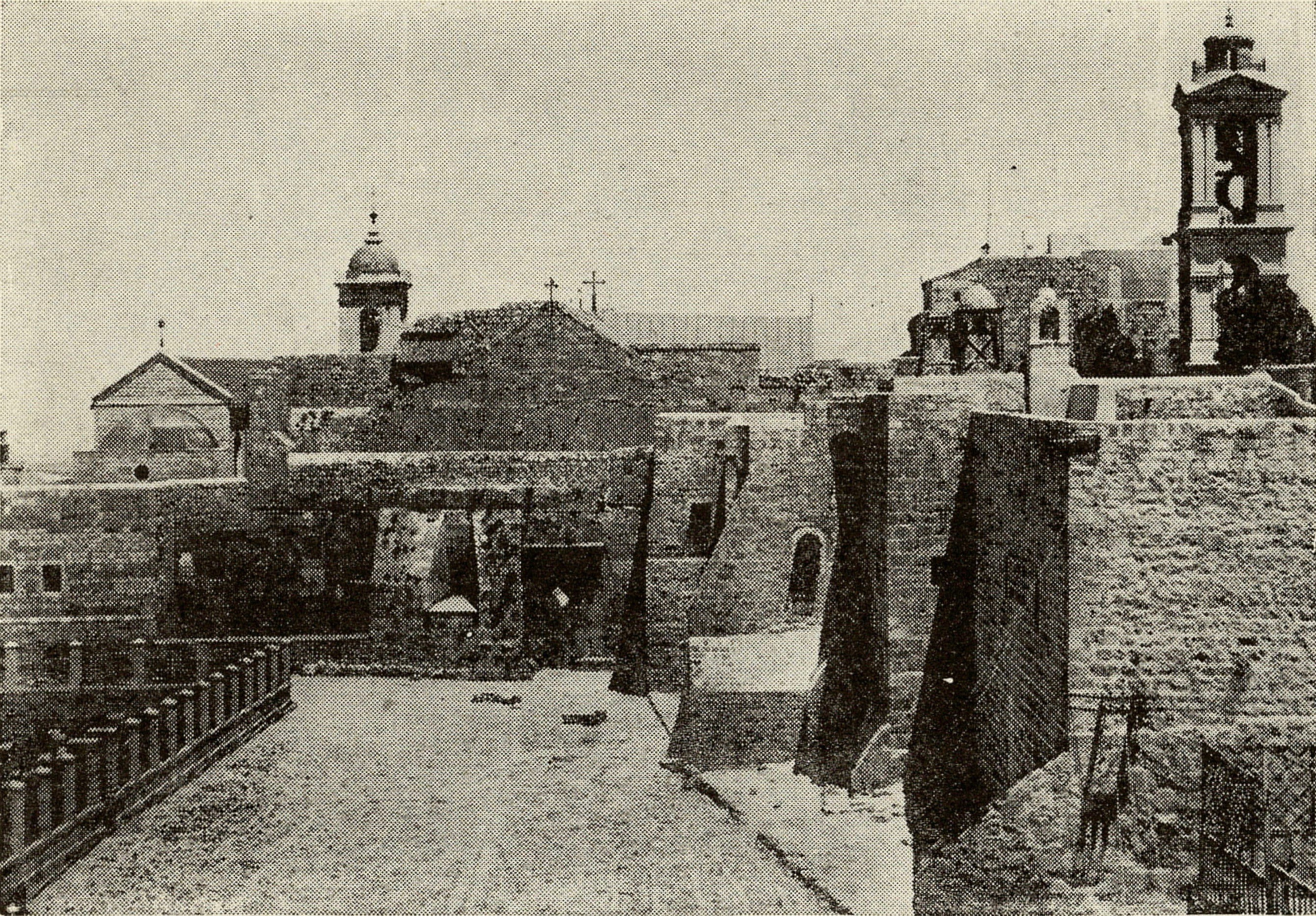
The facade, ca. 1940

In 1918 British governor Colonel Ronald Storrs demolished the wall erected in 1842 by the Greek Orthodox between nave and choir.

The passageway which connects St. Jerome's Cave and the Cave of the Nativity was expanded in February 1964, allowing easier access for visitors. American businessman Stanley Slotkin was visiting at the time and purchased a quantity of the limestone rubble, more than a million irregular fragments about 5 mm (0.20 in) across. He sold them to the public encased in plastic crosses, and they were advertised in infomercials in 1995.

During the Second Intifada in April 2002, the church was the site of a month-long siege in which approximately 50 armed Palestinians wanted by the Israel Defense Forces (IDF) barricaded themselves inside the church. Christian authorities in the church gave the fighters food, water, and shelter. Israeli media claimed that the Christians inside were being held hostage, however, parishioners inside the church say they and the church were treated with respect.

Curtains caught fire in the grotto beneath the church on 27 May 2014, which resulted in some slight damage.

The church's joint owners undertook a major renovation starting in September 2013, probably to be completed in 2021 (see also under Restoration (2013–2019)).

==== World Heritage Site ====
In 2012, the church complex became the first Palestinian site to be listed as a World Heritage Site by the World Heritage Committee at its 36th session on 29 June. It was approved by a secret vote of 13–6 in the 21-member committee, according to UNESCO spokeswoman Sue Williams, and following an emergency candidacy procedure that by-passed the 18-month process for most sites, despite the opposition of the United States and Israel. The site was approved under criteria four and six. The decision was a controversial one on both technical and political terms. It was placed on the List of World Heritage in Danger from 2012 to 2019, as it was suffering from damages due to water leaks.

==== Restoration (2013–2019) ====
===== Endangered status =====
The basilica was placed on the 2008 Watch List of the 100 Most Endangered Sites by the World Monuments Fund:

The present state of the church is worrying. Many roof timbers are rotting, and have not been replaced since the 19th century. The rainwater that seeps into the building not only accelerates the rotting of the wood and damages the structural integrity of the building, but also damages the 12th-century wall mosaics and paintings. The influx of water also means that there is an ever-present chance of an electrical fire. If another earthquake were to occur on the scale of the one of 1834, the result would most likely be catastrophic. ... It is hoped that the listing will encourage its preservation, including getting the three custodians of the church—the Greek Orthodox Church, the Armenian Orthodox Church, and the Franciscan order—to work together, which has not happened for hundreds of years. The Israeli government and the Palestinian Authority would also have to work together to protect it.

A Presidential committee for the restoration of the Nativity Church was appointed in 2008. In the following year, an international consortium team of experts from different Universities, under the supervision of Prof. Claudio Alessandri (University of Ferrara, Italy), was given the task of planning and coordinating the restoration works.

===== Logistics and organisation =====
In 2010, the Palestinian Authority announced that a multimillion-dollar restoration programme was imminent. Although a majority Muslim nation, albeit with a significant Christian minority, Palestinians consider the church a national treasure and one of their most visited tourist sites. President Mahmoud Abbas has been actively involved in the project, which is led by Ziad al-Bandak. The project is partially funded by Palestinians and conducted by a team of Palestinian and international experts.

===== Restoration process =====
The initial phase of the restoration work was completed in early 2016. New windows have been installed, structural repairs on the roof have been completed and art works and mosaics have been cleaned and restored. The works went further with the consolidation of the narthex, the cleaning and consolidation of all wooden elements, the cleaning of wall mosaics, mural paintings, and floor mosaics. The works came to pause in 2021; however there is still restoration work to be done as of June 2024. The remaining goals of the project include: the conservation of the stone tiles of the Church of the Nativity's front yard, the addition of a firefighting system, a climate control system, structural consolidation, further prevention of seismic activity damage, and the restoration of the central nave. The most necessary of the repairs yet to be done is restoration of the Grotto of the Nativity.

===== Discoveries =====
Italian restoration workers uncovered a seventh surviving mosaic angel in July 2016, which was previously hidden under plaster. According to the Italian restorer Marcello Piacenti, the mosaics "are made of gold leaf placed between two glass plates" and solely "faces and limbs are drawn with small pieces of stone."

== Property and administration ==
The property rights, liturgical use and maintenance of the church are regulated by a set of documents and understandings known as the Status Quo. The church is owned by three church authorities, the Greek Orthodox (most of the building and furnishings), the Catholic and the Armenian Apostolic (each of them with lesser properties). The Coptic Orthodox and Syriac Orthodox are holding minor rights of worship at the Armenian church in the northern transept, and at the Altar of Nativity. There have been repeated brawls among monk trainees over quiet respect for others' prayers, hymns and even the division of floor space for cleaning duties. The Palestinian police are often called to restore peace and order.

== Site architecture and layout ==
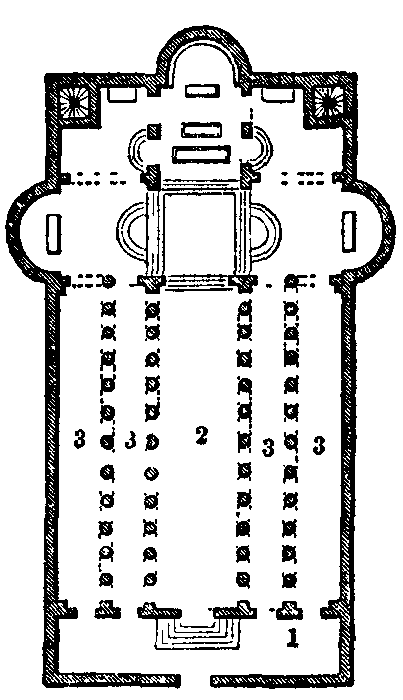
Plan of the Church of the Nativity from the 1911 Encyclopædia Britannica. (1) Narthex; (2) nave; (3) aisles. The Grotto of the Nativity is situated right underneath the chancel, with the silver star at its eastern end (top side of the plan). North is to the left.

The centrepiece of the Nativity complex is the Grotto of the Nativity, a cave which enshrines the site where Jesus is said to have been born.

The core of the complex connected to the Grotto consists of the Church of the Nativity itself, and the adjoining Catholic Church of St. Catherine north of it.

=== Outer courtyard ===
Bethlehem's main city square, Manger Square, is an extension of the large paved courtyard in front of the Church of the Nativity and St Catherine's. Here crowds gather on Christmas Eve to sing Christmas carols in anticipation of the midnight services.

=== Basilica of the Nativity ===
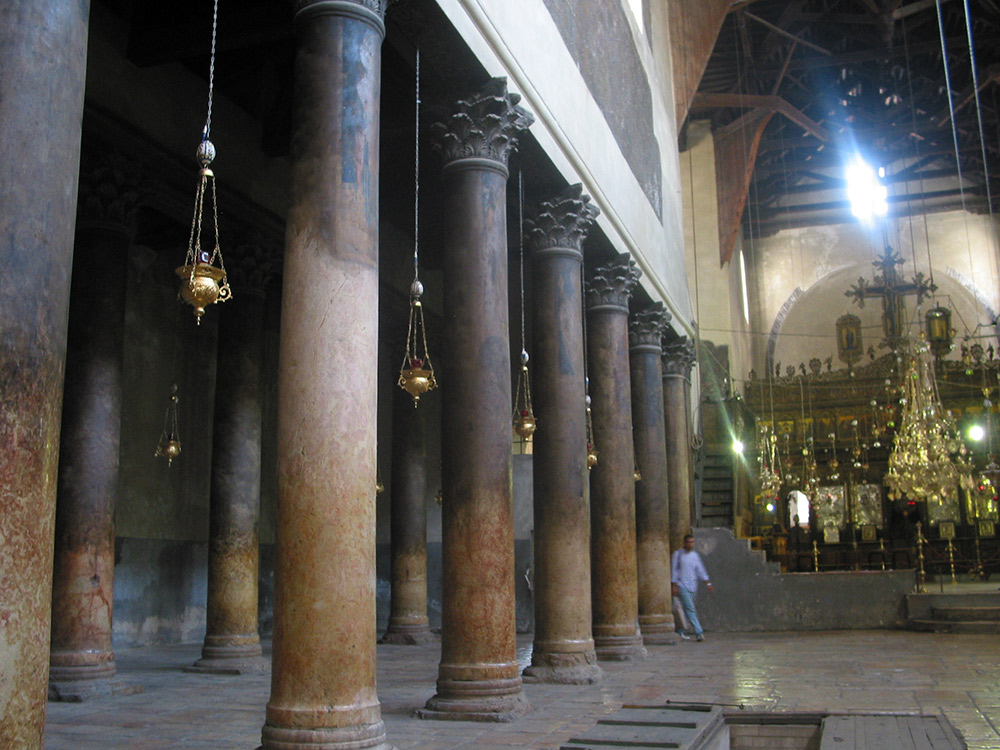
Interior–northern aisles (left) and chancel (right)–before the latest renovations

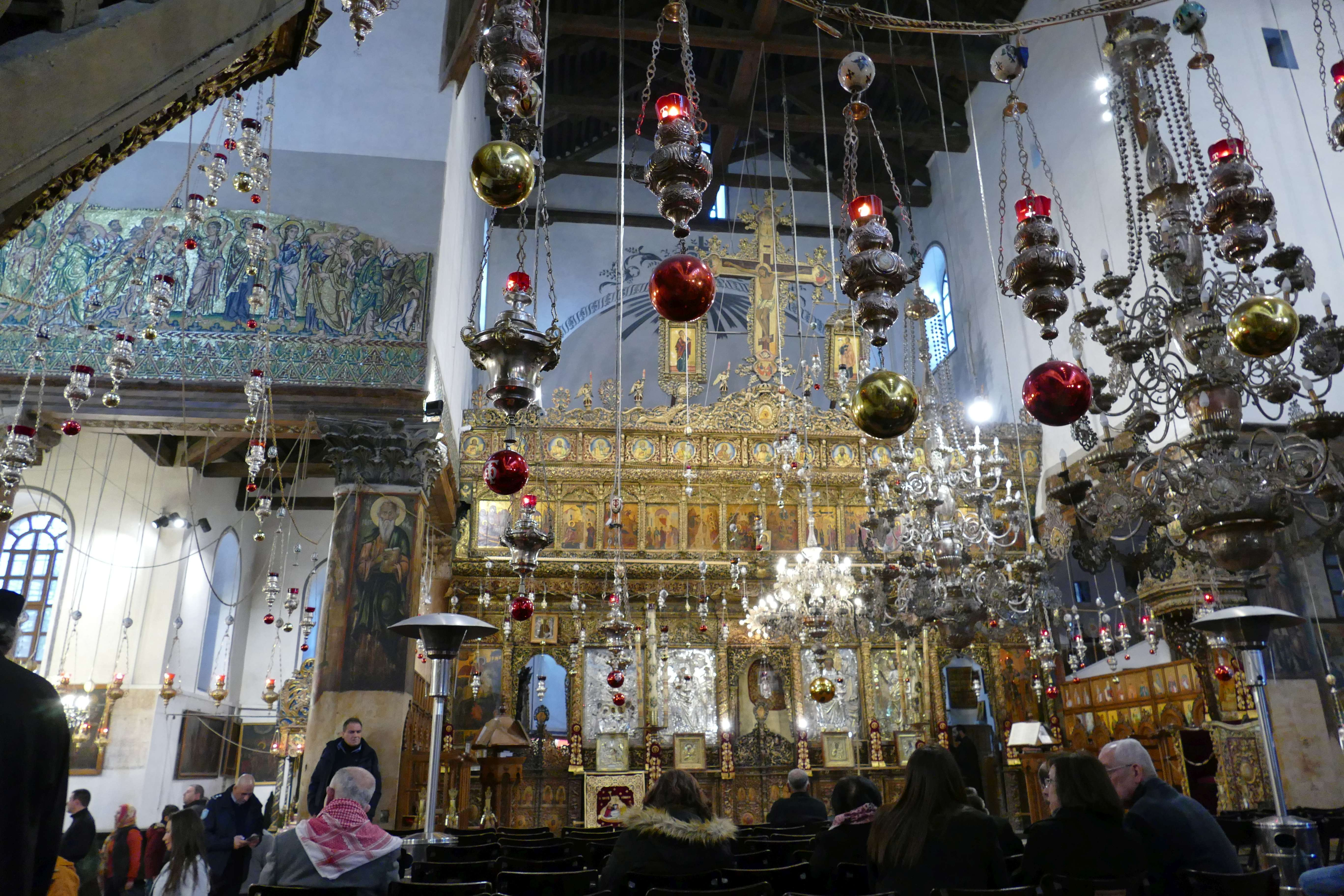
The chancel with gilded iconostasis (2019)

The main Basilica of the Nativity is maintained by the Greek Orthodox Patriarchate of Jerusalem. It is designed like a typical Roman basilica, with five aisles formed by Corinthian columns, and an apse in the eastern end containing the sanctuary.

The basilica is entered through a very low door called the "Door of Humility."

The church's interior walls feature medieval golden mosaics once covering the side walls, which are now in large parts lost.

The original Roman-style floor of the basilica has been covered over with flagstones, but there is a trap door in the floor which opens up to reveal a portion of the original mosaic pavement from the Constantinian basilica.

There are 44 columns separating the aisles from each other and from the nave, some of which are painted with images of saints, such as the Irish monk Catald (fl. 7th century), the patron of the Sicilian Normans, Canute IV (c. 1042–1086), king of Denmark, and Olaf II (995–1030), king of Norway.

The east end of the church consists of a raised chancel, closed by an apse containing the main altar and separated from the chancel by a large gilded iconostasis.

A complex array of sanctuary lamps is placed throughout the entire building.

The open ceiling exposes the wooden rafters, recently restored. The previous 15th-century restoration used beams donated by King Edward IV of England, who also donated lead to cover the roof; however, this lead was taken by the Ottoman Turks, who melted it down for ammunition to use in war against Venice.

Stairways on either side of the chancel lead down to the Grotto.

=== Grotto of the Nativity ===
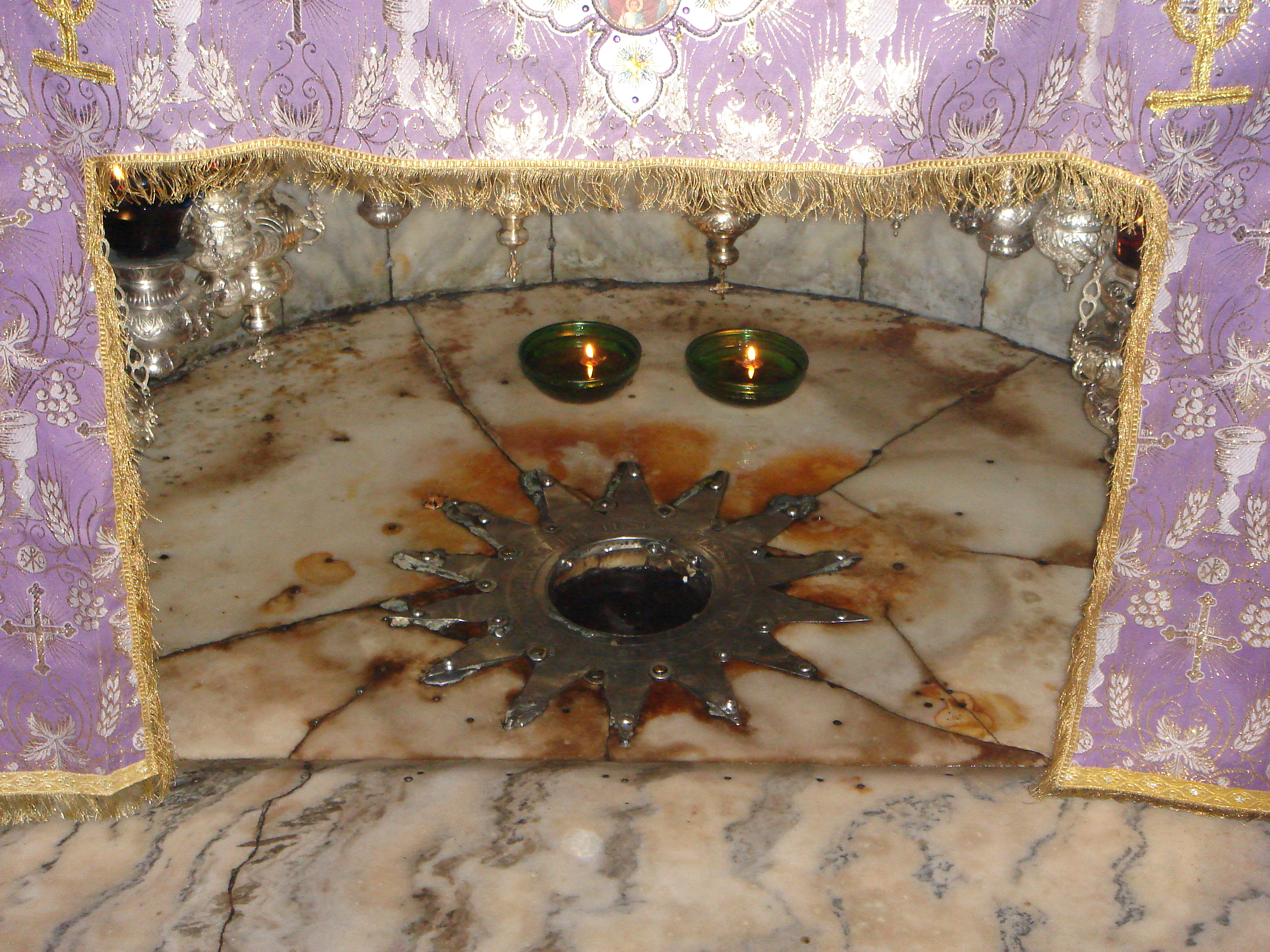
Grotto of the Nativity, fourteen-point silver star under the main altar marking the traditional spot of Jesus' birth

The Grotto of the Nativity, the place where Jesus is said to have been born, is an underground space which forms the crypt of the Church of the Nativity. It is situated underneath its main altar, and it is normally accessed by two staircases on either side of the chancel. The grotto is part of a network of caves, which are accessed from the adjacent Church St Catherine's. The tunnel-like corridor connecting the Grotto to the other caves is normally locked.

The cave has an eastern niche said to be the place where Jesus was born, which contains the Altar of Nativity. The exact spot where Jesus was born is marked beneath this altar by a 14-pointed silver star with the Latin inscription Hic De Virgine Maria Jesus Christus Natus Est-1717 ("Here Jesus Christ was born to the Virgin Mary-1717"). It was installed by the Catholics in 1717, removed – allegedly by the Greeks – in 1847, and replaced by the Turkish government in 1853. The star is set into the marble floor and surrounded by 15 silver lamps representing the three Christian communities: six belong to the Greek Orthodox, four to the Catholics, and five to the Armenian Apostolic. The Altar of the Nativity is maintained by the Greek Orthodox and Armenian Apostolic churches. The significance of the 14 points on the star is to represent the three sets of 14 generations in the genealogy of Jesus Christ: First 14 from Abraham to David, then 14 from David to the Babylonian captivity, then 14 more to Jesus Christ. In the middle of the 14 pointed star is a circular hole, through which one can reach in to touch the stone that is said to be the original stone that Mary lay on when she gave birth to Jesus.

On the apse above the altar was a 12th-century mosaic depicting the Nativity; the base of the mosaic read "Gloria in excelsis Deo et in terra pax hominibus bonae voluntatis" ("Glory to God in the highest and on earth peace to men of good will"). The mosaic was vandalized in 1873 by Greeks who rioted against the Franciscans. Fragments of the mosaic can still be seen on the apse but are covered over by an icon during liturgical celebrations by the Greeks and Armenians.

Catholics are in charge of a section of the grotto known as the Grotto of the Manger, marking the traditional site where Mary laid the newborn baby in the manger. The Altar of the Magi is located directly opposite from the manger site. The Franciscans are also in charge of a door, at the opposite end of the Altar of the Nativity, that opens to a passageway connecting the grotto with the underground chapels of Saint Catherine Church.

=== Church of St. Catherine ===
The adjoining Church of St. Catherine is a Catholic church dedicated to Catherine of Alexandria, built in a more modern Gothic Revival style. It has been further modernized according to the liturgical trends which followed Vatican II.

This is the church where the Latin Patriarch of Jerusalem celebrates Midnight Mass on Christmas Eve. Certain customs in this Midnight Mass predate Vatican II, but must be maintained because the Status Quo was legally fixed by a Firman (decree) in 1852 under the Ottoman Empire, which is still in force today.

The bas-relief of the Tree of Jesse is a 3.75 by 4 metres (12 ft 4 in by 13 ft 1 in) sculpture by Czesław Dźwigaj which was recently incorporated into the Church of St. Catherine as a gift of Pope Benedict XVI during his trip to the Holy Land in 2009. It represents an olive tree as the Tree of Jesse, displaying the genealogy of Jesus from Abraham through Joseph, as well as symbolism from the Old Testament. The upper portion is dominated by a crowned figure of Christ the King in an open-armed pose blessing the Earth. It is situated along the passage used by pilgrims making their way to the Grotto of the Nativity.

=== Caves accessed from St. Catherine's ===
Several chapels are found in the caves accessed from St. Catherine's, including the Chapel of Saint Joseph commemorating the angel's appearance to Joseph, commanding him to flee to Egypt; the Chapel of the Innocents, commemorating the children killed by Herod; and the Chapel of Saint Jerome, in the underground cell where tradition holds he lived while translating the Bible into Latin (the Vulgate).

== Tombs ==
=== Traditional tombs of saints ===
According to a tradition not sustained by history, the tombs of four Catholic saints are said to be located beneath the Church of the Nativity, in the caves accessible from the Church of St. Catherine:

- Jerome, whose remains are said to have been transferred to the basilica of Santa Maria Maggiore in Rome
- Paula, a disciple and benefactor of Jerome
- Eustochium, the daughter of Paula
- Eusebius of Cremona, a disciple of Jerome. A different tradition holds that he is buried in Italy.

=== Ancient burials ===
A number of ancient trough-shaped tombs can be seen in the Catholic-owned caves adjacent to the Nativity Grotto and St Jerome's Cave, some of them inside the Chapel of the Innocents; more tombs can be seen on the southern, Greek-Orthodox side of the Basilica of the Nativity, also presented as being those of the infants murdered by Herod.

According to researcher Haytham Dieck, rock-cut tombs and bone fragments in one restricted room of the church date from the 1st century AD. In another clandestine chamber, the Cave of the Holy Innocents, skulls and other bones from as many as 2,000 people (according to Dieck) are collected, but are clearly not infantile.

== Christmas in Bethlehem ==
There are three different dates for the celebration of Christmas Eve and Christmas Day in Bethlehem:

- 24 and 25 December for the Catholics (Latins), who use the General Roman Calendar (Gregorian);
- 6 and 7 January for the Greek Orthodox, together with the Syriac Orthodox, Ethiopian and Coptic Orthodox, who use the Julian calendar;
- 18 and 19 January for the Armenian Apostolic Church, which combines the celebration of the Nativity with that of the Baptism of Jesus into the Armenian Feast of Theophany on 6 January, according to the early traditions of Eastern Christianity, but follows the rules of the Armenian Patriarchate of Jerusalem in its calculations (6 January Julian style corresponds to 19 January Gregorian style).

=== Latin Catholic and Protestant ===
The Catholic Midnight Mass in Bethlehem on Christmas Eve is broadcast around the world. Festivities begin hours earlier when dignitaries welcome the Latin Patriarch of Jerusalem at the entrance to the city, near Rachel's Tomb. Accompanied by a parade of youth organizations, he then makes his way to Manger Square, where crowds are waiting. Finally, he enters the Catholic Church of Saint Catherine for Mass, after which he leads the way to the adjacent Church of the Nativity. The patriarch carries a figurine of the Baby Jesus and places it on the silver star in the Nativity Grotto under the basilica.

Protestants worship either at the Lutheran church or the Church of the Nativity. However, some Protestant congregations go to Beit Sahour, a village near Bethlehem.

=== Greek Orthodox ===
On the Orthodox Christmas Eve, 13 days later, many visitors and faithful again fill Manger Square, this time to watch processions and receptions for the religious leaders of the different Eastern Orthodox communities.

=== Armenian ===
Members of the Armenian community are the last ones to celebrate Christmas, on 18 and 19 January, in their own section of the Nativity Church. The altars there are also used by the smaller denominations during their respective Christmas festivities.

== Gallery ==
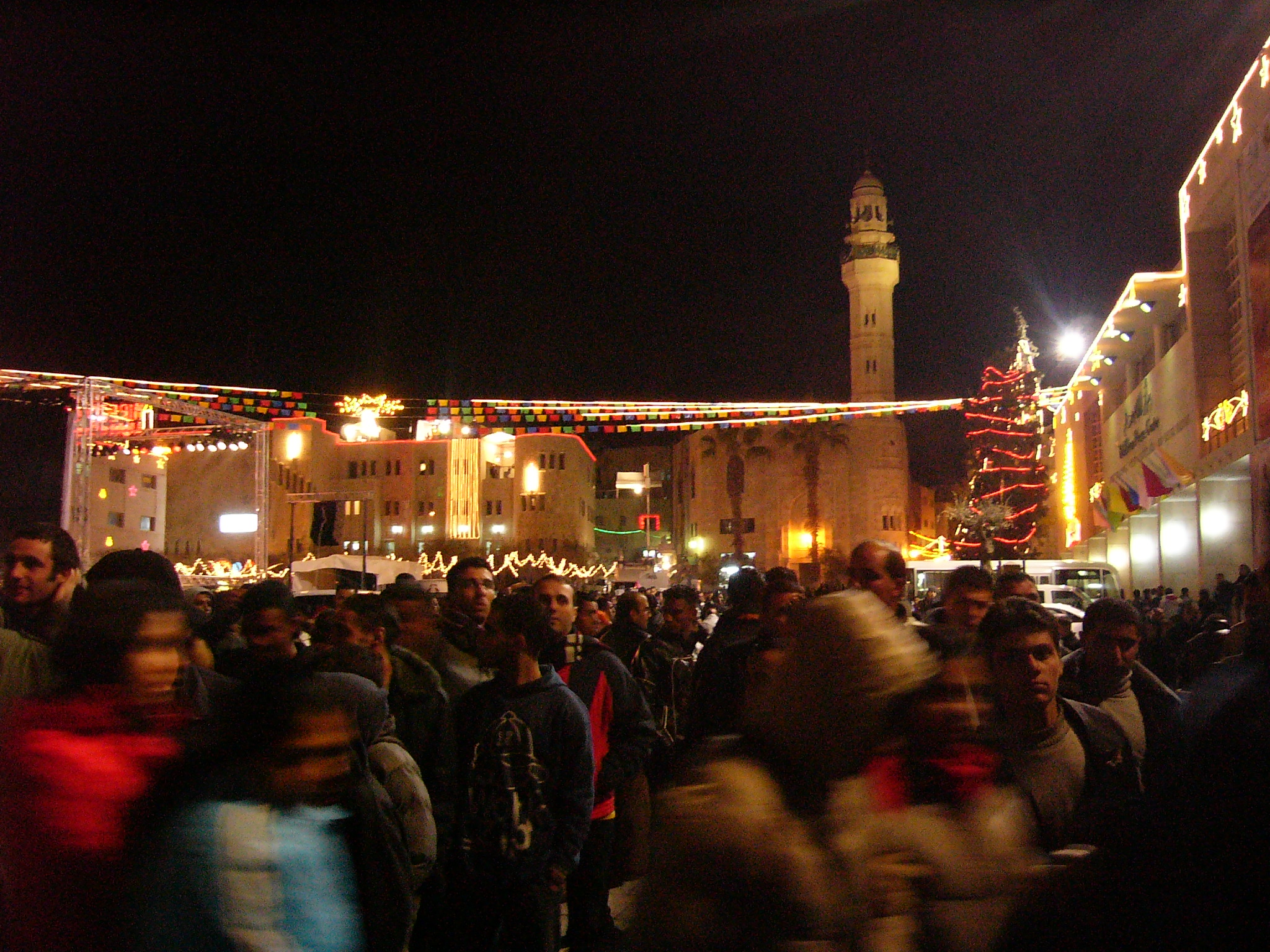
Christmas Eve 2006 in Manger Square

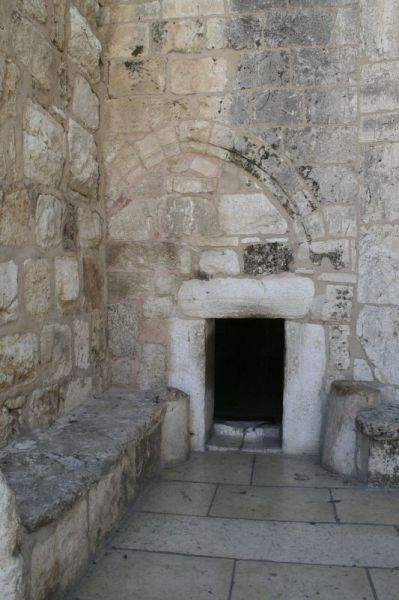
The Door of Humility, main entrance into the Church

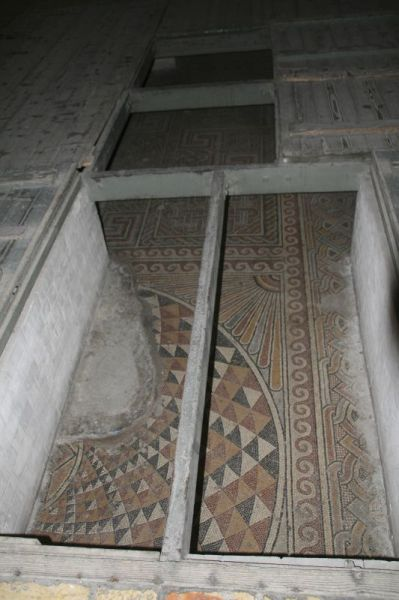
Constantine's 4th-century mosaic floor rediscovered in 1934

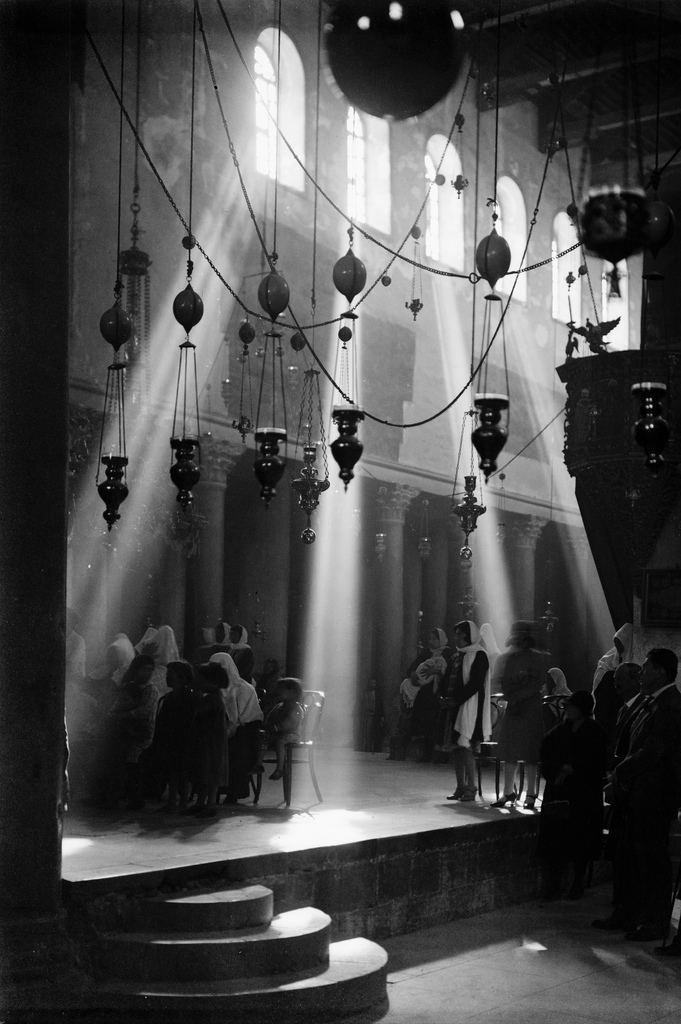
The interior of the Church of the Nativity circa 1936, photographed by Lewis Larsson

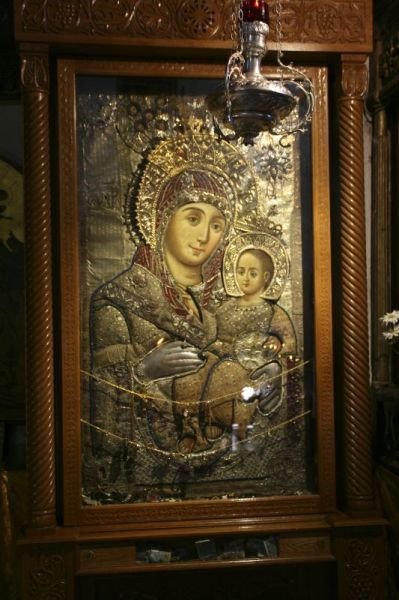
Icon of Mary and Jesus ("Mary of Bethleem") near the staircase to the Nativity Grotto

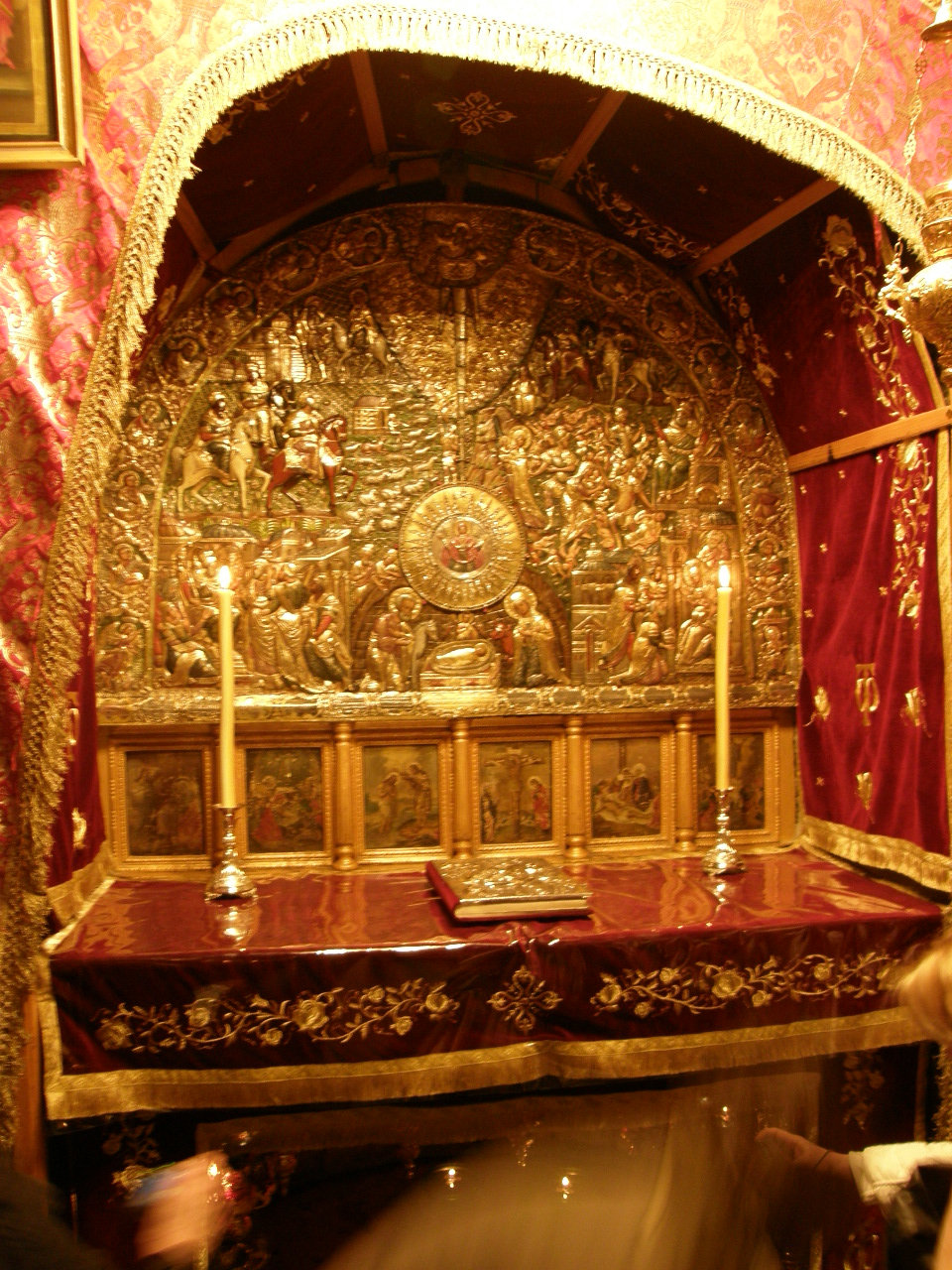
The upper part of the Altar of the Nativity

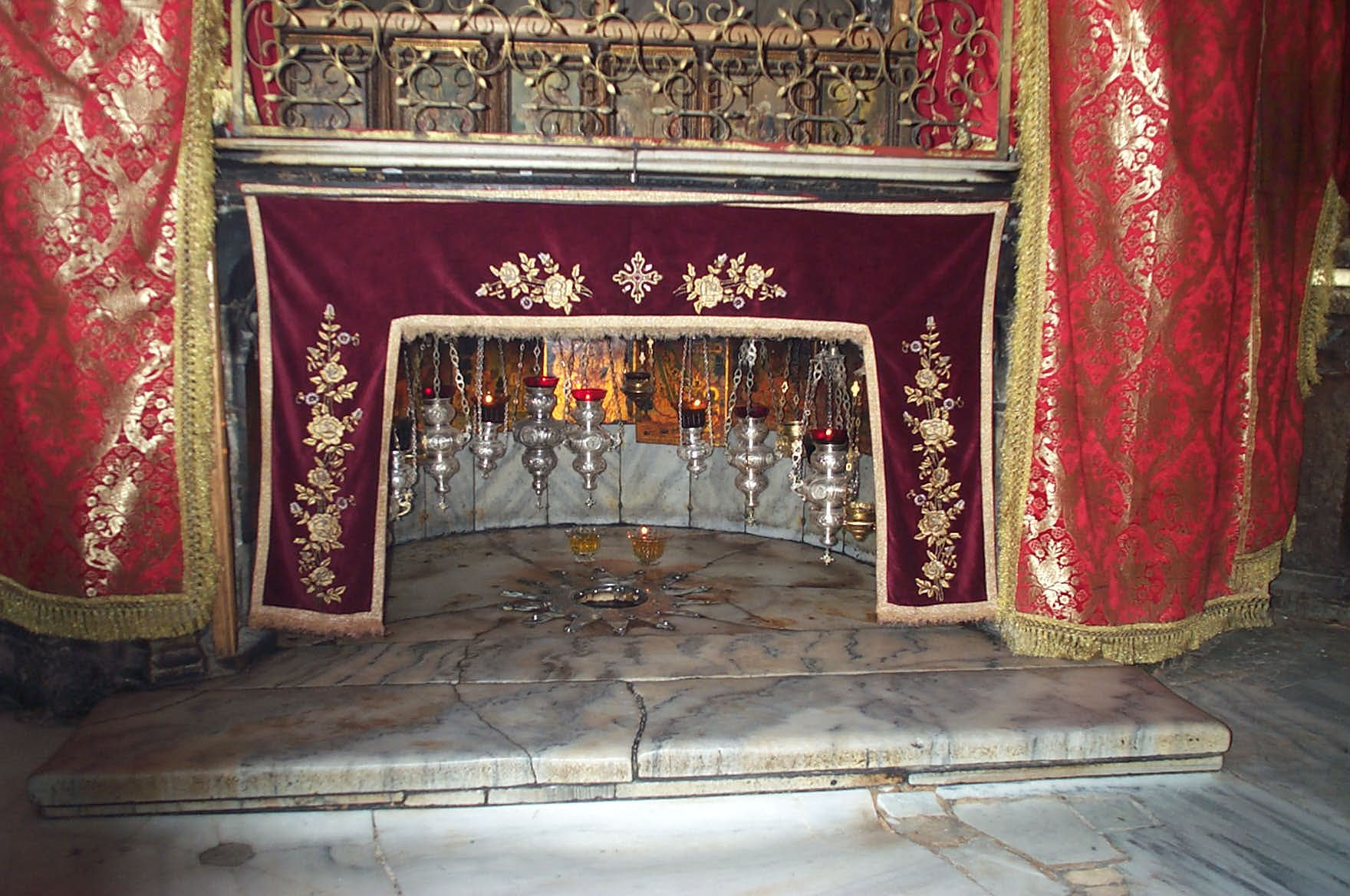
The Altar of the Nativity, beneath which is the star marking the spot where tradition says Jesus was born

== See also ==
- Nativity of Jesus
- Nativity scene
- Early Christian art and architecture
- List of oldest church buildings
- Palestinian Christians
