= Yamsafer =

Yamsafer.com

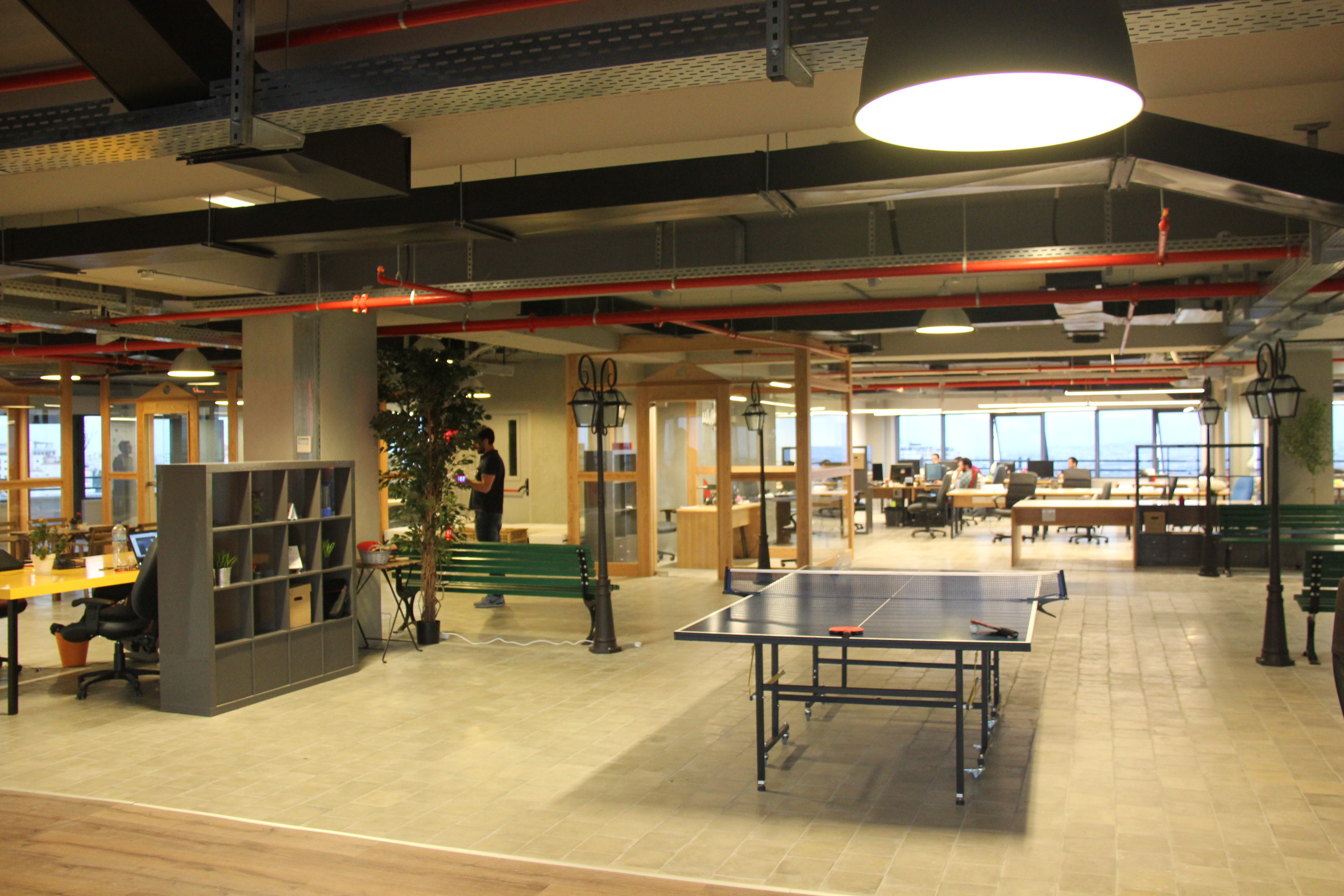
- Industry: Hotel booking service
- Founded: 2011
- Defunct: 2020
- Headquarters: Ramallah, Palestine
- Website: www.yamsafer.com

Yamsafer was an online accommodation booking website in the Middle East. The company combined website, mobile app and call center booking methods in its service delivery for all destinations around the world. It was described by Tech Crunch, as the "Middle East's Booking.com".

== History ==
Yamsafer was founded in 2011 by Palestinian entrepreneurs Faris Zaher, Sameh Alfar and Seri Abdelhadi. The startup went on to become the first Palestinian company to secure an early-stage venture capital investment. In June 2015 Yamsafer went on to secure $3.5m in its Series B round from Global Founders Capital, marking the largest round of venture capital financing to be raised by a Palestine-based company and the first-ever foreign led round of investment in a local company. In October 2018 the company ranked 5th in "Top 12 Up and Coming Companies In The Middle East" by Forbes. The selection criteria were based on providing a sustainable business model, raising significant amounts of capital and delivering growth to investors.

Following the beginning of the COVID-19 pandemic in 2020 and the imposition of travel restrictions the company was forced to close.

== Innovations ==
=== Cardless Booking ===
In January 2014, Yamsafer was the first in the travel industry to provide the unique feature of "Cardless Bookings", where customers did not need a credit card to guarantee or confirm a hotel reservation, but instead were required to make payment once they arrive at the hotel. The feature was available in select regions and cities including Amman, Madaba, Aqaba, Dead Sea, Ramallah, Bethlehem, Cairo, Jeddah, Kuwait City and Manama. The cardless bookings feature was introduced as a result of the significantly lower credit card penetration rates in the MENA region compared to more mature markets, and to also help eliminate customer fears of providing their credit card information online. With the "Cardless Bookings" feature, Yamsafer removed the traditional deposit fee requirements usually requested by hotels of their guests.

=== Yamsafer's Mobile Application ===
In 2015, Yamsafer released a mobile booking app with the purpose of pushing top deals with last minute prices. Such measures fill the gap between unoccupied hotel rooms and same day bookers.

=== Yamsafer Homes ===
In 2016, Yamsafer launched Yamsafer Homes, its own vacation rental brand.

== Recognition ==
Yamsafer received recognition as part of the tech start-up scene in Palestine. Yamsafer also provided smaller hotels and guesthouses, which were previously offline, the opportunity to market themselves in an online space and serve international markets.

In January 2011, Wamda selected Yamsafer as the Best ecommerce startup as part of the Best MENA Startups of 2011 competition. In early June 2015, Yamsafer announced the closing of its second round of investment of US$3.5 Million, led by Global Founders Capital with participation by Sadara Ventures and other undisclosed investors.
