= Name days in Croatia =

In Croatia, a name day (Croatian: imendan) is a day corresponding to a date in the Catholic calendar when the respective saint's day is celebrated. Even though celebration of the name day is less usual than celebrating birthday, the name day is more often congratulated by broader number of acquaintances. This is because the date of birth is seldom known and the person's name is known to many.

The names that are celebrated on the certain saint's day are all the names that correspond to the respective name and all the derivative names. If there are different version of the same name in different languages (e.g. John, which in Croatian is Ivan and in Spanish is Juan) all the respective names are celebrated. Sometimes both sexes are celebrated for the same saint (usually male). For example, November 30 is the day of Saint Andrew apostle, and both Andrija (male) and Andreja (female) are celebrated.

When several saints share the same name, imendan calendars will show all of them. However, it is customary to celebrate only one of them, typically the most famous.

See also General Roman Calendar and Tridentine calendar.

Names attributed to a certain saint link to the wikiarticle about the saint.

== January ==
1. Marija, Reljefima
2. Bazilije, Grgur
3. Isusovo, Genoveva, Cvijeta
4. Sdislava
5. Emilijana, Radoslav, Miljenko
6. Gašpar (Note: For date of birth see Gaspar del Bufalo; saints normally have their feast on the day they died.)
7. Rajmund, (Note: (see August 31)) Lucijan, Zorislav
8. Severin, Bogoljub, Apolinarij
9. Julijan, Živko, Miodrag
10. Agaton, Dobroslav, Aldo
11. Honorat, Neven
12. Arkadije, Živana, Ernest
13. Hilarije, Veselko, Radovan
14. Felik, Srećko
15. Franjo (Note: (see October 4))
16. Marcel, Oton, Mislav
17. Antun, Lavoslav, Vojmil
18. Marg., Priska
19. Mario, Ljiljana, Marta
20. Fabijan, Sebastijan
21. Agneza, Janja, Neža
22. Vinko, Irena
23. Emerencijana, Ema, Vjera, Milko
24. Franjo, Bogoslav
25. Ananija
26. Timotej, Tit, Paula, Tonka
27. Angela, Vitalijan, Pribislav
28. Toma, Tomislav
29. Vilana, Valerije, Konstancije
30. Martina, Tina, Gordana
31. Ivan, (Note: (see June 24)) Marcela, Julije

== February ==
1. Brigita, Gita, Miroslav
2. Marijan
3. Blaž, Vlaho, Tripun
4. Katarina, Andrija, (Note: (see November 30)) Veronika
5. Agata, Dobrila, Jagoda
6. Pavao, (Note: (see June 29)) Doroteja, Dora
7. Pio, Rikard, (Note: (see April 3)) Držislav
8. Jeronim, Jerko (Note: (see September 30))
9. Apolonija, Zora, Sunčica
10. Alojzije, Skolastika, Rastija Luzer
11. Lurdska
12. Reginald, Damjan, Eulalija
13. Jordan, Božidar, Božica
14. Valentin, Valentina, Zdravko
15. Klaudije
16. Onezim, Julijana, Miljenko
17. Donat
18. Angelico, Šimun, Flavijan, Gizela
19. Konrad, Ratko, Blago
20. Lav, Lea
21. Petar, (Note: (see June 29)) Damir, Eleonora
22. Grozdan
23. Polikarp, Romana
24. Montan, Goran, Modest, Ranko
25. (no name)
26. Aleksandar, Alka, Sandra, Branimir
27. Gabriel, Donat
28. Roman, Teofil, Bogoljub
29. (no name)

== March ==
1. Čista, Albin, Zoran
2. Ines, Čedomil, Iskra
3. Anzelmo, Marin, Kamilo
4. Kazimir, Eugen, Natko
5. Euzebije, Vedran
6. Koleta, Zvjezdana, Viktor
7. Perpetua, Felicita, Ardo
8. Pačista, Ivan od Boga
9. Franciska, Franjka
10. Emilijan, Emil, Krunoslav
11. Firmil, Trvtko
12. Bernard, Budislav, Maksimilijan
13. Rozalija, Ratka, Kristina m.
14. Matilda, Miljana, Borka
15. Bezimena, Longin
16. Hrvoje, Miljan
17. Patrik, Domagoj, Hrvatin
18. Ćiril Jeruzalemski, Cvjetan
19. Josip, Joso, Joško
20. Klaudija, Dionizije, Vladislav
21. Kristijan, Vesna, Vlasta
22. Sredoposna, Oktav
23. Oton, Dražen
24. Katarina, Simeon
25. Blagovijest
26. Montan i Maksima, Emanuel
27. Ivan Damašć., Rupert, Lidija, Lada
28. Priska, Sonja, Polion
29. Gluha, Jona, Bertold
30. Kvirin, Viktor, Krescent, Bosiljka
31. Benjamin, Amos, Ljubomir

== April ==
1. Hugo, Teodora
2. Franjo, Dragoljub
3. Rikard, Svevlad, Benedikt
4. Izidor b., Dora, Strahimir
5. CVIJETNICA
6. Vilim, Rajko
7. Ivan de la Salle, Herman, Epifan
8. Dionizije, Alemka
9. Marija Kleofina, Demetrije
10. Ezekijel
11. Stanislav, Stana, Radmila
12. Julije, Viktor, Davorka
13. Uskrsni ponedjeljak, Martin I., Ida
14. Valerijan, Maksim
15. Krescent, Bosiljka, Anastazija
16. Josip Benedikt Labre, Bernardica
17. Rudolf, Robert
18. Eleuterija, Amadej
19. Konrad, Ema, Rastislav
20. Janja from Montepulciano, Marcijan
21. Anzelmo, Goran
22. Soter i Kajo, Vojmil
23. Sv. Juraj, Juro, Ðuro, Ðurdica
24. Fidelis m., Vjeran, Vjerko, Vjera
25. Sv. Marko ap. i ev., Maroje
26. Kleto i Marcelin, Višnja
27. Ozana Kotorska, Jakov Zadranin
28. Petar Chanel, Ljudevit m. Grignon
29. Katarina Sijenska
30. Pio V. papa, Josip Cottolengo

== May ==
1. Josip
2. Anastazije, Eugen, Boris
3. Filip i Jakov ap., Jakica
4. Florijan, Cvjetko, Cvijeta
5. Vinko Fererski, Maksim, Andenlko
6. Dominik Savio, Nedjeljko, Benedikta
7. Dujam, Duje, Duška, Gizela kr.
8. Marija posrednica, Marina, Ida
9. Herman, Mirna, Beato, Kristofor
10. Ivan Merz, Gospa Trsat.
11. Mamerto
12. Leopold Mandic
13. Gospa Fatimska, Servacije, Ena
14. Matija ap., Mate, Matko, Matea
15. Solinski mucenici, Sofija
16. Ivan Nepomuk, Andrija Bobola, Nenad
17. Paskal, Paško
18. Ivan I. papa, Venancije, Srecko
19. Celestin V. p., Rajko, Teofil, Inka
20. Bernardin Sijenski
21. UZAŠAŠCE GOSP., SPASOVO
22. Renata, Rita, Jelena, Jagoda, Milan
23. Deziderije, Željko, Želimir, Vilim
24. Marija Pom., Prijenos sv. Dom.
25. Beda Casni, Grgur VII., papa
26. Filip Neri, Zdenko, Eleuterij
27. Augustin Canterburyjski
28. German
29. Polion i Euzebije, Veceslav
30. Ivana Arška
31. DUHOVI, Pohod BDM, MB Kam. vrata

== June ==
1. Marija, Justin, Malden
2. Marcelin i Petar, bl. Sadok, Eugen
3. Karlo Lwanga i dr.
4. Kvirin Sisacki, Petar from Verona, Predrag
5. Bonifacije, Valerija, Darinka
6. Nobert, Neda, Klaudije, Berto
7. Robert
8. Bl. Dijana i Cecilija, Medardo, Vilim
9. Efrem, Ranko
10. Margareta, Dijana, bl. Ivan Dominici
11. Barnaba ap., Borna
12. Ivan Fakundo, Bosiljko, Nino
13. Antun Padovanski, (Note: (see January 17)) Ante, Tonci, Toni
14. Rufin, Elizej, Zlatko
15. Vid, Modest
16. Franjo Regis
17. Laura, Nevenka, Adolf
18. Marko i Marcelijan, Ljubomir
19. Presveto Srce Isusovo, Romualdo
20. Bezgrešno Srce Marijino, Naum Ohrid.
21. Alojzije Gonzaga
22. Ivan Fisher, Toma More
23. Josip Caffasso, Sidonija, Zdenka
24. Rodenje Ivana Krstitelja
25. Vilim, Nora
26. Ivan i Pavao, Vigilije, Zoran
27. Ladislav kralj, Ciril Aleksandrijski
28. Irenej, Smiljan
29. Petar i Pavao, ap., Krešimir
30. Rimski prvomucenici, Kajo

== July ==
1. Estera
2. Oton, Višnja, Ostoja
3. Toma apostol, Tomislav, Tomo, Miki
4. Elizabeta Portugalska kr., Elza, Berta
5. Ciril i Metod, Slaven
6. Marija Goretti
7. Vilibald, Vilko, Klaudija
8. Akvila i Priscila
9. Marija Petkovic, Ivan from Cologne i muc.
10. Amalija, Alma, Ljubica, Ljuba
11. Benedikt opat, Olga, Oliver
12. Mislav, Tanja, Suzana
13. MAJKA BOŽJA BISTRICKA
14. Kamilo de Lellis, Miroslav
15. Bonaventura
16. Gospa Karmelska, Karmela
17. Bl. Ceslav Poljak, Branko, Dunja
18. Fridrik, Dalibor, Arnold, Natko
19. Justa i Rufina, Zlatka
20. Ilija prorok, Ilijana
21. Danijel prorok, Lovro Brindiški, Danica
22. Marija Magdalena
23. Brigita Švedska, Ivan Cassian, Slobodan
24. Kristina Bols., Mirjana
25. Jakov st. ap., Kristofor, Kristo
26. Joakim i Ana, Rod. BDM
27. Klement Ohridski, Natalija m.
28. Nazarije i Celzo mm., Inocent
29. Marta, Blaženka
30. Petar Krizolog, Rufin, Anda
31. Ignacije Loyolski, Vatroslav, Ognjen

== August ==
1. Alfons, Vjera, Nada
2. Gospa od Andela
3. Bl. Augustin Kažotic, Lidija
4. Ivan M. Vianney, Ivica, Tertulijan
5. Gospa Snježna, Snježana, Nives
6. Preobraženje Gospodinovo
7. Siksto II. p., Kajetan, Albert, Donat b.
8. Dominik, Nedjeljko, Dinko
9. Edith Stein, Tvrtko
10. Lovro dakon, Laura
11. Klara Asiška, Jasna, Jasminka
12. Anicet, Ena
13. Poncijan i Hipolit, Ivan Berchmans
14. Maksimilijan Kolbe, Alfred
15. Marija, Velika
16. Rok, Stjepan kralj
17. Hijacint Poljak, Slobodan
18. Jelena Križarica, bl. Manes
19. Ivan Eudes
20. Bernard cn., Branko, Dino
21. Pio X. p., Hermogen, Anastazij
22. BD Marija Kraljica, Regina, Vladislava
23. Ruža Limska, Filip
24. Bartol ap., Bariša, Zlata
25. Ljudevit IX., Josip Kalasancijski, Patricija
26. Aleksandar
27. Monika, Honorat, Caslav
28. Augustin, Tin, Gustav
29. Glavosijek Ivana Krstitelja, Sabina R.
30. Feliks, Radoslava
31. Rajmund, Rajko, Paulin

== September ==
1. Egidije, Branimir, Branislav, Tamara
2. Kalista, Divna
3. Grgur Veliki, Grga, Mansvet
4. Ruža Viterpska, Dunja, Ida
5. Bl. Majka Terezija, Lovro Just., Roman
6. Zakarija pr., Davor
7. Marko Krizin
8. Mala Gospa, Marica, Maja, Alen
9. Petar Klaver
10. Nikola Tolentino, Pulherija, Lijepa
11. Hijacint, Cvjetko, Miljenko
12. Ime Marijino, Marija
13. Ivan Zlatousti, Ljubo
14. Uzvišenje sv. Križa, Višeslav
15. Žalosna Gospa, Dolores
16. Kornelije i Cipirijan
17. Robert Belarmin, Rane sv. Franje
18. Ivan Macias, J. Kupert., Irena
19. Januarije, Emilija
20. Andrija Kim i dr.
21. Matej ap., Mate, Matko
22. Toma Vil., Mauricije
23. Padre Pio, Lino p., Tekla
24. Gospa od otkupljenja, Mercedes
25. Nikola of Flue, Aurelija, Kleofa, Firmin
26. Kuzma i Damjan, Damir
27. Vinko Paulski, Gaj
28. Dominik Ibanez i jap. muc., Vjenceslav
29. Mihovil, Rafael, Gabrijel, arkandeli
30. Jeronim, Jerko

== October ==
1. Tereza, Terezija
2. Andelko, Anda
3. Kandid, Maksimilijan, Evald
4. Franjo Asiški
5. Rajmund of Capua, Flavijan, Miodrag
6. Bruno, Fides, Verica, Vjera
7. Kraljica Svete Kruniće
8. Šimun, Zvonimir
9. Ljudevit Bertran, Dionizije, Iván León
10. Franjo Borgija, Danijel, Danko
11. Emilijan, Bruno K.
12. Serafin, Makso, Edvin
13. Edvard kr., Edo, Teofil
14. Kalist I., papa mucenik
15. Terezija Avilska, Tereza, Zlata
16. Margareta Marija Alacoque
17. Ignacije Antiohijski, Vatroslav, Ognjen
18. Luka ev., Trifonija
19. Pavao od Križa
20. Vendelin, Irena, Miroslava
21. Uršula, Hilarija
22. Marija Saloma, Dražen, Cedomil
23. Ivan Kapistran, Borislav, Severin
24. Antun M. Claret, Jaroslav
25. Katarina Kotromanic
26. Demetrije Sr., Zvonimir
27. Sabina Avil., Gordana, Cvitko
28. Šimun i Juda Tadej apaostoli
29. Narcis, Stojko, Darko, Ida
30. Marcel, Marojko, Lukan, German
31. Alfonz Rodriquez, Vuk, Vukmir

== November ==
1. Svetislav, Sveto
2. Dušica, Duško
3. Martin de Porres, Hubert
4. Karlo Boromejski, Dragutin, Drago
5. Emerik, Mirko, Srijemski mucenici
6. Leonard pust., Vedran, Sever
7. Engelbert, Andelko
8. Gracija Kotorski, Milotislav, Bogdan
9. Ivan Lateranski
10. Leon Veliki papa, Lavoslav, Lav
11. Martin biskup
12. Jozafat K., Milan, Renato
13. Stanislav Kostka, Brčko b., Stanko
14. Nikola Tavelic, Ivan Trogirski
15. Albert Veliki, Leopold
16. Margareta Škotska kr.
17. Elizabeta Ugarska, Igor, Grgur
18. Posveta Bazilike sv. Petra i Pavla
19. Janja Asiška, Matilda, Krispin
20. Feliks Valois, Srecko, Edmund
21. Prikazanje BDM, Gospa od Zdravlja
22. Cecilija, Filemon
23. Klement R., Milivoj
24. Sveti Vijet. muc., Krizogon, Krševan
25. Katarina Aleksandrijska
26. Konrad, Leonardo, Dubravko
27. Virgilije, Severin, Velimir
28. Jakov, Markijski, Katarina Laboure
29. Saturnin, Svjetlana
30. Andrija, Andreja

== December ==
1. Eligije, Božena
2. Bibijana, Blanka
3. Franjo, Klaudije, Lucije
4. Ivan Damašcanski, Barbara
5. Saba opat., Krispina, Sabina
6. Nikola bikup, Nikša
7. Ambrozije, bl. Marin from Kotor
8. Bezgrešno začeče BDM
9. Valerija, Zdravka
10. Gospa Loretska, Julija, Judita
11. Damaz I., Barsaba, Damir
12. Ivana Franciska Ch.
13. Lucija, Jasna, Svjetlana
14. Ivan od Križa, Krševan
15. Irenej, Drinske mucenice
16. Adela kr., Albina, Zorka
17. Lazar, Izak, Jolanda, Florijan
18. Gacijan, Bosiljko, Rufo, Dražen
19. Urban V. papa, Vladimir, Božica, Tea
20. Eugen, Makarije, Amon
21. Petar Kanizije, Perica
22. Honorat, Caslav, Zenon
23. Ivan Kentijski, Viktorija
24. Adam i Eva
25. Christmas (Božić), hence Božidar, Božo, Natalija, Nataša
26. Stjepan Prvomucenik, Krunoslav
27. Ivan ev., Ivo, Janko
28. Mladen, Nevenka
29. Toma Becket, David, Davor
30. Feliks I., papa; Sabin
31. Silvestar, Silvestrovo, Zahvalnica
