= Eusebius of Cremona =

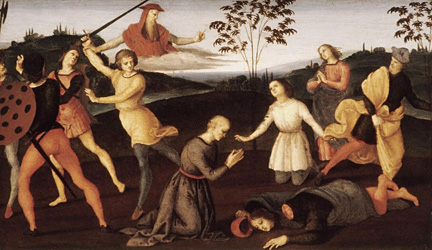
Raphael - Eusebius of Cremona raising Three Men from the Dead with Saint Jerome's Cloak.

Eusebius of Cremona was a 5th-century monk, pre-congregational saint, and disciple of Jerome.

== Life ==
He was born in Cremona. As a young man he travelled to Rome where he became an associate of Jerome, who was a secretary for Pope Damascus. Like Jerome he was a student of ardent and ascetic religion. He also formed at this time an informal ascetic fraternity in Rome with Marcella, Oceanus and Pammachius.

Jerome wrote a commentary on the Book of Jeremiah for him.

He travelled with Jerome to the Holy Land, where he met Saint Paula and Saint Eustochium. They travelled to Jerusalem, after which Eusebius founded a monastery in Bethlehem and acted as its abbot for a time, until returning to Cremona in 400. From Jerusalem, he may have travelled to Egypt with Jerome at about this time.

In AD 400 Eusebius returned to Italy via Dalmatia to raise funds for a pilgrim hostel. It was then that he represented Jerome to the Pope, and convinced the Pope of the error of Origen.

He succeeded Jerome as the head of his monastery, in Italy.

A tradition credits him with founding Guadalupe Abbey in Spain in latter life. Another late traditions credits him with raising three men from the dead, an event painted twice by Raphael Sanzio.

He lived until 423AD and is remembered with a feast day on May 5. It is unknown where he died. One tradition holds he is buried next to Jerome in Bethlehem, and the crypt there is dedicated to him, however a second tradition holds he is buried in Italy.

== Theology ==
During the Origen Disputes he was a vigorous and active supporter of Jerome, and is believed to have persuaded Pope Anastasius to condemn Origen's writings.

During the controversy, a letter form John, Bishop of Jerusalem to Eusebius, was stolen, and Jerome accused the thief of being in the service of Rufinus, who had until this time been on fairly good relations with Eusebius. Jerome made this claim because Rufinius sent the document to the Pope, accusing Jerome of having falsified the original. The pope eventually sides with Jerome. Rufinius accused Eusebius of being "evil in this matter" and of conspiring with Marcella.

There is a pseudepigraphical letter from Eusebius to Pope Damascus.

Eusebius also sided with Jerome in the disputes with Pelagius.
