= Saint Asella =

Asella nun, hermit
- Born: c. 334; Rome
- Died: c. 406
- Venerated in: Catholic Church
- Feast: December 6

Saint Asella, also known as Osella and Ocella (c. 334–c. 406), was a Roman virgin and hermit who was a disciple and friend of Saint Jerome, who spoke of her in his writings. She was a member of a noble and wealthy Roman Christian family, perhaps the sister of Marcella, another ascetic and saint.

== Life ==
When Asella was ten years old, she heard St. Athanasius speak during his third and final visit to Rome, and that, already being a "pious child", inspired her to "dedicate her life to the service of Christ". At first, her parents would not allow her to wear the garments usually worn by ascetics, but she secretly sold a gold necklace, paid for the garment's production, and when she was 12, surprised her parents by appearing to them in "this garb of consecration".

From that time on, Asella lived in silence and seclusion, living in a small cell, sleeping on the ground or on a stone, upon which she also prayed. She fasted all year, living on bread, salt, and water, often eating nothing for two or three days, and would fast for many weeks at a time during Lent. She lived a life of self-isolation, leaving her cell only to visit the churches of the martyrs, and often without being seen by others, and rarely by her own sister. According to historian Claude Fleury, Asella never spoke to any man. As hagiographer Agnes Dunbar stated, "She worked with her hands and sang psalms". Despite her austere lifestyle, it did not affect her health; Jerome wrote that "with a sound body and even sounder soul, she found for herself a monkish cell in the midst of a busy Rome". Fleury also said about Asella: "Her life was simple and regular, and in the midst of Rome led a life of perfect solitude". Jerome also cited Asella as an example and role model for young women, widows, and virgins, calling her "a flower of the Lord".

After leaving Rome for the East in August 385, Jerome wrote to Asella from on board ship at Ostia to refute the calumnies by which he had been assailed, especially as regards his intimacy with Paula and Eustochium.

In 405, the bishop and historian Palladius of Galatia visited Rome and met Asella, who was 70 years old. He called her "the gentlest of women", and reported that she was in charge of a community of nuns. Asella died c. 406; her feast day is December 6.

== Works cited ==
- Dunbar, Agnes B.C. (1901). A Dictionary of Saintly Women. Volume 1. London: George Bell & Sons, pp. 85-86
