= Paulina (wife of Pammachius) =

Late Roman aristocrat and philanthropist, who was the wife of Pammachius

- Died: c. 397; Rome
- Spouse: Pammachius
- Parent(s): Toxotius and Paula of Rome

Paulina (died c. 397) was a late Roman aristocrat and philanthropist, who was the wife of Pammachius and the daughter of Paula of Rome. Letters of condolence were written at her death by Paulinus of Nola and Jerome.

== Biography ==
Little is known about Paulina's early life. Her parents were Paula and Toxotius, both were from Roman noble families. They had five children: Toxotius, Blesilla, Paulina, Eustochium, and Rufina.

In 385, the same year her mother left for the East, Paulina married Pammachius, who was a Roman senator; he was also her mother's cousin. The couple lived in a domus on the site of what is now Santi Giovanni e Paolo al Celio in Rome. A Christian shrine was built within their home, however the date of construction can only be narrowed to 385–410, so it is unclear the extent to which Paulina may have been involved in its construction. In addition to the shrine, the house also featured murals of the Martyrdom of the St Crispo and it is likely that these were commissioned by Paulina. She is depicted in part of the mural with her arms outstretched in welcome, with a figure, possibly her sister Rufina, standing nearby.

== Death ==
Paulina died during the birth of her son in 397. After her death Pammachius inherited her property. He soon after dedicated himself to a charitable works. At her funeral feast, her husband invited a "large crowd of the poor and hungry" to share the banquet. Pammachius and his friend Fabiola established a xenodochium in Paulina's honor, which provided hospitality to travellers on the river Tiber.

Letters of condolence after Paulina's death were written to Pammachius, by Paulinus of Nola and Jerome. Bearing in mind that Paulina died in childbirth, Jerome's letter stresses that bearing children was a precursor to her adoption of a life of chastity and sanctity. He also wrote, in Epistle 66, discussing the alms which Pammachius dispensed, that: "Other husbands sprinkle violets, roses, lilies, and shining blossoms and alleviate the pain in their hearts by these good offices. Our Pammachius waters the sacred ashes and her venerable bones with balsams of alms."

== Historiography ==
The historian Paola Moretti interprets Paulina as a device used to portray some women as praiseworthy. Gunhild Vidén discusses Paulina's removal of her clothing after her conversion, as a depiction of her change from pleasure-seeking to a life of virtue.
