= San Girolamo della Carità =

Church of Saint Jerome of the Charity
- Church of Saint Jerome of the Archconfraternity of Charity
- Chiesa di San Girolamo della Carità
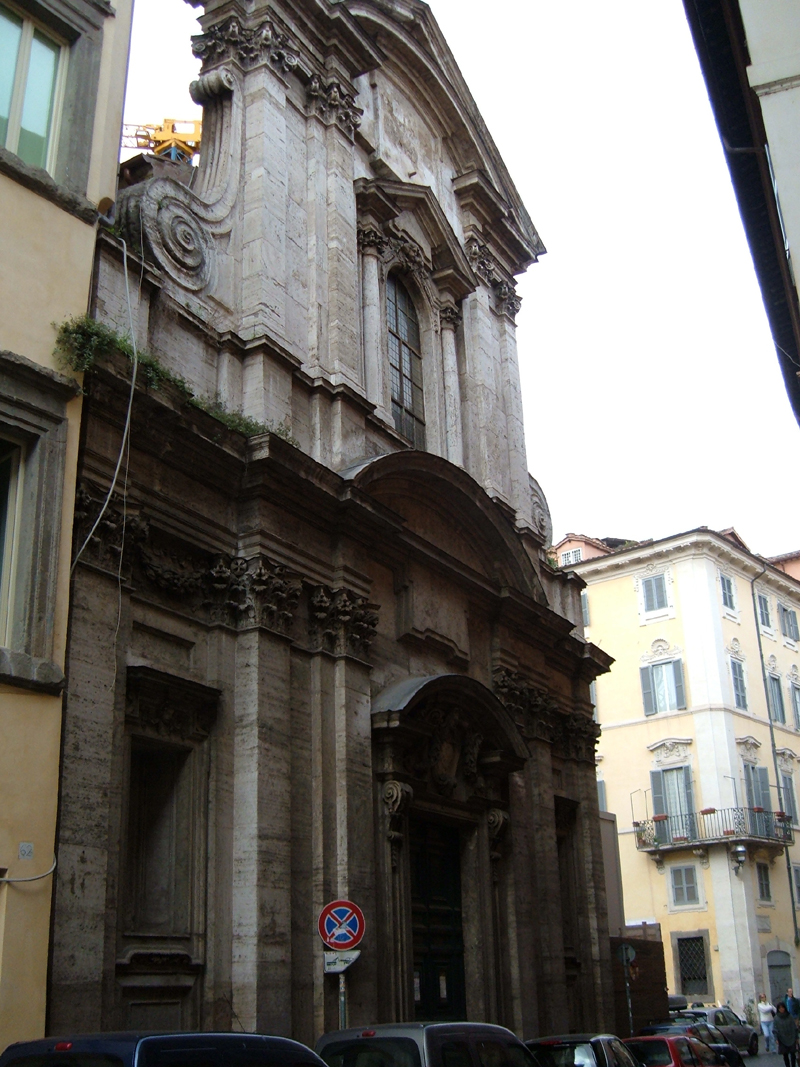
- Facade
- Click on the map for a fullscreen view
- 41°53′43″N 12°28′13″E
- Location: 62/a Via de Monserrato, Rome
- Country: Italy
- Language: Italian
- Denomination: Catholic
- Tradition: Roman Rite

History
- Status: Titular church
- Dedicated: Saint Jerome
- Other dedication: Saint Paula of Rome

Architecture
- Architect(s): Filippo Juvarra; Francesco Borromini
- Style: Baroque
- Completed: 1660

Administration
- Diocese: Rome

The Church of Saint Jerome of the Charity (Italian: Chiesa di San Girolamo della Carità) is a titular church in Rome, Italy, located near the Palazzo Farnese and Campo de' Fiori. This church was built on the site of the former home of Saint Paula of Rome, where she lived with her daughters, including Saint Blaesilla and Saint Eustochium, and where she welcomed the great Doctor of the Church, Saint Jerome. Also Saint Philip Neri lived in the place where the church stands today.

The history of this historic and religious site is also deeply marked by the founding of the Congregation of the Oratory by Saint Philip Neri in the 16th century. Since 1965, the church has been the seat of the Cardinal Diaconate of San Girolamo della Carità. It has been awaiting a Cardinal Deacon Protector since 2024. It is a subsidiary church of the parish of St. Lawrence in Damaso.

== History ==
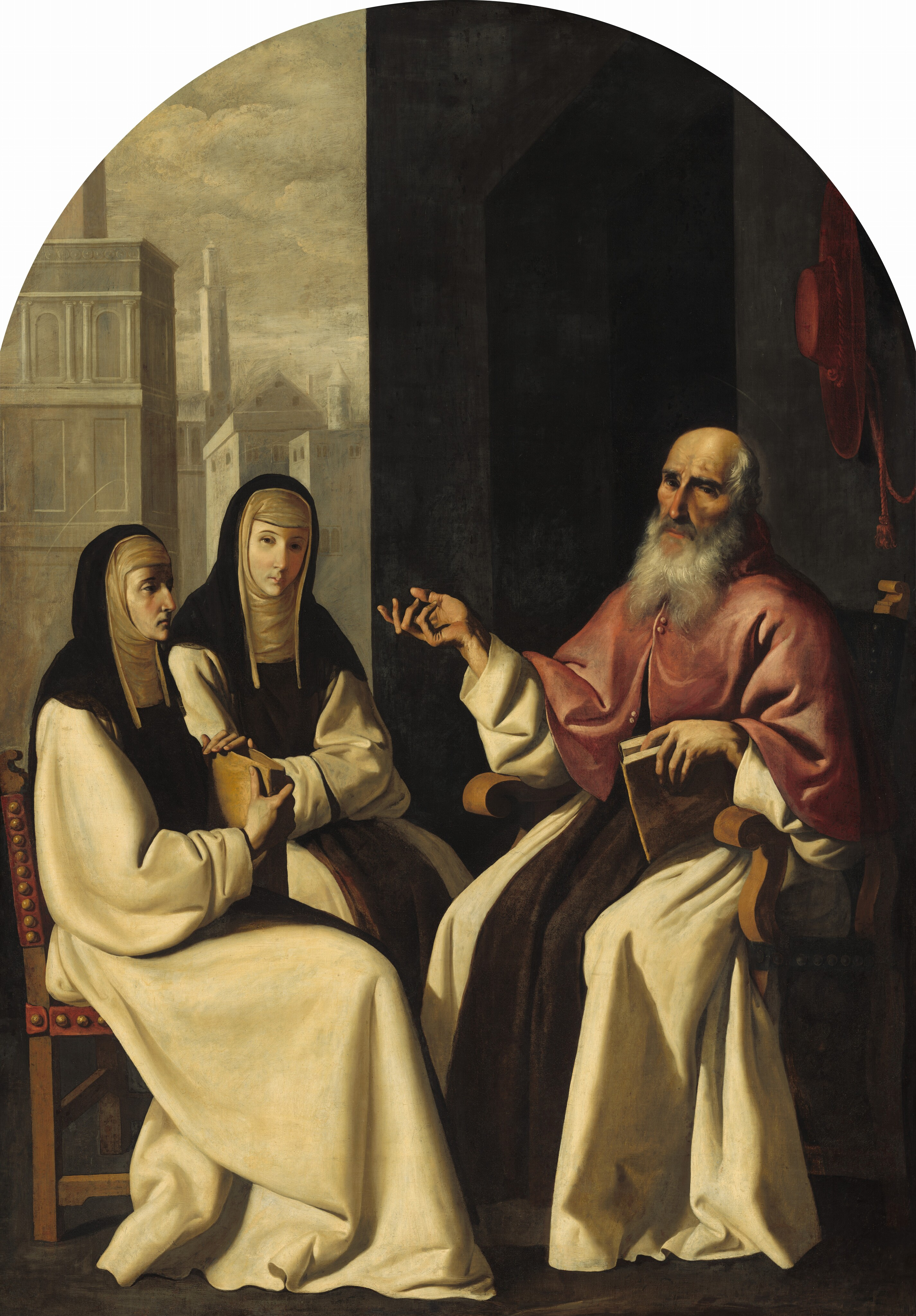
Saint Paula and her daughter Saint Eustochium with St. Jerome in Paula's domus in Rome

According to tradition, this is the site of the domus (town house) of the matron Saint Paula of Rome who hosted Saint Jerome when he served as secretary to Pope Damasus and while he translated the Bible into Latin (the Vulgate). Later it was transformed into a small church dedicated to him.

In 1419 the Franciscan Observants built a hospice with a chapel, which they replaced with a new church in 1508. In 1524 it was taken over by the Archconfraternity of Charity (Archconfraternita della Carità), founded by Giulio de' Medici (later Pope Clement VII) in 1519; a society of noblemen from Florence. Philip Neri lived in the hospice from 1551 to 1583. It served as a first meeting place for the Oratorians founded in 1561 before they were established as a Congregation in 1575 and, in the same year, given the Church of Saint Mary in the Little Valley.

A fire destroyed the hospice in 1631, damaging the church. In 1632 Cardinal Francesco Barberini, protector of the Archconfraternity, commissioned the architect Francesco Peparelli to renovate the hospice, which remained in operation until 1840, when the building was re-adapted into a convent connected to the church. The church, was rebuilt in 1657 by Domenico Castelli, with a Baroque façade by Carlo Rainaldi.

== Interior ==
The altarpiece for the high altar is a copy of Domenichino's The Last Communion of Saint Jerome (Domenichino). The original, commissioned for San Girolamo in 1612, is now in the Pinacoteca Vaticana.

The first chapel to the right (Cappella Spada), although originally assigned to Orazio Spada in 1575, was refurbished by Virgilio and Bernardino Spada in 1654-57. As a friend of Virgilio, the name of the Baroque architect Francesco Borromini has long been associated with the chapel but it has been argued that the overall design was probably directed by Virgilio Spada. The altar rail is by Gianlorenzo Bernini's pupil, Antonio Giorgetti.

The small but superbly finished Antamoro Chapel is dedicated to Saint Philip Neri. The chapel itself was designed by Filippo Juvarra, the only work of his in Rome, and constructed in 1708-1709. The decoration of the chapel with the back lit statue of The Ecstasy of S. Filippo Neri and two stucco reliefs in the ceiling was conceived by Juvarra in intimate cooperation with his close friend, the French sculptor Pierre Le Gros, who was responsible for carrying out the sculptural components.

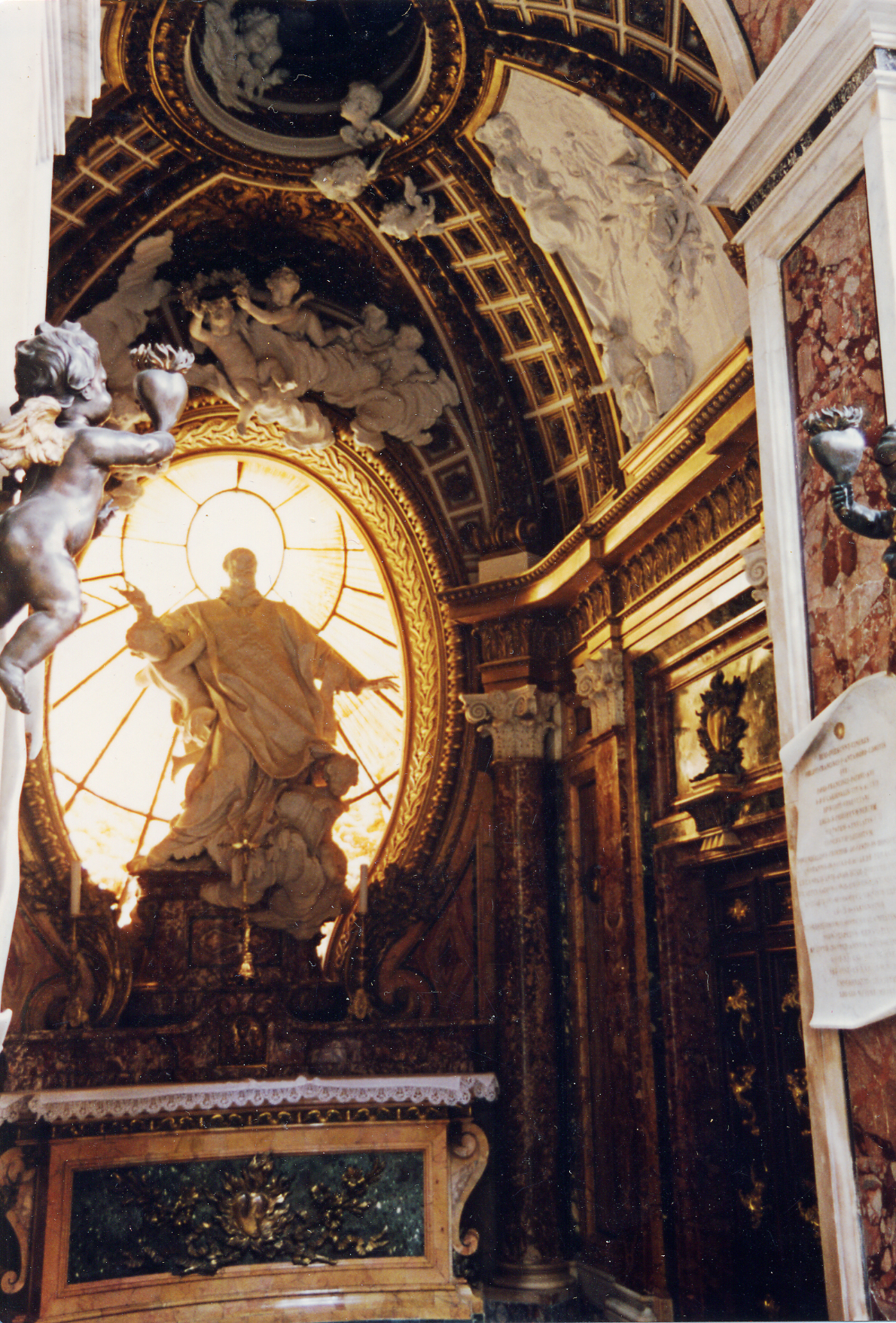
Cappella Antamoro by Juvarra and Le Gros

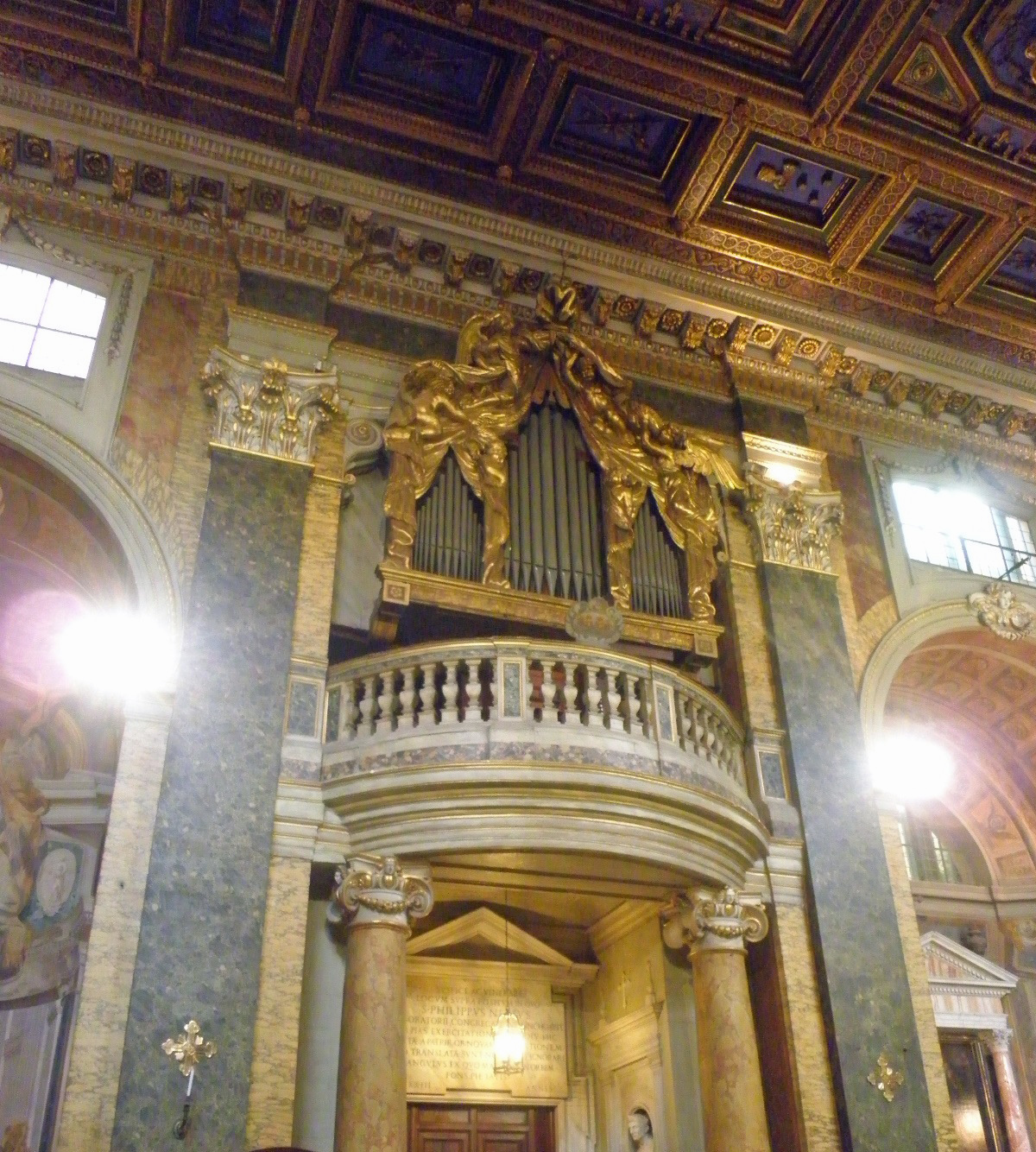
Pipe organ

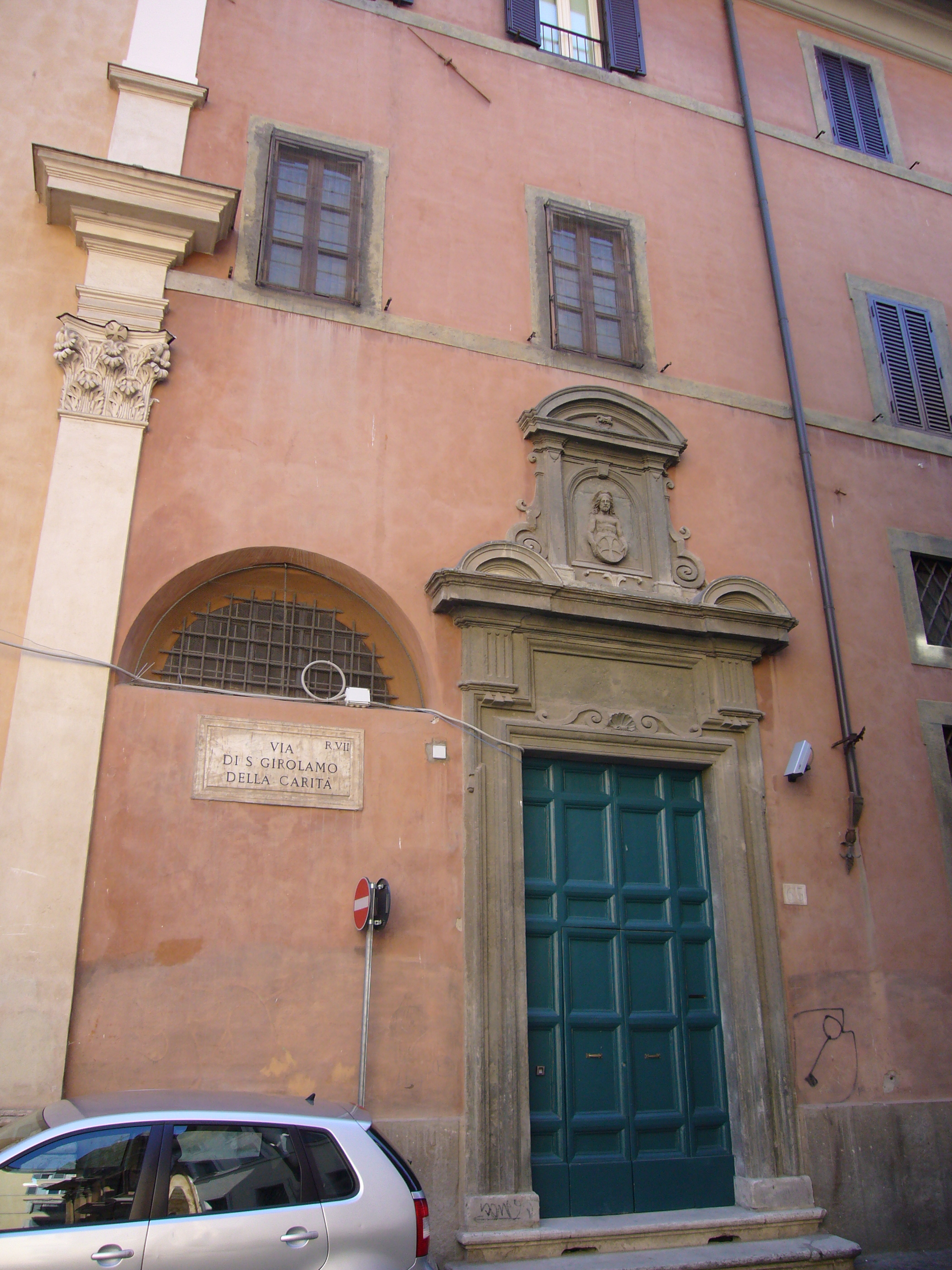
Side door

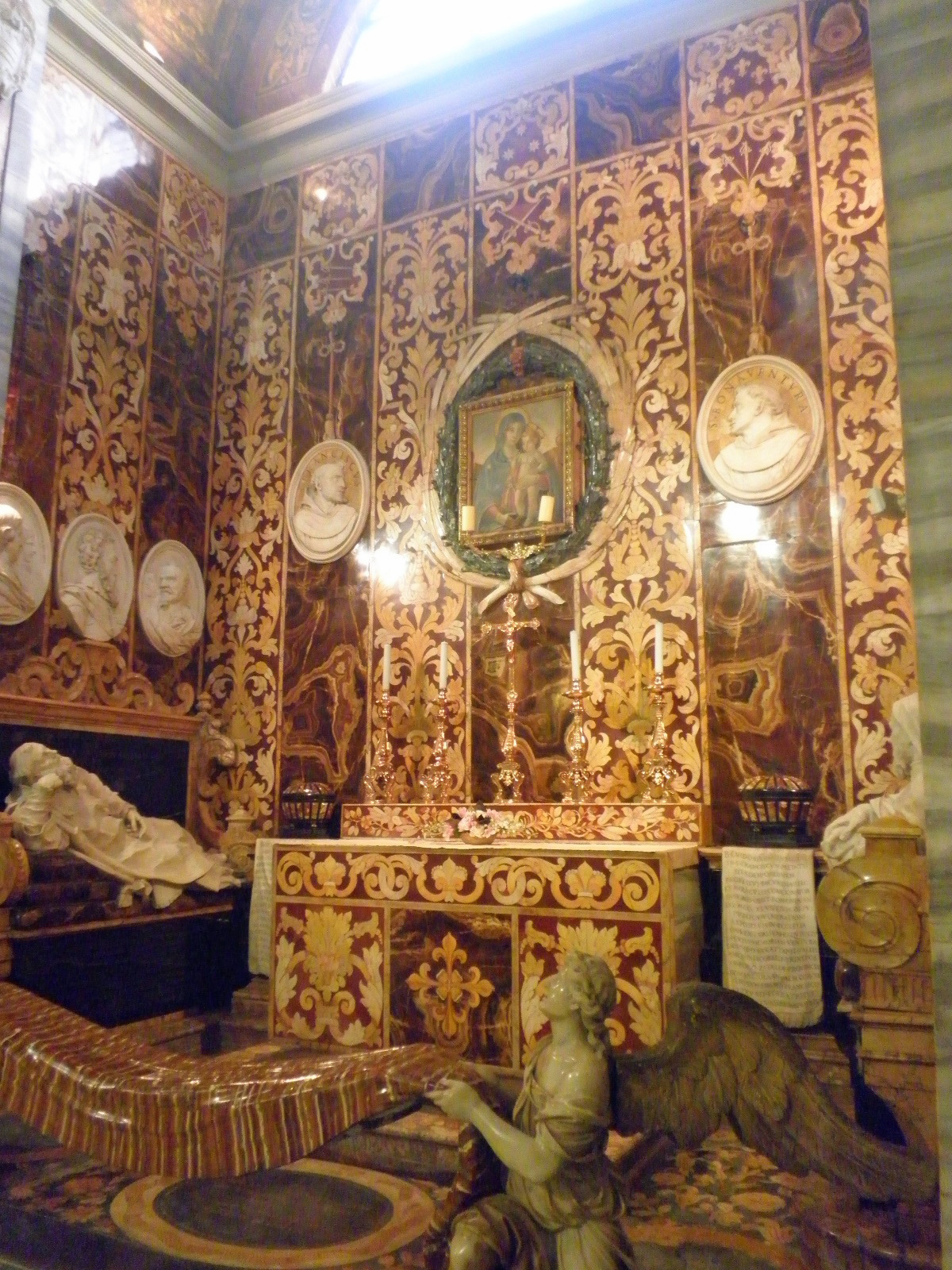
Cappella Spada

== Cardinal-Deacons ==
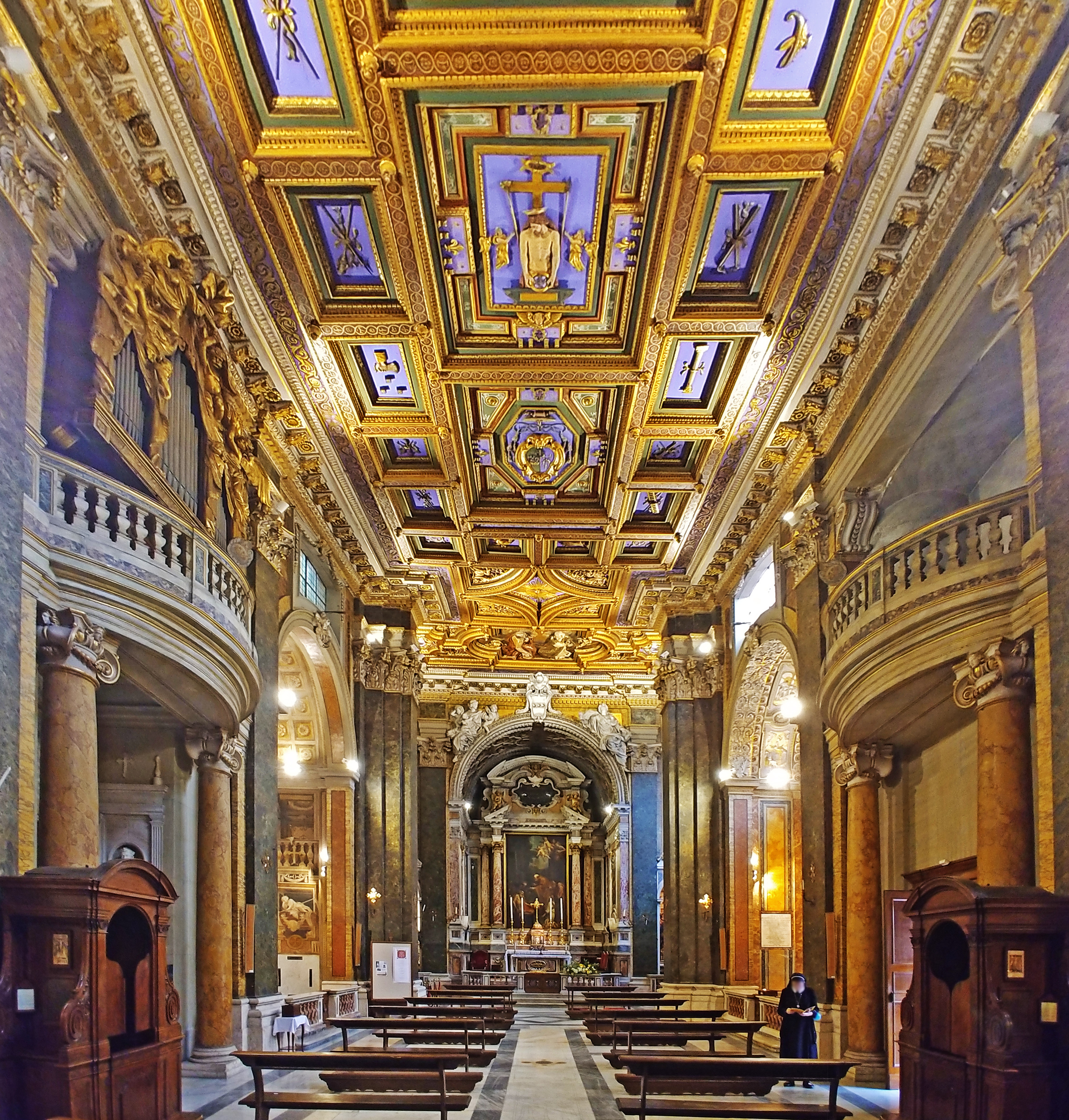
Church of Saint Jerome of the Charity

- Giulio Bevilacqua, C.O. (25 February 1965 – 6 May 1965)
- Antonio Riberi (26 June 1967 – 16 December 1967)
- Paolo Bertoli (30 April 1969 – 5 March 1973)
- Pietro Palazzini (12 December 1974 – 11 October 2000)
- Jorge María Mejía (21 February 2001 – 9 December 2014)
- Miguel Ángel Ayuso Guixot (5 October 2019 – 25 November 2024)
