= Saint Eusebius =

Saint Eusebius may refer to:

- Pope Eusebius, Pope 309–310.
- Eusebius of Cremona (died c. 423)
- Eusebius of Fano (died c. 526)
- Eusebius of Gaza (died c. 362)
- Eusebius of Rome (died c. 357), priest and martyr
- Eusebius of Samosata (died c. 380), bishop of Samosata
- Eusebius of Vercelli (c. 283–381), bishop of Vercelli
