= Giulio Bevilacqua =

His Eminence Giulio Bevilacqua C.O.
- Cardinal-Deacon of San Girolamo della Carità
- Church: Roman Catholic Church
- Appointed: 25 February 1965
- Term ended: 6 May 1965
- Successor: Antonio Riberi
- Previous post: Titular Archbishop of Gaudiaba (1965)

Orders
- Ordination: 13 June 1908 by Giacomo Maria Corna Pellegrini Spandre
- Consecration: 18 February 1965 by Luigi Morstabilini
- Created cardinal: 22 February 1965 by Pope Paul VI
- Rank: Cardinal-deacon

Personal details
- Born: Giulio Bevilacqua; 14 November 1881 Isola della Scala, Kingdom of Italy
- Died: 6 May 1965 (aged 83) Brescia, Italy
- Buried: S. Antonio della Pace, Brescia, Italy
- Education: University of Louvain
- Motto: Virtus in infirmitate
- Coat of arms

Giulio Bevilacqua, Orat (14 November 1881 – 6 May 1965) was an Italian prelate of the Catholic Church who devoted himself to pastoral work in Brescia and served as a military chaplain, known for his opposition to fascism. A few weeks before his death he was made an auxiliary bishop of Brescia and a cardinal. He was a teacher and spiritual confidant of Pope Paul VI.

== Biography ==
Giulio Bevilacqua was born in Isola della Scala to a family of merchants. He studied at the University of Louvain in Belgium and the seminary in Brescia, and later entered the Oratory of Saint Philip Neri.

Bevilacqua was ordained to the priesthood on 13 June 1908, and then did pastoral work in Brescia until 1914. During World War I, he served as a chaplain to the Italian Army and was captured by Austrian forces in 1916. Following his release in 1918, he resumed his ministry in Brescia, where he became the spiritual director and a personal friend of Giovanni Battista Montini, the future Pope Paul VI, while the latter was a student.

He was made an official of the Vatican Secretariat of State for his protection against Fascist threats and lived in the Vatican from 1928 to 1933. He also did pastoral work in Rome during this time. He then returned to Brescia. During World War II, served as a chaplain on an Italian hospital ship.

In 1964, he preached to Pope Paul and the small group of Church officials who were preparing to visit the Holy Land; he accompanied Pope Paul on that visit.

On 15 February 1965, Bevilacqua was appointed Auxiliary Bishop of Brescia and Titular Archbishop of Gaudiaba by Paul VI, in advance of his elevation to the College of Cardinals. He received his episcopal consecration on the following 18 February from Bishop Luigi Morstabilini, with Bishops Giuseppe Carraro and Carlo Manziana, Orat, serving as co-consecrators, in the basilica of Saints Faustus and Jovita.

Pope Paul created him Cardinal Deacon of San Girolamo della Carità in the consistory of 22 February of that year. By the special permission of the pope, Bevilacqua continued to serve as pastor of Sant'Antonio parish in Brescia. He assured his parishioners that he would also continue to wear a simple black cassock.

He died fifteen weeks later in Brescia on 6 May at the age of 83. He is buried in the church of Santa Maria della Pace.
