= Saint Fabiola =

Saint

Saint Fabiola of Rome
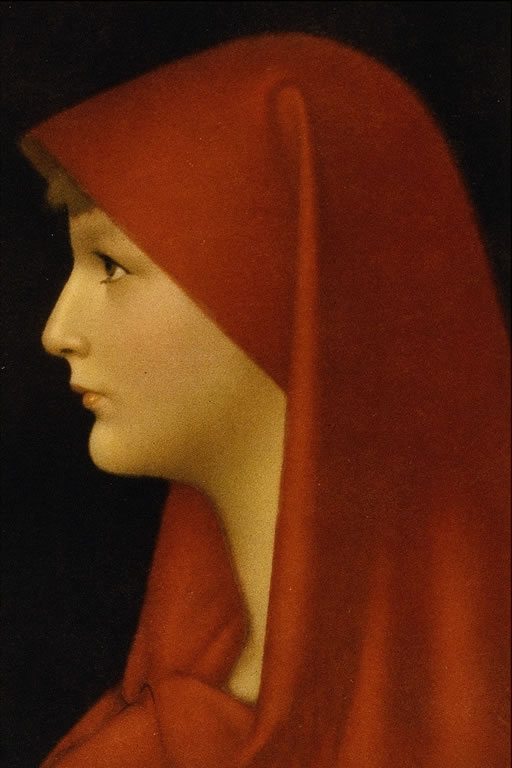
- Copy of Henner's portrait of St. Fabiola.
- Born: Rome, Western Roman Empire
- Died: 27 December 399 AD
- Venerated in: Eastern Orthodox Church; Roman Catholic Church
- Canonized: Pre-Congregation
- Feast: 27 December
- Patronage: Divorced people, difficult marriages, victims of abuse; adultery; unfaithfulness, widows; Hospice Movement

Fabiola (Italian: Santa Fabiola, also known as Fabiola of Rome) was a physician and Roman matron of rank of the company of noble Roman women who, under the influence of the Church Father Jerome, gave up all earthly pleasures and devoted herself to the practice of Christian asceticism and charitable work. She is venerated as a saint in the Eastern Orthodox Church and Roman Catholic church, being commemorated on 27 December.

== Early life ==
Fabiola belonged to the patrician Roman family of the gens Fabia. She had been married to a man who led so vicious a life that to live with him was impossible. She obtained a divorce from him according to Roman law and, contrary to the ordinances of the Christian Church, she entered upon a second union before the death of her first husband.

At the time of Jerome's stay at Rome (382–84), Fabiol was not one of the ascetic circle which gathered around him. It was only later that, upon the death of her second consort, she decided to enter upon a life of renunciation and labour for others. On the day before Easter, following the death of her second consort, she appeared before the gates of the Lateran basilica, dressed in penitential garb, and did public penance for her sin, which made a great impression upon the Christian population of Rome. The pope received her formally again into full communion with the church.

== Conversion to Christianity and later life ==
Fabiola now renounced all that the world had to offer her, and devoted her immense wealth to the needs of the poor and the sick. She erected a fine hospital at Rome, and waited on the inmates herself, and treated citizens rejected from society due to their "loathsome diseases". Besides this she gave large sums to the churches and religious communities at Rome and other places in Italy. All her interests were centered on the needs of the church and the care of the poor and suffering.

In 395 she went to Bethlehem, where she lived in the hospice of the convent directed by Paula of Rome and applied herself, under the direction of Jerome, with the greatest zeal to the study and contemplation of the scriptures and to ascetic exercises. An incursion of the Huns into the eastern provinces of the empire and the quarrel which broke out between Jerome and John II, Bishop of Jerusalem respecting the teachings of Origen made residence in Bethlehem unpleasant for her and she returned to Rome.

She remained, however, in correspondence with Jerome, who at her request wrote a treatise on the priesthood of Aaron and the priestly dress. At Rome, Fabiola united with the former senator Pammachius in carrying out a great charitable undertaking; together they erected at Portus a large hospice for pilgrims coming to Rome. Fabiola also continued her usual personal labours in aid of the poor and sick until her death on 27 December of 399 or 400. Although Fabiola's practice of medicine was pragmatic in application, her legacy illustrates the involvement of early Christian women in the field of medicine.

The Fabiola with whom the church father Augustine of Hippo was in correspondence was possibly a daughter of the saint Fabiola.

== Veneration ==
Her funeral was a wonderful manifestation of the gratitude and veneration with which she was regarded by the Roman populace. Jerome wrote a eulogistic memoir of Fabiola in a letter to her relative Oceanus.

She is venerated as a saint in the Eastern Orthodox Church and Roman Catholic church, with a feast day on 27 December

== Legacy ==
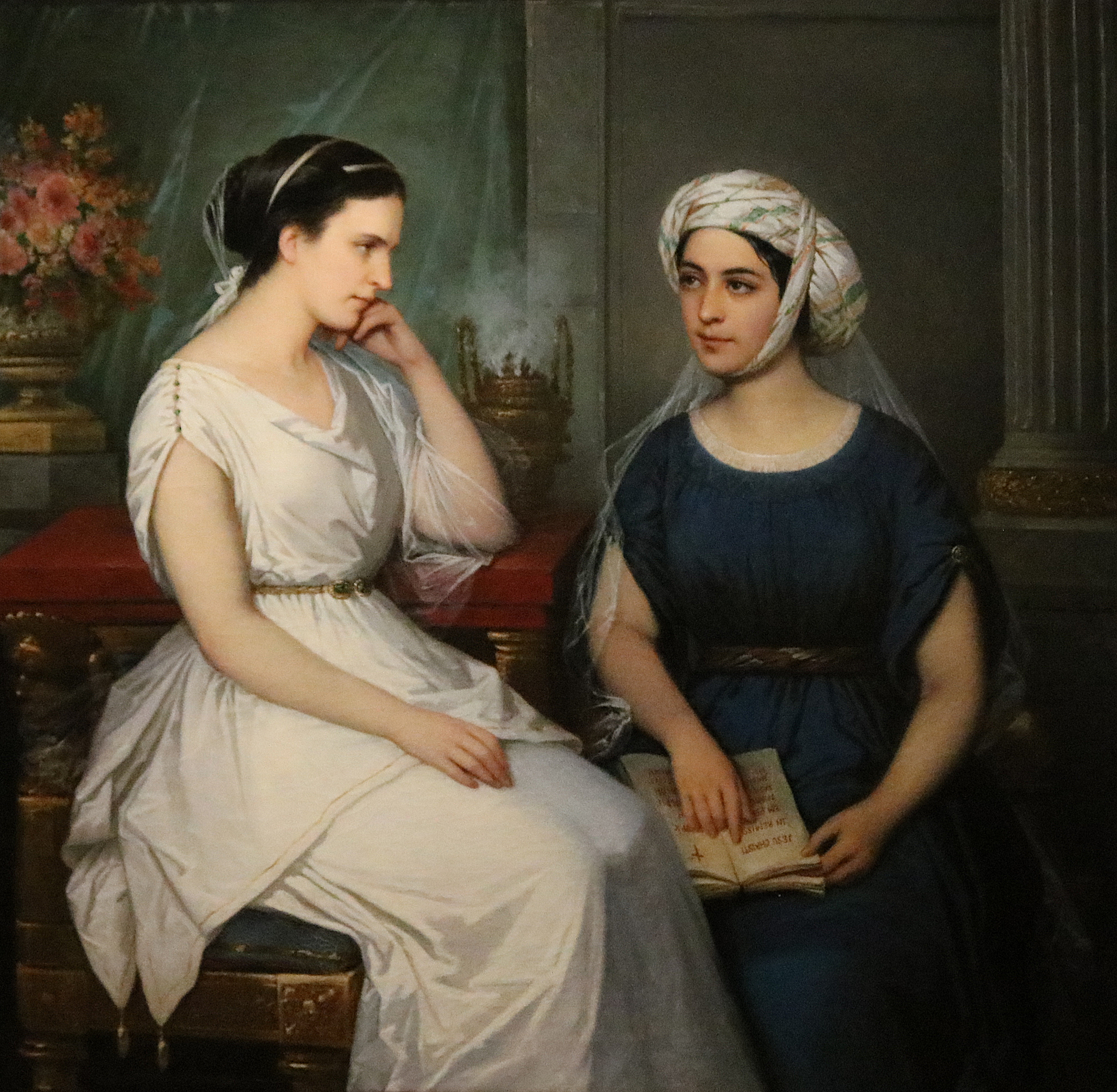
Fabiola and Syra, 1859, by Amanda Fougère, painting inspired by Wiseman's novel

Cardinal Wiseman immortalised her in his novel, Fabiola. Wiseman wrote Fabiola in part as an answer to the vigorously anti-Catholic book Hypatia (1853) by Charles Kingsley. The novel was mainly intended to aid the embattled Roman Catholic minority in England.

Jean-Jacques Henner painted his portrait of Fabiola (in a classical Roman profile) in 1885; the original of this idealized portrayal of the saint was lost in 1912 but the image was copied by artists around the globe in the following century. In 2008, contemporary artist Francis Alÿs mounted a traveling exhibition of over 300 of these copies from his own collection. The exhibition first ran at the Hispanic Society of America in New York City, then the LACMA in Los Angeles, going on to the National Portrait Gallery in London from May to September 2009. The collection, grown to include 514 copies of the portrait, was later on show at the Byzantine Fresco Chapel of the Menil Collection in Houston from May 21, 2016, to May 13, 2018.
