= Marcella of Rome =

Christian saint (325–410)

Saint Marcella
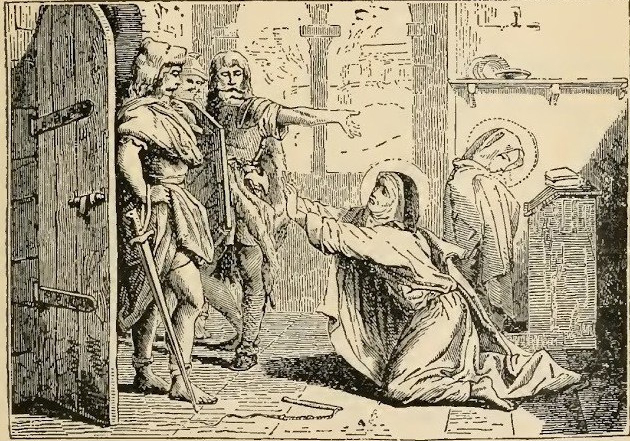
- Saint Marcella pleading with the Goths
- Born: 325; Rome, Italia, Roman Empire
- Died: 410; Rome, Italia, Western Roman Empire
- Venerated in: Catholic Church; Orthodox Church; Anglican Communion
- Feast: January 31

Marcella (325–410) is a saint in the Catholic and Eastern Orthodox churches as well as the Anglican Communion. She was a Christian ascetic in the Western Roman Empire.

The Oxford Dictionary of the Christian Church reports, "She suffered bodily ill-treatment at the hands of the Goths when they captured Rome in 410 and died from its effects." She is commemorated on 31 January.

== Biography ==
She came from a noble family that lived in a palace on the Aventine Hill. Growing up in Rome, she was influenced by her pious mother, Albina, an educated, wealthy, and benevolent woman. Marcella was but a child when the exiled bishop Athanasius of Alexandria visited Rome. According to Christine Schenk, she "gathered women to study Scripture and pray in her aristocratic home on the Aventine Hill fully 40 years before Jerome arrived in Rome. After Jerome returned to Jerusalem, Rome's priests consulted Marcella to clarify biblical texts. She also engaged in public debate over the Originist [sic] controversy."

After her husband's early death, Marcella decided to devote the rest of her life to charity, prayer, and mortification of the flesh. According to Butler, "Having lost her husband in the seventh month of her marriage, she rejected the suit of Cerealis the consul, uncle of Gallus Cæsar, and resolved to imitate the lives of the ascetics of the East. She abstained from wine and flesh, employed all her time in pious reading, prayer, and visiting the churches of the apostles and martyrs, and never spoke with any man alone."

Pammachius, a close friend and correspondent of Jerome, was her cousin. He was also a cousin of Paula of Rome. Pammachius married Paula's second daughter, Paulina. Marcella's palatial home became a center of Christian activity. She and her mother, Albina, formed a religious women's group in their home, inspired by Eastern monastic traditions. Paula's third daughter, Eustochium, was part of this group. The house is supposed to have stood near the present site of Santa Sabina and to have become a refuge for weary pilgrims and the poor. An associate of Marcella, Lea, was also a wealthy widow and supported the house that Marcella ran.

In 382, Pope Damasus I called Jerome to Rome, where he became the pope's confidential secretary. Damasus arranged lodging for him at Marcella's hospitality house. Jerome gave readings and lectures to Marcella's community and friends. It was at the home of Marcella that Jerome first met Paula.

When Paula and her daughter Eustochium left Rome for the Holy Land, they asked Marcella to join them, but she chose to remain in Rome to tend to her growing community. She and her student Principia moved from the palace to a smaller house on the Aventine.

When the Visigoths sacked Rome in 410, the 85-year-old Marcella was brutalized. Convinced that she had hidden treasure, which she had long before distributed among the poor, she was scourged and beaten with cudgels. Other soldiers arrived who had "some reverence for holy things". They escorted Marcella and Principia to the Basilica of Saint Paul Outside the Walls, one of those which had been named by Alaric as a sanctuary for all who chose to take advantage of it.

Jerome detailed the incident in a letter to a woman named Principia who had been with Marcella during the sack.

When the soldiers entered [Marcella's house] she is said to have received them without any look of alarm; and when they asked her for gold she pointed to her coarse dress to show them that she had no buried treasure. However they would not believe in her self-chosen poverty, but scourged her and beat her with cudgels. She is said to have felt no pain but to have thrown herself at their feet and to have pleaded with tears for you [Principia], that you might not be taken from her, or owing to your youth have to endure what she as an old woman had no occasion to fear. Christ softened their hard hearts and even among bloodstained swords natural affection asserted its rights. The barbarians conveyed both you and her to the basilica of the apostle Paul, that you might find there either a place of safety or, if not that, at least a tomb.

Exhausted and injured, Marcella died of her injuries a few days later.

== Correspondence from Jerome ==
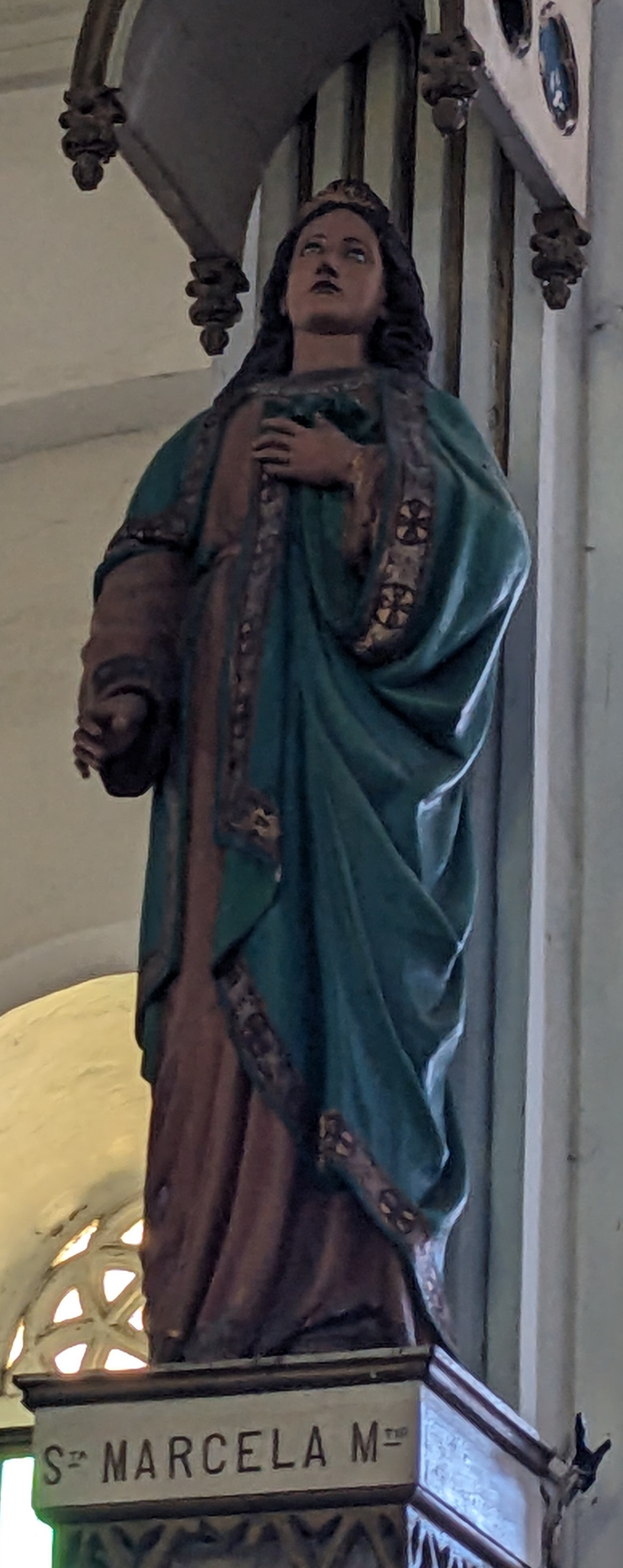
Statue of Marcella in Molo Church, Philippines

In modern collections of Jerome's letters, we find many letters to Marcella (Letters 23, 25, 26, 29, 34, 127). Almost a third of all the extant letters from Jerome were addressed to women. Thomas Lawler, notes, “Marcella is by far the woman most frequently addressed, quite likely because of her leading position in that celebrated circle of religious-minded women that met at her house on the Aventine.” Most of what we know about Marcella is from the letters of Jerome, most famously his letter 127 to Principia. It was written on the occasion of Marcella's death, paying tribute to her life and consoling her beloved student. In it, he says the following about his relationship with Marcella:

As in those days my name was held in some renown as that of a student of the Scriptures, she never came to see me without asking me some questions about them, nor would she rest content at once, but on the contrary would dispute them; this, however, was not for the sake of argument, but to learn by questioning the answers to such objections might, as she saw, be raised. How much virtue and intellect, how much holiness and purity I found in her I am afraid to say, both lest I may exceed the bounds of men's belief and lest I may increase your sorrow by reminding you of the blessings you have lost. This only will I say, that whatever I had gathered together by long study, and by constant meditation made part of my nature, she tasted, she learned and made her own.

== Legacy ==
Perhaps because she did not live long after being scourged, Marcella was included in the Roman Martyrology. Her feast day in the west is January 31.

Marcella of Rome has a Lesser Feast on The Calendar of the Church Year of the Episcopal Church on January 31.

The artwork The Dinner Party by Judy Chicago features a place setting for Marcella.
