= Blaesilla =

Roman saint (364–384)

Saint Blaesilla
- Born: 364; Rome
- Died: 384 (aged 19–20)
- Venerated in: Catholic Church; Orthodox Church
- Feast: 22 January
- Influences: Saint Jerome

Blaesilla, also known as Blesilla (364–384), was a Roman widow and disciple of Jerome. She was born into a wealthy senatorial family in Rome, the eldest daughter of Paula of Rome and sister of Eustochium, who were members of a group of wealthy Christian women who followed the teachings of Jerome. Blaesilla was widowed at the age of 18; at first, she enjoyed her freedom as a widow, but after a life-threatening fever, became "a changed woman" and a severe ascetic, practicing fasting as a spiritual discipline. Her fasts dramatically weakened her, and she died within four months, at the age of 20.

Blaesilla's death caused "bitter controversy" in Rome; many Romans blamed Jerome for her death and demanded that he be removed from Rome. Eventually, Jerome left Rome, with Blaesilla's mother and sister, to live as an ascetic in the Holy Land. Most of the knowledge about Blaesilla's life comes from the writings of Jerome, in which he described her piety and virtue. She also inspired Jerome to translate the book of Ecclesiastes. Modern writers and researchers have connected Blaesilla with the eating disorder anorexia nervosa; she has been called "this ancient woman who starved herself in death in the name of Christ" and "the first victim of anorexia nervosa, described in the literature", and has been compared to modern patients with the disorder.

== Life ==
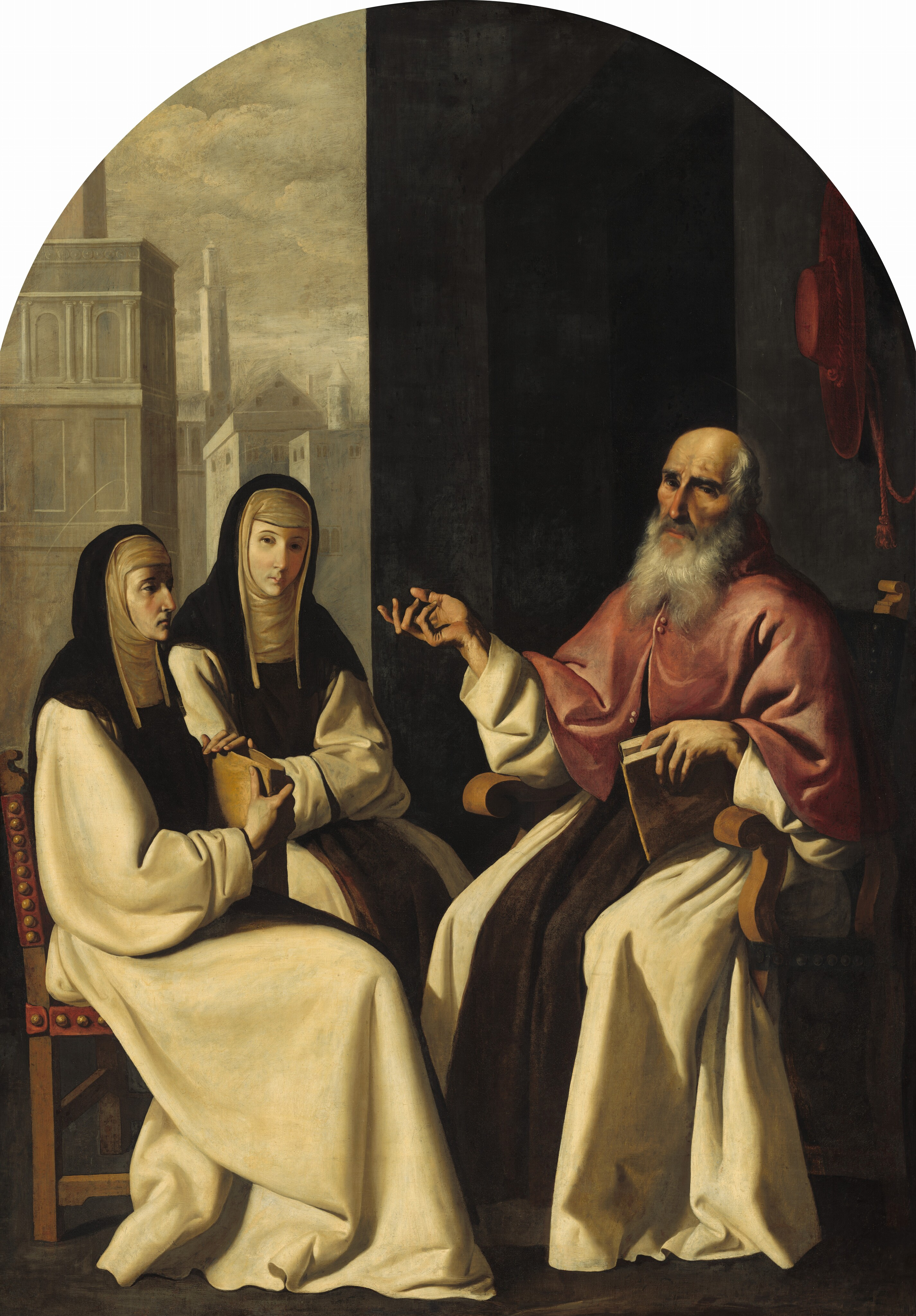
Saint Jerome, Saint Paula, and Saint Eustochium. Francisco de Zurbarán, National Gallery of Art in Washington

If it were not for the writings of Jerome, in which he described her piety and virtue, we would know very little about Blaesilla.

Blaesilla was born in Rome in 364, into a wealthy aristocratic family, the eldest daughter of Paula of Rome, the widow of Toxotius, a wealthy Roman senator. Toxotius' brother was a former vicarius of Rome and proconsul of Africa. Blaesilla had three sisters, one of which was Eustochium. Both Paula and Eustochium were part of "the vigorous Christian community" in Rome during the 4th century that was made up of wealthy women like Paula and Asella, and advised by Jerome.

Blaesilla was described as "a beautiful, talented young girl who loved the merry life of aristocratic Rome"; she enjoyed the theater, dinner parties, and socializing with other young people. When Blaesilla was 18, she married Furius, a son of Titiana, who was devoutly Christian like Blaesilla's mother. Blaesilla's husband died seven months after they were married, leaving her a wealthy widow. She mourned his death, but as historian Joyce E. Salisbury stated, Blaesilla was too young to "forego the exciting life she loved", living as other young widows did at the time, lavishly spending her time and money on her dress, appearance, and parties, and enjoying her freedom as a widow. Jerome, who advocated asceticism and extreme fasting as a spiritual practice because he believed that it helped his followers control their flesh and focus more on God, chastised her for "her frivolous life".

Shortly after her husband's death, Blaesilla became ill with a fever; she recovered and became "a changed woman". Writer Joan Carroll Cruz said that Blaesilla had "yield[ed] to the promptings of grace" and chose to spend "the rest of her short life in great austerity". She studied scripture, learned to speak Greek with a perfect accent, learned Hebrew in a few months, carried books with her wherever she went, and demanded that Jerome write commentaries for her to study. Jerome, speaking about her intellectual talent, said: "Who can recall without a sigh the earnestness of her prayers, the brilliancy of her conversation, the tenacity of her memory, and the quickness of her intellect?"

Blaesilla became an ascetic, wearing plain clothes and participating in extreme fasts that dramatically weakened her. Historian John Matthews conjectured that Blaesilla's behavior was due to depression and a response to a life-threatening illness. Her family grew alarmed about her declining health. She was not able to withstand the demands that her asceticism had on her body, and she died within four months, in 384, at the age of 20.

== Reactions to her death ==
=== Contemporary reactions ===
According to Jerome in one of his letters to Paula, in which he described Blaesilla's death, Paula became so overwhelmed by grief during Blaesilla's funeral that she collapsed during the procession and had to be taken away unconscious. Jerome, in his attempt to console her, proclaimed Blaesilla "the victor in the struggle against Satan".

Historians Finley Hooper and Matthew Schwartz reported that Blaesilla's death caused "bitter controversy" in Rome. Salisbury reported that many in Rome were outraged at Blaesilla's premature death and blamed Jerome. They accused him for the demise of the lively young woman, and his insistence to Paula that Blaesilla should not be mourned and hid complaints that her grief was excessive, were seen as heartless, polarising Roman opinion against him. Romans saw that she had been killed by fasting, and demanded that monks be expelled from Rome.

While in Rome, Jerome served as secretary to Pope Damasus I. Jerome's criticism of the Roman clergy of Rome brought increased hostility towards against him from the clergy and their supporters. Damasus died in December 384. Shortly after the pope's death, an inquiry was brought questioning the relationship between Jerome and Paula and he was forced to leave his position. Jerome left Rome for Antioch, before heading for Jerusalem. Paula and Blaesilla's younger sister Eustochium soon followed; they did not seem to blame him for Blaesilla's death but were certain that "she had died in a state of grace". Jerome spent the last 34 years of his life living as an ascetic supported by Paula, who founded a double monastery for him and herself at Bethlehem.

=== Modern criticism of Jerome ===
Hooper and Schwartz were critical of Jerome, stating that his beliefs about asceticism and monasticism demonstrated an attitude that would prevail in Christianity for centuries.

=== Modern diagnose: anorexia ===
Paula's collapsing during Blaesilla's funeral procession has been analysed by historian John Matthews as caused by Paula's own asceticism, and that she had been weakened by the lack of food.

Modern writers and researchers have connected Blaesilla with the eating disorder anorexia nervosa. Salisbury called Blaesilla "this ancient woman who starved herself to death in the name of Christ", and writer Leonard Shlain stated that she "died from anorexia". Researchers Martine Docx and Paul Govaert called Blaesilla "probably the first recorded case of death due to anorexia" and "the first victim of anorexia nervosa, described in the literature". They compared modern patients with anorexia to religious ascetics of the past like Blaesilla, stating that the "refusal of food both in antiquity and in modern society by the anorexic patient is an extreme form of self-discipline to pursue a new, better identity". They also stated that the refusal of food offered ascetics like Blaesilla "a spiritual transcendence", while the goal for modern patients was the pursuit of the "perfect body". They suggested that Blaesilla's motivation might also have included a desire to earn the love and approval of Jerome, her mother, and her sister, much like the way in which modern patients become anorexic to earn the love and approval of their families and society.

== Legacy and veneration ==
Cruz reported that Jerome translated the book of Ecclesiastes at Blaesilla's request.

Blaesilla's feast day is 22 January.
