= Eustochius =

Eustochius (also Eustachius) was the fifth bishop of Tours from 443 to 461. He was succeeded by his close relative, Saint Perpetuus. His extremely rare name suggests a possible connection to Saint Eustochium. T. S. M. Mommaerts and D. H. Kelley make the point that his father was Eustochium's brother, Julius Toxotius the Younger, and that his maternal grandfather was Publius Ceionius Caecina Albinus, of the Ceionii Volusiani.

== Biography ==
Eustochius was descended from an illustrious family of Auvergne, and, according to Gregory of Tours, was a man of eminent virtue. In 444 he succeeded Brice as Bishop of Tours. He participated in the Council of Angers in 453, and had a principal share in drawing up the regulations made in that council concerning discipline. He built a church in Tours and deposited there relics of Gervasius and Protasius.

He died in 461, and was buried in the church built by Saint Brice over the tomb of Saint Martin. He is commemorated on September 19.

== Sources ==
- T. S. M. Mommaerts and D. H. Kelley, The Anicii of Gaul and Rome, in Fifth-century Gaul: a Crisis of Identity?, ed. by John Drinkwater and Hugh Elton, (Cambridge University Press, Cambridge & New York, 1992), 120–121.
