= Paula of Rome =

Ancient Roman saint

Saint Paula
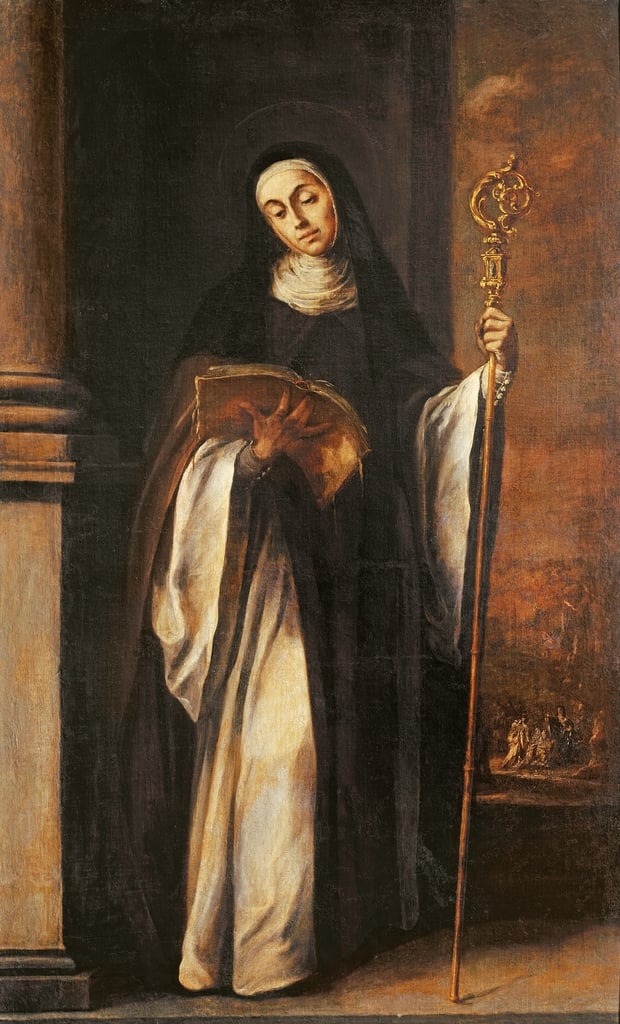
- Saint Paula (or An Abbess). Painting of Juan de Valdés Leal (1622–1690) in Musée de Tessé, Le Mans, France.

Patroness of the Order of Saint Jerome
- Born: 5 May 347; Rome, Italia, Roman Empire
- Died: 26 January 404; Bethlehem, Palaestina Prima, Eastern Roman Empire
- Venerated in: Catholic Church; Eastern Orthodox Church; Anglican Communion
- Major shrine: Church of Saint Jerome of the Charity and Church of Santa Paola Romana in Rome, Italy
- Feast: January 26; September 28
- Attributes: Depicted as a Hieronymite abbess with a book; depicted as a pilgrim, often with Jerome and Eustochium; depicted prostrate before the cave at Bethlehem; depicted embarking in a ship, while a child calls from the shore; weeping over her children; with the instruments of the Passion; holding a scroll with Saint Jerome's epistle Cogite me Paula; with a book and a black veil fringed with gold; or with a sponge in her hand.
- Patronage: Widows; Order of Saint Jerome monks and nuns
- Influences: Saint Jerome, Saint Marcella
- Influenced: Saint Jerome, Saint Blaesilla, Saint Eustochium
- Tradition or genre: Desert Mothers

Paula of Rome (AD 347–404) was an ancient Roman Christian saint and early Desert Mother. A member of one of the richest senatorial families which claimed descent from Agamemnon, Paula was the daughter of Blesilla and Rogatus, from the great clan of the noble Furii Camilli. At the age of 16, Paula was married to the nobleman Toxotius, with whom she had four daughters, Saint Blaesilla, Paulina, Saint Eustochium, and Rufina. She also had a boy, also named Toxotius. She was a disciple of Saint Jerome, Doctor of the Church, and was one of the first abbesses of a convent of nuns.

== Early life ==
Information about Paula's early life is recorded by Saint Jerome. In his Letter 108, he states that she had led a luxurious life and held a great status in Rome. She dressed in silks, and had been carried about the city by her eunuch slaves. According to tradition, the current Church of Saint Jerome of the Charity in Rome, Italy, is the site of the former domus (town house) of the matron Paula where she hosted Jerome when he served as secretary to Pope Damasus and while he translated the Bible into Latin (the Vulgate).

== Entering the religious life ==
At the age of 32, Paula was widowed. She continued to dedicate herself to her family, but became more interested in religion as time went on.

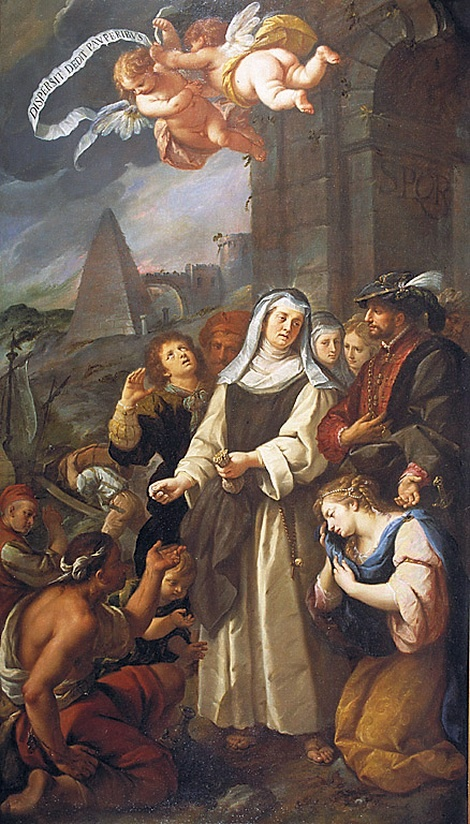
The alms of Saint Paula of Rome, 17th century. Painting by Giuseppe Nuvolone

Through the influence of Saint Marcella and her group, Paula became an enthusiastic member of this semi-monastic group of women. She met and learned from Paulinus, bishop of Antioch and Epiphanius, bishop of Salamis. In 382, she met Jerome, who had come to Rome with Epiphanius and Paulinus of Antioch. Born in Dalmatia, Jerome had studied in Rome as a youth and had traveled to Germany and Aquileia, and for some years had lived in the East as an ascetic and scholar.

While on pilgrimage to the Holy Land and Egypt, with Jerome and her daughter, Eustochium, she visited monks and other ascetics including Paulinus of Nola, Melania the Elder, Rufinus of Aquileia and Isidore the Confessor. She then settled in Bethlehem and established a monastery for men and a convent for women and a hostel for pilgrims. The monks' monastery was run by men with Jerome living and writing in one of its cells and Paula was abbess of the nuns.

== Family ==
Paula married her daughter, Paulina (d. 395), to the senator Pammachius; Blesilla soon became a widow and died in 384. Of her two other daughters, Rufina died in 386, and Eustochium accompanied her mother to the Orient where she died in 419. Eustochium succeeded Paula as abbess and Paula the Younger (Paula's granddaughter) succeeded Eustochium. Paula's son, Toxotius, at first not a Christian, but baptized in 385, married in 389 Laeta, daughter of the pagan priest Albinus. Of this marriage was born Paula the Younger, who in 404 rejoined Eustochium in the Holy Land and in 420 closed the eyes of Jerome. These are the names which recur frequently in the letters of Jerome, where they are inseparable from that of Paula. It has been argued that Eustochius of Tours was the brother of Paula the Younger and the son of Toxotius.

== Pilgrimage ==
A year after the death of her husband, Paula pursued a pilgrimage to tour all of the holy sites, traveling with large entourages of both men and women including her daughter Eustochium and Jerome himself. Paula could undertake this voyage due to her widow status which left her a significant fortune, and the important fact that she had given birth to a healthy male heir and that two of her daughters had married aristocrats, allowing her exemption from remarriage and giving her what a researcher called "ascetic freedom". Her travels are documented by Jerome in his later writing addressed to Eustochium which discusses how Paula participated in the environments they toured. He discusses that Paula exemplified an intimate and emotional connection with the sights, experiencing visual vividness of biblical events at each locale. Concluding her journey, Paula decided to remain in Bethlehem to develop a monastery and spiritual retreat with Jerome.

== Monastery establishment ==
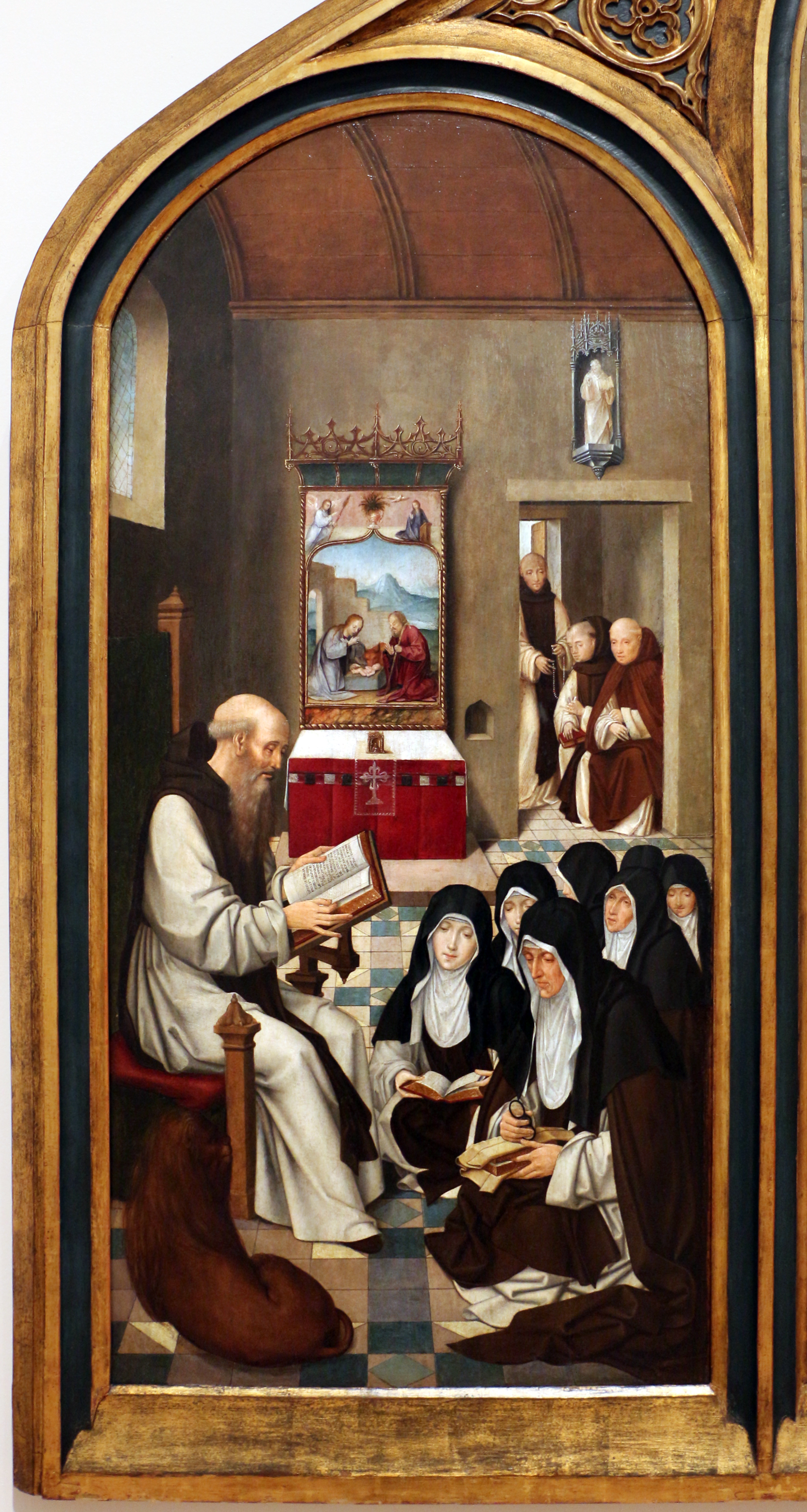
Religious profession of Saint Paula, 16th century. Painting of Frei Carlos in National Museum of Ancient Art, Lisbon, Portugal.

Once settled in Bethlehem, Paula and Jerome built a double monastery including one for Paula and her nuns and another for Jerome and his monks. Paula added a roadside hostel, which apparently only served to accommodate aristocratic pilgrims, who also stayed at Jerome's strictly male monastery. The financial strain of her hospitality eventually exhausted Paula's entire wealth, leaving her daughter with a mountain of debts at her death. The new monastic establishment took three years to complete and was primarily sourced by Paula who, during this time of construction, stayed at the hostel of another monastery in Bethlehem. It is interesting to notice the very similar contemporary establishment of a double monastery on the Mount of Olives by the very wealthy and widowed aristocratic lady Melania, comprising a convent for herself and a monastery built in honour of her spiritual mentor and companion, Rufinus.

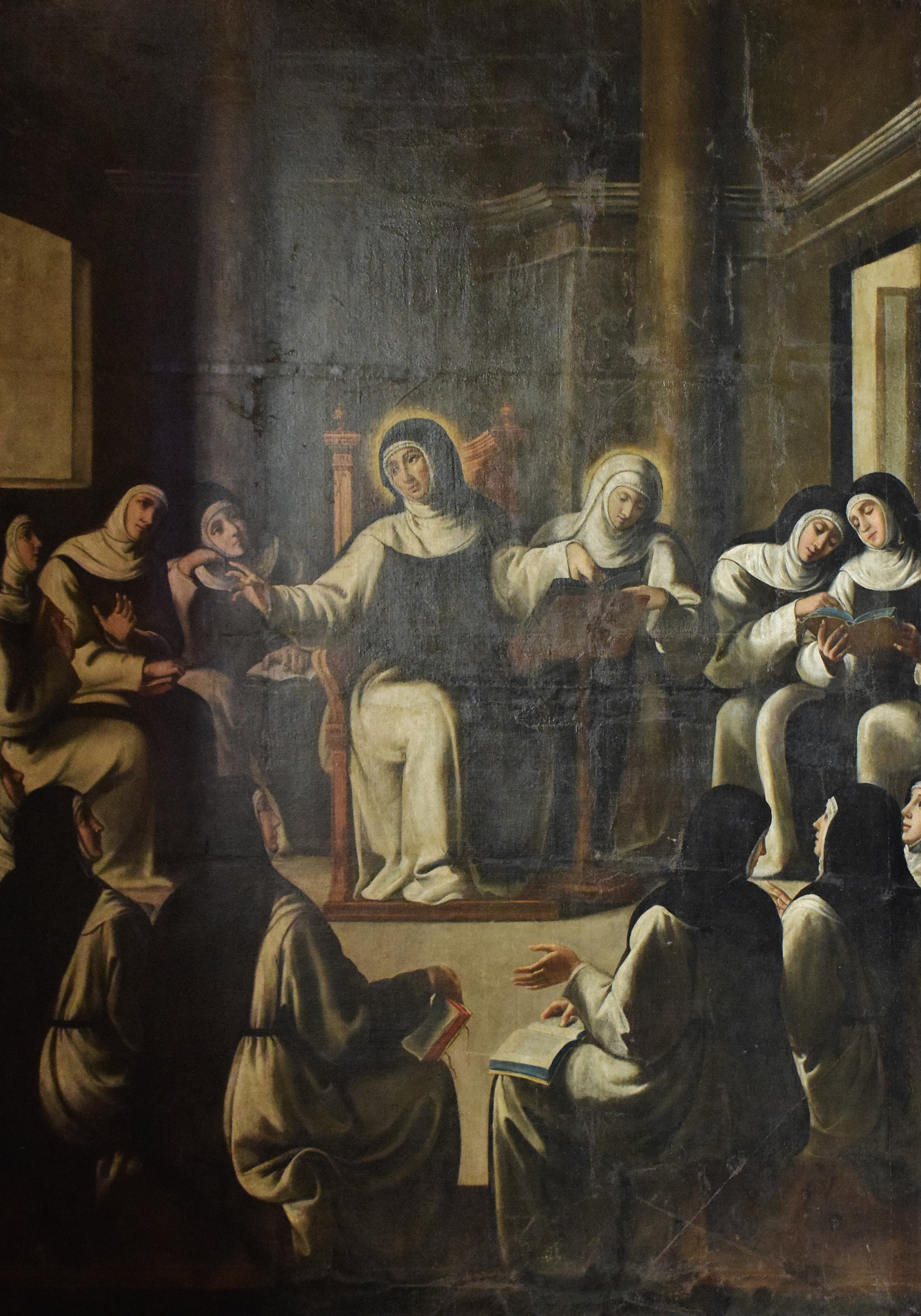
Saint Paula with her nuns, 17th century. Painting of André Reinoso in Monastery of the Hieronymites, Lisbon, Portugal.

Once completed, Paula's convent (nuns monastery) and Jerome's monastery were strictly segregated by gender during manual labor and meals, but practiced prayer in the same locale. Additional separation, within the nun monastery, included three different communities of women based on social rank who were divided in separate living quarters.

During its functioning, Jerome and Paula's retreat attracted large crowds of visitors both from Christian backgrounds and general travelers from a variety of regions including Ethiopia, Persia, and India. Along with this, aristocratic refugees were also drawn to the locale due to Jerome's extensive network of followers. The result of this inclusion, alongside their growing admittance of monks and nuns, left Paula and Jerome's retreat to face financial hardship, having their resources strained. In order to recover costs, which were also depleted by Paula's considerable donations to the needy, Jerome sold his family's property in Italy and Dalmatia.

== Ascetic life ==
It is Jerome's writing's in a letter to Eustochium that provide the most insight on Paula's life during her years of service at the monastery. She is noted as maintaining her ascetic devotion through intensive studies of the Old and New Testaments, often under the guidance of Jerome. With this, she also practiced a strict fasting regimen, abstinence, and pursued a destitute lifestyle "to preserve a singular attachment to God" as stated by Jerome. While practicing this life of isolation, Paula still continued to interact with local clergy and bishops and maintained devout attention to teaching the nuns under her sovereignty. Jerome's letter from 404 moreover indicates Paula's first-hand connection with relics from Christ's passion, "she was shown the pillar of the church which supports the colonnade and is stained with the Lord's blood. He is said to have been tied to it when he was scourged."

Jerome made explicit in his letter how Paula, through these practices, became a recognized figure in the Christian community. At one point, in traveling to Nitria, she was earnestly received by renowned monks from Egypt, and once her death arrived on 26 January 404, her funeral was noted as having a significant portion of the population of Palestine arrive in her honor. A year after she died, Paula was named a saint by the Latin Church, with feast day on 26 January.

== Relationship with Jerome ==
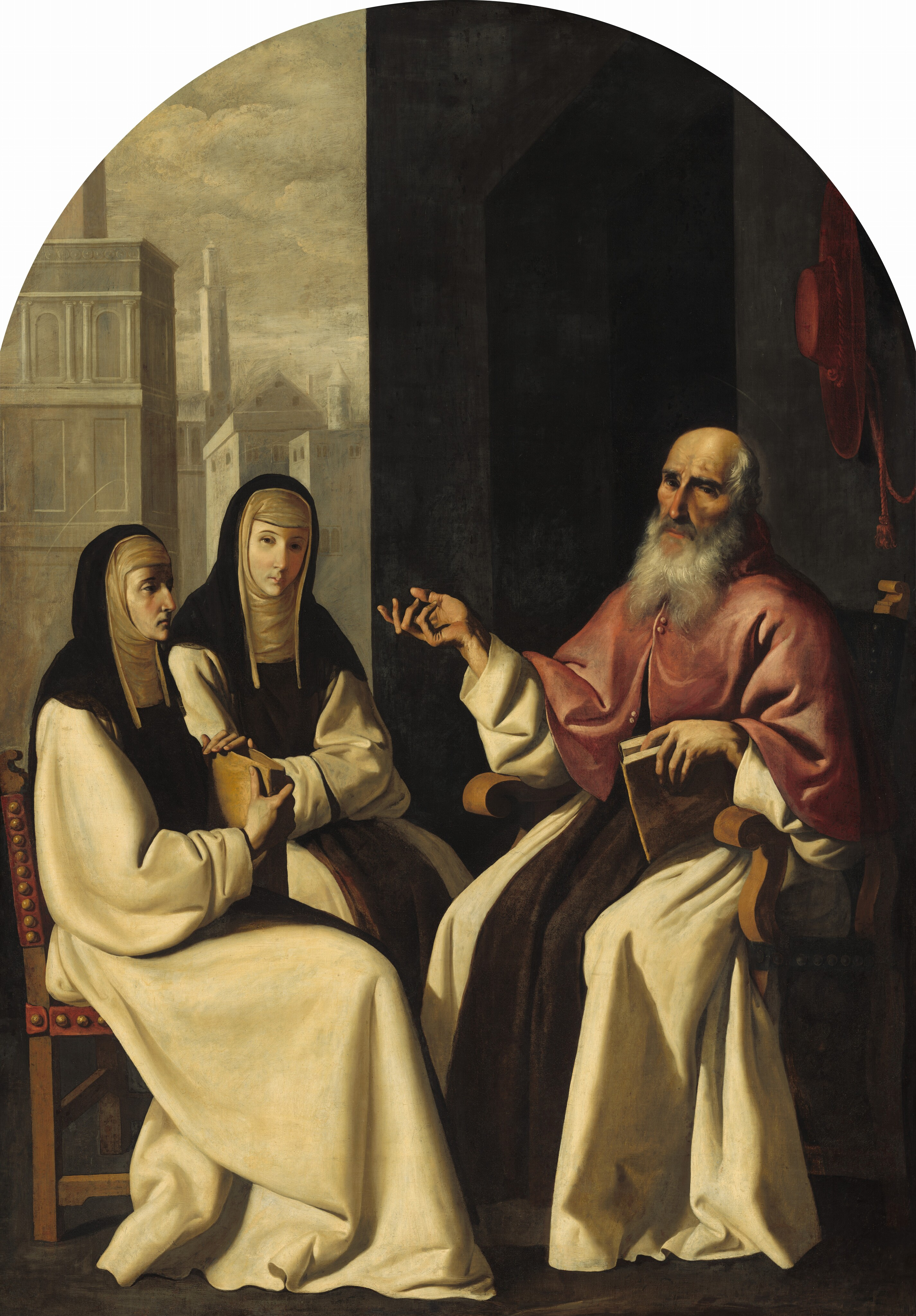
Saint Jerome with Saint Paula of Rome and Saint Eustochium (painting of Francisco de Zurbarán at National Gallery of Art in Washington)

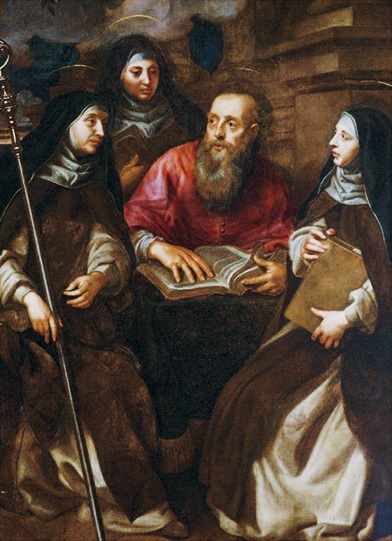
Saint Jerome together with his disciples Saint Paula, Saint Blaesilla and Saint Eustochium (painting of Jan Hovaert at the Church of Saint Mary Magdalene in Genoa)

Jerome's enemies found that his denunciations of clerical indulgence and advocacy of self-denial were odd when they considered his close relationship with Paula. An amorous relationship between Jerome and Paula was suggested as having occurred.

Palladius, a contemporary of Jerome, believed that Paula was hindered by Jerome: "For though she was able to surpass all, having great abilities, he hindered her by his jealousy, having induced her to serve his own plan."

What is known is that Paula financed Jerome's translation of the bible into Latin, now known as the Latin Vulgate bible and he dedicated many of his commentaries and books to her.

When Jerome died in late 419 or early 420, he was buried beneath the north aisle of the Church of the Nativity, in Bethlehem, near the graves of Paula and Eustochium.

=== Medieval interpretations ===
An anecdote told of Jerome, of 12th-century origin, tells that Roman clergy hostile to Jerome planned to have him expelled from the city by planting a woman's robe next to his bed. When Jerome awoke in the middle of the night to attend the service of matins, he absentmindedly put on the female robes. He was thus accused of having had a woman in his bed. This story acknowledges, while at the same time discrediting as a malicious slander, Jerome's relationship with women, such as he is presumed to have had with Paula.

Chaucer played upon the relationship between Jerome and Paula when he writes the Wife of Bath's Prologue. Chaucer has the Wife visit the same pilgrimage sites as did Paula, and has her constantly cite not classical authors, but Jerome. Many of her comments are counter-arguments to those put forth by Jerome, mainly in his work Against Jovinianus.

=== Modern interpretations ===
Feminist authors writing in the late 19th and early 20th century, such as Ellen Battelle Dietrick and John Augustine Zahm, attribute to Paula (and, to a degree, to her daughter Eustochium) a much more comprehensive role in Jerome's work, crediting Paula with first suggesting to him the translation of the Bible from Hebrew and Greek into Latin, resulting in his major oeuvre, the Vulgate, as well as in helping him along with the translation, editing Jerome's manuscripts, providing him the money needed for purchasing the necessary works, and eventually copying the text and putting it into wider circulation.

Dietrick also maintains that Paula "co-labor[ed] with Jerome", being a "woman of fine intellect, highly trained, and an excellent Hebrew scholar," who "revised and corrected Jerome's work" and takes case with the "Churchmen" attributing the Vulgate solely to Jerome, while this fundamental work would have never taken shape without Paula's contribution. Nancy Hardesty, a leading figure in the US evangelical feminist movement whose publishing and public activity career started in the 1960s and peaked in the 1970s, wrote in 1988 about Paula in a popular Christian history magazine, speaking of how she paid Jerome's living expenses, and agreeing with several points from Dietrick and Zahm.

However, W.H. Fremantle, who wrote the Jerome chapter of the classical Nicene and Post-Nicene Fathers (NPNF) series, published in 1892 and including all of Jerome's surviving letters to Paula and Eustachium, does not mention Paula's or Eustochium's name even once in Jerome's biography under "The Vulgate", and only mentions two members of the next generation of "virgins", the younger Paula and Melania, as those who attended to him during his last years.

The famous Epistula 108 written by Jerome at the death of Paula and addressed to Eustochium, while including a biography of his late friend, focuses on what Jerome conceives as Paula's main merits, her ascetic lifestyle and Christian values, but does not mention their working relationship.

Paraphrasing Horace, Jerome writes that "I have built" (to her memory) "a monument more lasting than bronze." The paleographer Sarah Powell interprets this as predicting the long-lasting influence of the entire literary oeuvre left behind by Jerome and his contemporaries of the Augustan age. Catholic scholar John Augustine Zahm interprets Jerome as alluding here to his entire life-work, "but above all [...] the Vulgate" as Paula's monument. Johanna C. Lamprecht, professor of biblical studies, only understands him as referring to that very letter.

Jerome dedicated many of his reworked or new translations to Paula: Job, Isaiah, 1 and 2 Samuel, 1 and 2 Kings, Esther, three of the epistles (Galatians, Philemon, Titus), and the twelve minor prophets, with the Book of Esther being dedicated to both Paula and Eustochium. The official Vatican News presents as Paula's main merit the fact that she had "suggested the need" for the Bible's translation into Latin, and together with her daughter "copied the work so it could be shared far and wide."

== Veneration ==
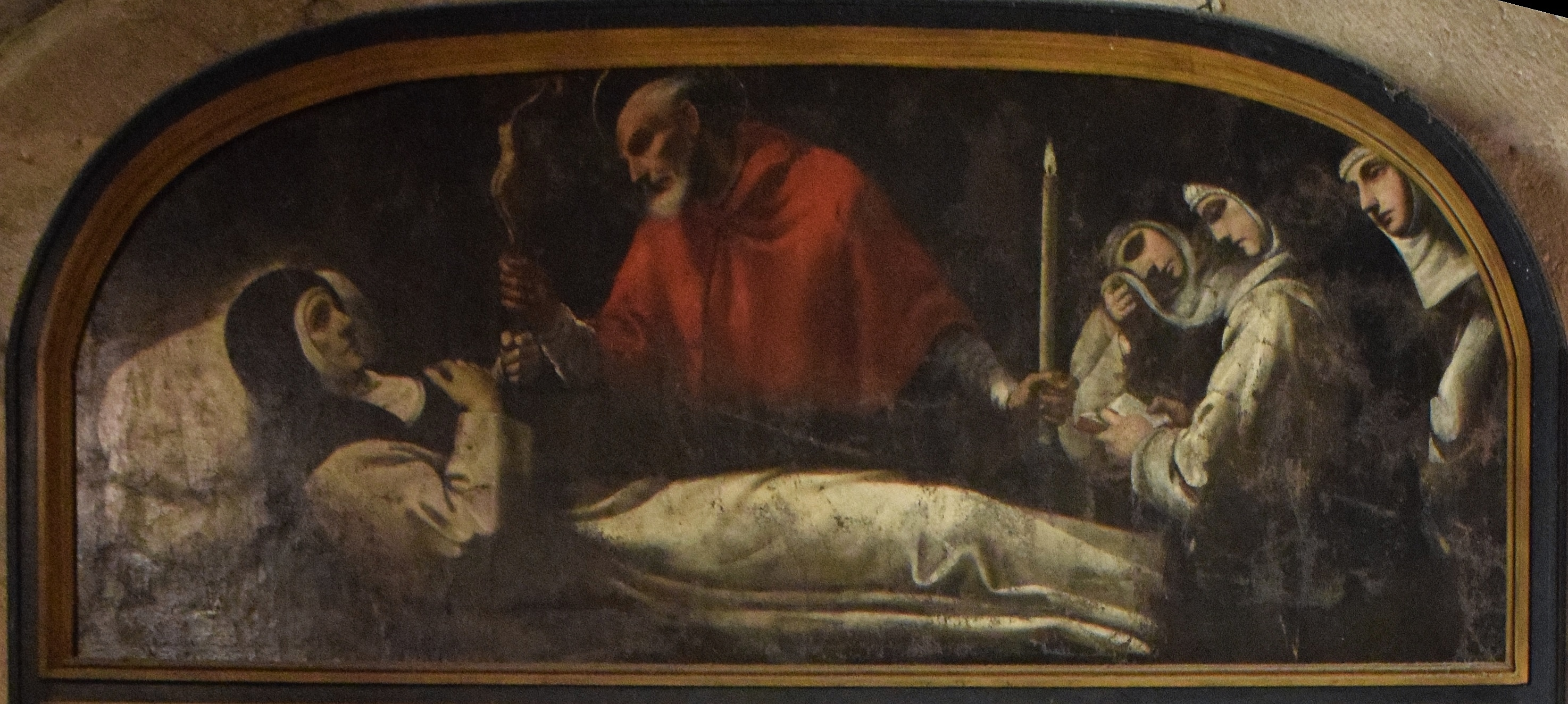
Passage of Saint Paula, mid-17th century, by André Reinoso (currently in the Monastery of the Hieronymites in Lisbon, Portugal)

Saint Paula of Rome has been venerated by the Holy Roman Catholic Church since her death in 404 AD, her feast day is January 26, the date of her death, typically considered by the Catholic Church as the day of a saint’s entrance into Heaven. In 2022, Saint Paula was officially added to the Episcopal Church liturgical calendar with a feast day together with her daughter, Saint Eustochium, on 28 September.

== See also ==
- Hieronymites, also known as the Order of Saint Jerome, of which Saint Paula is co-patroness
- Monastery of Saint Mary of Parral, the motherhouse of the Order of Saint Jerome
- Saint Paula of Rome, patron saint archive
- Santa Paola Romana, church in Rome
- List of Christian women of the early church
