= Pammachius =

Roman senator and saint (340–409)

Saint Pammachius
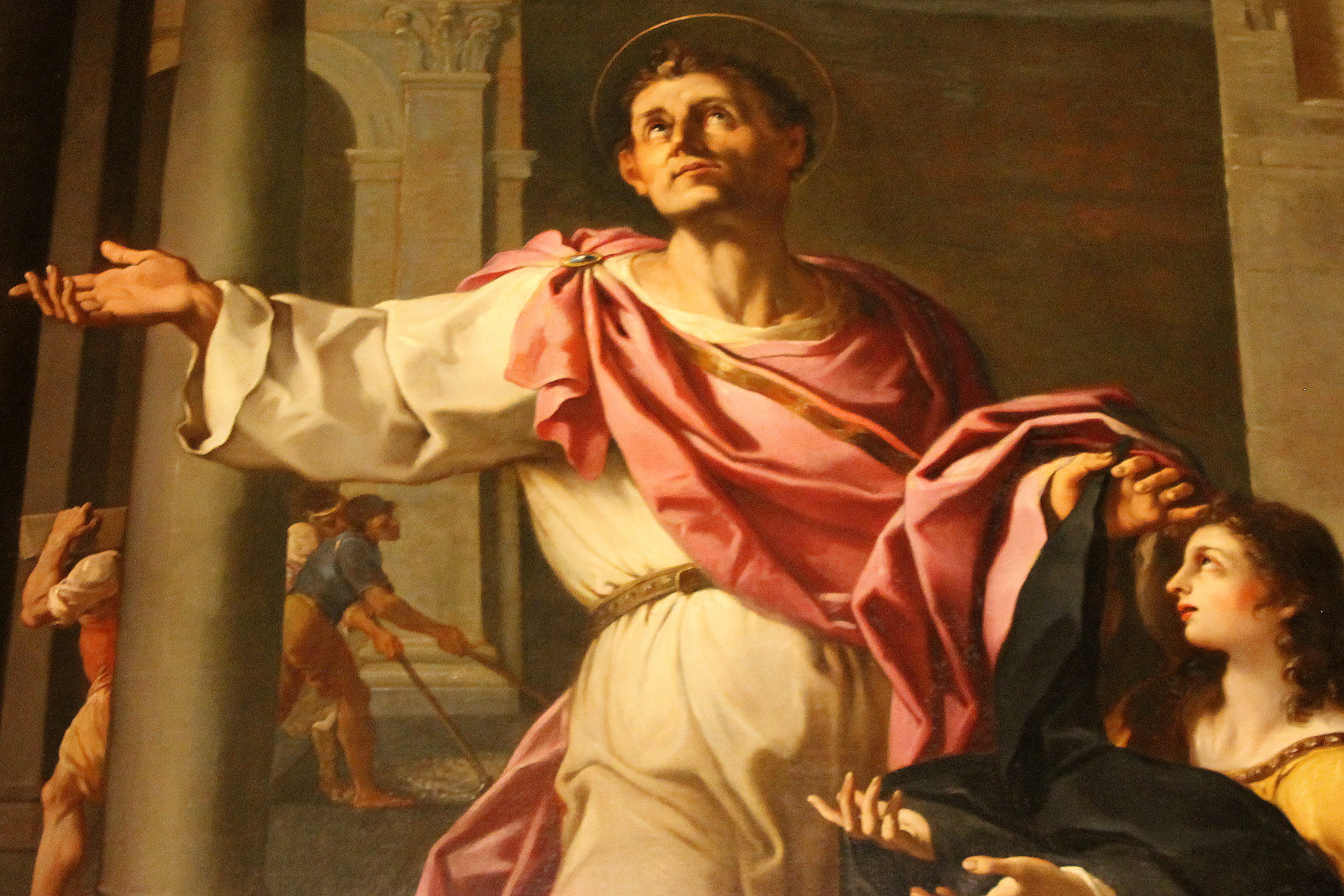
- Detail of a painting of Saint Pammachius above a side altar in the Basilica of Saints John and Paul, Rome
- Died: 410 AD
- Venerated in: Roman Catholic Church; Eastern Orthodox Church
- Feast: 30 August

Pammachius (d. 410 AD) was a Roman senator who is venerated as a saint in the Eastern Orthodox and Roman Catholic Churches. He married Paulina. After her death, he gave himself up to works of charity.

== Biography ==
Pammachius was born to a noble Roman family, possibly the Furii. He was a boyhood friend and classmate in the schools of rhetoric of Jerome.

Pammachius was a senator, and became proconsul. In 385 he married Paulina, second daughter of Paula of Rome. He was probably among the viri genere optimi religione præclari, who in 390 denounced Jovinian to Pope Siricius.

Paulina died in childbirth in 397. After her funeral, Pammachius gave substantial alms to the poor for the repose of her soul. On the advice of his friend Paulinus of Nola, he then gave himself up to works of charity. In 398, with another friend, Fabiola, he built at Porto, at the mouth of the Tiber opposite Ostia, the Xenodochium of Pammachius, a guest-house for pilgrims.

In 399 Pammachius and Oceanus wrote to Jerome asking him to translate Origen's De Principiis, and repudiate the insinuation of Rufinus that Jerome was of one mind with himself with regard to Origen. He corresponded with Jerome on matters of faith, and tried unsuccessfully to get Jerome to tone down the language he used when referring to opponents. Many of Jerome's commentaries on scripture were dedicated to Pammachius. In 401 Pammachius was thanked by Augustine of Hippo for a letter he wrote to the people of Numidia, where he owned property, exhorting them to abandon the Donatist schism.

Pammachius never seems to have entered holy orders, as some have thought; but lived sequestered from the world, devoting himself entirely to the exercises of devotion, penance, and charity. He died in 410.

The liturgical feast of Pammachius is kept on 30 August.

== See also ==
- Saint Pammachius, patron saint archive
