= Eustochium =

4th and 5th-century early Christian monastic founder and saint

Saint Eustochium
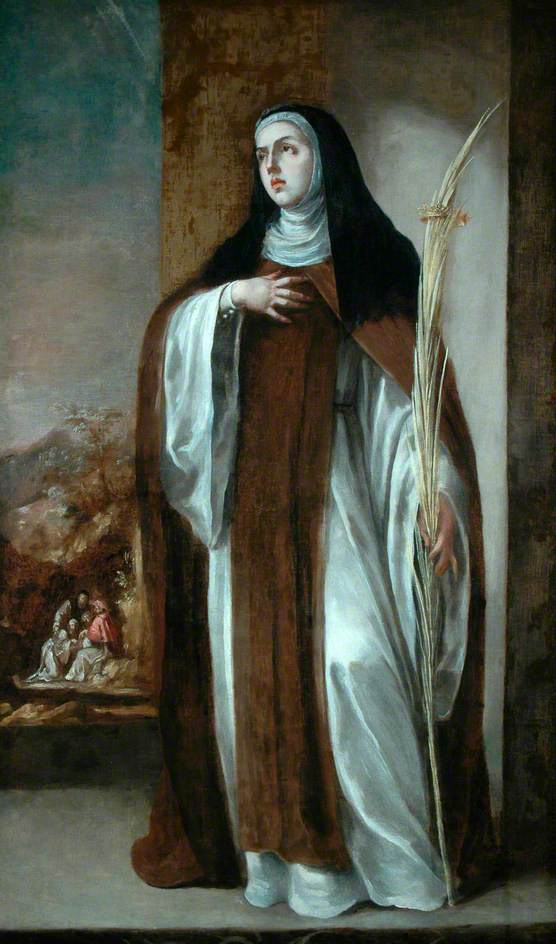
- Saint Eustochium by Juan de Valdés Leal

Virgin
- Born: c. 368; Rome
- Died: c. 419 or 420; Bethlehem
- Venerated in: Roman Catholic Church; Eastern Orthodox Church; Eastern Catholic Churches; Anglican Communion
- Feast: 28 September

Eustochium (c. 368 – September 28, 419 or 420), born Eustochium Julia at Rome, was a high-ranking member of the community, specifically the Julian clan. Eustochium was a fourth-century noblewoman and consecrated virgin, venerated as a saint by the Catholic Church and the Orthodox Church. Guided by the teachings of Jerome, Eustochium practiced asceticism and committed her life to perpetual celibacy.

== Biography ==
Eustochium was the daughter of Paula of Rome and the third of four daughters of the Roman Senator Toxotius, for whom Saint Jerome made a number of disputable claims of ancestry. Jerome was a church father in early Christian history who is well known for translating the Holy Bible into Latin and encouraging the practice of asceticism. After the death of her husband around 380, Paula and her daughter Eustochium lived in Rome as austere a life as the Desert Fathers. Eustochium had three sisters, Blaesilla, Paulina, and Rufina, and a brother, Toxotius.

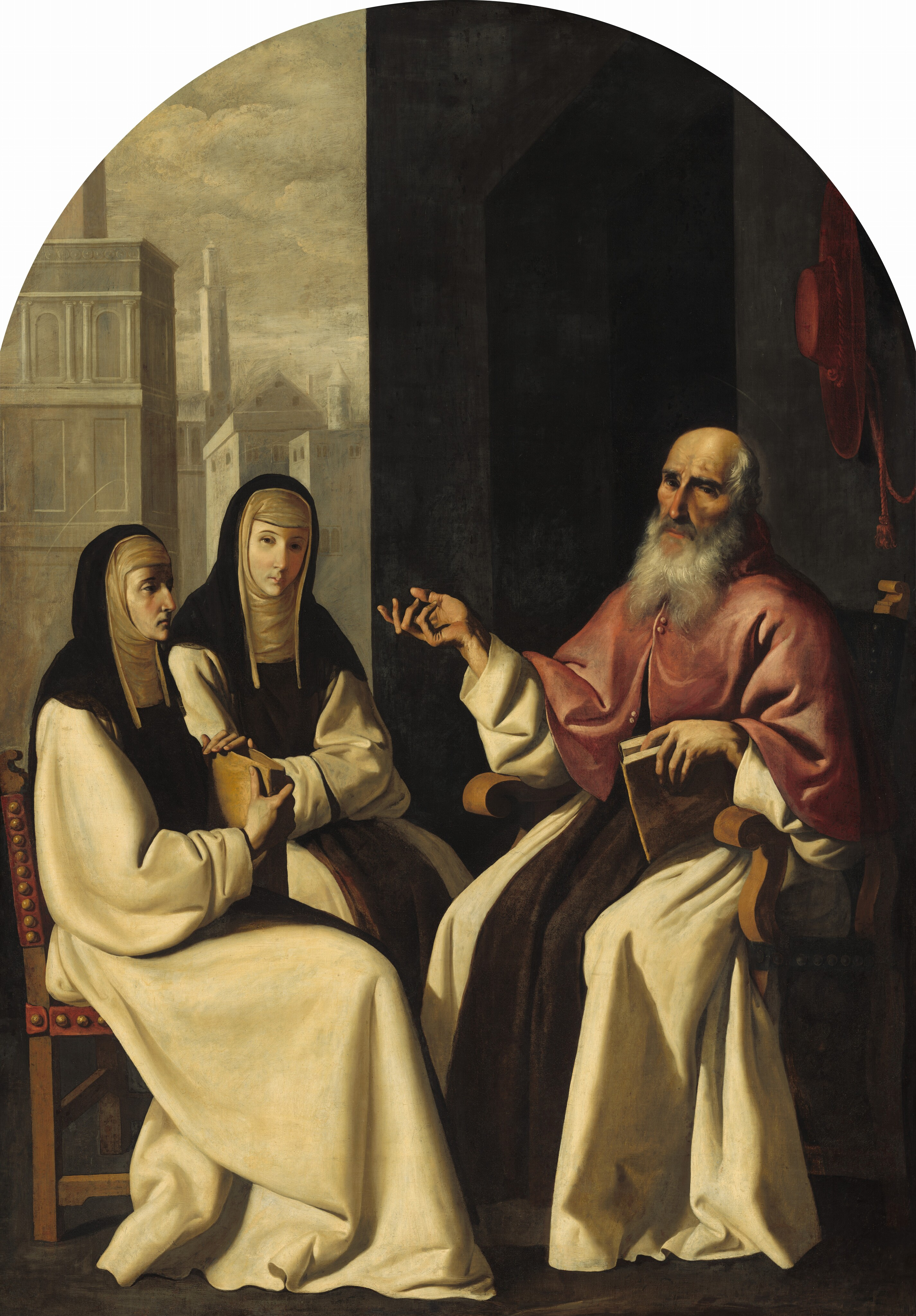
Saint Jerome, Saint Paula, and Saint Eustochium, at National Gallery of Art in Washington.

When Jerome came to Rome from Palestine in 382, they put themselves under his spiritual and educational guidance. Hymettius, an uncle of Eustochium, and his wife Praetextata tried to persuade the youthful Eustochium to give up her austere life and enjoy the pleasures of the world, but all their attempts were futile. About the year 384 she made a vow of perpetual virginity, on which occasion Jerome addressed to her his celebrated letter De custodia virginitatis (Ep. xxii in P.L., XXII, 394–425). A year later Jerome returned to Palestine and soon after was followed by Paula and Eustochium.

Eustochium and Paula knew Jerome ever since his arrival in Rome in 382. In 386 they accompanied Jerome on his journey to Egypt, where they visited the hermits of the Nitrian Desert in order to study and afterward imitate their mode of life. In the fall of the same year they returned to Palestine and settled permanently at Bethlehem. Paula and Eustochium at once began to erect four monasteries and a hospice near the spot where Christ was born. While the monasteries were constructed (386–9) they lived in a small building in the neighborhood. One of the monasteries was occupied by monks and put under the direction of Jerome. The three other monasteries were taken by Paula and Eustochium and the numerous virgins that flocked around them. The monastic community encompassed separate quarters for men and women. The three convents, which were under the supervision of Paula, had only one oratory, where all the virgins met several times daily for prayer and the liturgy of the hours. Jerome testifies (Ep. 308) that Eustochium and Paula performed the most menial services. Much of their time they spent in the study of scripture under the direction of Jerome.

Eustochium spoke Latin and Classical Greek with equal ease and was able to read the scriptures in the Hebrew text. Many of Jerome's Biblical commentaries owe their existence to her influence and to her he dedicated his commentaries on the prophets Isaias and Ezekiel.

The letters which Jerome wrote for her instruction and spiritual advancement are, according to his own testimony, very numerous. Jerome wrote Epitaph on Saint Paula, or Letter 108, honoring a friend and comrade in the form of a letter to Eustochium. Within Letter 108, Jerome briefly states that he's writing the letter to comfort Eustochium after her mother's death. Jerome's letter to Eustochium could be considered slander towards women. One modern scholar pointed to Jerome's opinions on ideal sexuality and body restrictions for women. However, his letters to Eustochium did not direct slander towards her, but rather praised her for her perpetual virginity. Another scholar considers his letter to be the finest expression of his ascetic doctrine. After the death of Paula in 404, Eustochium assumed the direction of the nunneries. Her task was a difficult one on account of the impoverished condition of the temporal affairs which was brought about by the lavish almsgiving of Paula. Jerome provided his encouragement and advice.

In 417, a crowd of ruffians attacked and pillaged the monasteries of Bethlehem, destroyed one of them by fire, besides killing and maltreating some of the residents. It is alleged that this was instigated by John II, the Patriarch of Jerusalem and the Pelagians against whom Jerome had written what were considered sharp polemics. Both Jerome and Eustochium informed Pope Innocent I by letter of the occurrence, who severely reproved the patriarch for having permitted the outrage. Eustochium died shortly after and was succeeded in the supervision of the convents by her niece, the younger Paula. Eustochius of Tour might have been her nephew, and further lateral descendants may include Perpetuus and Volusianus. The Catholic Church celebrates her feast on 28 September.

== Veneration ==
In 2022, Saint Eustochium was officially added to the Episcopal Church liturgical calendar with a feast day on 28 September, along with her mother, Saint Paula of Rome.

== See also ==
- Regarding the interaction between Paula and Eustochium with their mentor, Saint Jerome, see Paula of Rome#Modern interpretations
