= Filomena Pennacchio =

Italian brigand

- Born: November 6, 1841; San Sossio Baronia, Italy
- Died: February 17, 1915 (aged 73); Turin, Italy
- Occupation: Italian brigand
- Spouse: Antonio Maria Valperga (1883 - 1915)
- Partner: Giuseppe Schiavone (1862 - 1864)

Filomena Pennacchio (1841 – 1915), also known as Philomena Pennacchio, was a 19th-century Italian brigand. She joined a gang of brigands in 1862. Throughout her time with the brigands, she earned herself the nickname "Queen of the Woods". She was arrested in 1864 and sentenced to prison. Eventually, she was released and lived in Turin, Italy, for the rest of her life. She died on February 17, 1915.

== Life ==
=== Early life ===
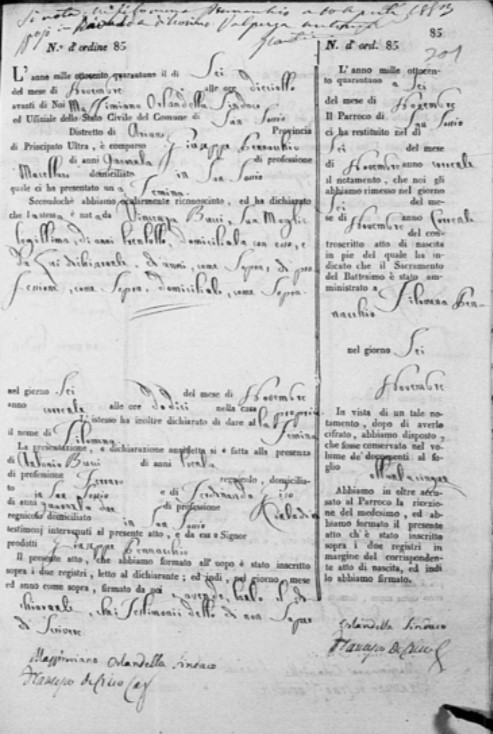
Filomena Pennacchio's birth certificate from the archives of San Sossio Baronia

Pennacchio was born in San Sossio Baronia, Italy in 1841 to her father, Giuseppe Antonio Pennacchio, and mother, Vincenza Maria Caterina Bucci. Her father was a butcher. However, she soon became orphaned after her mother died when Pennacchio was 4 years old and her father died in 1853.

Pennacchio subsequently joined the brigand life in 1862. However, there are two conflicting narratives about how she became a brigand.

The first version claims that Pennacchio murderered her husband with a pin before fleeing the scene. The marriage had occurred when Pennacchio was young, and her husband became abusive. Pennacchio murdered him in defense and fled into the woods, where she found Giuseppe Caruso and his gang.

The second version insists that Pennacchio worked on a local farm, owned by Nicola Misso, until 1862. Then the farm was attacked by a group of brigands, led by Giuseppe Schiavone, an already successful brigand. Pennacchio was violently coerced into traveling with the gang. Incidentally, this was the narrative which Pennacchio herself repeated during her eventual arrest. She claimed that this pivotal event occurred in 1863, even though her first brigand activity was documented in October of 1862.

=== Brigand life ===
Brigands in the South of Italy

Pennacchio chose brigandage a year after the Unification of Italy in 1861. This time was classified as a new era of brigandage, in which brigands were more politically focused. In 1862, around 350 bands of brigands were active in Italy. While there were brigands all throughout Italy, the most famous emerged in Southern Italy. These brigands were mostly made up of peasants, former prisoners, former soldiers, farmers, and people loyal to the Bourbon army. Brigands frequently led attacks against landowners and aligned peasants. They frequently looted villages and committed other acts of violence, such as arson, murder, kidnapping, and extortion.

==== Pennacchio's contributions to brigandage ====
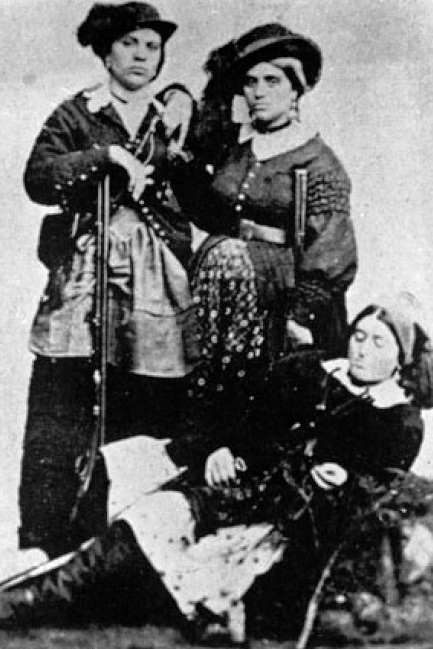
Filomena Pennacchio (top left), Giuseppina Vitale (top right), and Maria Giovanna Tito (bottom right)

Pennacchio was involved in Italian brigandage from 1862-1864. She joined a gang when she was 22 years old and spent a majority of the 3 years with Giuseppe Schiavone. Although the exact extent of her contributions remain unclear, she was a very active member of the gang.

The first known instance of Pennacchio's participation in crime was a robbery which occurred in Trevico in 1862. The brigand band had passed through the town and had threatened the townsfolk for gold and money. A local farm owner refused, and Pennacchio extorted the farmer by slitting the throats of their livestock.

Later in 1863, she kidnapped a child from Vallata. She continued on to Orsara where she stole livestock. In July of 1863, while traveling through Sferracavallo, the gang came across a local group of soldiers from the 45th Infantry. This resulted in a shoot-out between the two groups where Pennacchio was responsible for at least two of the total ten soldiers found dead.

Another instance of Pennacchio's participation in brigandage occurred in Calitri. She saved Schiavone by killing the Sergeant of the Hussars with a revolver. Later, after an unsuccessful raid of her home town, San Sossio Baronia, Filomena Pennacchio took her anger out on the town's local statue, the Crucinova Column. She cut the heads off the four angels which are carved into the base of the column.

==== Lovers ====
While the time frame and number of lovers held by Pennacchio remains vague, the three major lovers typically cited are Giuseppe Schiavone, Carmine Crocco, and Giuseppe Caruso. Depending on the narrative of Pennacchio's origin into brigand life, the history of the lovers alters.

The first version is reliant on the belief that she ran from her husband and met Caruso. After joining his gang, he quickly fell in love with her and they began a relationship. Later on, their gang crossed paths with Carmine Crocco, another famous brigand of southern Italy. Crocco declared his love for Pennacchio and proposed a duel between him and Caruso. Yet the duel did not occur, and later Pennacchio met and fell in love with Giuseppe Schiavone.

The second version is reliant on the belief that she was captured from the farm by Giuseppe Schiavone and slowly fell in love with him throughout their time together.

Despite the differing narratives, her most significant brigand relationship appears to have been with Giuseppe Schiavone. When Schiavone was captured in 1864, Pennacchio was suspected to be pregnant with his child. At the time, Pennacchio was separated from Schiavone. Due to her pregnancy, she was in hiding with the midwife Angiola Battista Prato in Melfi. Once Schiavone was made aware of the death sentence, he requested to see Filomena one last time. The request was granted, only if he gave the location of where she was staying, which he did and then went to visit her. The final moments of the couple were spent sharing kisses and with Schiavone asking Filomena for forgiveness. On November 28, 1864, Giuseppe Schiavone was executed.

==== Arrest ====
Pennacchio was arrested by General Pallavicini. After the execution of Schiavone, she agreed to collaborate with the authorities. She gave away information and locations regarding fellow brigands. This led to the arrest of many brigands, the most notable being Agostino Sacchitiello, Pasquale Gentile, Maria Giovannina Tito, and Giuseppina Vitale. Despite the collaboration with the authorities, Pennacchio was still sentenced to 20 years of hard labor. She initially completed this sentence under the nuns of San Vincenzo in Melfi. Later, her sentence was reduced to 7 years and she continued labor in a women's prison.

=== Life after ===
Eventually, Pennacchio was released from prison. In April 1883, she married Antonio Valperga, who was a rich oil merchant. Little is known about their married life. They lived in Turin until his death, and she continued to stay there until her own. Pennacchio was granted the papal blessing from Pope Benedict XV. She died on February 17, 1915.

== Media portrayals ==
There have been different renditions of Pennacchio's story, one of which follow her and her journey accurately while others merely pull inspiration from it. The play "Il grassiere: storie glorie e patorie per franceschiello e re vittorio ovvero: canzone a ballo per pulcinelli, briganti, cantimpanchi e congedo finale," written by Raffaele Nigro, follows the history of the brigands. Filomena Pennacchio is a character in the story and is mentioned throughout the play.

Pennacchio is also fictionalized as the character Margherita in Maria Rosa Cutrufelli's 1990 novel "La Briganta." Margherita's story mirrors key aspects of Pennacchio's life, including her supposed beginning of murdering her husband, joining a gang of brigands, many of her companions, and ending in imprisonment.

The 2024 Netflix series "Brigands: The Quest for Gold" protagonist, Filomena de Marco, has a story similar to Pennacchio. Both figures join gangs of brigands and enter into relationships with Giuseppe Schiavone. However, in the Netflix series, Filomena de Marco married a husband of a high status before joining the brigands.

== Bibliography ==
- Carli, M., Petrizzo, A., & Rubens, A. Ants, bees and female brigands: Cesare Lombroso’s natural history of deviancy. Clio. Women, Gender, History, 55, 117–146. https://www.jstor.org/stable/27342307. 2022.
- David Hilton Wheeler. Brigandage in South Italy. London: Sampson Low, Son, and Marston. 1864.
- Del Monte, A. Brigantesse: storie d’amore e di fucile (1. ed). Ponte Sisto. 2019
- “Filomena Pennacchio.” Roguish. Accessed March 4, 2025. https://roguish.wordpress.com/tag/filomena-pennacchio/.
- Fresta, Mariano. “Filomena, Ovvero La Componente Femminile Del Brigantaggio Ottocentesco.” Dialoghi Mediterranei, November 1, 2024. https://www.istitutoeuroarabo.it/DM/filomena-ovvero-la-componente-femminile-del-brigantaggio-ottocentesco/.
- González de Sande, Estela, and Ángeles Cruzado Rodríguez, eds. Las Revolucionarias: Literatura e insumisión femenina. Sevilla: ArCiBel Editores, 2009.
- Italiana, La Gazzetta. "Brigandage - La Gazzetta Italiana". The Italian Gazette, November 2016. www.lagazzettaitaliana.com.
- Nigro, Raffaele. Il grassiere: storie glorie e patorie per franceschiello e re vittorio ovvero: canzone a ballo per pulcinelli, briganti, cantimpanchi e congedo finale. Fasano (Br., Italia): Schena editore. 1992.
- Nigro, Raffaele. “Storia. Filomena Pennacchio, La Brigantessa Che Passò Dalla Selva Al Rosario.” Avvenire, July 9, 2024. https://www.avvenire.it/agora/pagine/la-brigantessa-passodalla-selva-al-rosario.
- “Photographs at Liberty: Brigandesses.” Museo di Antropologia Criminale Cesare Lombroso - Università di Torino, July 27, 2020. https://www.museolombroso.unito.it/en/photographs-at-liberty-brigandesses-stayathome/.
- Zio, B. d. Il brigante Crocco e la sua autobiografia memorie e documenti. Tip. G. Grieco. http://catalog.hathitrust.org.li bproxy.wustl. edu/api/volumes/o clc/80169653.html. 1903.
