= Li chiamarono... briganti! =

- Theatrical release poster
- Directed by: Pasquale Squitieri
- Written by: Giuseppe Carocci
- Produced by: Massimo Iacobis
- Starring: Enrico Lo Verso; Branko Tesanovic; Claudia Cardinale; Franco Nero; Remo Girone; Roberta Armani; Giorgio Albertazzi; Lina Sastri
- Music by: Luigi Ceccarelli
- Distributed by: Medusa Film
- Release date: 28 May 1999
- Running time: 129 minutes
- Country: Italy
- Language: Italian

Li chiamarono... briganti! (They called them... brigands!) is a 1999 Italian film, directed by Pasquale Squitieri. It tells the story of Carmine Crocco, a 19th-century Italian brigand who gained recognition when he came to the forefront of the brigandage during the Italian unification, by opposing the army of King Victor Emmanuel II. It stars Enrico Lo Verso, Claudia Cardinale, Franco Nero, Remo Girone, Giorgio Albertazzi, among others. The movie was quickly suspended from its cinema run and it is not available on VHS or DVD. Some people think this was for the censorship of the Italian army.

== Plot ==
Carmine Crocco (Enrico Lo Verso) is an outlaw native of Rionero in Vulture (Basilicata), who was forced to the bandit's life after killing a man who had harassed his sister. He joined Giuseppe Garibaldi's Expedition of the Thousand against the Kingdom of the Two Sicilies hoping for a pardon, because the Savoy's government promised to forgive deserters in exchange for military service. But the promise wasn't kept and Crocco was arrested. He also noted that the economic situation was getting worse, with new taxes and growing unemployment.

He is soon released with the help of the local clergy and, disappointed by the unfulfilled promise of the new government, Crocco is persuaded by the cleric Don Pietro (Remo Girone) to become the leader of the resistance against Victor Emmanuel II, promising him money and weapons. Thus Crocco joins the Bourbon side, forming an army composed mainly of poor people.

The brigand and his men conquer the Vulture region in the name of king Francis II, gaining the support of the local population. The new Italian government is worried about this rebellion and General Enrico Cialdini (Benoît Vallès) is assigned to suppress it. The repression is cruel; Cialdini orders the shooting of the brigands and anyone who deals with them, mass killings (where even women and children are not spared) and confiscation of basic necessities.

Meanwhile, the Bourbon government in exile sends the Spanish General José Borjes (Francesco Mazzini) to Basilicata, to reinforce and discipline the bands. Crocco does not trust Borjes from the start because he is worried about losing his leadership, but he accepts the alliance. After some victorious battles, Crocco breaks the alliance with Borjes because he does not want to serve under a foreigner.

Crocco's lieutenant, Caruso (Ennio Coltorti), betrays him hoping for clemency, revealing to the authorities the hideouts of the brigands. After his betrayal, Crocco's army suffers many casualties and many of his men are captured and executed by firing squad. In the face of a losing battle, the only way to save himself is escape.

== Cast ==
- Enrico Lo Verso as Carmine Crocco: a labourer forced to flee after a crime of honour. He fought for Garibaldi in the hope of an amnesty but, disappointed by the unkept promise, joined the Bourbon side against the Savoy's government.
- Branko Tesanovic as Ninco Nanco: Crocco's loyal lieutenant. He participates in the conquest of the Vulture territories, demonstrating brilliant guerilla tactics.
- Roberta Armani as Filomena: a cold blooded female brigand, she is also Crocco's fiancée.
- Claudia Cardinale as Assunta: a peasant, mother of two children who are members of Crocco's army.
- Ennio Coltorti as Caruso: Crocco's lieutenant. He later betrays his boss in exchange for forgiveness.
- Benoît Vallès as Enrico Cialdini: general of the Savoy Royal Army sent to choke the rebellion. He applies any method to achieve his purpose, and was criticized by other militaries of the Italian government.
- Remo Girone as Don Pietro: a priest who helps Crocco providing weapons and money. He is the intermediary between the brigands and the Papal States.
- Franco Nero as Nerza: a corporal of carabiniers. A quiet and conscientious man, he is the main opposition to Cialdini's methods, although he is obliged to respect them.
- Carlo Croccolo as Don Vincenzino: a cobbler who supports the Crocco's resistance.
- Francesco Mazzini as José Borjes: a Spanish General sent by the Bourbon government to reinforce the brigands but the alliance did not last.
- Giorgio Albertazzi as Cardinal Antonelli: a cardinal of the Papal States who financed the brigands' rebellion.

== Setting ==
Although the film is set in the Vulture area in Basilicata, it was filmed in Artena, in the province of Rome.

== Reception ==
Li chiamarono... briganti! received poor reviews and earned only 107 million lire. It was withdrawn from cinemas only three days after its release due to its low earning at the box office. The writer Lorenzo Del Boca, known for his revisionist books about the Italian unification, stated that the low earnings were due to it being "boycotted to be watched by as few people as possible". Adolfo Morganti, director of the publishing company Il Cerchio and national coordinator of the association Identità Europea, told that the "Medusa" company, owner of the film, refuses to assign the broadcasting rights.

== See also ==
- Carmine Crocco
- Ninco Nanco
- Enrico Cialdini
- Brigandage in the Two Sicilies
- Italian unification
- List of banned films
