= Ninco Nanco =

Italian revolutionary

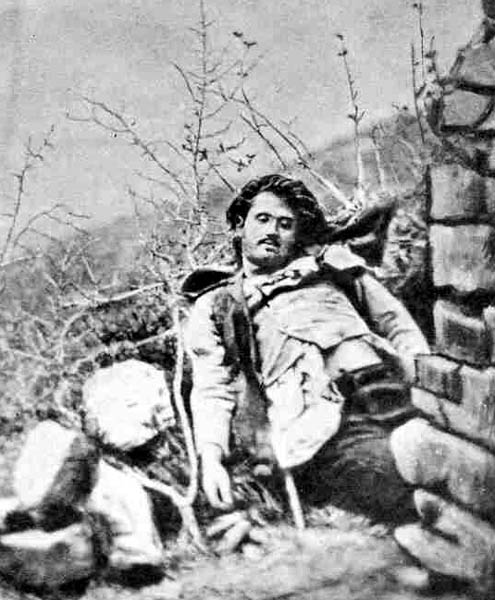
- Ninco Nanco after his execution
- Born: April 12, 1833; Avigliano, Basilicata
- Died: March 13, 1864 (aged 30) shot death in Frusci, then hanged in Avigliano, Basilicata
- Other name: Ninco Nanco
- Organization: Brigandage in Southern Italy
- Spouse: Caterina Ferrara (1851–1853)

Giuseppe Nicola Summa, known as Ninco Nanco (April 12, 1833 – March 13, 1864), was an Italian brigand. One of the most important brigands after the Italian unification, he was a lieutenant of Carmine Crocco, band chief of the Vulture area, in Basilicata. He was known for his brilliant guerrilla warfare and for his brutality against his enemies.

== Biography ==
=== Early years ===
Son of Domenico Summa and Anna Coviello, he was born into a poor family involved with problems with the law. His maternal uncle, Giuseppe Nicola Coviello, was a bandit who died burned in a hut where he was hiding from the police; his paternal uncle, Francescantonio, was sentenced to ten years for beating a bourbon gendarme and, after the imprisonment, fled to Apulia after killing a man for a matter of gambling, working as a servant for a landowner of Cerignola but he left soon for banditry.

His father, though an honest farmer, had alcohol problems and one of his sisters was a prostitute. Still a little boy, Ninco Nanco began to work as a servant for a nobleman and later as a keeper of vineyards. At 18, he married a girl called Caterina Ferrara, orphaned of both parents. The couple had no children and the marriage lasted two years. In his young age, he was often protagonist of violent episodes.

One day, he was beaten and stabbed in a leg by some people, forcing him into three months of recovery. Instead of denouncing the deed, he preferred personal revenge, killing one of his aggressors with an axe. Ninco Nanco was arrested and sentenced to ten years in Ponza but he escaped in August 1860. He went to Naples, trying to join the Garibaldine army but he was rejected. He tried also to enter the Italian National Guard but the result was negative. Forced to brigandage, he began to live by robbery.

=== Brigandage ===
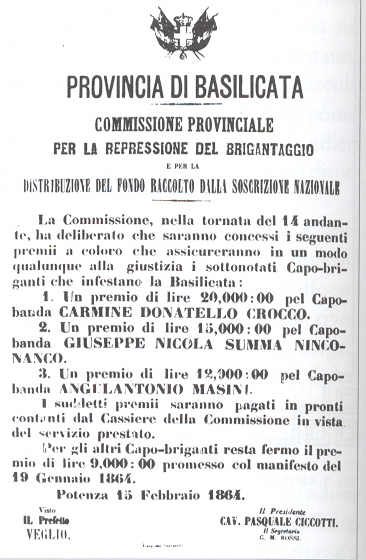
Wanted poster of Carmine Crocco, Ninco Nanco and Angelantonio Masini

On January 7, 1861, he met Carmine Crocco, becoming one of his best subordinates. Ninco Nanco participated in the conquest of the entire Vulture zone, pushing forward to the province of Matera, Irpinia and Capitanata. He had his own band of 50 men, remaining disposable to Crocco's orders in case of a big conflict against the royal troops. His principal targets were rich landowners, resorting to kidnapping, homicide and properties devastation for ransom to finance his band activities.

Ninco Nanco became soon known for his cold-blooded and ferine acts. The most known episode of his brigand life happened in January 1863, when he killed in the wood of Castel Lagopesole Costantino Pulusella, director of Public Safety of Avigliano, the captain Luigi Capoduro and some of his troops who tried to lead him to surrender. The corpses were discovered days later: Pulusella was found with his hands cut off; Capoduro was beheaded, his head was found on a rock with a stone between his teeth and on his body a cross of Savoy was engraved.

According to the accounts of the time, Ninco Nanco often tore the heart from the chest of captured soldiers. The memory of these actions was still alive among the inhabitants of Basilicata in 1935, when Carlo Levi exiled to Aliano during the fascist regime. The writer met people who claimed to be witnesses of those deeds and reported the anecdotes in his memoir Christ Stopped at Eboli. However, Crocco denied tortures by Ninco Nanco at the expense of military prisoners, stating that he was fierce only for his self-defense.

Beside his cruelty, the brigand made also generous acts. He helped his sisters economically, who lived in miserable conditions and, being deeply religious, he donated money to the priests to celebrate masses in honour of the Lady of Mount Carmel, whose effigy he carried always on his neck. During the siege of Salandra, he spared the life of a priest who had helped his family in the past, ensuring him his protection. Ninco Nanco deposited valuable items in the chapel of Monte Carmine, which were seized and sold in 1863, by order of the antibrigandage committee. The proceeds were used for the renovation of the building. Once, he ordered to one of his men to stop using death threats to extract money from poor people, as they could not support the bands.

=== Death ===
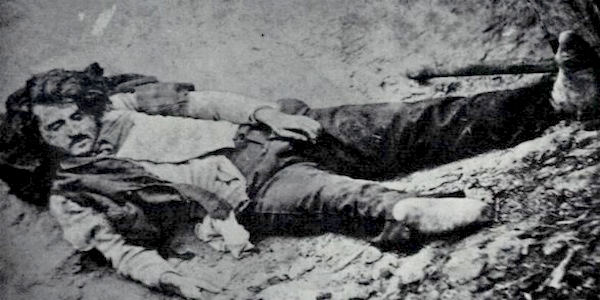
Ninco Nanco's corpse

Ninco Nanco's activity began to weaken in early 1864, because of the betrayal of Giuseppe Caruso, Crocco's lieutenant who decided to collaborate with the Italian government. On March 13, 1864, Ninco Nanco and two of his brigands (one of whom was his brother Francescantonio), while repairing in a farmhouse in the district of Castel Lagopesole, were suddenly surprised by the national guards, headed by captain Benedetto Corbo. The farmhouse was assaulted and, after a short conflict, Ninco Nanco and his men were captured and soon killed.

He was killed with two shots to the throat by Nicola Coviello, corporal of the guards, to avenge the death of his brother-in-law, killed by Ninco Nanco on June 27, 1863, but most probably the brigand was killed by the order of Corbo himself, to prevent his revealing his protectors, including Corbo. In fact Corbo was involved, two months later, in another affair of complicity with the brigands and was accused for having issued, without any authority, two brigands belonging to Ninco Nanco's band.

Crocco wanted to avenge the death of his lieutenant but the arrival of reinforcements in the district of Avigliano forced him to abandon the plan. His corpse was taken to Avigliano and hanged as a warning to the people and, the next day, it was brought to Potenza, where it was buried. His subordinates joined the band of Gerardo De Felice known as "Ingiongiolo", a brigand from Oppido Lucano.

== Ninco Nanco in popular culture ==
- William Henry Giles Kingston wrote a novel about him called Ninco Nanco, The Neapolitan Brigand, from Foxholme Hall (1867).
- He was portrayed by Branko Tesanovic in the movie Li chiamarono... briganti! (1999)
- The Italian musician Eugenio Bennato dedicated the song Ninco Nanco to him, from the 2011 album Questione Meridionale.

== See also ==
- Carmine Crocco
- Brigandage in the Two Sicilies

== Bibliography ==
- Maffei, Andrea; Monnier, Marc (1865). Brigand life in Italy: a history of Bourbonist reaction. Vol. 2. London: Hurst and Blackett.
- Bianchi, Quirino (1903). Il brigante Ninco-Nanco. Naples: tip. Gazz. Dritto e Giuris.
- Cinnella, Ettore (2010). Carmine Crocco. Un brigante nella grande storia. Pisa-Cagliari: Della Porta.
- Pinto, Carmine (2015). "La campagna per la popolazione. Vittime civili e mobilitazione politica nella guerra al brigantaggio". Rivista Storica Italiana. CXXVII (3): 808–852. ISSN 0035-7073.
