= Nanco =

Nanco is a surname. Notable people with the surname include:

- Chris Nanco (born 1995), Canadian soccer player
- Ninco Nanco (1833–1864), Italian brigand
