= Ennio Coltorti =

Italian actor

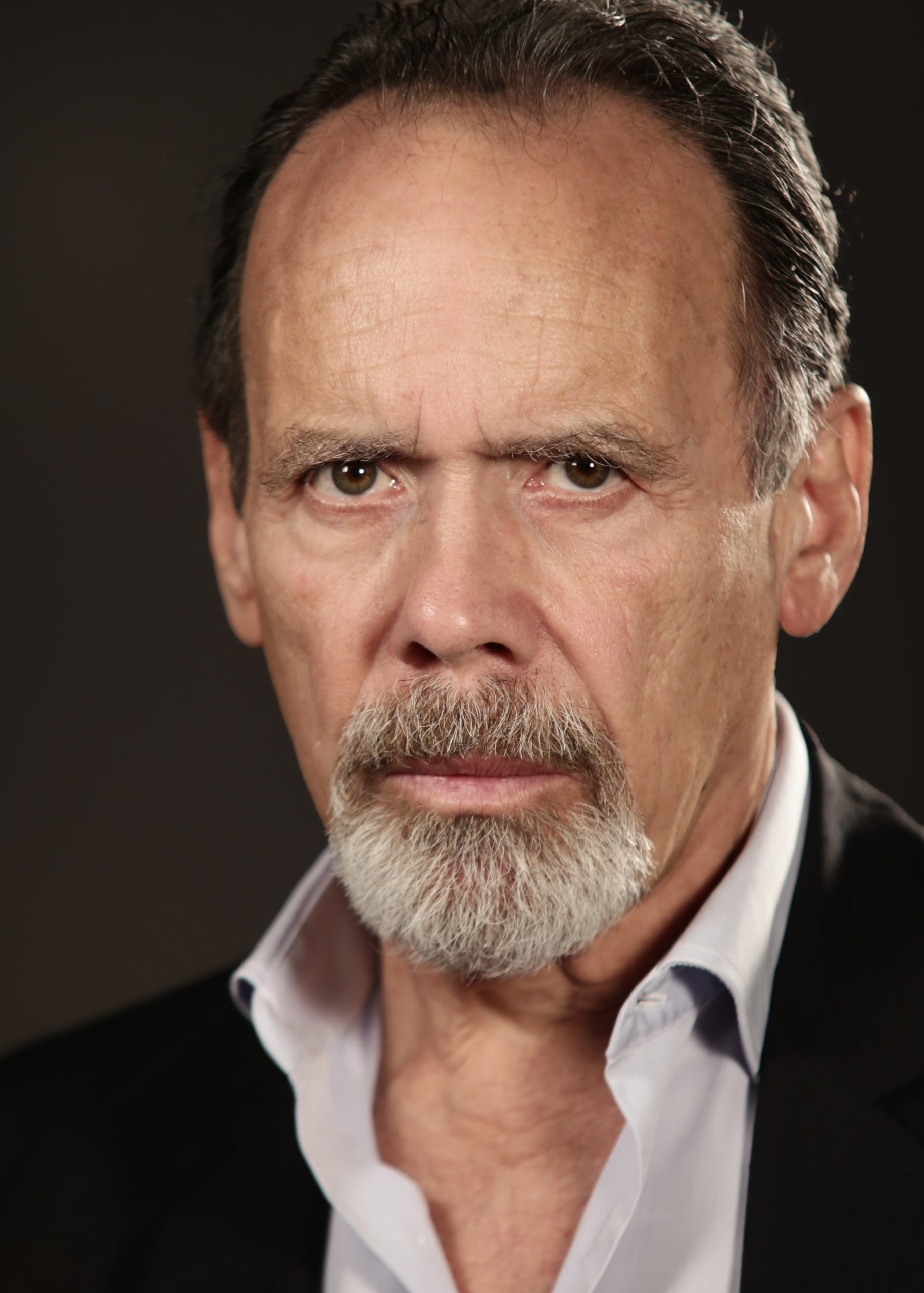
- Coltorti in 2021
- Born: 21 March 1949 (age 77); Rome, Italy
- Occupations: Actor; voice actor; theatre director
- Years active: 1981–present
- Children: Emiliano Coltorti

Ennio Coltorti (born 21 March 1949) is an Italian actor and voice actor.

== Biography ==
Born in Rome, Coltorti attended the Silvio D'Amico National Academy of Dramatic Arts and began acting and directing on stage in 1981, collaborating with Giorgio Albertazzi, Sergio Castellitto, Fiorenzo Fiorentini, Valeria Valeri, and Ennio Fantastichini, among others.

He also had roles on films and television, portraying the judge in Marco Tullio Giordana's film Who Killed Pasolini? and Carmine Crocco's lieutenant Caruso in Li chiamarono... briganti!, also appearing in Ridley Scott's 2001 sequel to The Silence of the Lambs, Hannibal.

Since the late 1980s, Coltorti has focused on voice acting and dubbing. He is the primary Italian voice dubbing artist for Harvey Keitel and has also dubbed Willem Dafoe, J. K. Simmons, Billy Bob Thornton, Sam Shepard, Scott Glenn, Tom Waits and Martin Sheen in some of their films. Coltorti's popular character dubbing roles include Agent Smith (portrayed by Hugo Weaving) in The Matrix franchise and Professor X (portrayed by Patrick Stewart) in the X-Men film series. In his animated roles, he dubbed Fillmore in the Cars franchise.

=== Personal life ===
Coltorti is the father of actor and voice actor Emiliano Coltorti.

== Filmography ==
=== Films ===
Year	Title	Role(s)	Notes
1995	Who Killed Pasolini?	Judge	
1996	The Nymph	Gioacchino	
1999	Li chiamarono... briganti!	Caruso	
2001	Hannibal	Ricci	
2007	L'uomo privato	Commissioner	

=== Television ===
Year	Title	Role(s)	Notes
1992	Una storia italiana	Abbagnali brothers' father	TV series
1995	La rossa del Roxy Bar	Ennio	TV miniseries
1996	Addio e ritorno		TV film
1998	Squadra mobile scomparsi	Pesci	TV series
1998	Linda e il brigadiere	Jannarone	TV series, season 2
1999	Nicholas' Gift		TV film
2000	Tutto in quella notte	Commissioner Mazzocchi	TV miniseries
2005	Imperium: Saint Peter	Persius	TV miniseries
2011	Mannaggia alla miseria		TV film
2022	Màkari	Demetrio Alù	TV series
2024	Pale Mountains	Franco Venturi	TV series

== Dubbing roles ==
=== Animation ===
- The Swarm Lord in The Magic Voyage
- Oogie Boogie (speaking voice) in The Nightmare Before Christmas
- Birk Barlow, Wik and Springfield Shopper director in The Simpsons
- Philoctetes in Hercules: The Animated Series, Disney's House of Mouse
- Yao in Mulan, Mulan II
- Kerchak in Tarzan, Tarzan II
- Thorny in A Bug's Life
- Grebs in Antz
- The Skull in Bartok the Magnificent
- Soto in Ice Age
- Jasper in 101 Dalmatians II: Patch's London Adventure
- Jeb in Home on the Range
- Mr. Woolensworth in Chicken Little
- Fillmore in Cars, Cars 2, Cars 3
- Amos Slade in The Fox and the Hound 2
- Houston in Space Chimps
- The Scotsman in Samurai Jack
- Gondo in Isle of Dogs
- Melephant Brooks in Toy Story 4

=== Live action ===
- Auggie Wren in Smoke, Blue in the Face
- Peter Sadusky in National Treasure, National Treasure: Book of Secrets
- Agent Smith in The Matrix, The Matrix Reloaded, The Matrix Revolutions
- Charles Xavier / Professor X in X-Men, X2, X-Men: The Last Stand, X-Men Origins: Wolverine, The Wolverine, X-Men: Days of Future Past, Logan
- Rocco Klein in Clockers
- George in Head Above Water
- Harry Houdini in FairyTale: A True Story
- Izzy Maurer in Lulu on the Bridge
- P.J. Waters in Holy Smoke!
- Satan in Little Nicky
- Henry Klough in U-571
- Jack Crawford in Red Dragon
- Uncle Pio in The Bridge of San Luis Rey
- Nick Carr in Be Cool
- Weldon Parish in Shadows in the Sun
- Nino in Wrong Turn at Tahoe
- OSS Commander in Inglourious Basterds
- Randall Weir in Little Fockers
- Duke White in A Beginner's Guide to Endings
- Commander Pierce in Moonrise Kingdom
- Ludwig in The Grand Budapest Hotel
- Al in The Congress
- Smiley Harris in The Ridiculous 6
- John P. O'Neill in The Path to 9/11
- Gene Hunt in Life on Mars
- Eric Pollack in The Pledge
- Frank Calhoun in The Notebook
- Narrator in Charlotte's Web
- Robert Rayburn in Bloodline
- Wilder Lloyd in The Accidental Husband
- James Blackthorn / Butch Cassidy in Blackthorn
- Dillon in Killing Them Softly
- Tom Blankenship in Mud
- Beverly Weston in August: Osage County
- Gerald "Red" Baze in Out of the Furnace
- Ben Russell in Cold in July
- Lonnie Earl Dodd in Waking Up in Reno
- Howard D. Doyle in Intolerable Cruelty
- Davy Crockett in The Alamo
- Willie T. Soke in Bad Santa, Bad Santa 2
- Dwight Dickham in The Judge
- Gas in Existenz
- Armando Barillo in Once Upon a Time in Mexico
- Klaus Daimler in The Life Aquatic with Steve Zissou
- Chief of Staff in American Dreamz
- John Darius in Inside Man
- Gavner Purl in Cirque du Freak: The Vampire's Assistant
- Hank Havenhurst in My Son, My Son, What Have Ye Done
- Nuidis Vulko in Aquaman
- Walter E. Kurtz in Apocalypse Now Redux
- Frank Black in Millennium
- Tom Doss in Hacksaw Ridge
- Tom in Coffee and Cigarettes
- Zachariah Rigby in Seven Psychopaths
- Waller in The Old Man & the Gun
- Hermit Bob in The Dead Don't Die
- Ebenezer Scrooge in The Muppet Christmas Carol
- Comte de Reynaud in Chocolat
- Diego Rivera in Frida
- John King Fisher in Texas Rangers
- Mellersh Wilkins in Enchanted April
- Harvey "The Sorcerer" Torriti in The Company
- Pakku in Avatar: The Last Airbender
- Robert Aldrich in Feud
- Ramsley in The Haunted Mansion
- Lando Calrissian in Star Wars: Episode IX – The Rise of Skywalker
- Bill Burton in Absolute Power
- Roger in Training Day
- Jack Buggit in The Shipping News
- Sgt. Robert E. Lee in Buffalo Soldiers
- Steve Gruwell in Freedom Writers
- The Wise Man / The General / The Bus Driver in Sucker Punch
- Ezra Kramer in The Bourne Legacy
- Ted Slocum in The Mexican
- BR in Thank You for Smoking
- Dr. Bertleman in Barefoot
- Randall Zipper in The Meddler
- Roland Hunt in Father Figures
- James Gordon in Justice League
- Jasper in 101 Dalmatians
- Jürgen Mossack in The Laundromat
- Alan Blunt in Stormbreaker
- Rufus Scrimgeour in Harry Potter and the Deathly Hallows – Part 1
- Mick Dundee in Crocodile Dundee in Los Angeles
- Tramp in The Great Muppet Caper
- Jason Wynn in Spawn
- Roger Strong in Catch Me If You Can
- Ben Parker in The Amazing Spider-Man
- Glenn Warburg in Ask Me Anything
- Owen Granger in NCIS: Los Angeles
