= Giuseppe Caruso (brigand) =

Italian brigand

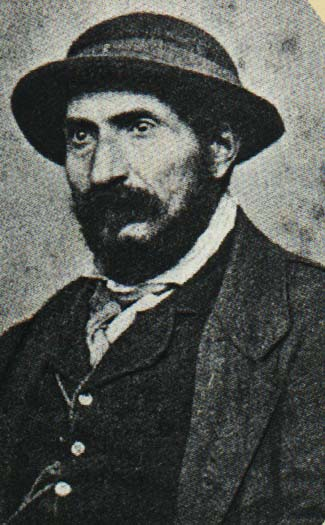
Giuseppe Caruso

Giuseppe Caruso, nicknamed "Zi 'Beppe" (Atella, 18 December 1816 – Atella, 7 August 1891), was an Italian brigand, the most renowned of the Lucan bands. He was, with Giovanni 'Coppa' Fortunato and Ninco Nanco, one of the most ruthless deputies of Carmine Crocco, but also, after being handed over to the Savoy authorities in 1863, one of the men responsible for the suppression of banditry in the Vulture. According to Crocco, Caruso killed 124 people in about four years as a fugitive.

== Biography ==
=== The beginnings of the brigandage ===
Before becoming a brigand, Caruso was a rural caretaker for the Saraceno noble family of Atella. In April 1861, after having shot at a national guardsman, he decided to become a brigand to avoid charges and risk the death penalty. Because of his strategic thinking and excellent leadership abilities, he was able to form a band operating in the Ofantino territory.

Carmino Crocco enrolled his companions and both led various clashes with the national guard and the Italian army. Caruso, under the command of Crocco, actively participated in the conquest of Basilicata and distinguished himself in diverse operations. On 6 April 1862, the gang clashed near Muro Lucano with regular troops, killing nine soldiers.

Caruso continued his activity as a robber and, on 6 September of the same year, with his chief Crocco and another 200 bandits, attacked a farm, robbing ten sacks of fodder for the horses, twenty sacks of grain and ten cloths worth twenty ducats. The Atellani brigand was also one of the architects behind the massacre of 15 cavalrymen from Saluzzo and of an additional 21 between Melfi and Lavello. In 1863, along with Crocco, Coppa and Ninco Nanco, he presented himself to General Fontana, with the captains Borgognini and Corona, to enter into surrender talks, which eventually were not carried out.

=== The betrayal ===
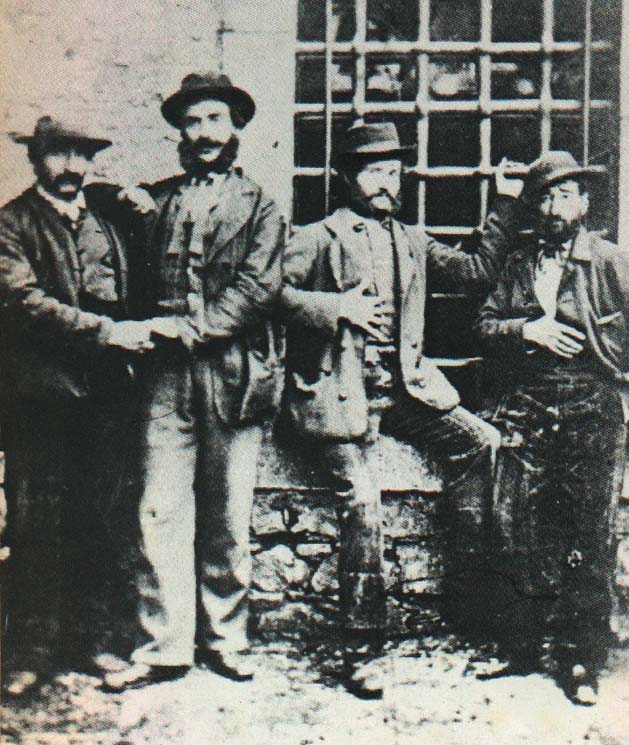
Caruso (first from the left) during his imprisonment in Melfi

Caruso, due to friction with Crocco in unclear circumstances, abandoned the gang and, when convinced by the Saraceno family, surrendered to General Fontana on 14 September 1863 in Rionero. Imprisoned and interrogated in the Potenza jail, Caruso betrayed his companions by revealing to the authorities their strategy and their deals with some local politicians. The betrayal fueled the hate between Crocco and Caruso to the point where, according to Caruso, Crocco tried to kill him in prison by sending him poisoned food.

On 5 October 1863, the Military Tribunal of Potenza condemned Caruso to seven years in prison, after his lawyer had asked for a reduced sentence because of his collaboration with the establishment. On 1 March 1864, he received permission from the prefect to leave prison. Caruso, along with De Vico, captain of the Carabinieri of Potenza, took this opportunity to ambush Crocco and other brigands, killing two of Crocco's men and taking a third to a military prison in Rionero.

After the establishment of the military zone of Melfi-Lacedonia and Bovino, Caruso was then assigned to general Emilio Pallavicini, with whom he continued his repressive activities against the brigands, thanks to his valuable information. During the search for Crocco, Caruso, a crack shot, fired a carbine at a distance of 200 meters at a brigand who resembled his ex-commander, hitting him in the head, killing him instantly. Approaching the body, he discovered that it was one of Crocco's men dressed in his clothes--a trick used to avoid being caught by the authorities.

=== Last period ===
On 7 April 1864, the director of prisons of Potenza asked the sovereign to pardon Caruso, as he had made a great contribution to the annihilation of banditry in Vulture. So on 7 November 1864, King Vittorio Emanuele II granted it. Because of his commitment, the ex-brigand received various privileges and was named brigadiere of the forestal guard of Monticchio at the age of 66. Furthermore, he was given the privilege of carrying firearms for the maintenance of public order and for personal defence. Caruso died in Atella in 1892 at the age of 72.

== Filmography ==
Giuseppe Caruso appears in the following works:

- They called them...bandits! by Pasquale Squitieri (1999), played by Ennio Coltorti.
- The General of the Brigands, by Paolo Poeti (2012), played by Massimiliano Dau.
