= 'O Re =

1989 film by Luigi Magni

- Directed by: Luigi Magni
- Written by: Luigi Magni
- Produced by: Giovanni Di Clemente
- Starring: Giancarlo Giannini; Ornella Muti
- Cinematography: Franco Di Giacomo
- Edited by: Ruggero Mastroianni
- Music by: Nicola Piovani
- Release date: 1989
- Running time: 95 min
- Country: Italy

'O Re (also known as The King of Naples) is a 1989 Italian historical film written and directed by Luigi Magni. For his performance Carlo Croccolo won the David di Donatello for Best Supporting Actor. The film also won the David di Donatello and the Nastro d'Argento for best costumes.

== Plot ==
In 1862, Francis II of Bourbon, the last king of the Two Sicilies, lives in exile in Rome, capital city of the Papal States, with his wife Maria Sophie and the butler Rafele. The king has lost his throne after the conquest of Naples by the Redshirts of Giuseppe Garibaldi. Maria Sophie tries to recover the kingdom, supporting the uprising of rebels and outlaws, named brigands by the new Italian State, but Francesco is demoralized and has no intention of fighting. The king in fact closes in himself, expressing interest in religion and the supernatural...

== Cast ==
- Giancarlo Giannini as King Francis II of the Two Sicilies
- Ornella Muti as Queen Maria Sophie of Bavaria
- Carlo Croccolo as Rafele
- Luc Merenda as Don José Borjes
- Cristina Marsillach as Luciana
- Corrado Pani as General Coviello
- Anna Maria Ackermann as Maria Theresa of Austria, Queen of the Two Sicilies
- Sergio Solli as Pulcinella
- Iaia Forte as la Ferrarese
- Alfredo Vasco as Carmine Crocco
- Anna Kanakis as the brigant
