= Trois Mélodies, Op. 7 (Fauré) =

Songs for solo voice and piano composed by Gabriel Fauré

Trois Mélodies
- Songs by Gabriel Fauré
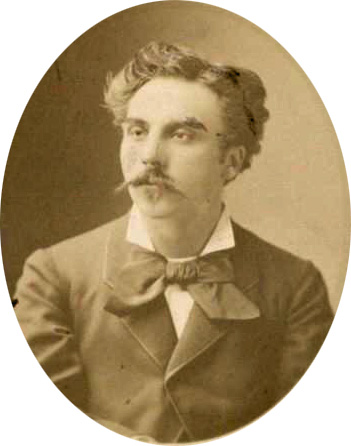
- The composer in 1875
- Opus: 7
- Text: Poems by anon., Baudelaire and Marc Monnier
- Language: French
- Composed: 1870–1877
- Published: 1878
- Movements: three
- Scoring: voice and piano

Trois Mélodies is a set of mélodies for solo voice and piano, by Gabriel Fauré. It consists of "Après un rêve" (Op. 7, No. 1), one of Fauré's most popular vocal pieces, "Hymne" (Op. 7, No. 2), and "Barcarolle" (Op. 7, No. 3). The songs were written between 1870 and 1877 and were published separately, only appearing together for the first time in 1878 as a part of his first of 3 song collections. The opus number 7 was imposed on them retrospectively in the 1890s, almost 20 years after their first publications.

== "Après un rêve" ==
In "Après un rêve" ("After a dream"), a dream of romantic flight with a lover, away from the earth and "towards the light", is described. However, upon awakening, the dreamer longs to return to the "mysterious night" and the ecstatic falsehood of his dream. The text of the poem is an anonymous Italian poem freely adapted into French by Romain Bussine.

Dans un sommeil que charmait ton image
Je rêvais le bonheur, ardent mirage,
Tes yeux étaient plus doux, ta voix pure et sonore,
Tu rayonnais comme un ciel éclairé par l'aurore;

Tu m'appelais et je quittais la terre
Pour m'enfuir avec toi vers la lumière,
Les cieux pour nous entr'ouvraient leurs nues,
Splendeurs inconnues, lueurs divines entrevues,

Hélas! Hélas! triste réveil des songes
Je t'appelle, ô nuit, rends-moi tes mensonges,

Reviens, reviens radieuse,
Reviens ô nuit mystérieuse!

== "Hymne" ==
"Hymne" is set to a poem by Charles Baudelaire. The meaning of the text in "Hymne" is vague to those not aware of Baudelaire's ongoing theme of paradox (as the meaning is quite apparent in his other works): the spirituality of what is sensual and the sensuality of what is sanctified. Fauré's setting of the text centers subtly around this idea. "Hymne", just like "Après un rêve", retains an ethereal mood. The unchanged harmonic motion after "Forever hail!" indicates the entrance to the untroubled world of spirituality. After the word "sel" which literally means salt but in this case refers figuratively to something engaging, the harmony begins to change. Under a soft, but highly chromatic piano line the stanza about "incorruptible love" brings the song to a dramatic climax. After this stint, the piece returns to its tranquil state. However, the piece does end with the melody's tonic note and the piano's leading tone clashing for a stunning effect. The phrase "Sachet toujours frais...travers la nuit" is omitted by Fauré.

À la très chère, à la très belle,
Qui remplit mon coeur de clarté,
À l'ange, à l'idole immortelle,
Salut en immortalité,
Salut en immortalité!

Elle se répand dans ma vie,
Comme un air imprégné de sel,
Et dans mon âme inassouvie,
Verse le goût de l'Eternel.

Sachet toujours frais qui parfume
l'athmosphère d'un cher réduit,
encensoir oublié qui fume
en secret à travers la nuit.

Comment, amor incorruptible,
T'exprimer avec vérité?
Grain de musc, qui gîs invisible,
Au fond de mon éternité?

À la [très bonne], à la très-belle,
Qui remplit mon coeur de clarté,
À l'ange, à l'idole immortelle,
Salut en immortalité,
Salut en immortalité!

== "Barcarolle" ==
Rhythm passed between the singer and the piano

The text for the third piece in the set, "'Barcarolle", was written by Marc Monnier. This piece remains typical of barcarolle form by using the buoyant flow of a 6/8 time signature. Throughout the song, the rhythmic figure, which consists of an eighth note tied to three triplet sixteenth notes, followed by another eighth note, is passed between the voice and the piano.

Gondolier du Rialto
Mon château c'est la lagune,
Mon jardin c'est le Lido.
Mon rideau le clair de lune.
Gondolier du grand canal,
Pour fanal j'ai la croisée
Où s'allument tous les soirs,
Tes yeux noirs, mon épousée.
Ma gondole est aux heureux,
Deux à deux je la promène,
Et les vents légers et frais
Sont discret sur mon domaine.
J'ai passé dans les amours,
Plus de jours et de nuits folles,
Que Venise n'a d'ilots
Que ses flots n'ont de gondoles.
