= Enrico Lo Verso =

Italian actor (born 1964)

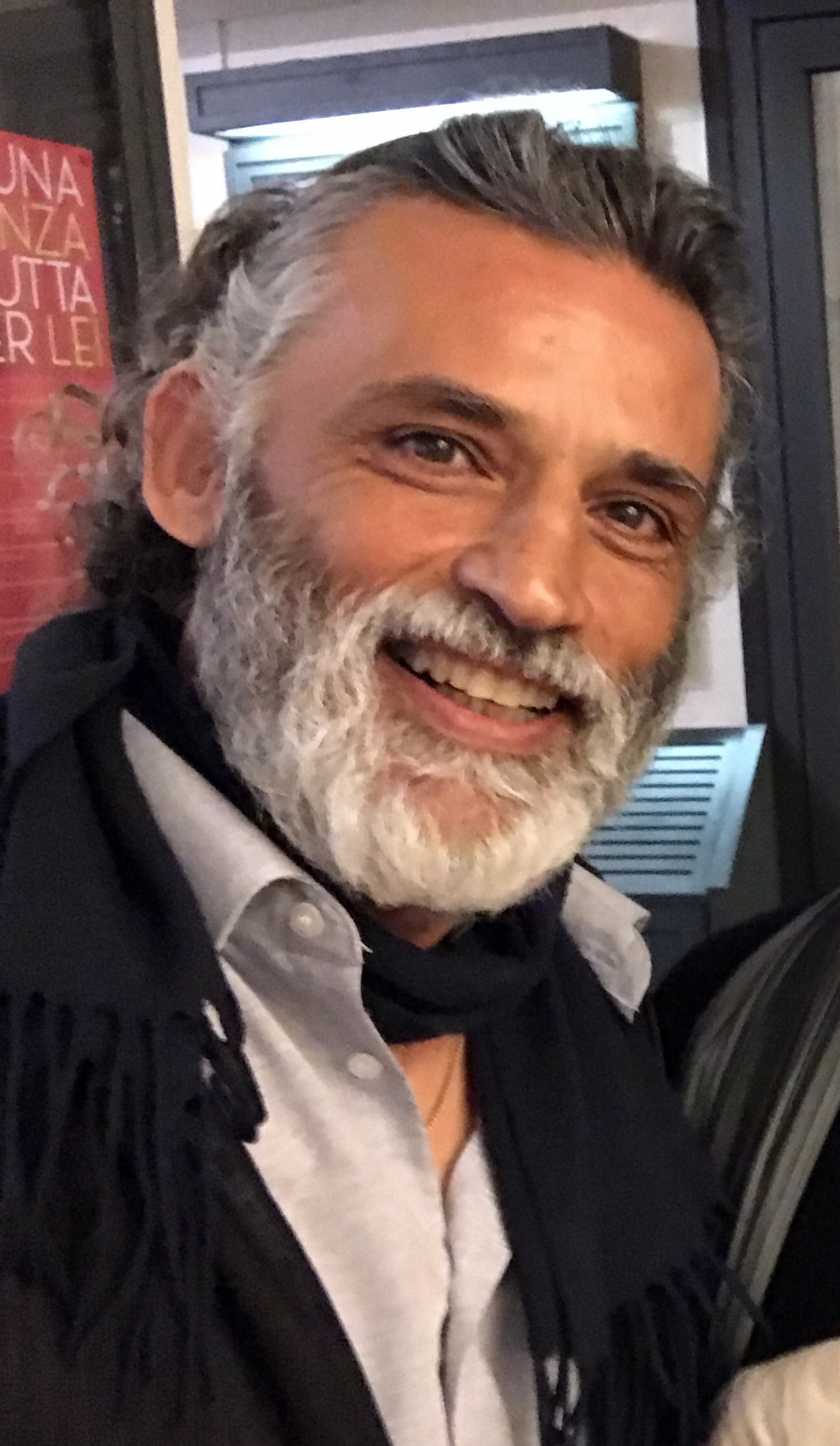
- Born: 18 January 1964 (age 61); Palermo, Italy

Enrico Lo Verso (born 18 January 1964) is an Italian actor.

He studied acting at Centro Sperimentale di Cinematografia and INDA - Istituto Nazionale del Dramma Antico.

== Filmography ==
=== Film ===
Year	Title	Role(s)	Notes
1990	Atto di dolore	Geraci	
1990	Nulla ci può fermare	Boy from Marocco	Cameo appearance
1991	Hudson Hawk	Apprentice	
1992	The Stolen Children	Antonio	
1992	Close Friends	Lucio	
1992	Volevamo essere gli U2	Rocco	
1993	The Escort	Andrea Corsale	
1993	Mario, Maria and Mario	Mario Della Rocca	
1994	Farinelli	Riccardo Broschi	
1994	Lamerica	Luigi	
1996	Bits and Pieces	Postman	Cameo appearance
1996	Come mi vuoi	Domenico / Desideria	
1997	Naja	Carmelo	
1998	The Way We Laughed	Giovanni	
1998	Of Lost Love	Dr. Satriano	
1999	Li chiamarono... briganti!	Carmine Crocco	
1999	Unruly	Gilles	
2001	Hannibal	Gnocco	
2002	L'amore imperfetto	Sergio	
2004	Three Days of Anarchy	Giuseppe	
2005	The Fine Art of Love	Inspector Gruber	
2006	Alatriste	Gualtiero Malatesta	
2006	Salvatore: This Is Life	Marco	
2007	13 Roses	Cánepa	
2007	Milano Parlermo - Il ritorno	Rocco Scalia	
2007	Il giorno, la notte. Poi l'alba	Mathematician	Cameo appearance
2007	La carta esferica	Nino Palermo	
2009	Baarìa	Minicu	
2010	La bella società	Nello	
2010	Room in Rome	Max	
2012	Il turno di notte lo fanno le stelle	Matteo	
2013	The Day of the Siege: September Eleven 1683	Kara Mustafa Pasha	
2015	Nomi e cognomi	Domenico Riva	
2016	Ustica	Dr. Morabito	
2017	Raffaello - Il principe delle arti in 3D	Giovanni Santi	
2018	Michelangelo: Infinito	Michelangelo	
2018	Sara's Notebook	Father Salvio	
2019	Il gatto e la luna	Sonia's friend	Cameo appearance
2020	Magari resto	Father Fabio	
2020	Rising High	Finance minister	Cameo appearance
2021	Venicephrenia	Giacomo	
2022	Dante	Donato degli Albazani	

=== Television ===
Year	Title	Role(s)	Notes
1990	Vendetta: Secrets of a Mafia Bride	Vito	Main role
1990	A Season of Giants	Sculptor	Episode: "Episode 1"
1995	Moses	Joshua	Main role
2000	Les Misérables	Marius Pontmercy	Main role
2001	Judas	Judas Iscariot	Television movie
2004	Posso chiamarti amore?	Turi Pietrangeli	Television movie
2006	The Inquiry	Saint Peter	Television movie
2008	Mogli in pezzi	Karim	Main role
2009	L'isola dei segreti	Luigi Grimaldi	Main role
2009	Inspector Rex	Concezio Soldati	Episode: "La scuola della paura"
2009	Il falco e la colomba	Armido	Main role
2010	La donna velata	Cesare Orsini	Television movie
2015	The Young Montalbano	Ettore Manganaro	Episode: "La stanza numero 2"
2015	Provaci ancora prof!	Michele	Episode: "Primo amore"
2016	Boris Giuliano: Un poliziotto a Palermo	Leonardo Vitale	Television movie
2017	Maltese	Luciano Consalvo	Episode: "Episode 1"
2019	Made in Italy	Ottavio Missone	Episode: "Three"
2022	The Bad Guy	Ernesto Lazardo	Recurring role
