= José Borjes =

Spanish soldier

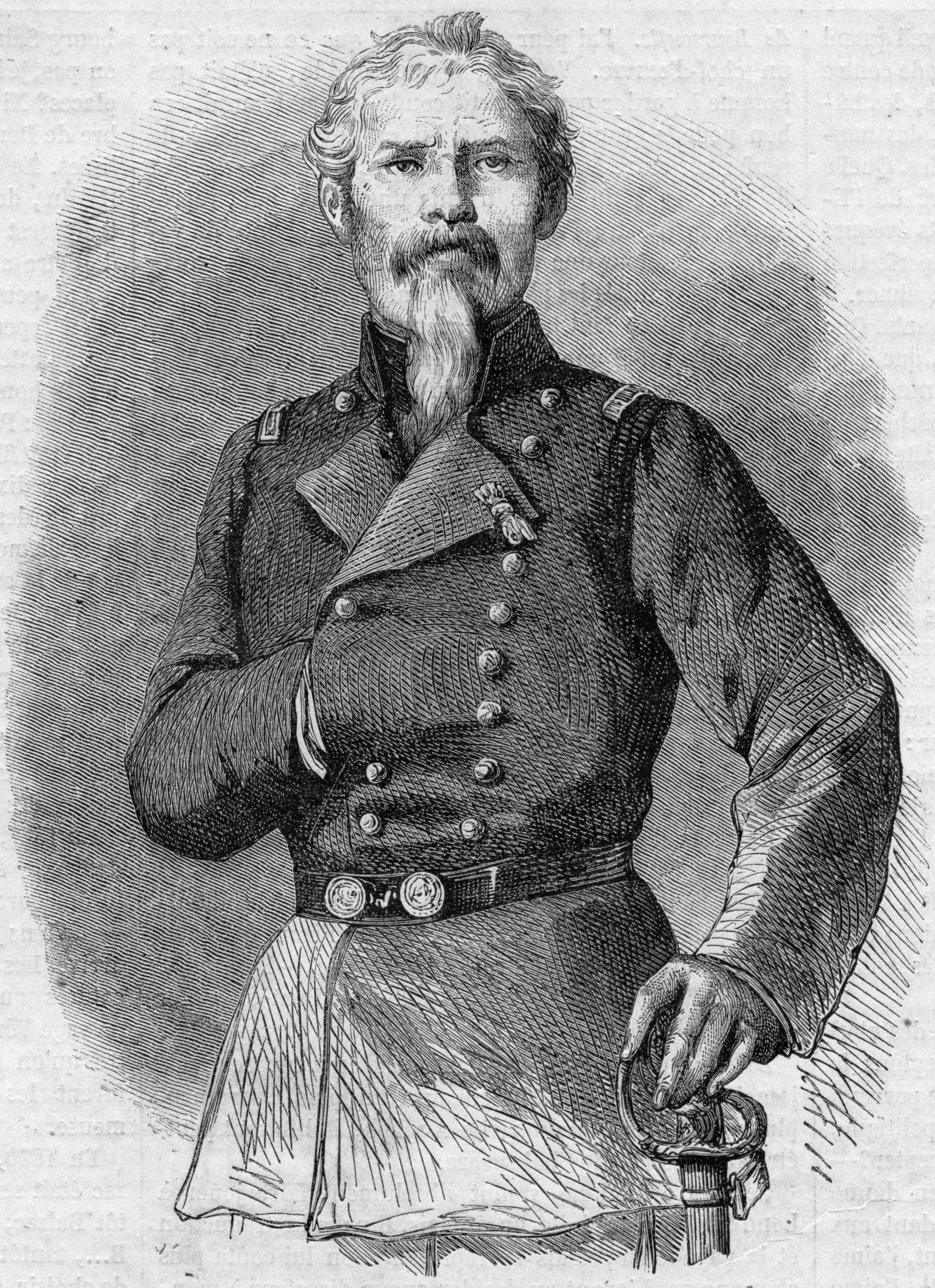
- José Borjes
- Born: 28 November 1812; Vernet (Artesa de Segre), Spain
- Died: 8 December 1861 (aged 49); Tagliacozzo, Kingdom of Italy
- Burial place: Church of the Gesù, Rome
- Military career
- Allegiance: Kingdom of Spain; Kingdom of the Two Sicilies
- Branch: Spanish Army; Army of the Two Sicilies
- Service years: 1833–1861
- Rank: Brigadier general
- Conflicts: First Carlist War; Second Carlist War; Post-unification Italian brigandage
- Awards: Royal Order of Francis I

José Borjes (28 November 1812 – 8 December 1861) was a Spanish general who fought on the Carlist side during the Carlist Wars. Later in his life he sided with Francis II of the Two Sicilies and fought against the unification of Italy.

== Biography ==
Born in a Catholic family, Borjes took part in the First Carlist War. During the war, he lost his father, who was shot in Cervera by colonel Don Cristino Niubó. Borjes was one of the closest collaborators of Carlos de Borbón and was promoted to the rank of colonel in 1839. After the armistice, he emigrated to Bourg-en-Bresse, in France.

He returned to Spain in 1847 and took part with the rank of brigadier general in the Second Carlist War. In 1848 he was appointed Commander-general of the province of Tarragona by Ramón Cabrera. The following year he was defeated by the liberal troops of General Quesada in Selma and was forced to go back to France.

In 1861 he was selected by General Clary, the Marseille-based leader of one of the secret committees that sought a Bourbon restoration in Southern Italy, to make a clandestine landing on the Italian coast.

Promoted to the rank of General, Borjes was entrusted with the task of making contact with elements loyal to the Bourbons and organising a general uprising to restore the Kingdom of the Two Sicilies. After a successful landing in Calabria, having found little support there for the Bourbon cause, Borjes embarked with his small company on a risky and adventurous journey into mountainous Basilicata in an attempt to establish contact with Carmine Crocco, the most famous leader of the Italian brigandage in the years following the Unification.

The goal of Borjes was the capitulation of Potenza, the most well-defended stronghold of the Italian army in Basilicata. Crocco did not trust Borjes from the start and worried about losing his leadership, but he accepted the alliance. Crocco, with the support of Borjes, conquered various towns searching for new recruits, including Trivigno, Calciano, Garaguso, Craco and Aliano. Crocco's army made its way to Potenza, occupying neighbouring cities such as Guardia Perticara, San Chirico Raparo and Vaglio, but the expedition to the main city failed because of a clash between Crocco and Borjes on the military campaign.

After other battles and retreating to Monticchio, one of his headquarters, Crocco broke the alliance with Borjes because he did not want to serve under a foreigner and did not believe the promise of the Bourbon government about the provision of reinforcements. Disappointed, Borjes planned to go to Rome, to inform King Francis II but, during the journey, he was captured in Tagliacozzo and shot by Italian soldiers headed by Major Enrico Franchini. Victor Hugo condemned his execution.

His body was buried in the Church of the Gesù in Rome. Throughout the expedition Borjes kept a journal in which he recorded the most notable actions fought in Calabria and Basilicata. Borjes's journal was first published by the Swiss writer Marc Monnier in his book entitled Historie du Brigandage dans l'Italie Méridionale (Paris 1862). The diary was translated into Spanish in the book Historia del bandolerismo y de la Camorra en la Italia meridional by Juan Mañé y Flaquer and Joaquín Mola Martínez.

== Bibliography ==
- Garnier, Charles (1861). Le Général Borgès. Paris: E. Dentu.
- Maffei, Andrea; Monnier, Marc (1865). Brigand life in Italy: a history of Bourbonist reaction. Vol. 1. London: Hurst and Blackett.
- Mañé i Flaquer, Joan; Mola i Martinez, Joaquim (1864). Historia del bandolerismo y de la Camorra en la Italia meridional. Barcelona: Imprenta i Llibreria de Salvador Manero.
- Croce, Benedetto (1927). "Il romanticismo legittimistico e la fine del Regno di Napoli". Uomini e cose della vecchia Italia. Bari: Laterza. pp. 316, 323–325, 329–331, 334, 336–337.
- Molfese, Franco (1983). Storia del brigantaggio dopo l'Unità. Milan: Feltrinelli.
- Crocco, Carmine (2008). Come divenni brigante. Brindisi: Edizioni Trabant. ISBN 978-88-96576-04-5.
- Pedrós i Puigarnau, Marcel·lí (1993). "Els Borges, uns carlins de Vernet". Jornades de Treball del Grup de Recerques de les Terres de Ponent: 85–90.
- Valentino, Romano (2018). Dalle Calabrie agli Abruzzi: Il generale Borges tra i banditi di re Francesco II. Nocera Superiore: D'Amico. ISBN 978-88-99821-64-7.
- DiMaria, Salvatore (2018). Towards a Unified Italy. Historical, Cultural, and Literary Perspectives on the Southern Question. New York: Palgrave Macmillan. ISBN 9783319907666.
- Martino, Giuseppe Antonio (2019). "Il generale Borges tra i briganti di re Francesco II". Quaderni del Sud-Quaderni Calabresi. LI (128).
- Spadaro, Carmela Maria (2020). "Brigantaggio e legittimismo nelle Calabrie. Josè Borjes e la tentata riconquista del Regno nel 1861" (PDF). Movimenti Insurrezionali e Legittimismo Postunitario Nella Calabria Reggina: 73–112. ISBN 9788890358753.
