= Post-unification Italian brigandage =

1861–1865 conflict in Southern Italy

Brigantaggio
- Part of the Italian unification
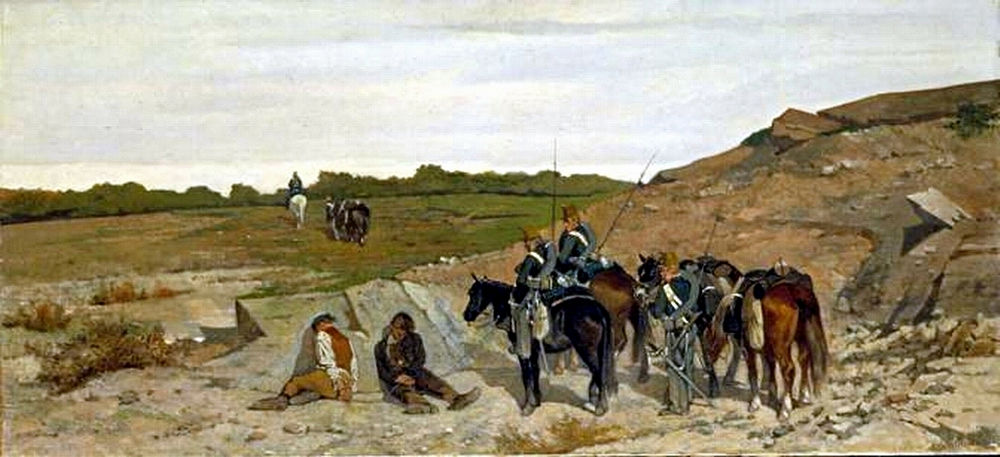
- An episode of brigandage in 1864
Date	1861–1865
Location	Southern Italy (former Kingdom of the two Sicilies)
Result	Unification victory

Belligerents
Kingdom of Italy	Southern Italian brigands Supported by: Bourbon Legitimists in Southern Italy; Partisans from Bourbon Spain

Commanders and leaders
Alfonso La Marmora; Enrico Cialdini	Carmine Crocco (POW); Vincenzo Mastronardi (executed); Ninco Nanco (executed); José Borjes (executed); Luigi Alonzi (executed); Michele La Rotonda (executed)

Casualties and losses
(1861–1864); 603 killed Including 21 officers 253 wounded 24 captured or missing	(1861–1864); 2,413 killed 2,768 captured 1,038 executed

Brigandage in Southern Italy (Italian: brigantaggio) had existed in some form since ancient times. However, its origins as outlaws targeting random travellers would evolve vastly later on to become a form of a political resistance movement, especially from the 19th century onward. During the time of the Napoleonic conquest of the Kingdom of Naples, the first signs of political resistance brigandage came to public light, as the Bourbon loyalists of the country refused to accept the new Bonapartist rulers and actively fought against them until the Bourbon monarchy had been reinstated. Some claim that the word brigandage is a euphemism for what was in fact a civil war.

== History ==
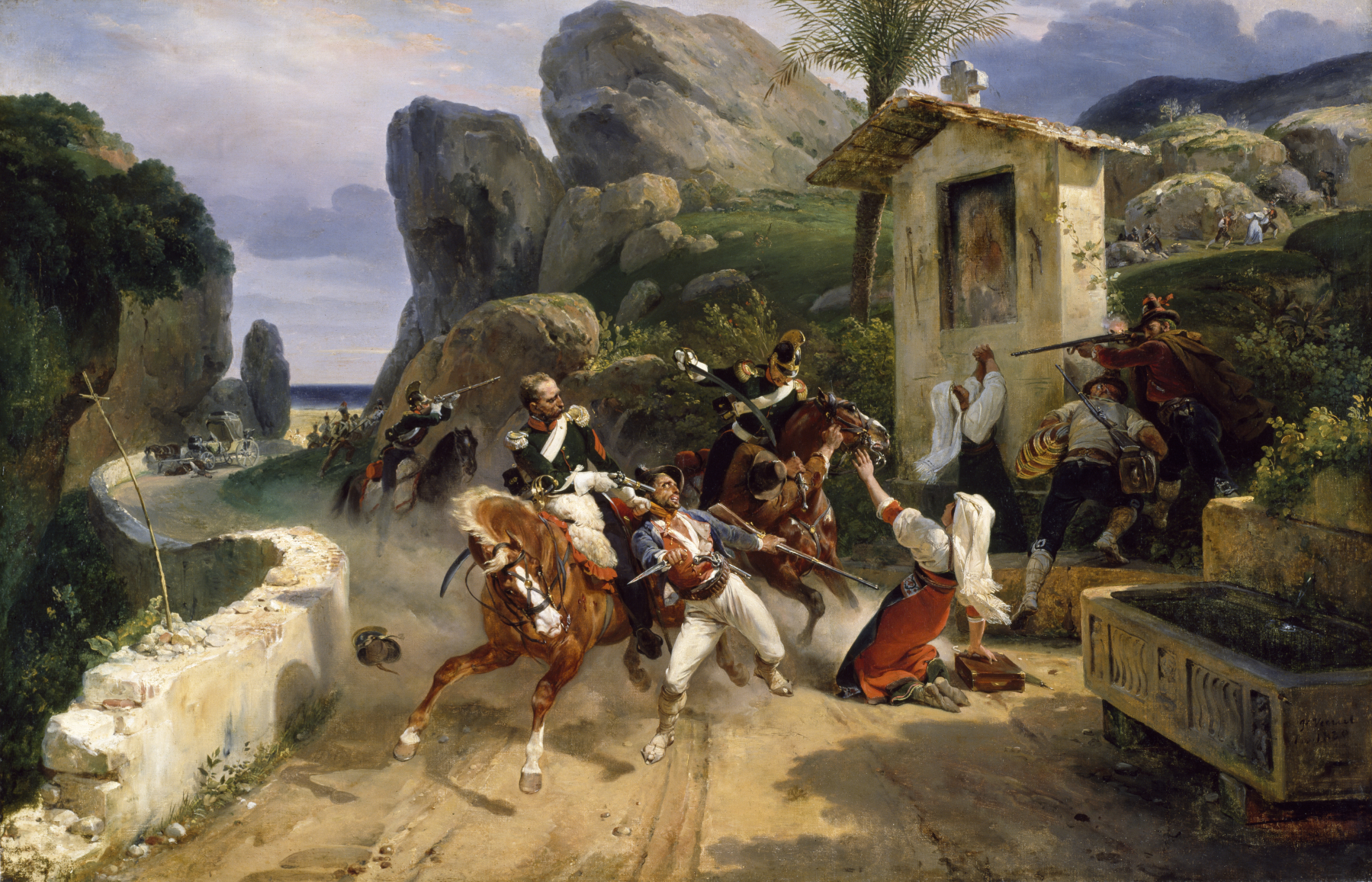
Brigands surprised by papal troops in the Roman Campagna. Painting by Horace Vernet från 1831

Following the upheaval during Sicily's transition out of feudalism in 1812, a lack of an effective police force made banditry a serious problem in much of rural Sicily during the 19th century. Rising food prices, the loss of public and church lands, and the loss of feudal common rights pushed many desperate peasants into banditry.

With no police to call upon, local elites in countryside towns recruited young men into "companies-at-arms" to hunt down thieves and negotiate the return of stolen property in exchange for a pardon for the thieves and a fee from the victims - a development that is often seen as the genesis of the Mafia. These companies-at-arms were often made up of former bandits and criminals, usually the most skilled and violent of them. While this saved communities the trouble of maintaining their own policemen, this may have made the companies-at-arms more inclined to collude with their former brethren rather than destroy them.

After the fall of the House of Bourbon's Kingdom of Two Sicilies and its merger with the House of Savoy's Kingdom of Sardinia in 1861, which created the Kingdom of Italy, the most famous form of brigandage emerged in Southern Italy. According to Marxist theoretician Nicola Zitara, Southern Italy experienced social unrest, especially among the lower classes, due to poor conditions and the fact that the unification of Italy had only benefited the land-owning bourgeoisie, so many turned to brigandage in the mountains of Basilicata, Campania, Calabria and Abruzzo. However, the brigands were not a homogeneous group, nor did they operate with any common cause. The brigands consisted of a mixture of people with different backgrounds and motives. They included former prisoners; bandits and other people who the Italian government regarded as common criminals; former soldiers and loyalists from the former Bourbon army; foreign mercenaries in the pay of the Bourbon king in exile; some nobility; poverty stricken farmers; and peasants who wanted land reforms. Both men and women took up arms.

Brigands launched attacks, not just against the Italian authorities and the landowners, but also against common people, frequently looting villages, towns and farms, and committing armed robberies against both individuals and groups, including farmers, townspeople and rival brigand bands. Robberies by brigand bands were often accompanied by other acts of violence and vandalism, such as arsons, murders, rapes, kidnappings, extortions and crop burnings.

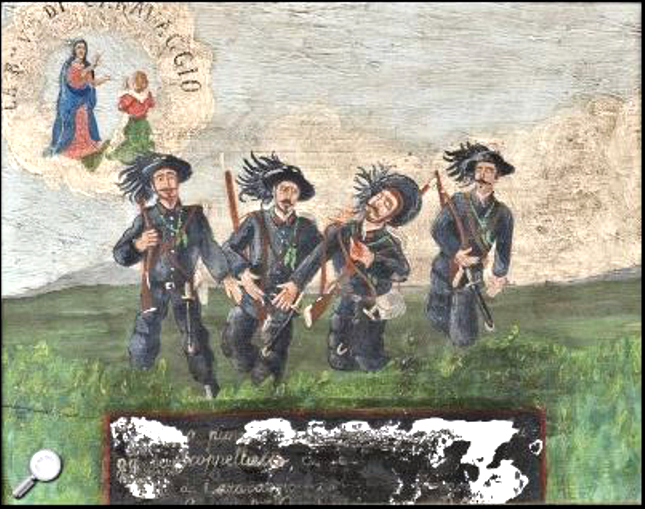
Ex-voto of a Bersagliere, wounded in the conflict but survived, dedicated to the Madonna of Caravaggio

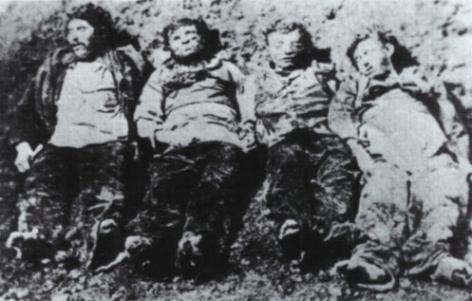
Executed brigands

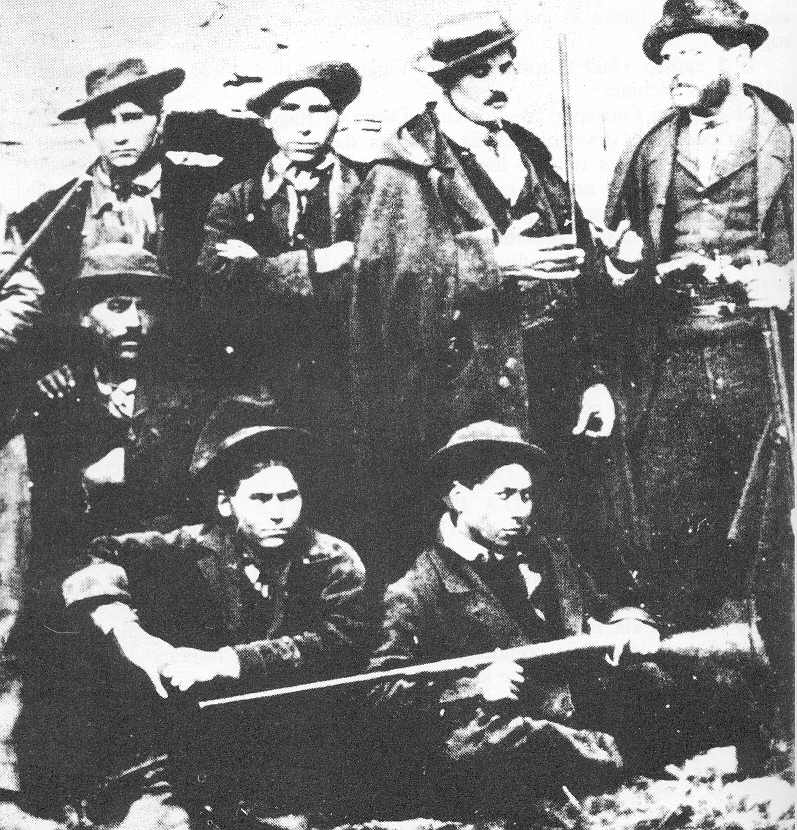
Band of the Brigand Totaro of San Fele

An extremely harsh repression of the brigands by the Italian authorities began in 1863, especially after the passing of the Pica Laws, which permitted the arrest of relatives and those suspected of collaborating or helping a brigand. The villages of Pontelandolfo and Casalduni in the Province of Benevento became the site of a massacre of 13 brigands by the Bersaglieri as a reprisal for the massacre of 45 Italian soldiers by local brigands. In total, several thousand brigands were arrested and executed, while many more were deported or fled the country (see Italian diaspora). In Palermo in 1866, 40,000 Italian soldiers were needed to put down the Seven and a Half Days Revolt.

An indication of the number of deaths during the conflict, including killings and other damages caused by brigandage, can be found in "Result of Operations", signed by colonel Bariola of the 6th Military Department in Naples, for the first nine months of 1863: 421 brigands had been killed in combat, 322 were shot by firing squad, 504 arrested and 250 surrendered. During the same period, the brigands killed 228 soldiers and wounded 94, killed 379 other persons and kidnapped 331, and killed or stole 1,821 head of cattle.

Whilst brigandage was virtually non-existent in the annexed states of northern and central Italy after the unification in 1861, such as the Kingdom of Lombardy–Venetia, the Duchy of Parma, the Duchy of Modena, the Grand Duchy of Tuscany and the Papal States, the situation in Southern Italy was very different, owing to the previous centuries of history. In his book Eroi e briganti (Heroes and brigands), the Italian historian and politician Francesco Saverio Nitti describes how brigandage was endemic in southern Italy already before 1860:

« … every part of Europe has had brigands and criminals who during wars and misfortune dominated the countryside and put themselves outside the law […] but there was only one country in Europe where brigandage has existed we can say always […] a country where brigandage for many centuries can look like a huge river of blood and hates […] a country where for centuries monarchy based itself on brigandage that became like a historical agent: this is the country of Midday » (from Italian “Mezzodì” or “Mezzogiorno”, the name for Southern Italy during the 19th century) .

There is a thesis that the brigandage in southern Italy was a popular revolt against Italian unification and the House of Savoy, but after 1865–1870 the brigandage movement was never followed by any anti-Savoy or anti-unification movement. Many southern Italians held high positions in the new Italian government, such as the 11th Prime Minister of Italy Francesco Crispi. Italians from southern Italy would also go on to play a key role in the ultra-nationalist Fascist movement, most notably the so-called 'philosopher of Fascism' Giovanni Gentile. The thesis that southern Italy was hostile to Savoy after the unification also does not explain the fact that in the referendum on 2 June 1946, about the creation of the Italian Republic, the south voted overwhelmingly for the Savoy monarchy, while the north voted for a republic, and from 1946 to 1972 the monarchist parties (which merged into the Italian Democratic Party of Monarchist Unity) were especially strong in the south and in Naples (a city in which nearly 80% supported the Savoy monarchy).

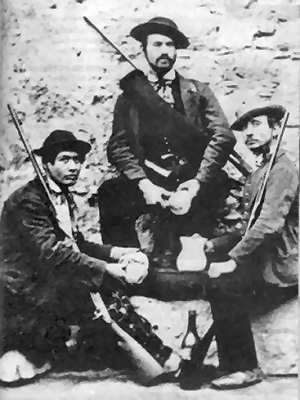
A small band of brigands from Bisaccia, photographed in 1862

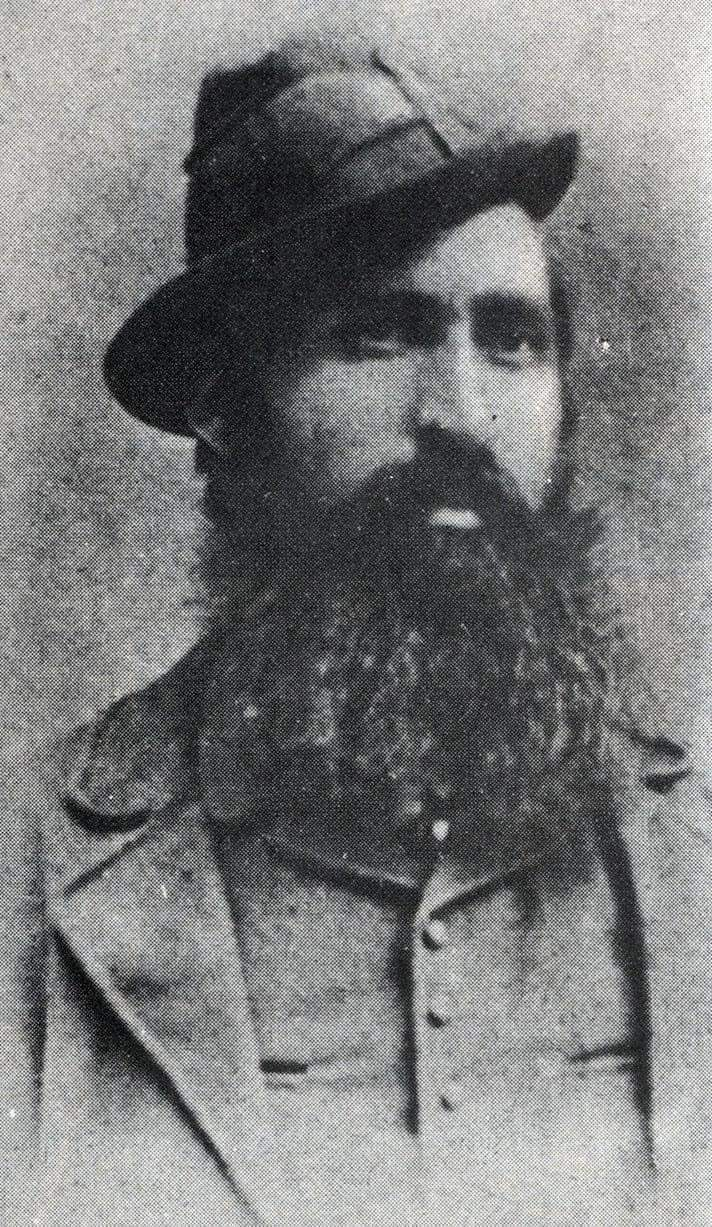
The brigand Carmine Crocco

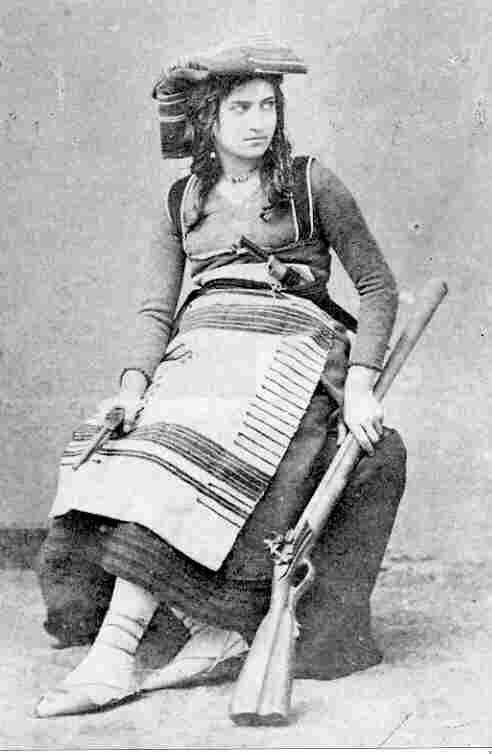
The brigand Michelina Di Cesare

Brigandage in Southern Italy would continue sporadically after the 1870s. Brigands such as Giuseppe Musolino and Francesco Paolo Varsallona, both operating at the turn of the 20th century, as well as Salvatore Giuliano and Gaspare Pisciotta, operating in Sicily from the 1940s to 1950s, all formed bands of brigands in Southern Italy and gained significant status as local folk heroes. Sardinian bandits and the Anonima sarda also continued to practice forms of brigandage into the 20th century.

== In popular culture ==
In 2024, Netflix released a series about Italian brigandage titled Brigands: The Quest for Gold.

== See also ==
- Carmine Crocco
- Ninco Nanco
- Nicola Napolitano
- Omertà
- Revolt of Montefalcione
- Sardinian banditry
