= National Guard (Kingdom of Italy) =

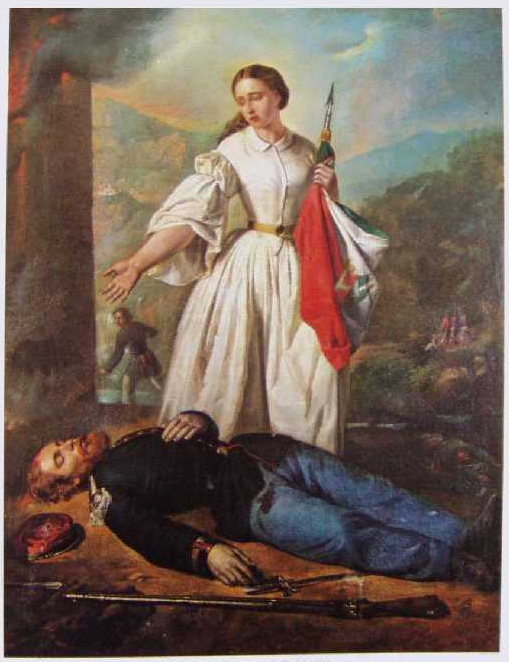
1860s painting depicting the allegory of Italy looking over the body of a Guardia Nazionale officer

The Italian National Guard (Italian: Guardia Nazionale) was a branch of service of the Royal Italian Army, established shortly after the unification of Italy with the primary goal of helping the regular army in the suppression of brigandage in southern Italy.

== Origins and establishment ==
All pre-unification Italian states established their own national guards, often modelled on the French Garde Nationale, between the end of the 18th century and the beginning of the 19th century; the first such example was created in 1797 by the French-controlled Cispadane Republic, followed by the Kingdom of Naples in 1806, the Papal States in 1831, the Grand Duchy of Tuscany in 1847, and the Kingdom of Sardinia in 1848.

During the Expedition of the Thousand, in May 1860, Giuseppe Garibaldi established a Sicilian National Militia as part of his Southern Army; the Militia was renamed National Guard in October 1860. A similar National Guard was created by Victor Emmanuel II in newly annexed Tuscany. In August 1861, five months after the establishment of the Kingdom of Italy, all regional and pre-unitary national guards were unified into a new National Guard, with a strength of 100,000 men and 220 battalions.

== Recruitment and roles ==
The new National Guard formally consisted of all citizens aged 21 to 55, with exemptions for schoolteachers, professors, postmen and clergymen; in practice, the units largely consisted of volunteers recruited among the liberal, pro-unification upper middle class of southern Italy. Citizens between 18 and 21 could volunteer with their parents' approval. A famous member of the National Guard was Sicilian writer Giovanni Verga, who served from 1860 to 1864.

The National Guard was chiefly tasked with garrison roles and the enforcement of public order. Detached units, called Guardia nazionale mobile (Mobile National Guard), were to be provided to augment the regular Army in the garrisoning of fortresses. They trained for one month every year and were available for mobilization for three months during peacetime, and indefinitely during wartime.

== Deployment and suppression ==
The National Guard mainly saw action during the campaign against brigandage in southern Italy, where its methods were judged harsh but effective. It was also mobilized in 1866 for action during the Third Italian War of Independence, but out of 36,000 members called up for service, only 25,000 showed up.

Attempts to reform the National Guard by assigning to it reserve officers of the regular Army were unsuccessful, and by the 1872, its main task fulfilled with the end of brigandage and the growth of the Royal Italian Army, discussion began for its disbandment. The National Guard was finally dissolved in 1876.
