= William John Charles Möens =

English writer (1833–1904)

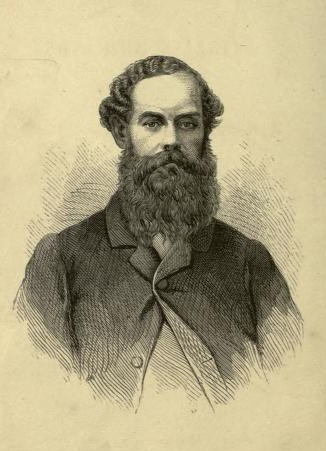
- 1866 engraving
- Born: 12 August 1833; Clapton, London, England
- Died: 6 January 1904 (aged 70); Hampshire, England
- Occupation: Writer
- Spouse: Anne (m. 1863)
- Relatives: David Charles Manners (great-nephew)

William John Charles Möens (12 August 1833 – 6 January 1904) was an English writer, known as an antiquarian dealing with Huguenot topics.

== Life ==
Born at Upper Clapton on 12 August 1833, he was the second son of Jacob Bernelot Möens, a Dutch merchant who settled young in London, and his wife Susan Baker, daughter of William Wright of the City of London, a solicitor. He was privately educated, began a career on the Stock Exchange, but soon retired to a house which he had bought at Boldre in Hampshire, taking up yachting, and later antiquarian researches.

== Kidnapping in the Campagna ==
In January 1865 Möens took a holiday in Sicily and Naples, and on 15 May, while returning from Paestum with a party including his wife, the Rev. John Cruger Murray Aynsley and Mrs. Aynsley, the two men were captured by a band of about 30 brigands near Battipaglia: Möens had been photographing the temples. Aynsley was released next morning, to negotiate a ransom of £8000. Möens remained with the brigands for four months, taken over the mountains in bad conditions, and shot at by Italian soldiers. On 26 August he was released, after paying £5100.

== Later life ==
Möens put the proceeds of his book about the kidnapping to building an infant school near Boldre. In 1867 he bought the estate of Tweed, also in Hampshire. Becoming interested himself in the New Forest, he studied forest law, and fought several battles for the commoners' rights. He supported the New Forest Pony Association and was a member of Hampshire County Council from its formation.

Möens died suddenly at Tweed on 6 January 1904, and was buried at Boldre church. By his will he divided his library between Hampshire County Council and the French Protestant Hospital, Victoria Park, London.

== Works ==
In January 1866 Möens published an account of his kidnapping, English Travellers and Italian Brigands. A new edition was called for in May, and the book was translated into several languages. In 1869 he sailed his steam yacht Cicada from Lymington up the River Rhine to Strasbourg, and by French canals to Paris and Le Havre. After a similar trip in 1870, he published Through France and Belgium by River and Canal in the Steam Yacht Ytene (1871).

Möens studied genealogy, especially that of Flemish families settled in England. In 1884 he edited The Baptismal, Marriage, and Burial Registers of the Dutch Church, Austin Friars. In 1885 he was one of the 12 founders of the Huguenot Society of London, where he read the first paper on 13 May, on The Sources of Huguenot History, and edited its early publications. He was elected a vice-president in 1888, and was president from 1899 to 1902. Becoming a Fellow of the Society of Antiquaries of London in 1886, he was appointed a local secretary, and was a member of the Hampshire Field Club and Archæological Society.

Möens edited also:

- The Walloons and their Church at Norwich: their History and Registers, 1565–1832, Lymington, 1887–8, with an historical introduction (which was reprinted separately with a new preface 1888; 150 copies).
- Chronic. Hist. der Nederland, Oorlogen, Troublen, 1888, an account of an anonymous work by Philip de St. Aldegonde, printed at Norwich in 1579 by Antony de Solemne, a Brabanter who came there in 1587 (reprinted from Archæologia, li. 205).
- Hampshire Allegations for Marriage Licences granted by the Bishop of Winchester, 1689 to 1837 (Harleian Society Publications, vol. 34), 1893.
- Registers of the French Church, Threadneedle St. (Huguenot Society), 1896.
- Register of Baptisms in the Dutch Church at Colchester from 1645 to 1728 (Huguenot Society), 1905.

He published pamphlets on the working of the Allotment Acts in 1890, and on the Local Government Act 1894 in that year.

== Family ==
Möens married on 3 August 1863 Anne, sixth daughter of Thomas Warlters, of Heathfield Park, Addington, but left no issue. They are the ancestral great-aunt and uncle of author David Charles Manners.

== See also ==
- List of kidnappings
- List of solved missing person cases: 1950–1999
- Dutch Church, Austin Friars
- French Protestant Church of London
- St Mary the Less, Norwich (L’Église Protestante Française de Norwich)

== Notes ==
Attribution

This article incorporates text from a publication now in the public domain: Lee, Sidney, ed. (1912). "Möens, William John Charles". Dictionary of National Biography (2nd supplement). Vol. 2. London: Smith, Elder & Co.
