= Marc Monnier =

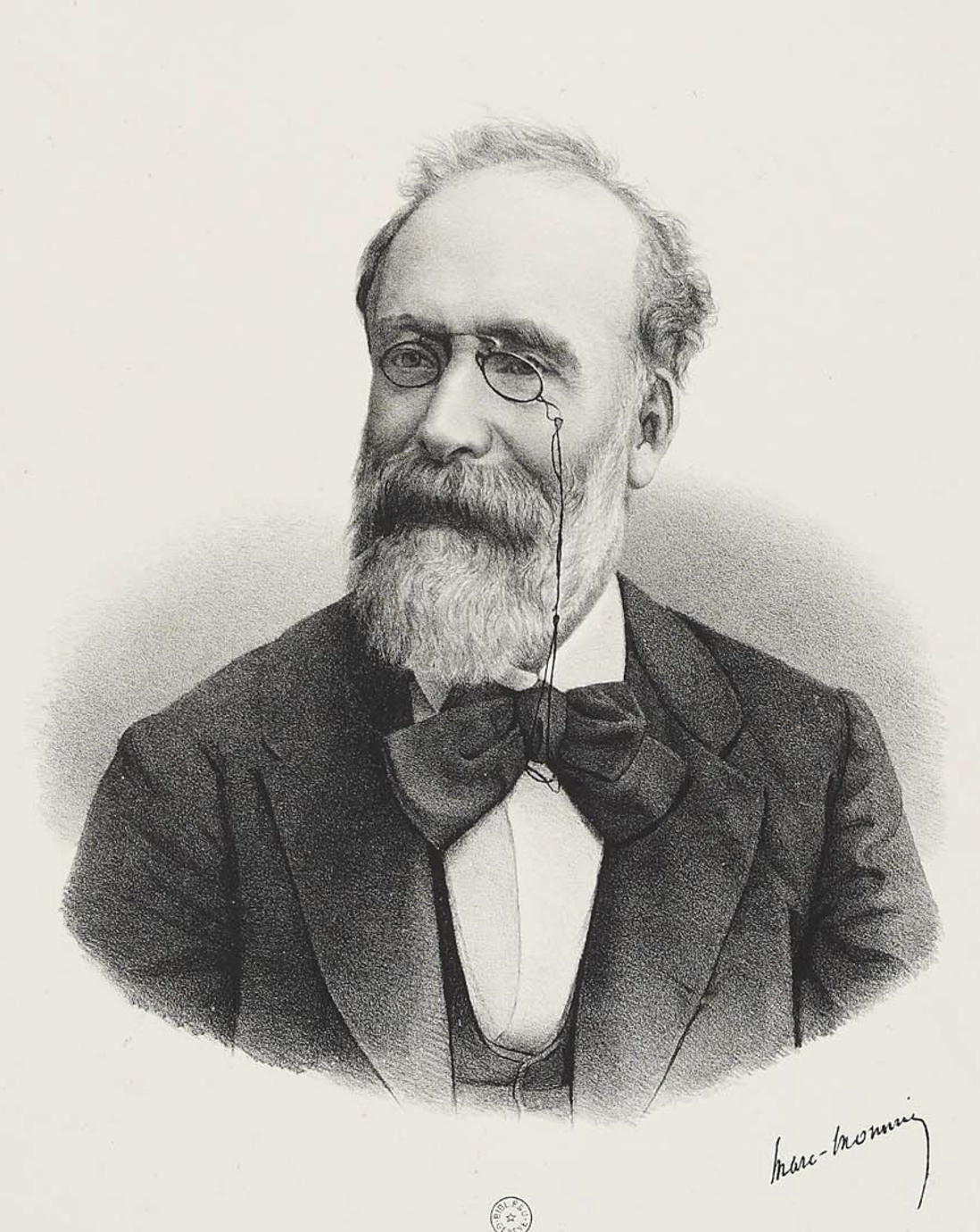
Marc Monnier

Marc Monnier (December 7, 1829 – April 18, 1885) was a Swiss writer.

== Life ==
Monnier was born at Florence. His father was French, and his mother a Genevese; he received his early education in Naples, he then studied in Paris and Geneva, and he completed his education at Heidelberg and Berlin. He became professor of comparative literature at Geneva, and eventually vice-rector of the university. He died at Geneva on April 18, 1885.

He wrote a series of short, satirical, dramatic sketches collected as Théâtre de marionettes (1871), and stories, notably Nouvelles napolitaines (1879), numerous works on Italian history, a translation of Goethe's Faust, Genève et ses poètes (1873), etc. The first volume of his Histoire de la littérature moderne, La Renaissance, de Dante a Luther (1884), was crowned by the French Academy.
