= Brigandage =

Life and practice of highway robbery and plunder

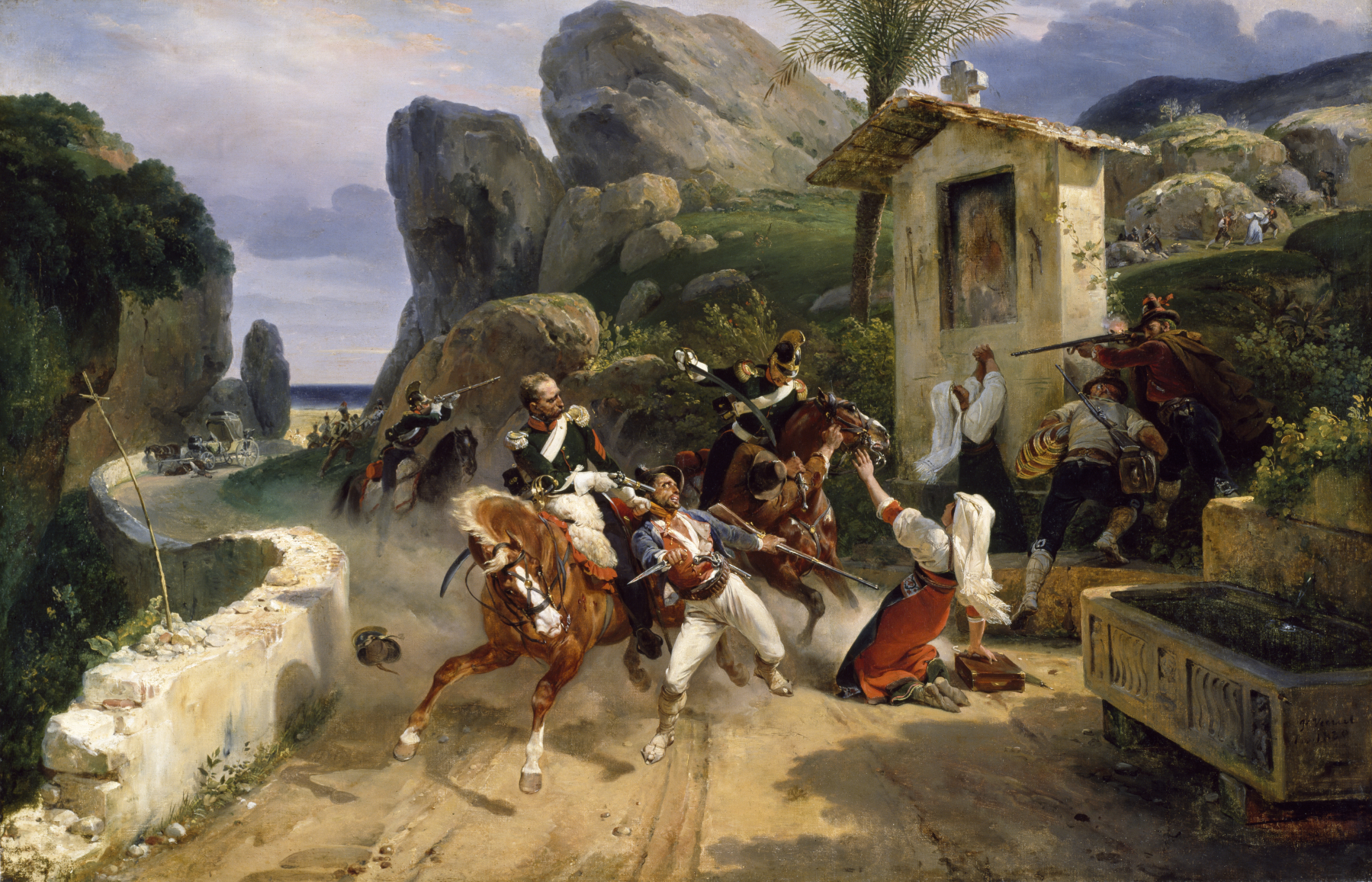
Italian Brigands Surprised by Papal Troops (Horace Vernet, 1831)

Brigandage is the life and practice of highway robbery and plunder. It is practiced by a brigand, a person who lives by pillage and robbery.

The word brigand entered English as brigant via French from Italian as early as 1400. Under the laws of war, soldiers acting on their own recognizance without operating in chain of command are brigands, liable to be tried under civilian laws as common criminals. However, on occasions brigands are not mere malefactors, but may be rebels against a state or union perceived as the enemy.

Bad administration and suitable terrain encourage the development of brigands. Historical examples of brigands (often called so by their enemies) have existed in territories of France, Greece and the Balkans, India, Italy, Mexico and Spain, as well as certain regions of the United States.

== Etymology ==
The English word brigant (also brigaunt) was introduced as early as 1400, via Old French brigand from Italian brigante "trooper, skirmisher, foot soldier". The Italian word is from a verb brigare "to brawl, fight" (whence also brigade).

For a bandito or bando, a man declared outlaw by proclamation, see the article Bandit.

== Laws of war ==
Towards the end of wars, irreconcilables may refuse to accept the loss of their cause, and may continue hostilities using irregular tactics. Upon capture by the victorious side, whether the capturing power has to recognize them as soldiers (who must be treated as prisoners of war) or as brigands (who can be tried under civilian law as common criminals) depends on whether the detainees "respect the laws and customs of war" and whether they operate within a chain of command and are "not persons acting on their own responsibility".

== Resistance ==
In certain conditions the brigand has not been a mere malefactor. Brigandage may be, and not infrequently has been, the last resort of a people subject to invasion.

The Calabrians who fought for Ferdinand I of the Two Sicilies, and the Spanish irregular levies, which maintained the national resistance against the French from 1808 to 1814, were called brigands by their enemies. "It is you who are the thieves", was the defense of the Calabrian who was tried as a brigand by a French court-martial during the reign of Joachim Murat in Naples.

In the Balkan peninsula, under Ottoman rule, the brigands (called klephts by the Greeks and hayduks or haydutzi by the Slavs) had some claim to believe themselves the representatives of their people against oppressors. The only approach to an attempt to maintain order was the permission given to part of the population to carry arms in order to repress the klephts. They were hence called armatoli. In fact the armatole tended to act more as allies than enemies of the klephts.

== Causes ==
The conditions which favor the development of brigandage may be summed up as bad administration (Note: [...] it would be going much too far to say that the absence of an efficient police is the sole cause of brigandage in countries not subject to foreign invasion, or where the state is not very feeble. [...] But there have been times and countries in which the law and its administration have been so far regarded as enemies by people who were not themselves criminals, that all who defied them have been sure of a measure of sympathy. Then and there it was that brigandage has flourished, and has been difficult to extirpate. — Hannay 1911, p. 563) and to a lesser degree, terrain that permits easy escape from the incumbents. (Note: "in a less degree, the possession of convenient hiding-places. A country of mountain and forest is favourable to the brigand. The highlands of Scotland supplied a safe refuge to the 'gentlemen reavers,' who carried off the cattle of the Sassenach landlords" (Hannay 1911, p. 564).)

The Scottish Marches supplied a theatre for the gentlemen reivers. After the Wars of the Three Kingdoms (1639–1651), policing the Scottish moss-troopers tied up many English soldiers of the occupying New Model Army. Their contemporaries in Ireland became known as "tories". Rapparees, Irish guerrillas of a later generation, fought for King James II after the Revolution of 1688 and on his defeat degenerated into brigands.

== Terrain ==
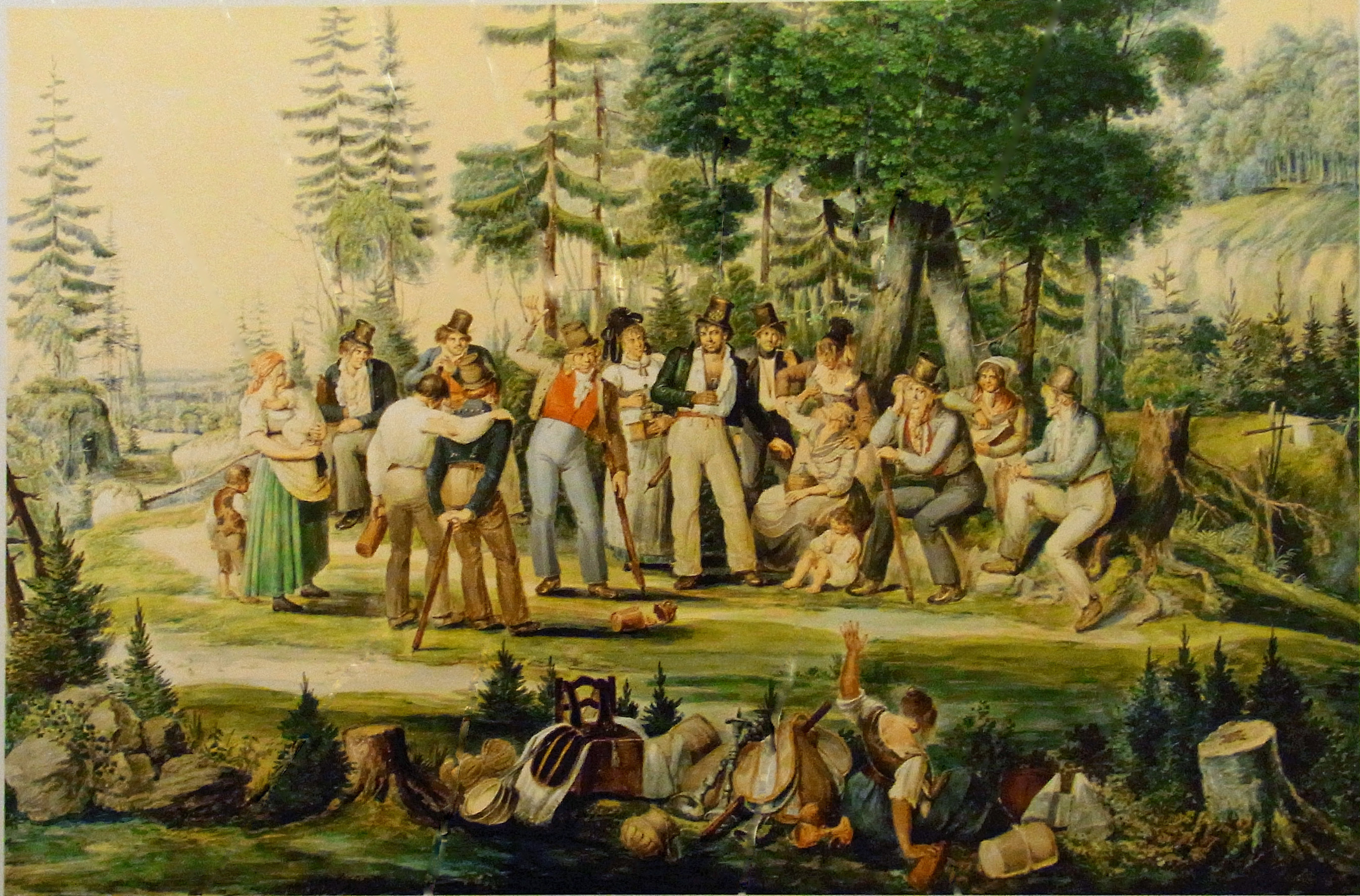
Xaver Hohenleiter and his robber band

The forests of England gave cover to the outlaws, who were flatteringly portrayed in the ballads of Robin Hood. The dense Maquis shrubland and hills of Corsica gave the Corsican brigand many advantages, just as the bush of Australia concealed the bushranger.

The Apennines, the mountains of Calabria, the Sierras of Spain, were the homes of the Italian banditi, and the Spanish bandoleros (member of a gang) and salteadores (raiders). The great haunts of brigands in Europe have been central and southern Italy and parts of Spain.

== Historical examples ==
=== England ===
During the reign of William III of England, "a fraternity of plunderers, thirty in number according to the lowest estimate, squatted near Waltham Cross under the shades of Epping Forest, and built themselves huts, from which they sallied forth with sword and pistol to bid passengers stand". The Gubbings (so called in contempt from the trimmings and refuse of fish) infested Devonshire for a generation from their headquarters near Brent Tor, on the edge of Dartmoor.

=== France ===
In France there were the Écorcheurs, or Skinners, in the 15th century, and the Chauffeurs around the time of the revolution. The first were large bands of discharged mercenary soldiers who pillaged the country. The second were ruffians who forced their victims to pay ransom by holding their feet in fires.

In the years preceding the French Revolution, the royal government was defied by the troops of smugglers and brigands known as faux saulniers, unauthorized salt-sellers, and gangs of poachers haunted the king's preserves round Paris. The salt monopoly and the excessive preservation of the game were so oppressive that the peasantry were provoked to violent resistance and to brigandage. The offenders enjoyed a large measure of public sympathy, and were warned or concealed by the population, even when they were not actively supported.

David Hannay writing in the 1911 edition of the Encyclopædia Britannica stated that in "Corsica the maquis has never been without its brigand hero, because industry has been stagnant, family feuds persist, and the government has never quite succeeded in persuading the people to support the law. The brigand is always a hero to at least one faction of Corsicans."

=== Greece and the Balkans ===
In 1870 an English party, consisting of Lord and Lady Muncaster, Mr Vyner, Mr Lloyd, Mr Herbert, and Count de Boyl, was captured at Oropos, near Marathon, and a ransom of £25,000 was demanded. Lord and Lady Muncaster were set at liberty to seek for the ransom, but the Greek government sent troops in pursuit of the brigands, and the other prisoners were then murdered.

In the Balkan peninsula, under Turkish rule, brigandage continued to exist in connection with Christian revolt against the Turks. In Bulgaria famous brigand like irregulars were the Haiduti and Haiduci. The difference between the two is somewhat nuanced but essentially the Haiduti robbed mainly prominent Ottoman Citizens, Ottoman Tax collectors and fought mainly the Ottoman Bazhi-Bouzouks and Ottoman Garrisons, at some points known for liberating villages around the Stara Planina mountain range. They usually had support from the local Bulgarian population. The Haiduci were considered brigands by both the Ottoman Sultanate and by most local populations being seen as less freedom fighters and more common bandits. Haiduts were active from the XVIIth to the XIXth century playing an active role in securing finances for the Bulgarian national movements.

=== India ===
The dacoits or brigands of India were of the same stamp as their European colleagues. The Pindaris were more than brigands, and the Thugs were a religious sect.

=== Italy ===
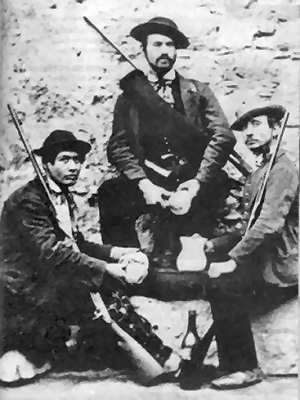
A small band of brigands from Bisaccia, photographed in 1862

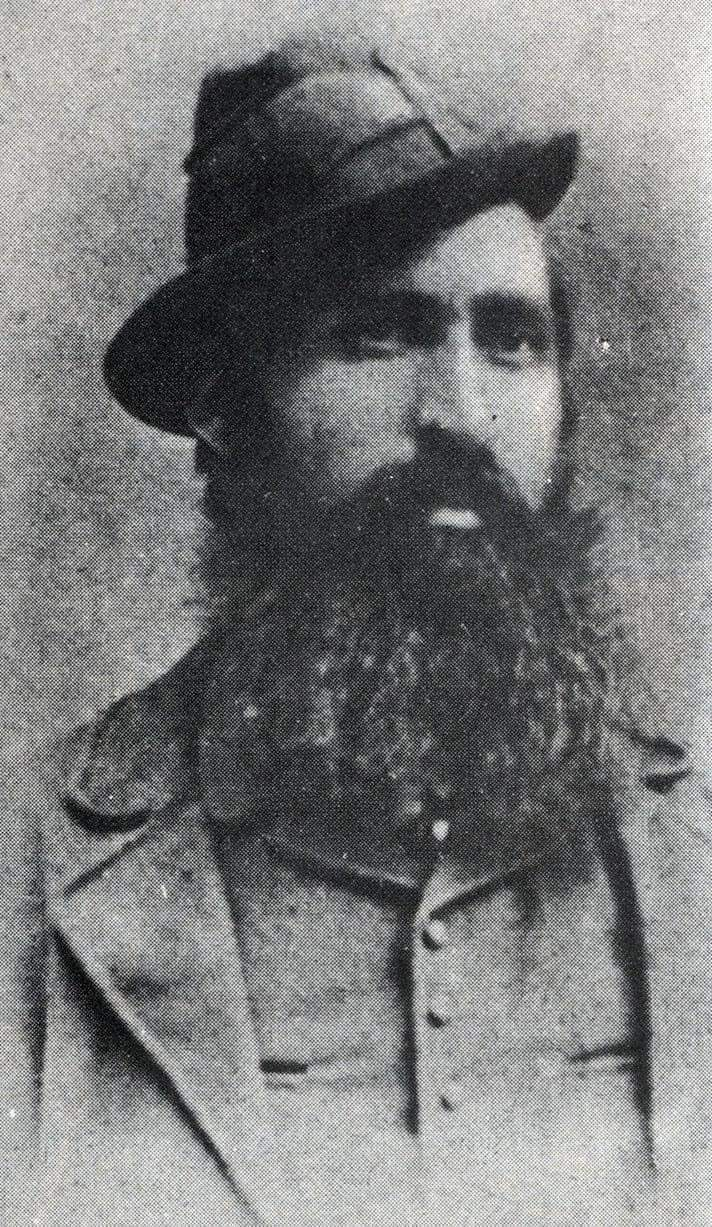
Carmine Crocco

Until the middle of the 19th century Italy was divided into small states; therefore, the brigand who was closely pursued in one could flee to another. Thus it was that Marco Sciarra of the Abruzzi, when hard pressed by the Spanish viceroy of Naples – just before and after 1600 – could cross the border of the papal states and return on a favourable opportunity. When pope and viceroy combined against him he took service with Venice, whence he communicated with his friends at home and paid them occasional visits. On one such visit he was led into a trap and slain.

Marco Sciarra was the follower and imitator of Benedetto Mangone, who was documented to have stopped a party of travellers which included Torquato Tasso. Sciarrae allowed them to pass unharmed out of his reverence for poets and poetry. Mangone was finally taken and beaten to death with hammers at Naples. He and his like are the heroes of much popular verse, written in ottava rima beginning with the traditional epic invocation to the muse. A fine example is The most beautiful history of the life and death of Pietro Mancino, chief of Banditi, which begins:

:"Io canto li ricatti, e il fiero ardire

Del gran Pietro Mancino fuoruscito
(Pietro Mancino that great outlawed man
I sing, and all his rage.)

In the Kingdom of Naples, every successive revolutionary disturbance saw a recrudescence of brigandage down to the unification of 1860–1861. The source of the trouble was the supporters of brigands (like Carmine Crocco from Basilicata, the most famous outlaw during the Italian unification) received from various kinds of manuténgoli (maintainers) – great men, corrupt officials, political parties, and the peasants who were terrorized, or who profited by selling the brigands food and clothes.

In the Campagna in 1866, two English travellers, William John Charles Möens and the Rev. John Cruger Murray Aynsley, were captured and held for ransom; Aynsley was released shortly thereafter. Möens found that the manuténgoli of the brigands among the peasants charged famine prices for food, and extortionate prices for clothes and cartridges.

=== Mexico ===
The Mexican brigand Juan Cortina made incursions into Texas before the American Civil War. In Mexico the "Rurales" ended brigandage.

=== Slovenia ===
In Slovenia the brigands (called Rokovnjači) were active especially in the mountainous Upper Carniola region in the 18th and 19th century. They were suppressed by the army in 1853.

=== Spain ===
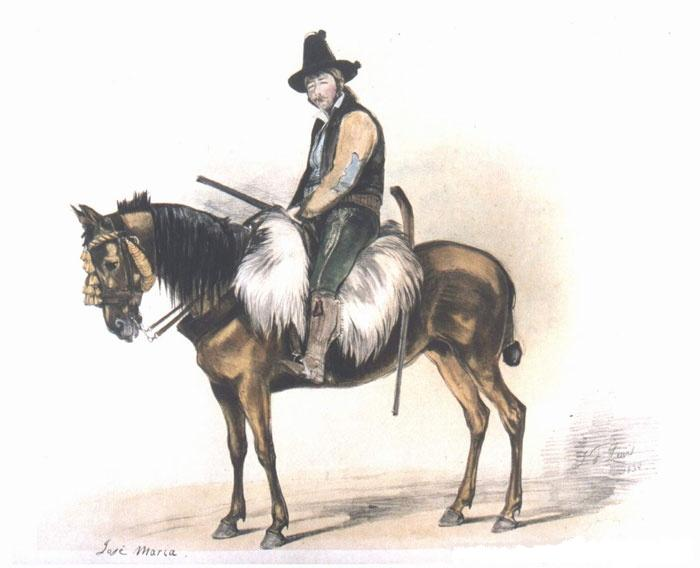
Jose María el Tempranillo, legendary Spanish brigand of the 19th century

In Spain brigandage was common in and south of the Sierra Morena. It reached its greatest heights in Andalusia. In Andalusia, the Sierra Morena, and the Serrania de Ronda, have produced the bandits whose achievements form the subject of popular ballads, such as Francisco Esteban El Guapo (Francis Stephen, the Buck or Dandy), Pedranza, &c. Jose Maria, called El Tempranillo (The Early Bird), was a liberal in the rising against Ferdinand VII, 1820–1823, then a smuggler, then a bandolero. He was finally bought off by the government and took a commission to suppress the other brigands. Jose Maria was at last shot by one of them, whom he was endeavouring to arrest.

In Catalonia, where brigands are called bandolers, it began in the strife of the peasants against the feudal exactions of the landlords. It had its traditional hero, Roc Guinart, who figures in the second part of Don Quixote. The revolt against the house of Austria in 1640 and the War of the Succession (1700–1714) greatly stimulated Catalan brigandage. A country gentleman named Pere Veciana, hereditary balio (military and civil lieutenant) of the archbishop of Tarragona in the town of Valls, armed his farm-servants and resisted the attacks of the brigands. With the help of neighbouring country gentlemen he formed a strong band, known as the Mossos (Boys) of Veciana, the precedent of current Catalan police, the Mossos d'Esquadra. The brigands combined to get rid of him by making an attack on the town of Valls, but were repulsed with great loss. The government of Philip V then commissioned Veciana to raise a special corps of police, the Esquadra de Catalunya. For five generations the colonel of the esquadra was always a Veciana. Since the organization of Guardia Civil by the Duke of Ahumada, about 1844, brigandage has been well kept down. At the close of the Carlist War in 1874 a few bands again infested Catalonia.

=== United States ===
In lightly-settled parts of the United States there was a considerable amount of brigandage when highwaymen were pervasive on the travel routes to the American West. Such outlaws, when captured, were often dealt with in an extra-legal manner by citizen vigilance committees, known as vigilantes. In the post-American Civil War period, many of these outlaws, such as the James-Younger gang, were former Confederate bushwhackers, irregular soldiers who continued their activities when the war was over and the South had been defeated. An example from an earlier era are the Harpe brothers, Loyalists during the American Revolutionary War who turned to brigandage after the war.

== See also ==
- Banditry in Chile
- Bushranger
- Cangaço
- Free company
- Ghazi (warrior), Bedouin military expeditions in pre-Islamic times
- Hajduk
- Outlaw
- Piracy
- Shifta
- Social bandit
- Thuggee
