= Parish Church of St Philip of Agira, Żebbuġ =

Parish Church of St Philip of Agira
- Knisja Arċipretali ta' San Filippu t'Aġġira
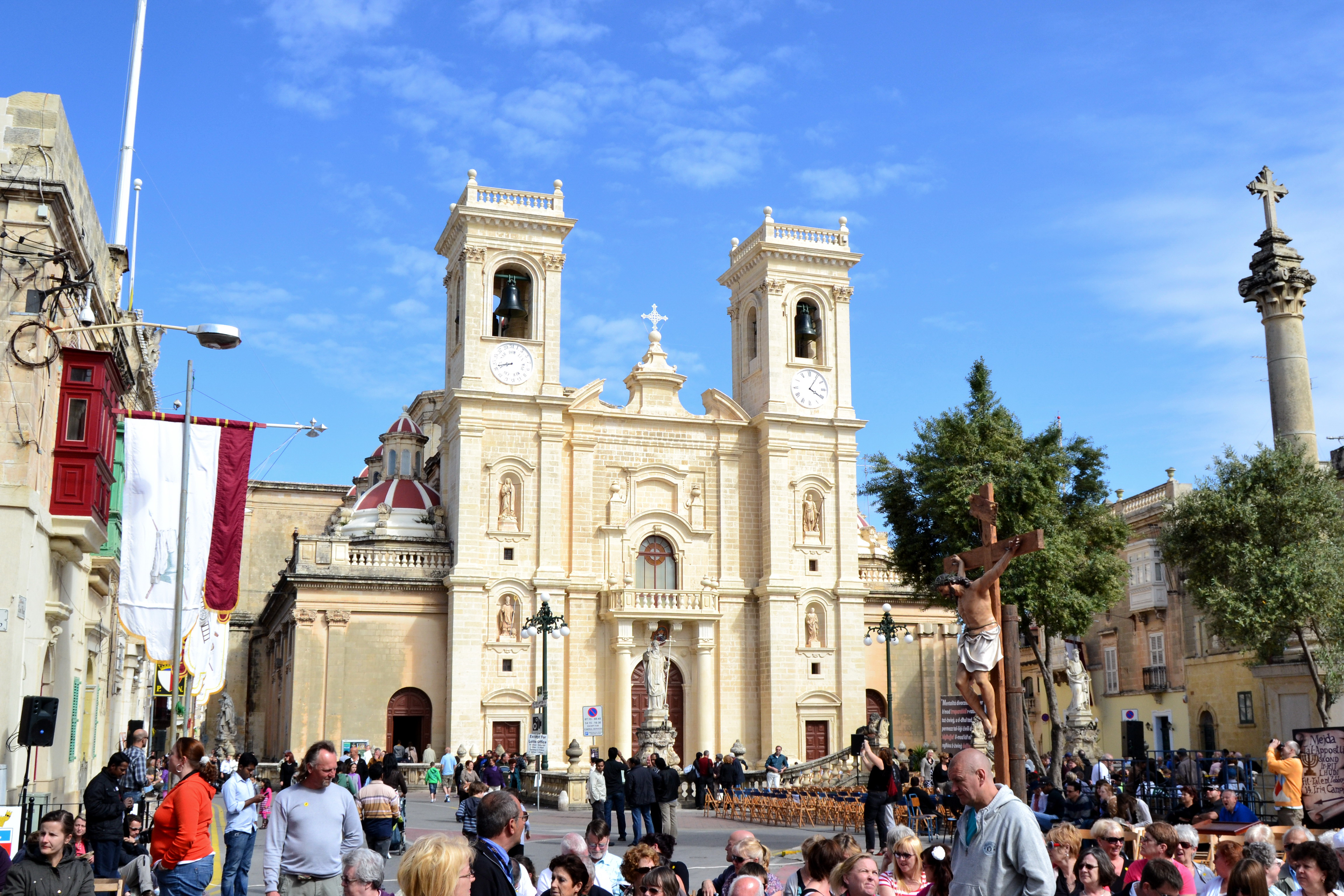
- The church's façade in 2011
- Parish Church of St Philip of Agira
- 35°52′16.9″N 14°26′31.9″E
- Location: Żebbuġ, Malta
- Denomination: Roman Catholic
- Website: www.parroccazebbugmalta.com

History
- Status: Active
- Founded: 1412
- Dedication: St Philip of Agira
- Dedicated: 13 May 1729

Architecture
- Functional status: Parish church
- Architectural type: Church
- Style: Baroque
- Years built: 1599–1632

Specifications
- Materials: Limestone

Administration
- Archdiocese: Malta
- Parish: Żebbuġ

The Parish Church of St Philip of Agira (Maltese: Knisja Arċipretali ta' San Filippu t'Aġġira) is a Roman Catholic parish church in Żebbuġ, Malta, dedicated to Saint Philip of Agira.

== Original Church ==
The original church was built on a land belonging to Filippo de Catania, a Sicilian entrepreneur, who also financed the construction of the same church in 1380. The land was in an area between three separate small villages known as Ħal Muxi, Ħal Dwin and Ħal Mula. By time these villages were merged to form present day Ħaż-Żebbuġ. The original medieval church was completed in 1412. The church was already a parish in 1436 since it was mentioned by Bishop Senatore de Mello as one of the 12 parish churches in Malta.

== Present Church ==
Following the Great Siege of Malta the people of Żebbuġ felt that a larger church had to be built to replace the now small parish church. The present church was built between 1599 and 1632 on plans attributed to Vittorio Cassar and was enlarged by the architect Tommaso Dingli in 1660. The same architect is said to have worked on the carving of the choir. The church was dedicated on 13 May 1729. The church was most modified in 1913 when the side aisles were added.

The church is listed on the National Inventory of the Cultural Property of the Maltese Islands.

== Works of Art ==
The titular statue of St Philip of Agira is made entirely of silver. In 1860, the people of Żebbuġ started collecting money which would enable them to order the titular statue which they wanted. The collection was so great that it was decided to build the statue in silver instead of the more usual wood. The statue was completed in 1864, by Luigi Fontana. When it was completed it was taken to the Vatican, where it was presented and blessed by Pope Pius IX.

The church also includes a number of beautiful paintings. Luca Garnier painted the titular painting above the high altar. It depicts St Philip of Agira performing a miracle while holding a cross towards a possessed man who is brought before him. Francesco Zahra, an 18th-century artist of the Favray school, painted two murals. Other treasures include works of art by Guido Reni and Antonio Sciortino, who hailed from the village.

== See also ==
- Culture of Malta
- History of Malta
- List of Churches in Malta
- Religion in Malta
