= Vitalis of Castronovo =

Christian hermit, recluse and monk (10th century)

Saint Vitalis of Castronovo
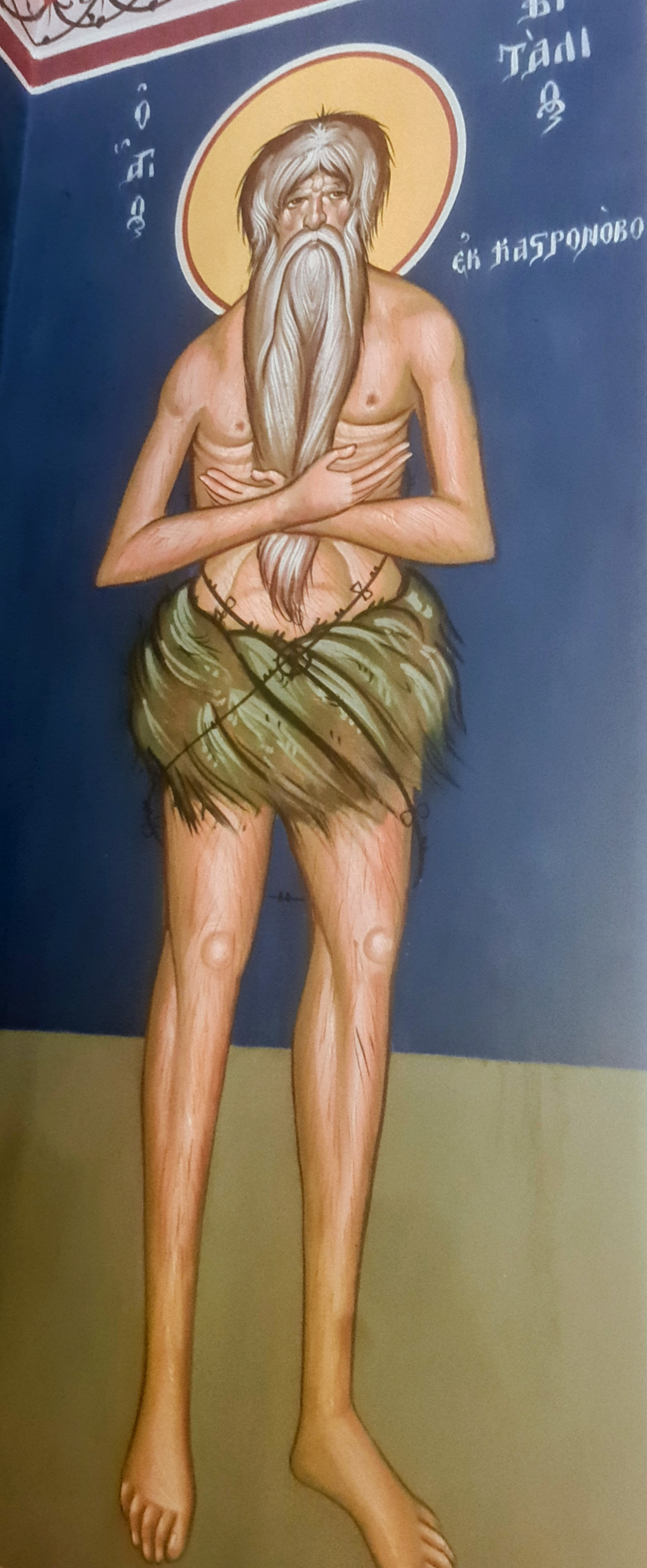
- Saint Vitalis of Castronovo, Fresco in the Greek-Orthodox Church of Seminara, Calabria

Hermit, Abbot, Monk
- Born: ca. 900; Castronovo di Sicilia, Sicily, Italy
- Died: March 9, 994 AD; Monte Vulture, Rapolla, Basilicata, Italy
- Venerated in: Catholic Church; Orthodox Church
- Major shrine: Castronovo di Sicilia and Armento, Basilicata
- Feast: 9 March
- Patronage: Castronovo di Sicilia, Sicily and Armento, Basilicata, Italy

Vitalis of Castronovo (Italian: San Vitale) was a 10th century Sicilian, Byzantine, Griko hermit, recluse, ascetic, abbot and saint who founded several monasteries in Basilicata and Calabria in the south of Italy (then Griko speaking parts of Byzantine Empire).

== Biography ==
Saint Vitalis was born in the Sicilian town of Castronovo di Sicilia in the 10 century to wealthy Byzantine family, to pious Griko parents, Sergius and Chrysonίkḗ. He was baptized in the then mother church of Maria Santissima dell'Udienza in Castronovo and educated in the faith by ecclesiastical tutors of the Greek rite: in that island environment, during the time of Arab domination, Christians enjoyed a certain autonomy in religious affairs.

However, he, uninterested in studies, developed a spiritual inclination that led him around 950 to become a Monk. He joined the Basilian Monastery of Saint Philip of Agira in ancient Agira, province of Enna, Sicily. Saint Philip Monastery of Agira is situated on the slopes of Etna Volcano, a breeding ground for many famous Calabrian and Sicilian ascetics of the 9th and 10th centuries. Here he received the Angelic Schema after living a life of asceticism, and by making progress in virtue for fifteen years.

Five years after his tonsure, with some brothers, he undertook a pilgrimage to holy places in Rome. During the journey, near Terracina (in Campania), a poisonous snake bit him, but he miraculously survived by making the sign of the cross on the wound. On the way back he decided to stop in the wilderness of Calabria and to live as a Hermit which he did for a period of 2 years on a hill near Santa Severina. He then returned to another Basilian monastery on Sicily, near the one in Agira for the next twelve years.

After 12 years as a monk at Agira Convent, he withdrew into the Hermitage in the wilderness of Calabria, engaging in further ascetical struggles on the mountain of Lipirachi (Liporachos in Greek, modern Monte Lipiricchio near Reggio di Calabria). Near Cassano he met the ascetic Anthony, who lived a very strict life in a cave (abbot of Locri Monastery) and stayed with him for a short time. He later went to live in a secluded place in the region of Capo Spulico, overlooking the sea. Its isolation made it a haven for criminals, however. Here at Pietra Roseti on the border with Lucania, Vitalis chased away criminals from a decaying house and transformed the place into a monastic community. Saint Vitalis brought back a climate of peace and cordiality, and the residents of those lands in Roseto gratefully built a church, dedicating it to Saint Basil. A miracle is also recorded from this period, in which he prayed for the crops threatened by a flood, which ultimately yielded beneficial fruits. He then moved to the 'Mercurion' and the 'Latinianon' in Lucania, organized local monastic communities, and began to travel throughout the region, founding monasteries in various places and comforting monks distressed by the recurring Arab invasions.

During those years, he changed his hermitage several times (Mount Rapparo, Sant'Angelo d'Asprono, Mount San Giuliano), each new location attracting new disciples for whom he founded various Monasteries, until at last he settled in the monastery of Saint Elias at Carbone in nearby Basilicata.

After several years, he went to a cave between the mountains of Torri and Armento in Basilicata. Here in a cave near Armento the hermit struggled day and night, praying and ascending to great spiritual heights. Even the wild beasts of the mountain approached him docilely in order to receive his blessing. His familiarity with animals became proverbial, as noted in a short Sicilian folk song from Castronovo: "Santu Vitali / Fedda di Pani / E di lu riestu/ Nni duna a li cani" (Holy Life / Slice of Bread / And the Rest / Gives to the dogs)". There he was visited by Saint Luke of Demena of Sicily with whom he prayed and discussed spiritual matters.

On various occasions, he turned to God, with success, asking him to remedy needs of varying degrees of seriousness.

Together with two other holy monks, he also travelled to Bari, where he was received by the Catapan Basil in 979. The biographer reports that the miraculous events linked to Vitalis' life continued when the governor of the Byzantine province of Bari summoned Vitalis, given his fame, to meet him. Vitalis went to the man: he heard his confession, and during his stay, he also worked a miracle in Bari, preventing a violent storm from causing damage.

In 979 he returned to Calabria and restored (damaged by Saracenes) the Convent and the Church of Saint Adrian and Natalia in San Demetrio Corone. When this Monastery was attacked by the Saracens, fearing the worst, Saint Vitalis's brothers fled to safety, but Vitalis remained to face them. When one of the Muslims was about to kill him, he was struck by lightning, causing him to drop his scimitar and collapse, suffering from sudden pain. Vitalis ensured that his attacker was healed, and, by warning them, the attackers withdrew from those lands.

This point became a great reference for the faithful who saw the imprint of sanctity in Saint Vitale's actions. Those who turned to him with sincerity were always welcomed and recommended to the assistance of divine grace (such as, for example, a man who was granted children), and in particular, those who had fallen into error had the opportunity to amend their ways and free themselves from punishment (such as, in another example, the liar who had mispronounced the name of God).

With the help of his nephew Blessed Elias of Castronovo, he build the Church of Torri on Monte Torretta di Pietragalla (Mountain peak in the Apennines, 1587 meters high) and founded the Monastery at Monte Vulture in Rapolla, both in Basilicata where he settled.

== Ascetic practices: immersion in frozen ponds ==
Meanwhile, the fame of the miracles that God worked through the intercession of His Servant was drawing great crowds to the Monastery, interrupting the holy idleness of its contemplation. Therefore, taking with him his nephew and disciple named Elias, who had long since departed from Sicily, he went to live near the river in the city of Rapolla. Here, in a solitary place, he resumed his customary penances of passing the nights, sometimes immersed in frozen ponds, sometimes praying in the mountains, and undergoing the other hardships described above."

== Repose ==
The final abode of Saint Vitalius was in the region of Rapolla, where he built a monastery Monastery on Monte Vulture (1,326 meters high volcano) near Rapolla. There he spent the rest of his life, gathering a multitude of monks around him.

He died at his Monastery on Monte Vulture, volcano near Rapolla in Basilicata, Italy on 9 March 994 AD, after having appointed a new abbot.

== Veneration ==
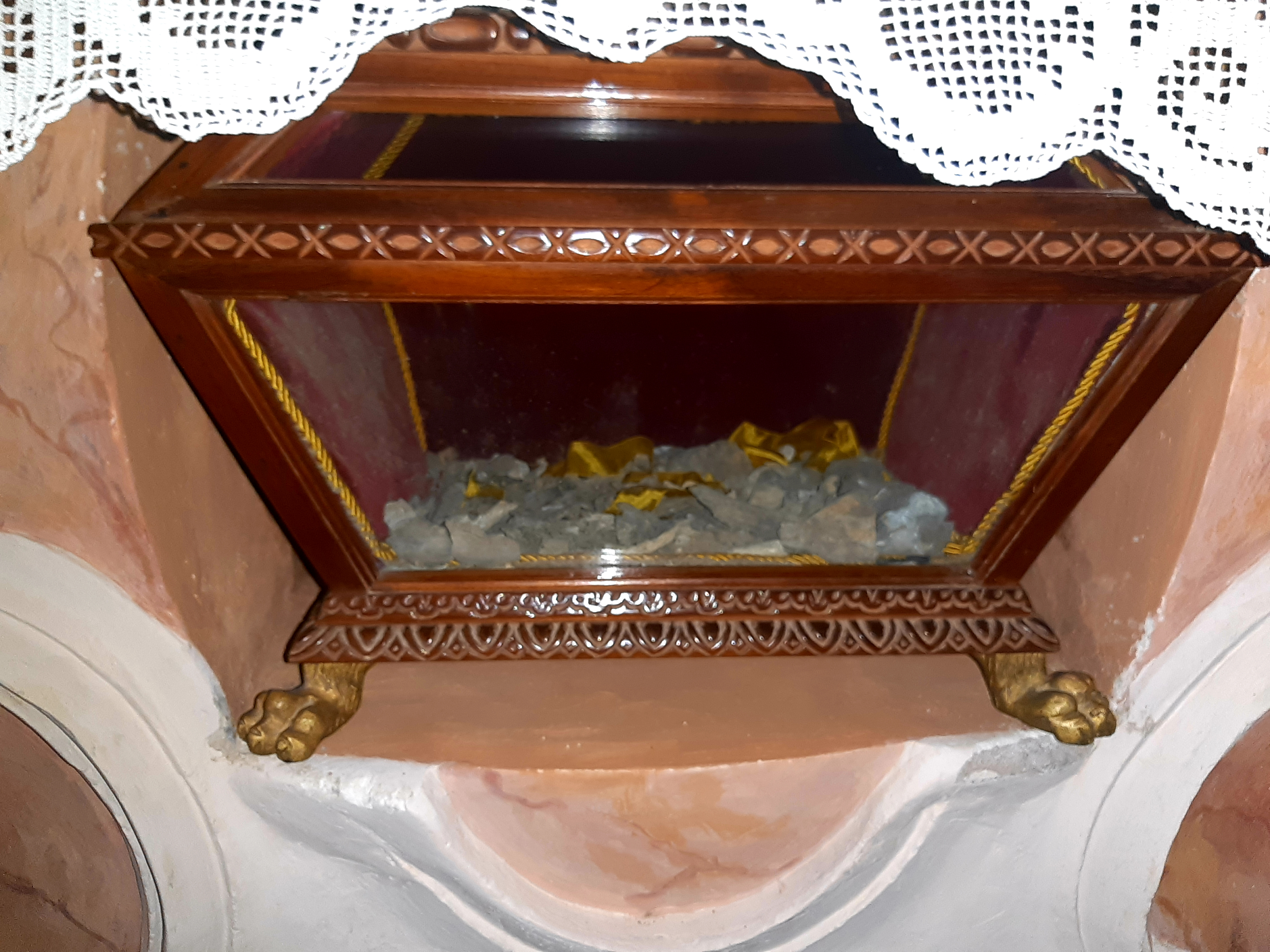
Relics of Saint Vitalis of Castronovo on Armento, Basilicata, South Italy

Biography of Saint Vitalis was written in Greek by a contemporary Basilian Monk and was translated into Latin a century later, liturgical use in 1194 and dedicated to Robert, Bishop of Tricarico.

His remains were initially buried in the church of the convent at Monte Vulture where he died, near Rapolla. In 1024, they were transferred to another monastery (Guardia Perticara, whose abbot was his nephew Elia). From there, they were moved to Torri on Monte Torretta (to protect it from Muslim attacks) and then to Armento (by order of the feudal lord of that territory, who had it placed next to that of Saint Luke of Demenna. Both were then placed in the cathedral in Tricarico (in the province of Matera). Finally, the remains of San Vitale were returned to Armento, where they are kept in a reliquary bearing the inscription "SANCTI VITALIS RELIQUIAE" (a convent of Basilian monks was erected in this town in the year of his death).

Vitalis is honoured as the principal patron saint of the cities of Castronovo, Sicily and of Armento, Italy.

The feast day of Saint Vitalis is March 9 (Orthodox Church).

The village of Castronuovo di Sant'Andrea, in the province of Potenza, near Armento, Basilicata, owes its foundation and its name to Saint Vitalis, as he was mindful of his native city (the specification "of Sant'Andrea" was added centuries later).

== Associated places ==
- Saint Philip Monastery in Agira, Sicily, where Vitalis became a monk
- Saint Micheal Abbey in Monticchio, near Rapolla - Monastery at Monte Vulture where the saint lived and died. The large cave on Monte Vulture, perched above the small lake, was inhabited by Greek Monks, their presence being confirmed by a small oratory behind the current altar of Saint Michael at Saint Michael Abbey.
