= San Salvatore, Agira =

12th-century Catholic church

Coordinates: 37.65635°N 14.52833°E

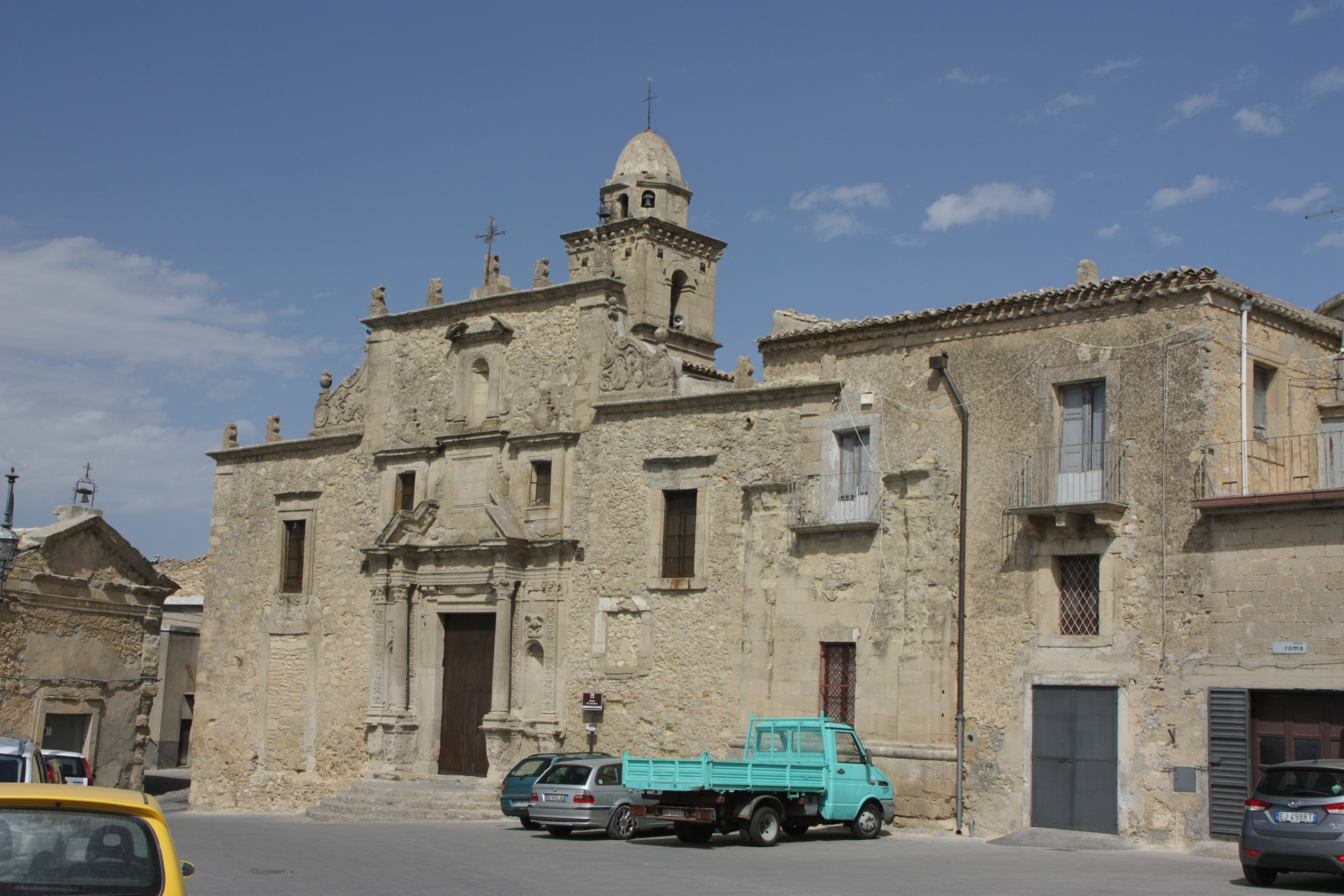
Facade and bell-tower of San Salvatore, to the left of the facade is the small church of Santa Croce

San Salvatore is a Roman Catholic church (or oratory) located in the town of Agira, province of Enna, region of Sicily, Italy.

== History ==
This church was originally erected by the end of the 12th century in an area where putatively stood the forum of the ancient Roman town. It was erected near the walls and the castle of the early medieval town. It was administered by the Abbey of San Filippo, as documented by 1170. By the late 16th century, it housed a red velvet casket containing putative sacred relics of the town, brought here by monks fleeing Muslim persecution in Jerusalem. In 1689, the then Bishop of Catania, Francesco Carafa, raised the church to a collegiate church, a role which was further expanded in 1787 by bishop Corrado Maria Deodato. Attached to this church was a small church of Santa Croce, formerly a synagogue, which was used to house the burial tomb of fra Frabritio da Sinagra (1560-1612, also known as Beato Diego). The church was also privileged to sponsor the religious processions of Holy Friday, Pentecost, and a procession led on May 1 dedicated to San Filippo Diacono (Philip of Agira).

The church underwent significant reconstruction after the 1693 Sicily earthquake. The bell-tower base retains some of the Norman architecture, but now has a rounded roof. To the flat and rustic facade of the original church, a baroque portal and roofline spires were added in the 16th and 17th centuries. The inner space is divided into a central nave and lateral aisles by a series of columns. The columns have richly decorated capitals. To the left of the nave is the chapel dedicated to San Filippo Diacono of Palermo (also called san Filippu u nicu or San Fulippuzzu). The decorative altar with alabaster elements dates to the 16th century. In the right nave, is an 18th-century altarpiece dedicated to the Madonna del Rosario painted in the style of Filippo Randazzo. The church also has a likely 14th-century wooden icon depicting San Filippo.
