= Armento =

- Comune
- Comune di Armento
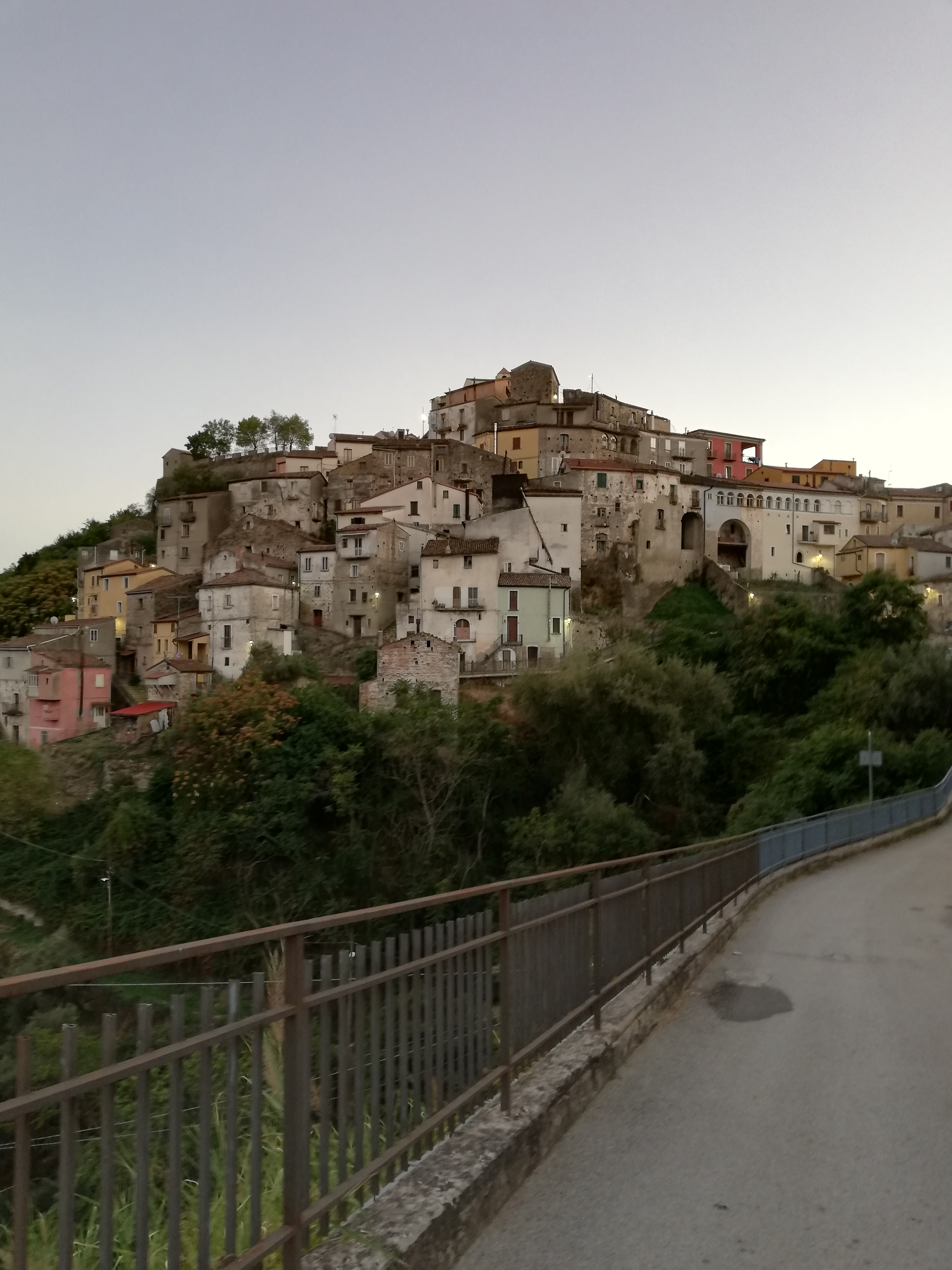
- View of Armento

- Location within Italy Location within Basilicata
- Coordinates: 40°18′N 16°4′E
- Country: Italy
- Region: Basilicata
- Province: Potenza (PZ)

Area
  - Total: 58.5 km^{2} (22.6 sq mi)
- Elevation: 710 m (2,330 ft)

Population (31 December 2006)
  - Total: 721
  - Density: 12.3/km^{2} (31.9/sq mi)
- Demonym: Armentesi
- Time zone: UTC+1 (CET)
  - Summer (DST): UTC+2 (CEST)
- Postal code: 85010
- Dialing code: 0971
- ISTAT code: 076005
- Patron saint: Madonna della Stella, Vitalis of Castronovo
- Website: Official website

Armento (Lucano: Arëmient) is a town and comune in the province of Potenza, in the Southern Italian region of Basilicata. The Armento Rider was found in the vicinity of Armento and is now in the British Museum. The Kritonios Crown, a 4th-century BC gold wreath representing a crown of convolvulus, narcissus, ivy, roses, and myrtle was found there in the 19th century and is now in the Staatliche Antikensammlungen.

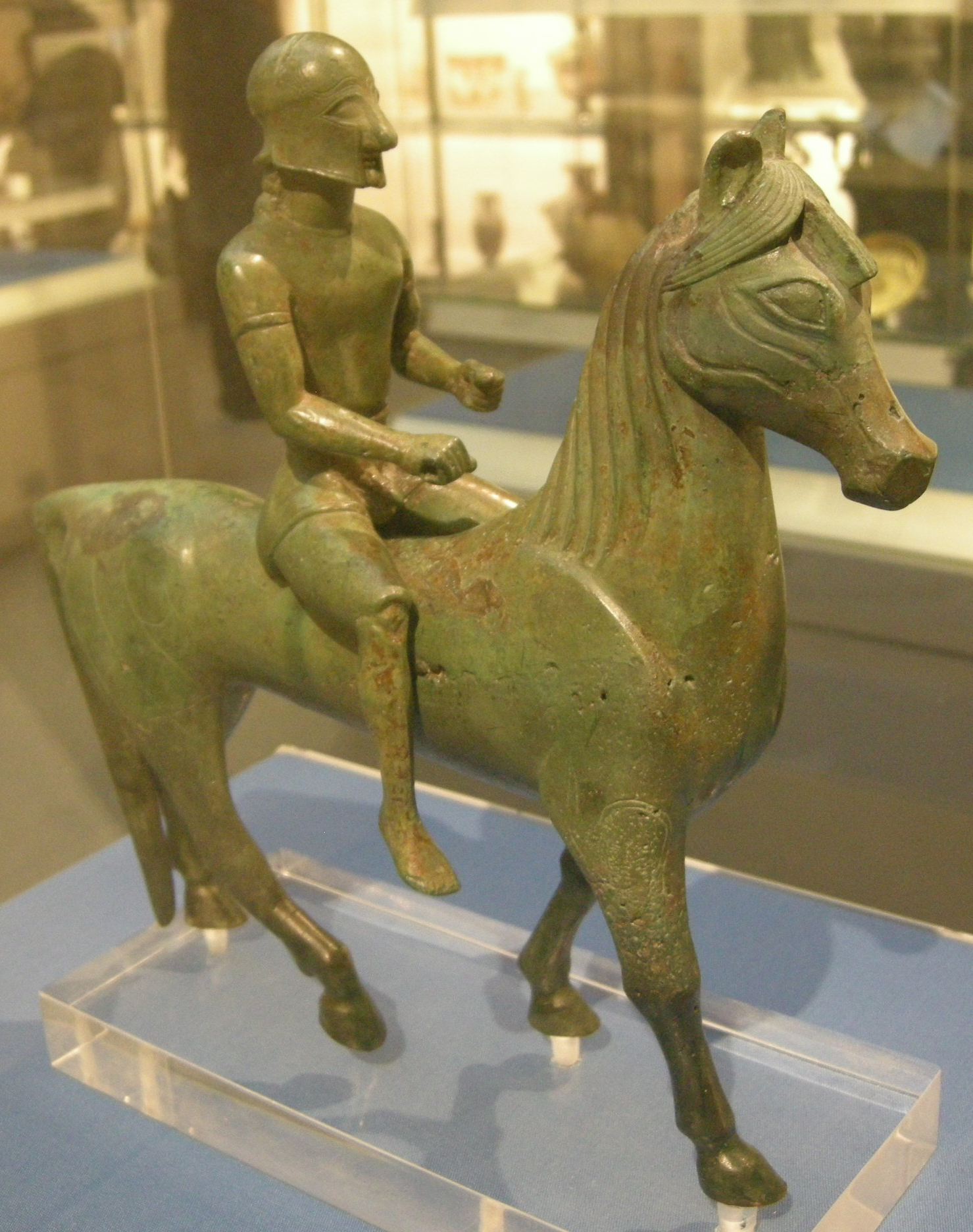
Armento Rider on display in the British Museum. Dating to 560-550 BC, it is one of the oldest bronze sculptures from Magna Graeca

The patron saint of the town is Saint Vitalis of Castronovo, who used to live as a hermit here in late 10th century. His relics were transferred to local cathedral.
