= Andrew Avellino =

16th-century Italian Theatine priest

Saint Andrew Avellino
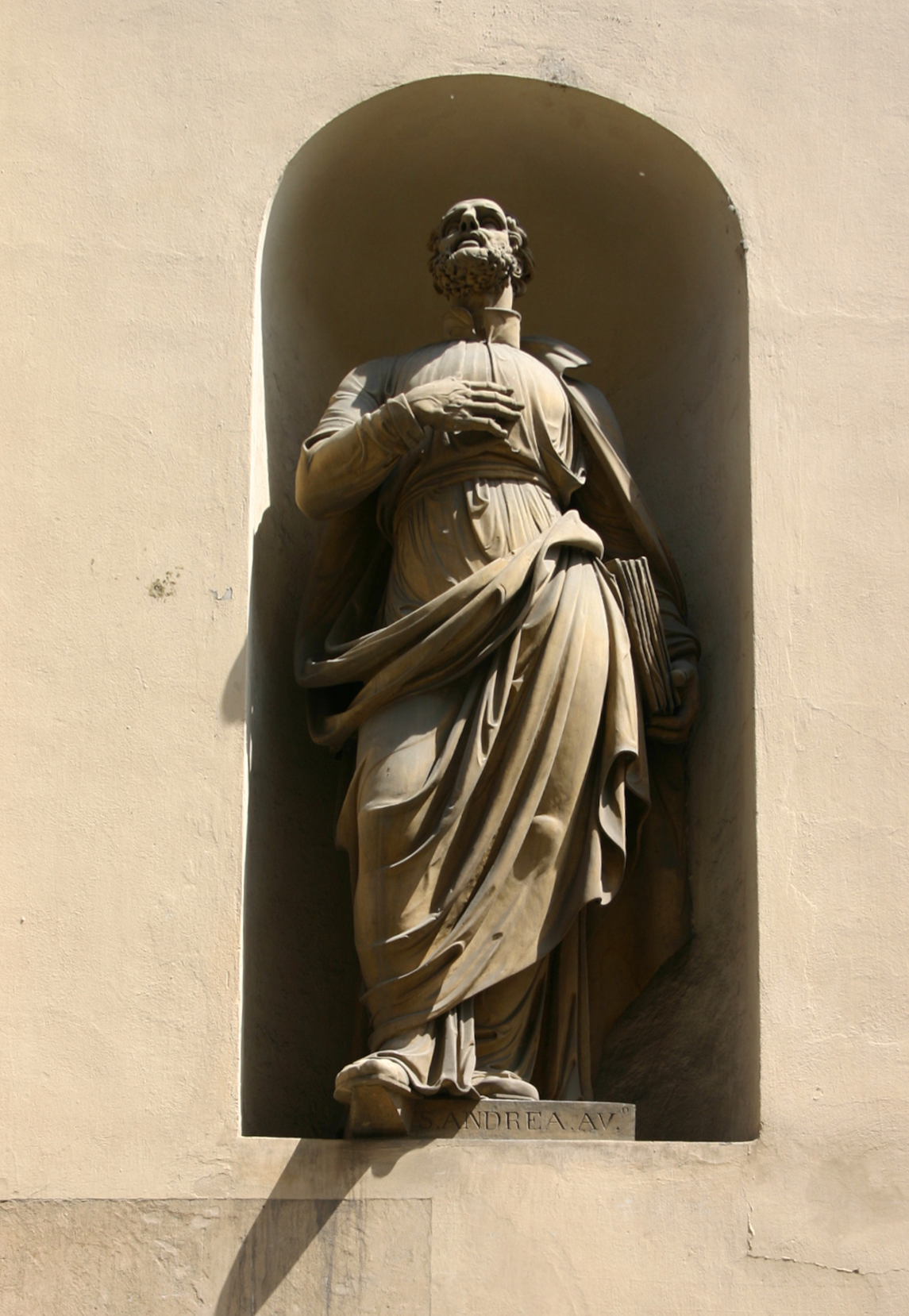
- Andrew Avellino Statue in Milan (Italy).

Confessor
- Born: 1521; Castronuovo, Basilicata
- Died: 10 November 1608 (aged 86–87)
- Beatified: 1624 by Urban VIII
- Canonized: 1712 by Clement XI
- Major shrine: Church of St. Paul, Naples
- Feast: 10 November
- Patronage: Naples, Sicily, Badolato; invoked against sudden death

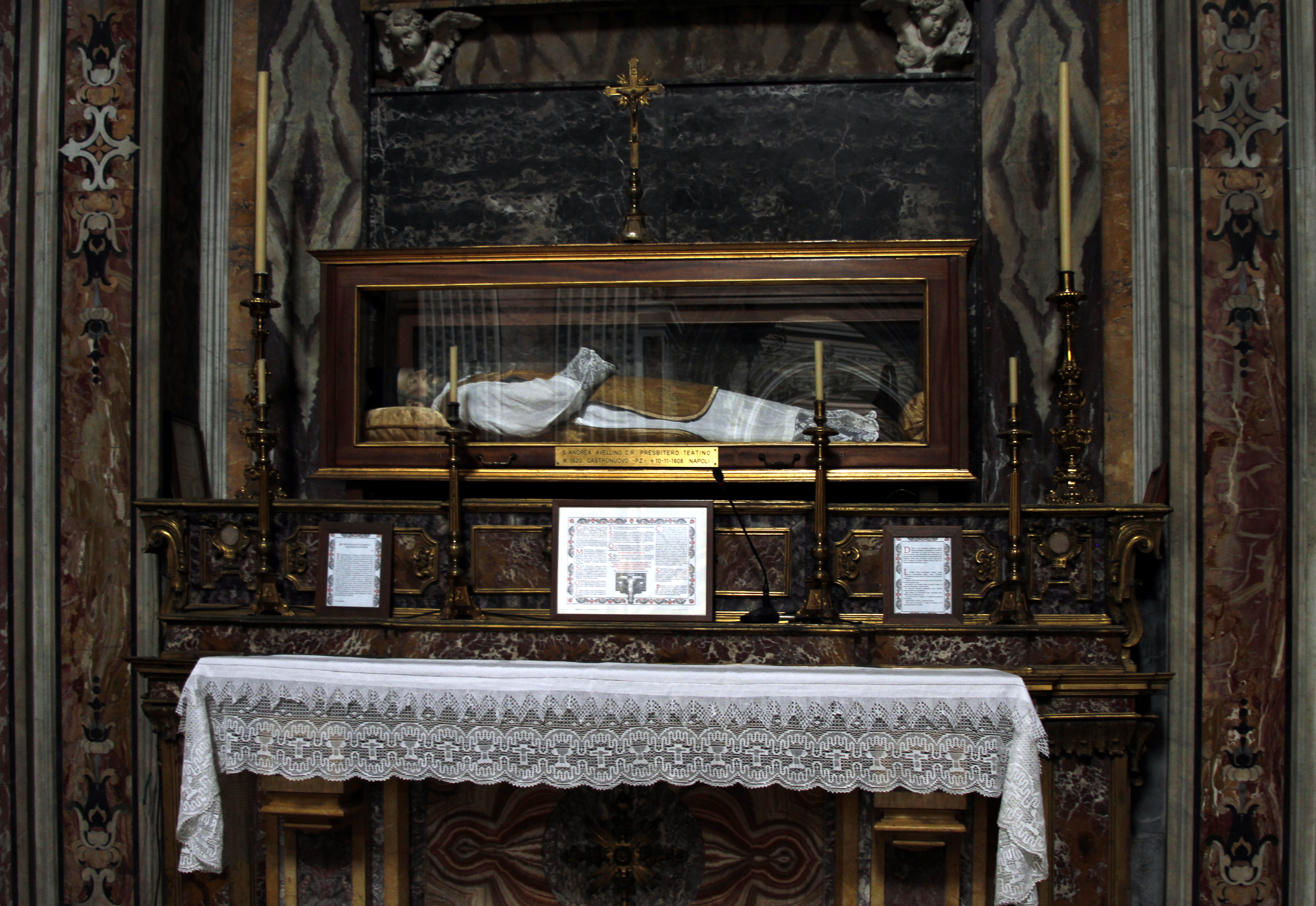
Body of Blessed Andrew Avellino in San Paolo Maggiore (Naples).

Andrew (Andrea) Avellino (1521 – 10 November 1608) was an Italian Theatine priest. He is venerated as the patron saint of Naples and Sicily and invoked especially against a sudden death. He led a life busy in preaching, hearing confessions, and visiting the sick, and writing.

== Life ==
Born at Castronuovo (today Castronuovo di Sant'Andrea), a small town in the province of Potenza, in Basilicata, his baptismal name was Lancelotto, which he changed to Andrew when he entered the Order of Theatines. After receiving his elementary training in the school at Castronuovo, he was sent to Venice to pursue a course in the humanities and in philosophy. Being a handsome youth, his chastity was often exposed to danger from female admirers, and to escape their importuning he took ecclesiastical tonsure.

He went to Naples to study canon and civil law, obtained the degree of Doctor of Laws and was ordained priest at the age of twenty-six. For some time he held the office of lawyer at the ecclesiastical court of Naples.

The archbishop of Naples now commissioned him to reform a convent at Naples, which by the laxity of its discipline had become a source of great scandal. By his own example and his untiring zeal, he restored the religious discipline of the convent but not without many and great difficulties. Certain wicked men who were accustomed to having clandestine meetings with the nuns became exasperated at the saint's interference, and one night he was assaulted and severely wounded. He was brought to the monastery of the Theatines to recuperate. Here, however, he resolved to devote himself entirely to God and he entered the Order of Theatines, which had only recently been founded by Gaetano dei Conti di Thiene. In 1556, on the vigil of the Assumption he was invested, being then thirty-five years of age, and took the name of Andrew.

After completing his novitiate, he obtained permission to visit the tombs of the Apostles and the Martyrs at Rome, and, upon his return, was made master of novices. After holding this office for ten years, he was elected superior. His zeal for strict religious discipline and for the purity of the clergy, as well as his deep humility and sincere piety, induced the General of his Order to entrust him with the foundation of two new Theatine houses, one at Milan and the other at Piacenza. By his efforts, many more Theatine houses rose up in various dioceses of Italy. As superior of some of these new foundations, he was so successful in converting sinners and heretics by his prudence in the direction of souls and by his eloquent preaching that numerous disciples thronged around him, eager to be under his spiritual guidance. One of the most noteworthy of his disciples was Lorenzo Scupoli, the author of The Spiritual Combat. Charles Borromeo was a close friend of Avellino and sought his advice in the most important affairs of the church. He also requested him to establish a new Theatine house in Milan.

Avellino collaborated with Paolo Burali d'Arezzo in implementing the reforms of the Council of Trent in the Diocese of Piacenza.

== Works ==
Though indefatigable in preaching, hearing confessions, and visiting the sick, Avellino still had time to write some ascetical works. His letters were published in 1731 at Naples in two volumes, and his other ascetical works were published three years later in five volumes.

== Death ==
On 10 November 1608, when beginning the Holy Sacrifice of the Mass, he was stricken with apoplexy, and, after receiving the Holy Viaticum, died at the age of 88. In 1624, only 16 years after his death, he was beatified by Pope Urban VIII, and in 1712 was canonized by Pope Clement XI.

== Veneration ==
He is venerated as patron saint of Naples and Sicily and invoked especially against a sudden death. He is also invoked for the protection of stroke victims. His remains lie buried in the Church of San Paolo Maggiore in Naples. His feast day is 10 November.

== See also ==
- Saint Andrew Avellino, patron saint archive
