= Armento Rider =

Ancient bronze sculpture

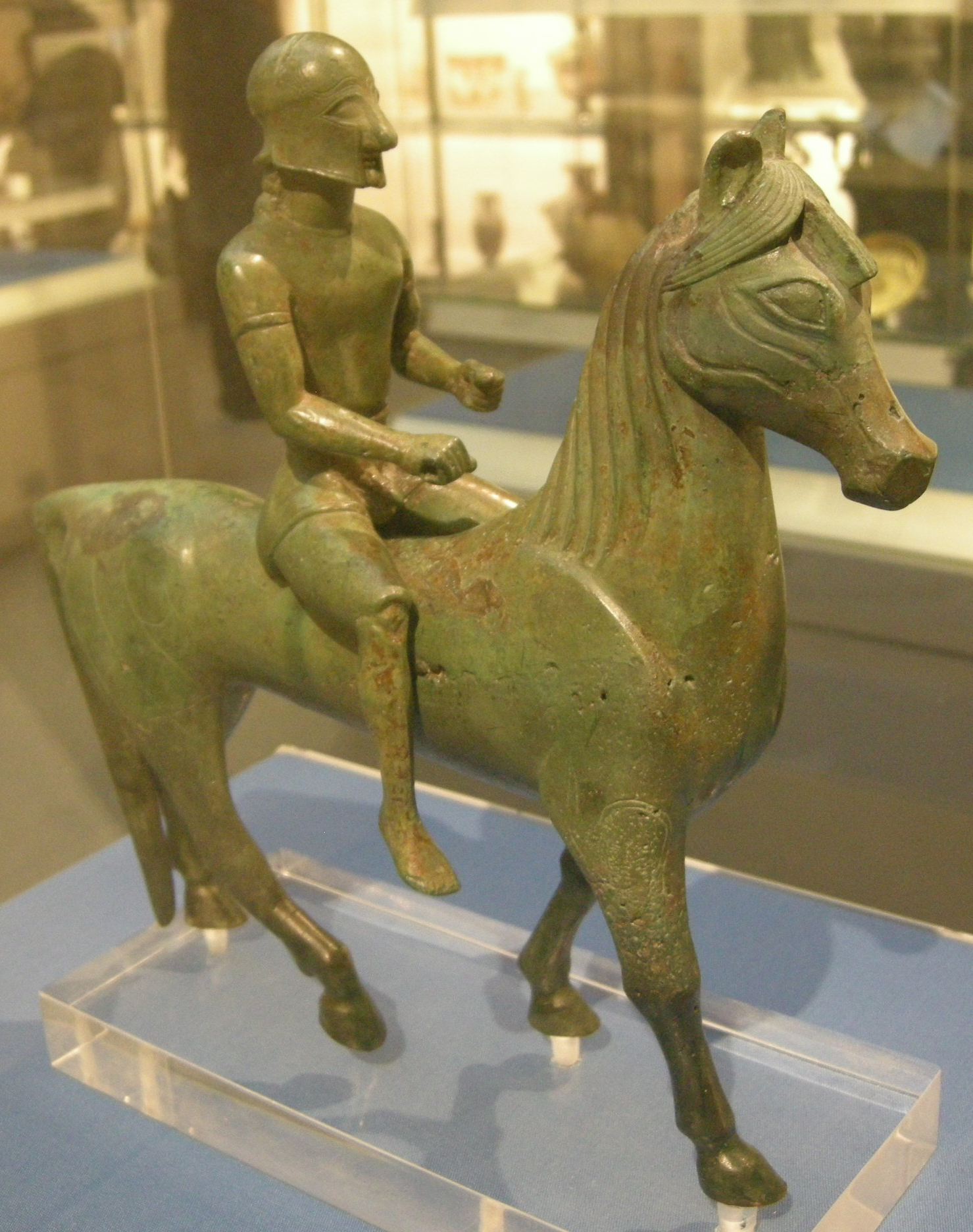
- Armento rider and horse on display in the British Museum
- Material: Bronze
- Size: 23.6 cm high
- Created: 560-550 BC
- Present location: British Museum, London
- Registration: GR 1904.7-3.1

The Armento Rider is an ancient bronze sculpture of a rider and a horse that was originally found in the town of Armento in southern Italy. Now part of the British Museum's collection, it is considered one of the oldest works of art from Western Greece or Magna Graecia.

== Description ==
The Armento Rider is a diminutive statue of a Greek warrior wearing a corinthian helmet who bestrides a horse with a long mane and elongated body. Solid cast in bronze in two separate pieces and made about 560-550 BC, it is one of the earliest bronzes to be produced in the ancient Greek world. The rider is shown beardless wearing a short belted chiton and once used to hold a spear and reins for the horse.

== Provenance ==
The bronze sculpture originally belonged to the Hungarian collector Gábor Fejérváry, who purchased it in Naples in 1833. After passing through several collections, it was eventually acquired by the British Museum in 1904. When first discovered the statue was wrongly attributed to the settlement of Grumentum, although recent research has shown that it originated from Armento, an ancient Greek site from the region of Basilicata, southern Italy.
