= San Michele Abbey, Monticchio =

Benedictine abbey in Monticchio, Basilicata

Coordinates: 40°56′07″N 15°36′59″E

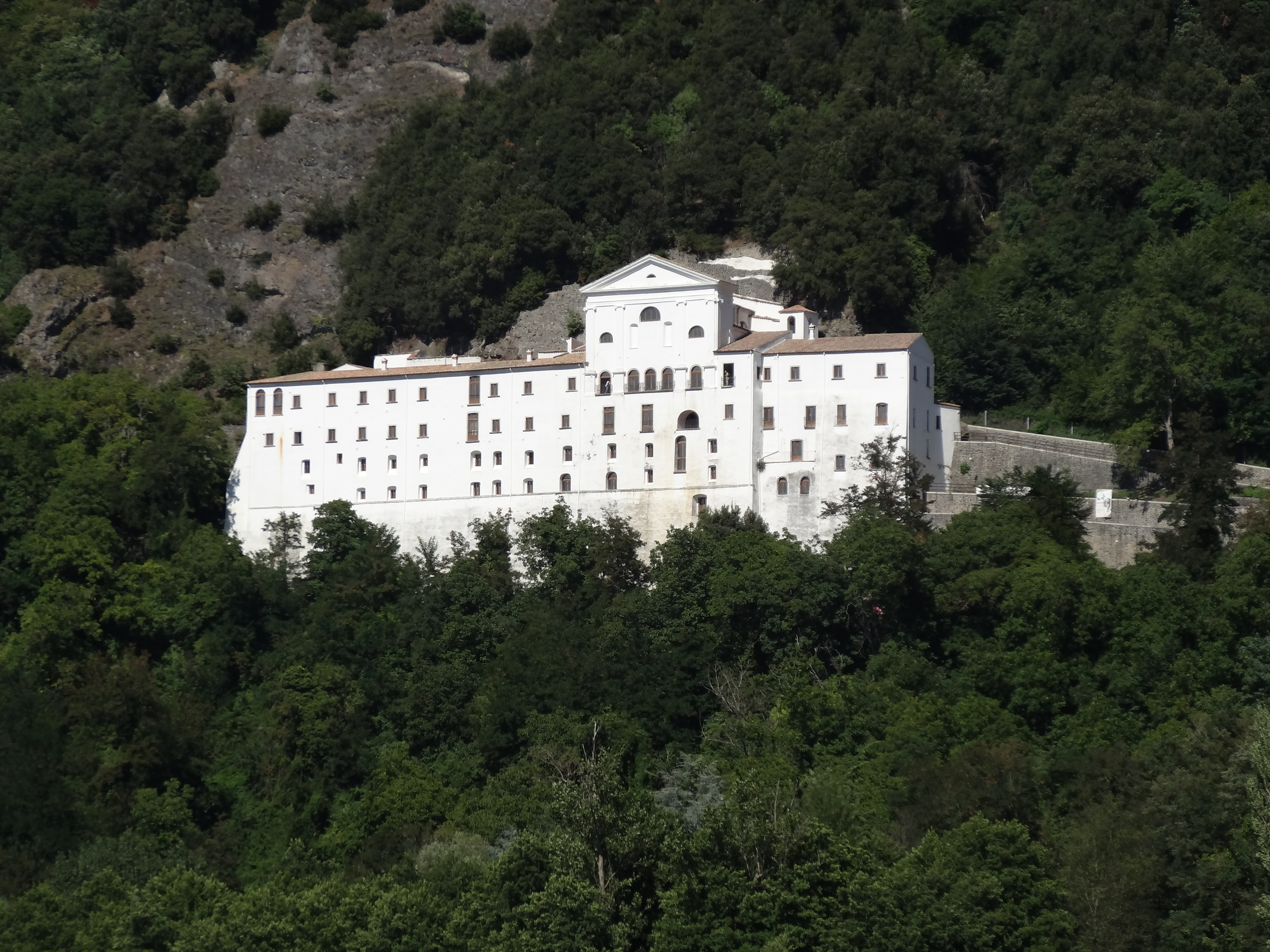
Abbey of San Michele

The Abbey of San Michele is a Benedictine Abbey located at the foot of Monte Vulture, on the eastern flank of the Lago di Monticchio Piccolo in Monticchio in the region of Basilicata, Italy.

== History ==
The abbey was founded in the 10th century at the site of grottoes carved into a rock cliff. There is evidence of worship at the site from the 3rd to 4th century of the modern era.

In 726, Leo III the Isaurian, Emperor of the East, issued a decree against the cult of sacred images. This decree encouraged the flight of many Greek monks to neighboring territories, many of whom came to repopulate cities deserted by civil wars, Saracen raids, earthquakes, famines, and plagues. In fact, the monks of the Basilian order spread throughout the Adriatic coast. The area of Monte Vulture was also reached by Basilian monks.

By the end of the 10th century, the abbot Saint Vitalis of Castronovo and his nephew and disciple Elia of Sicily arrived on Monte Vulture, coming from Calabria to near Rapolla, where he died in 994. In fact, the large cave on Monte Vulture, perched above the small lake, was inhabited by Greek Monks, their presence being confirmed by a small oratory behind the current altar of Saint Michael. That cave closely resembles the sanctuary of Saint Michael on the Gargano.

Veneration of St Michael Archangel was developed by the Italian-Greek monks at the site, who were then replaced by Benedictines, who erected the abbey, then abandoned it in 1456. it was occupied by the Capuchin friars. An 18th-century church was built at the site near the rock-cut chapel of San Michele.
