= Jeffrey Pullicino Orlando =

Maltese politician (born 1963)

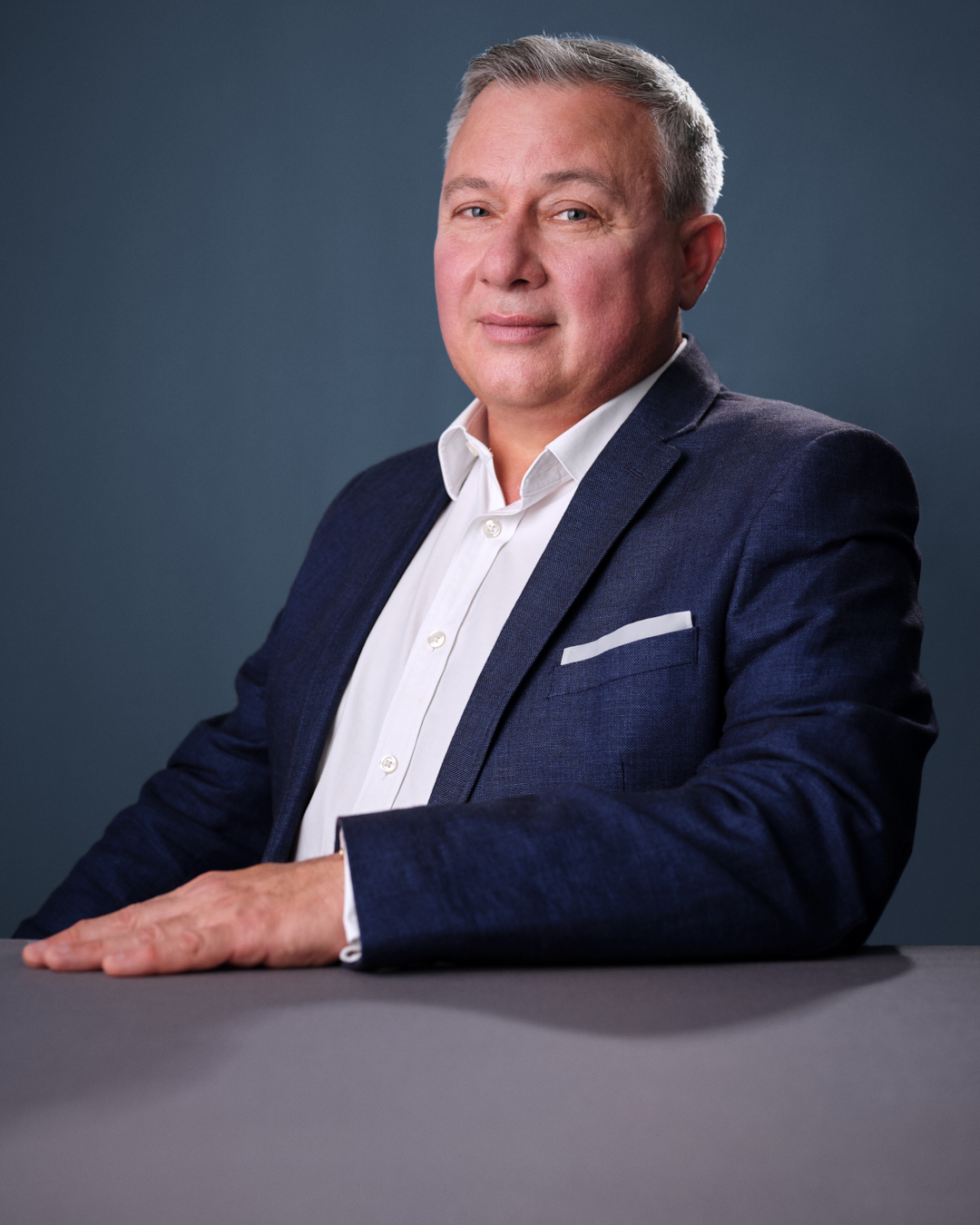

Member of Parliament
- In office 26 October 1996 – 10 March 2013

Personal details
- Born: 27 November 1963 (age 62) Sliema, Malta
- Party: Partit Nazzjonalista (1992-2012); Partit Laburista (2013-present)
- Spouses: Marlene Farrugia (divorced); Carmen Ciantar (divorced)
- Domestic partner: Lara Boffa
- Children: 3

Jeffrey Pullicino Orlando (born 27 November 1963) is a Maltese former Member of Parliament who served as the Executive Chairman of the Malta Council for Science and Technology for 13 years - till December 2022, and is currently the Executive Chairman of the National Skills Council.

== Early life ==
Orlando was educated at De La Salle College, Malta and the University of Malta. He graduated as a dental surgeon in 1987. He lives in Żebbuġ, Malta.

Orlando was very active, politically, as a student. He organised his first demonstration at the age of sixteen against the educational policies of the Socialist government at the time. He was elected to represent his fellow students on the Faculty Board of the Faculty of Dental Surgery (UOM). He was also very active in the Nationalist Party youth movement (MŻPN).

== Political life ==
He was the first councillor elected to represent the Nationalist Party on the Żebbuġ Local Council in 1992. He subsequently contested the 1996, 1998, 2003 and 2008 General Elections successfully. He was elected from two districts in the 2008 elections, being the first MP elected from one of them and the Nationalist Party MP to get the greatest number of votes from the other. His total number of first count votes was 5131. A controversy surrounding land he owned at Mistra became a major issue in the run-up to these elections. Joseph Muscat, the leader of the Labour Party and prime minister, has revealed that this was a mise en scène concocted by the Nationalist Party to discredit his predecessor, Alfred Sant. The ruse was instrumental in the PN victory in those elections.

He is reported to have been encouraged by 6 successive leaders of the two main political parties in Malta, PN (Nationalist Party) and PL (Labour Party), to contest on their ticket.

Pullicino Orlando accepted to contest the 2017 general elections with the Labour Party on the insistence of Prime Minister Joseph Muscat. Notwithstanding a very short 10 day campaign, he managed to get a good result but failed to get re-elected. His clinic in Zebbug was targeted by arsonists a few days after these elections in what was clearly a politically motivated attack. His candidature with the Labour Party had been met with fierce criticism from die-hard Nationalists.

He held the posts of Shadow Minister for Telecommunications, Head of Delegation of the Maltese Parliamentary Delegation to the Parliamentary Assembly of the Council of Europe, and was the Vice-President of the Assembly for 2 consecutive years. He resigned from the Nationalist Party on 20 July 2012, making him an Independent MP. He cited serious differences with high ranking Party officials as the reason for doing so. He did not contest the following elections in 2013.

== Malta Council for Science and Technology ==
He was appointed Chairman of the Council in March 2010 by Nationalist Prime Minister Lawrence Gonzi. His term was extended twice by the Labour administration led by Joseph Muscat. His reappointment as Executive Chairman was confirmed by the administration led by Prime Minister Robert Abela in 2020, immediately after he took over as prime minister. Under his stewardship, the MCST grew considerably. The number of employees increased from less than 10 in 2010 to over 150. Its remit expanded to include areas such as Space and PRIMA (Partnership for Research and Innovation in the Mediterranean Area) and there has been an exponential increase in international collaborative initiatives in Research and Innovation (R and I). He was instrumental in the setting up of the Council's research funding programme, 'Fusion', which is considered to be a mainstay of Malta's R and I ecosystem.

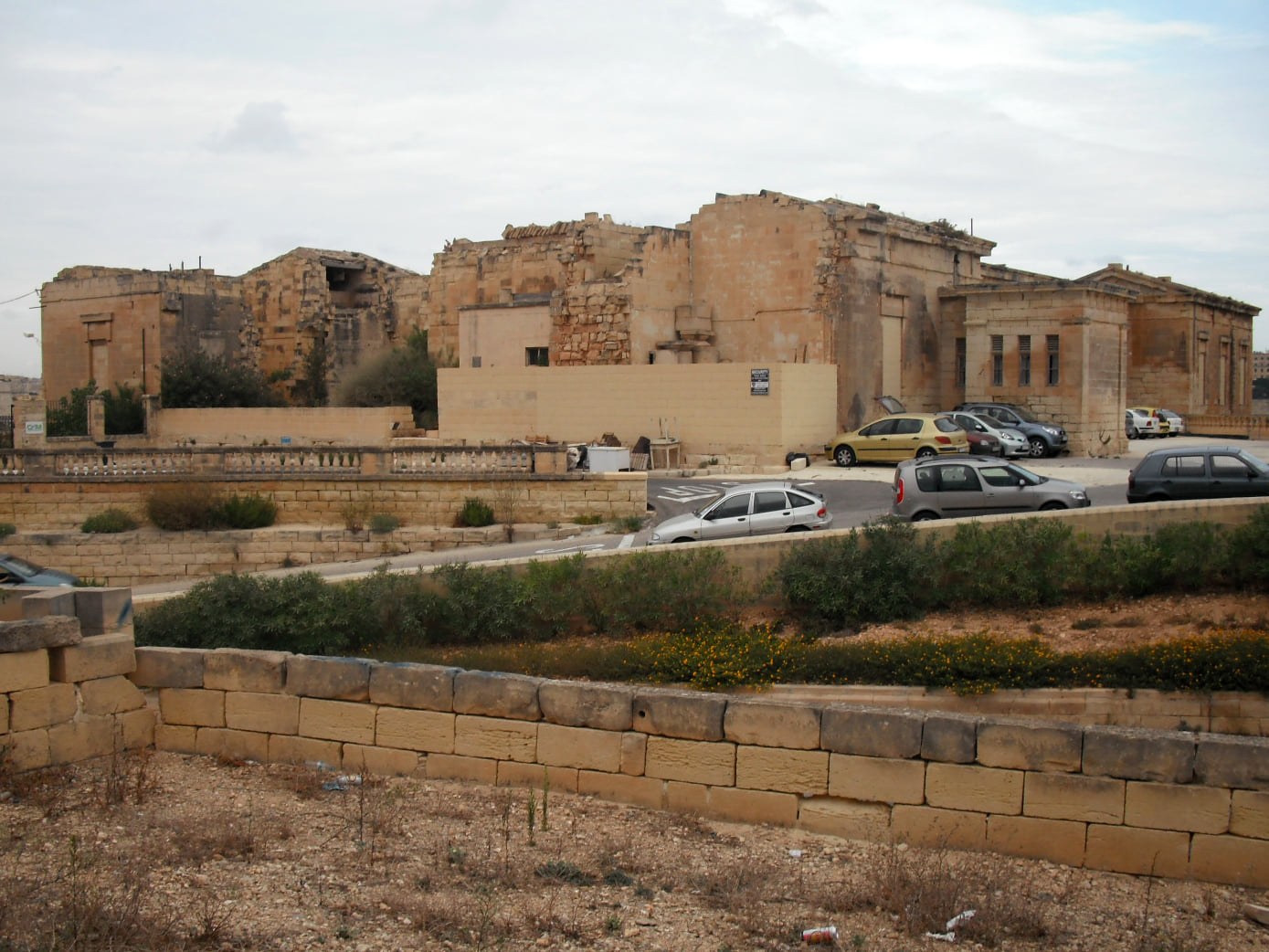
Esplora facade (before restoration)

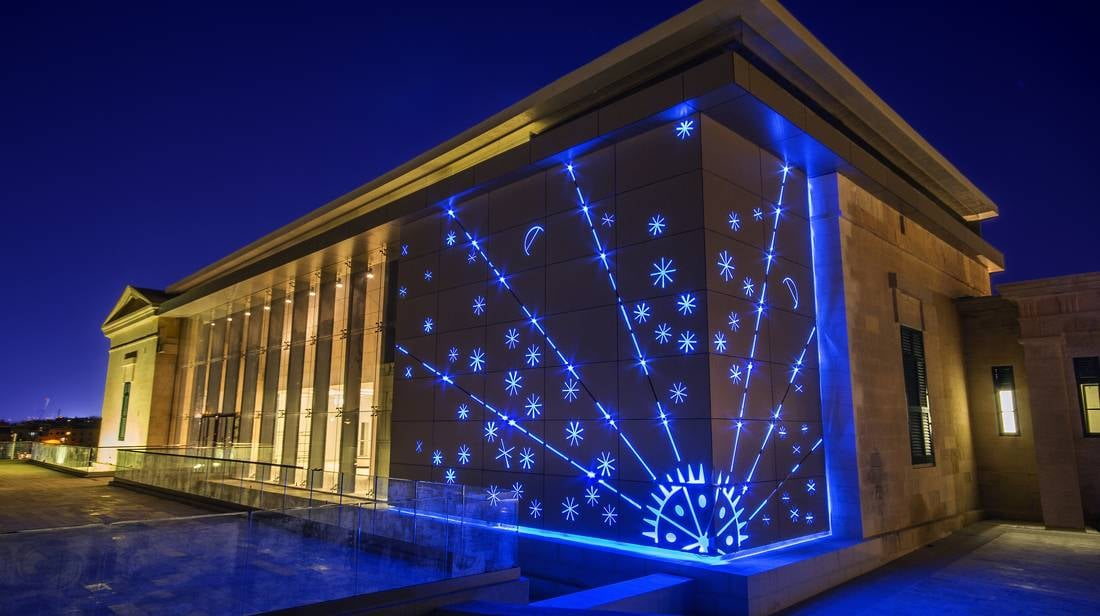
Esplora facade (after restoration)

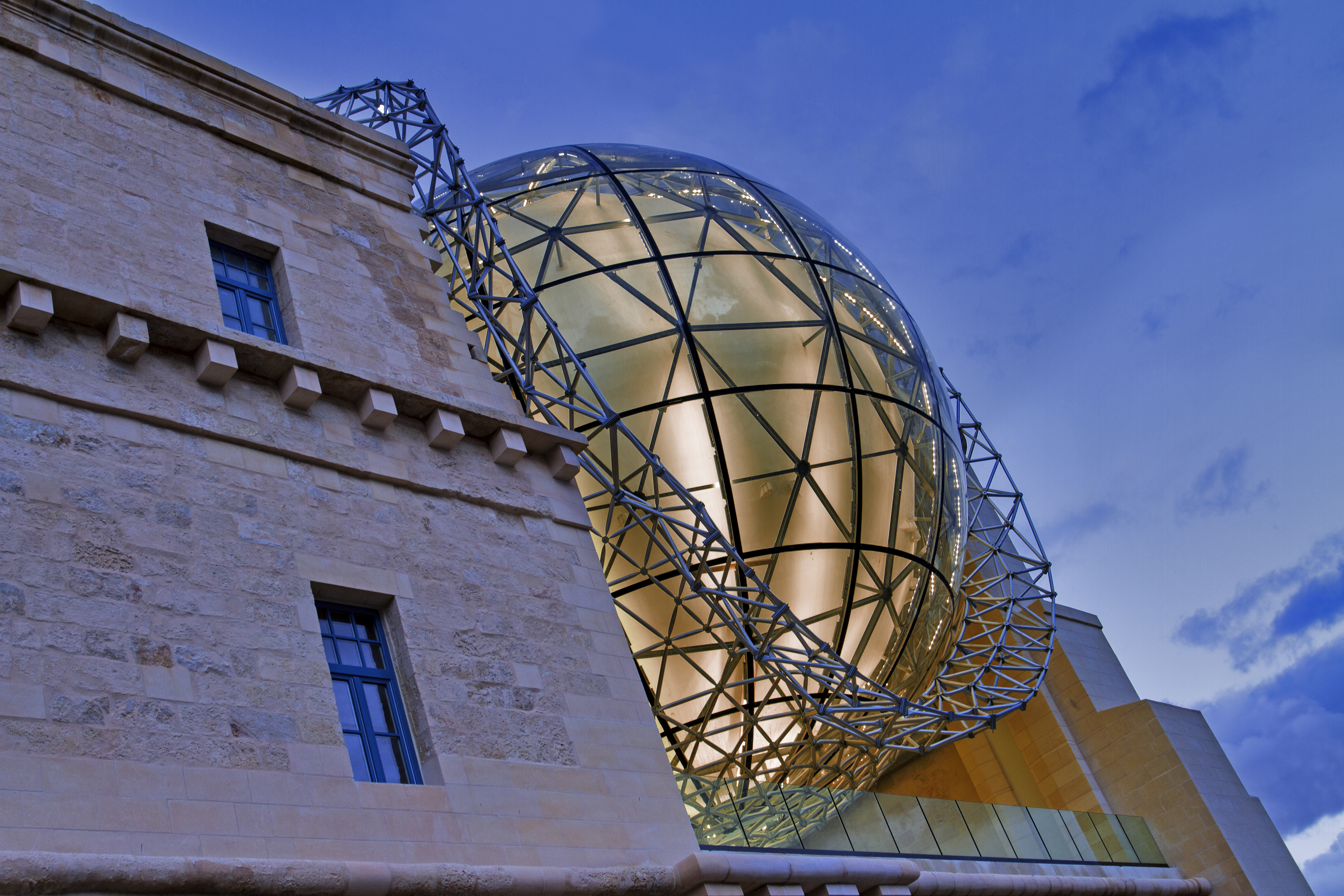
Esplora Planetarium

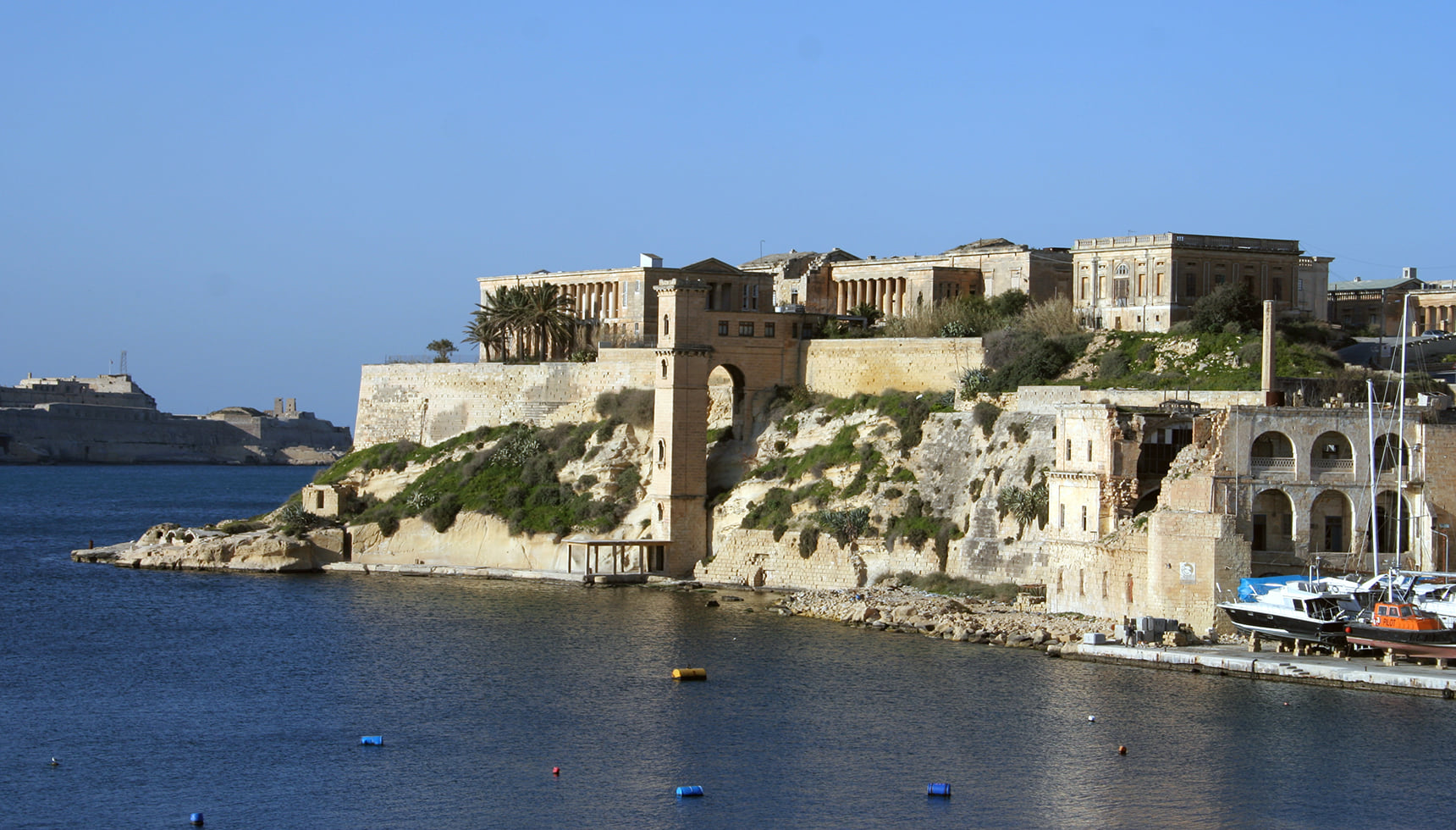
Esplora Foreshore (before restoration)

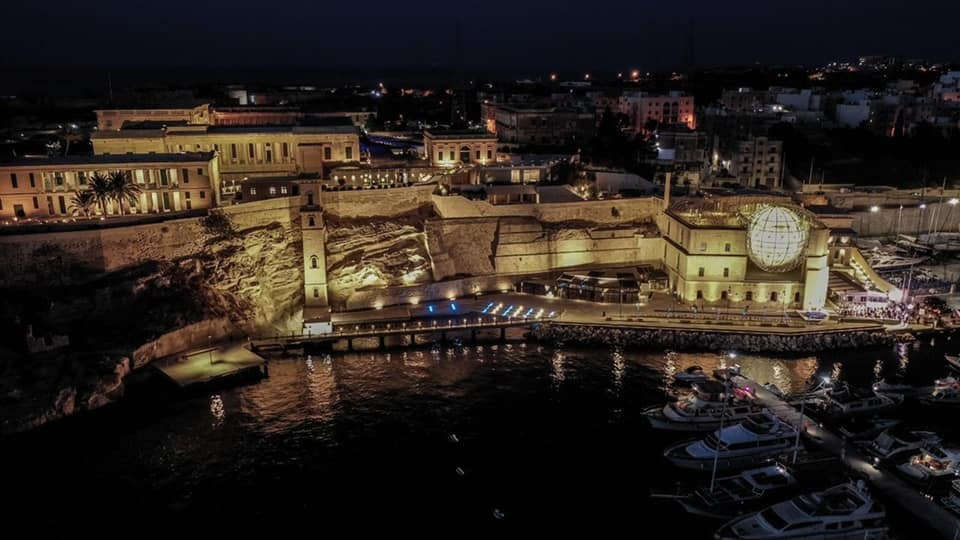
Esplora Foreshore (after restoration)

He oversaw the development of Malta's National Interactive Science Centre (Esplora), a state of the art facility which has become one of Malta's foremost visitor attractions. The development of Esplora involved the rehabilitation of the former Bighi Naval Hospital, which was in a state of imminent collapse, into a 22,000 square metre complex which includes a unique Planetarium and well over 200 interactive exhibits. This complicated project, which was partly financed by EU Structural Funding, was completed in two and a half years. Esplora was inaugurated by Prime Minister Joseph Muscat on 28 October 2016. The centre was selected by the European Commission as one of the Emblematic Projects for the 30th Anniversary of the Cohesion Policy in April 2018. It was recognised as one of the top 10% of attractions globally on TripAdvisor.

An MCST audit carried out by the National Audit Office in 2022, his last full year at the helm, resulted in the Council being commended for 'good practice' and cited by the Governance Action Directorate of the Office of the Prime Minister as a role model for other governmental entities.

== National Skills Council ==
Pullicino Orlando was appointed Executive Chairman of the National Skills Council in January 2023. He set it up from scratch, with the full support of his team and central government, to ensure that the Council hit the ground running in what was chosen to be the European Year of Skills. The Council was officially launched on the first of March 2023 by the Minister for Education, Dr Clifton Grima. The Council, which is based in Pembroke, will be focusing on the promotion of specific skills, upskilling and reskilling, to ensure that Malta’s workforce is prepared to make the most out of the employment opportunities arising from a fast-developing economy. Transversal skills will be given particular importance. The Council is working closely with all the relevant constituted bodies representing the private sector, workers' representatives, and government entities to achieve its aims.

Pullicino Orlando was appointed member of the Board of Governors of the Malta College for Arts, Science and Technology (MCAST) in January 2024. The National Skills Council and MCAST work very closely on a number of skills related initiatives.

== kENUP Foundation ==
Pullicino Orlando is also one of the founders and a director of the kENUP Foundation, a non-profit public benefit foundation which supports research based innovation in the health sector. kENUP's ultimate aim is to ensure that effective and affordable therapeutical agents, ranging from vaccines to pharmaceuticals, are readily available on a global level. The Foundation is based in Malta, and has the full support of the European Commission through the European Fund for Strategic Investment (EFSI).

As kENUP Director, Pullicino Orlando was the driving force behind an initiative which saw the Foundation’s offices converted into a residence for 30 Ukrainian refugees in April 2022. Mothers fleeing their war-torn country with their children were provided with all the support necessary in their home away from home, with the help of numerous sponsors, volunteers and MCST employees.

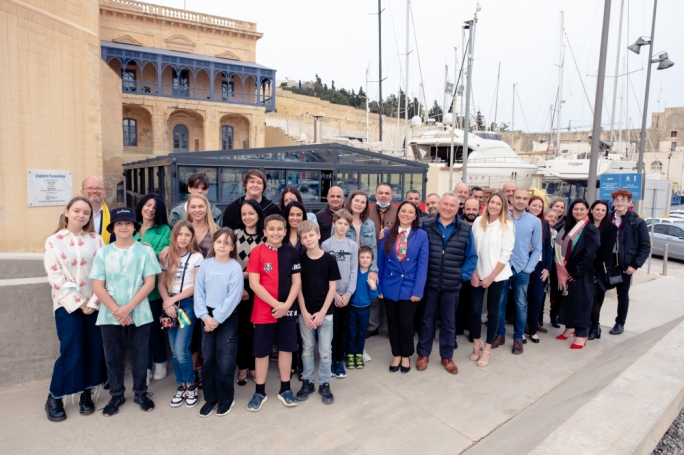
Ukrainian Families Adoption initiative

Pullicino Orlando was appointed Guardian of kENUP Africa in February 2024. Acknowledging the need for pharmaceutical equity for the Global South, the kENUP Foundation has established kENUP Africa in Kigali, Rwanda. The new Common Benefit Foundation will be pursuing activities not only in Africa but also working on South/South collaborations between Africa, Latin America and the Caribbean, and exploring related synergies with the European Union.

== Malta's High Commissioner to Rwanda ==
Pullicino Orlando's nomination to this post by the Foreign Affairs Minister was unanimously approved by the Public Appointments Committee on the 14th of April 2025. He serves as a non-resident High Commissioner. His extensive high-level dealings with the government of the Republic of Rwanda and with several international institutions throughout his career were cited as being the reason for this nomination. His experience in the Commonwealth Parliamentary Association and the Council of Europe – together with his more recent dealings with the OECD – were deemed as being particularly relevant during the hearing which led to bipartisan support for his appointment.

== Notable campaigns ==
Pullicino Orlando has been involved in a number of notable campaigns. He successfully campaigned against the establishment of a cement plant in the central part of the island which could have had a detrimental impact on his constituents' health, a waste landfill next to the prehistoric temples of Mnajdra and an underground museum which could have potentially damaged St John's Co-Cathedral in Valletta. He had the wide support of civil society on these issues. These campaigns often brought him at odds with big business concerns. His efforts in the environmental field were given formal recognition when he was awarded the title of 'Green Politician of the Year' in 2002 by Nature Trust (Malta).

He militated against abortion in the Parliamentary Assembly of the Council of Europe.[1] He campaigned for the introduction of divorce in Malta in 2011 (2011 Maltese divorce referendum). He set up what was probably the only political movement in Maltese history to include individuals hailing from all parts of the political spectrum - Moviment IVA ghad-Divorzju, IVA ghaz-zwieg (The pro-divorce movement). This movement successfully campaigned against the joint might of the Nationalist Party in Government and the Church.

He also campaigned for gay rights and was instrumental in the introduction of legislation regulating In Vitro Fertilisation in Malta. Militating in favour of such controversial issues in predominantly Catholic Malta has made him the target of conservative journalists and columnists. Threats to his family have also been reported.

He set up the Anti-Cyberharassment Alliance in August 2013, together with a number of prominent individuals such as the former Chairperson of the pro-divorce movement, former Parliamentary Secretary Deborah Schembri, and former minister Jesmond Mugliett. The Alliance successfully put the issues of Cyberharassment and Cyberbullying on the national agenda.

== Autobiography ==
Pullicino Orlando's autobiography, With All Due Respect, was published in June 2021. It received widespread critical acclaim, being described as 'eminently well-written', 'hard to put down' and 'refreshingly honest' by leading journalists. It is considered to give a valuable perspective of the events that shaped recent Maltese history, given that – quite uniquely - the author has been directly involved with both major parties at the highest of levels.
