= Monte Stella (Calabria) =

Mountain in Italy

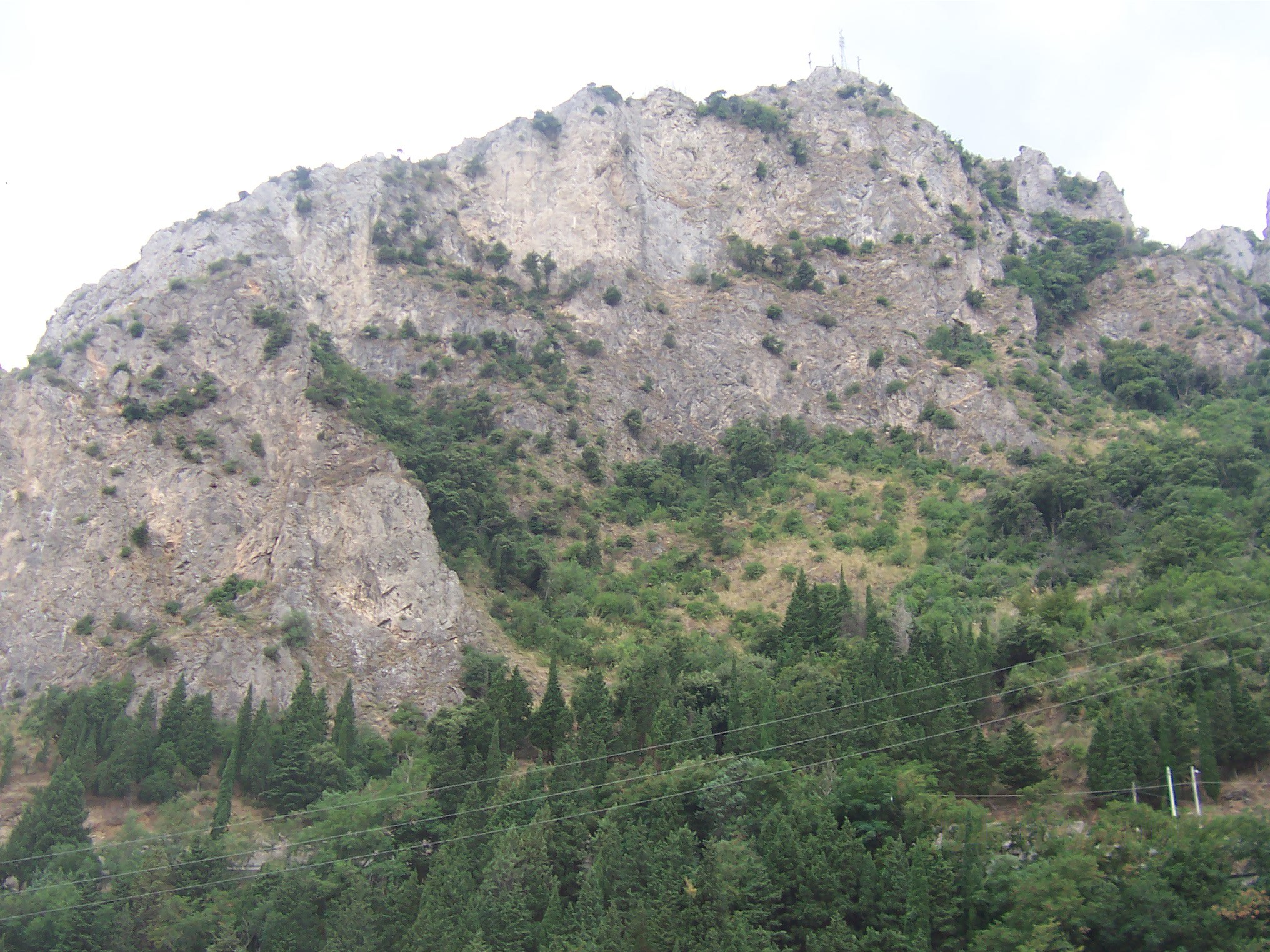
- Monte Stella, seen from the territory of Pazzano.

Highest point
- Elevation: 832 m (2,730 ft)
- Coordinates: 38°16′53″N 16°15′51″E

Geography
- Location within Italy
- Location: Calabria, Italy
- Parent range: Serre Calabresi

Monte Stella is a mountain in the Serre Calabresi, in the Locride, Calabria, southern Italy. It is part of the Vallata dello Stilaro, in the comune of Pazzano.

Monte Stella is composed of Jurassic limestones.

== History ==
At the base of the limestone rocks, at their conjunction with a Paleozoic bed, are limonite (iron mineral) rocks whose exploitation started from around 1000 CE. The mines continued to work until the late 19th century.

Until the 17th century the mountain was home to a hermitage of Orthodox monks, later replaced by Basilian monks. In the cave of the sanctuary is a statue in Sicilian style, sculpted in 1562.

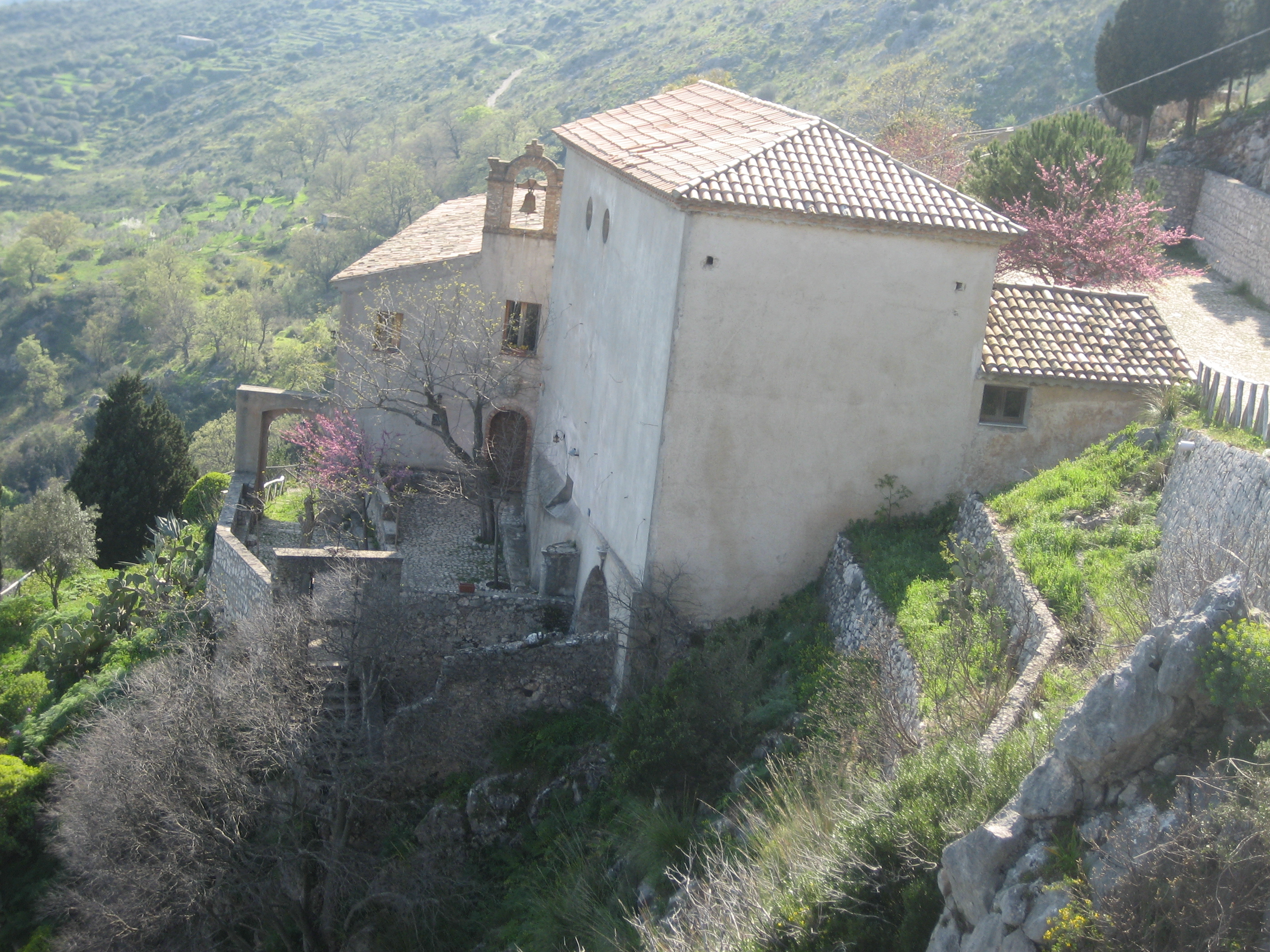
Hermitage of Santa Maria della Stella.

== See also ==
- Hermit of Santa Maria della Stella

== Sources ==
- Blanchard, Paul (2007). Southern Italy. London: Somerset Books. ISBN 978-1-905131-18-1.
