= Żebbuġ =

Żebbuġ Ħaż-Żebbuġ Città Rohan Casal Zebbugi
- City and Local council
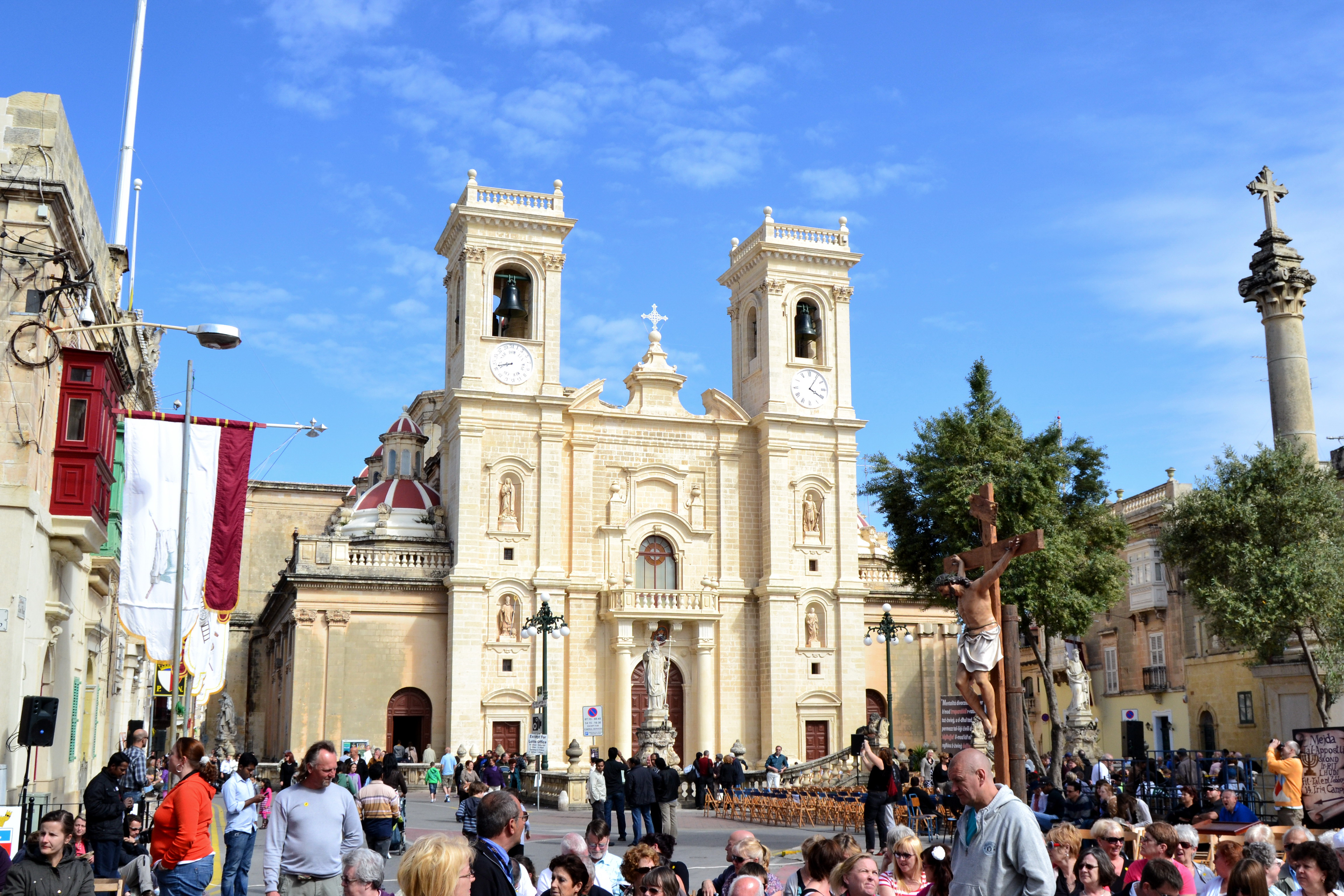
- Church of St Philip of Agira

- Flag Coat of arms
- Etymology: Ħal ("village") + żebbuġ ("olives")
- Nickname: Citta Rohan
- Motto: Semper Virens
- The area occupied by "Ħaż-Żebbuġ"
- Coordinates: 35°52′23″N 14°26′31″E
- Country: Malta
- Region: Western Region
- District: Western District
- Borders: Attard, Siġġiewi Mdina, Qormi, Rabat, Siġġiewi

Government
  - Mayor: Steve Zammit Lupi (Independent)

Area
  - Total: 8.7 km^{2} (3.4 sq mi)

Population (Jul 2024)
  - Total: 14,798
  - Density: 1,700/km^{2} (4,400/sq mi)
- Demonyms: Żebbuġi (m), Żebbuġija (f), Żebbuġin (pl)
- Time zone: UTC+1 (CET)
  - Summer (DST): UTC+2 (CEST)
- Postal code: ZBG
- Dialing code: +356
- ISO 3166 code: MT-66
- Patron saint: St. Philip of Agira
- Day of festa: 12 May (Liturgical feast); 2nd Sunday of June (Parish feast)
- Website: Official website

Żebbuġ (Maltese: Ħaż-Żebbuġ [ħɐzːɛˈbːuːt͡ʃ]), also known by its title Città Rohan, is a city in the Western Region of Malta. It is one of the oldest towns in the country. The population of Żebbuġ was 14,798 in July 2024, comprising 7,772 males and 7,026 females (of which 12,708 were Maltese nationals and 2,090 foreign nationals).

== History and origins ==
The parish church is dedicated to Philip of Agira and the feast is celebrated on the 2nd Sunday of June, although the actual feast day falls on the 12th day of May. The name of the town literally means "olives" in Maltese; it derives from the large olive groves that stood in and around the current location of the church and the centre of the town. The town was bestowed with the title of Città Rohan by Emmanuel de Rohan-Polduc, the Grand Master of the Order of St. John on 21 June 1777. As was the custom in such events, the people of Ħaż-Żebbuġ built an archway known as the De Rohan Arch at the entrance to their hometown by way of marking the incipiency of its status as a city. The gateway, also known by the locals as il-Bieb il-Ġdid (Maltese for "the New Gateway"), still stands today. The town's coat-of-arms is also based on that of the House of Rohan.

In 1380 a church dedicated to St. Philip of Agira was built in Casal Zebugi, a tract of land situated in the middle of the small communities which had developed during the previous Arab occupation of Malta, namely Ħal-Dwin, Ħal-Muxi and Ħal-Mula and which were eventually joined together forming the village known till today as Ħaż-Żebbuġ. Filippo de Catania "il-Kataniż" (Philip of Catania), a wealthy entrepreneur owning land in Ħaż-Żebbuġ, funded part of the construction of St. Philip Church built on his own land. Long years after it became the parish church another one, designed by Tumas Dingli, was erected in its stead in the late seventeenth century. The church has a titular painting by Luca Garnier and two murals by the 18th-century Maltese painter of the Favray school, Francesco Zahra, which critics consider to be his best works. Among other treasures the Church possesses an artefact attributed to Guido Reni and several others by Antonio Sciortino. The statue of St. Philip, by sculptor Luigi Fontana, was created in 1864.

When Malta was an independent principality under the sovereign Order of St. John, Ħaż-Żebbuġ was among the chief towns after Valletta and Mdina, first because of the presence of leading corsairs among its inhabitants, subsequently due to its major role in the cotton industry. The locals, or Żebbuġin as they are known in Malta, are renowned for their business acumen amongst others, and there is a local saying to this end.

Due to the Żebbuġin's Francophile past, the town was regarded as a friendly community when the Revolutionary French took Malta. During their rule in Malta (1798-1800), the local churches were plundered for their riches in order to fund Napoleon's campaign. The Ħaż-Żebbuġ locals opened the main door to the church when they heard the French were coming and hastily hid the gold and silver religious iconography. When the French saw the open doors of the church they kept on going and the Żebbuġin retained their religious riches.

== Archaeology ==
Malta is very rich in archaeological remains, and Ħaż-Żebbuġ is no exception. It gave its name to an era of prehistoric time when pottery of a kind not known as yet was found in tombs in the area known as Ta' Trapna. Later archaeological finds constructed at around the same time were subsequently known as "Żebbuġ phase" remains. A scattering of Punic and Phoenician tombs were also found together with a small number of cart ruts and other remains. The remains of Palaeoloxodon falconeri, an extinct species of Dwarf elephant that existed in Malta and Sicily, were first discovered near Żebbuġ in 1859.

== Today ==
Ħaż-Żebbuġ is known for the festas (feast days) dedicated to the patron saint Saint Philip of Agira; which is celebrated on the 2nd Sunday of June; and to Saint Joseph, a secondary feast. There are three band clubs in Ħaż-Żebbuġ, all of which have respective fireworks factories: De Rohan Band Club (established in 1860), St. Philip's Band Club (established in 1851) and the 12th May Band and Social Club (established in 1961).

Ħaż-Żebbuġ is the birthplace of various prominent Maltese personalities who have adorned the national cultural history down the ages, such as Mikiel Anton Vassalli (father of the written Maltese language), Dun Mikiel Xerri (patriot), Francesco Saverio Caruana (Bishop and Pariot during the French period, Nicolo Isouard (composer), Dun Karm Psaila (Malta's national poet), Antonio Sciortino (sculptor), Lazzaro Pisani (painter) and Frans Sammut (contemporary author).

Ħaż-Żebbuġ is the locality where the French Ambassador to Malta lives in what was previously the Palazzo Manduca. The Grand Chancery of the Hospitaller Order of Saint Lazarus of Jerusalem is also situated in the city.

== International relations ==
The Zebbug Local Council, which represents the Zebbug residents, joined the European Forum for Urban Security and, in 2011, was elected to the EFUS Executive Committee.

=== Twin towns – Sister cities ===
Żebbuġ is twinned with:

- Agira, Sicily, Italy

The city also has a cooperation agreement with:

- Enna, Sicily, Italy
- Acireale, Italy

== Sport and recreation ==
Żebbuġ Rangers F.C. is the town's association football club.

There are also a number of bands and social clubs in the area.

== Notable people ==
- Francesco Saverio Caruana, Roman Catholic bishop and rebel leader
- Godfrey Farrugia, politician, family doctor and former Minister of Health
- Jeffrey Pullicino Orlando, politician, civil rights campaigner and Executive Chairman of the National Skills Council
- Lazzaro Pisani, painter
- Dun Karm Psaila, Roman Catholic priest, poet and "Bard of Malta"
- Frans Sammut, author
- Antonio Sciortino, sculptor
- Mikiel Anton Vassalli, linguist, patriot, philosopher and "Father of the Maltese Language"
- Dun Mikiel Xerri, Roman Catholic priest, philosopher and patriot
