= 2011 Maltese divorce referendum =

- 28 May 2011
- Do you agree with the introduction of the option of divorce in the case of a married couple who has been separated or has been living apart for at least four years, and where there is no reasonable hope for reconciliation between the spouses, whilst adequate maintenance is guaranteed and the children are protected?

Results
Choice	Votes	%
Yes	122,547	53.16%
No	107,971	46.84%
Valid votes	230,518	99.07%
Invalid or blank votes	2,173	0.93%
Total votes	232,691	100.00%
Registered voters/turnout	325,102	71.57%
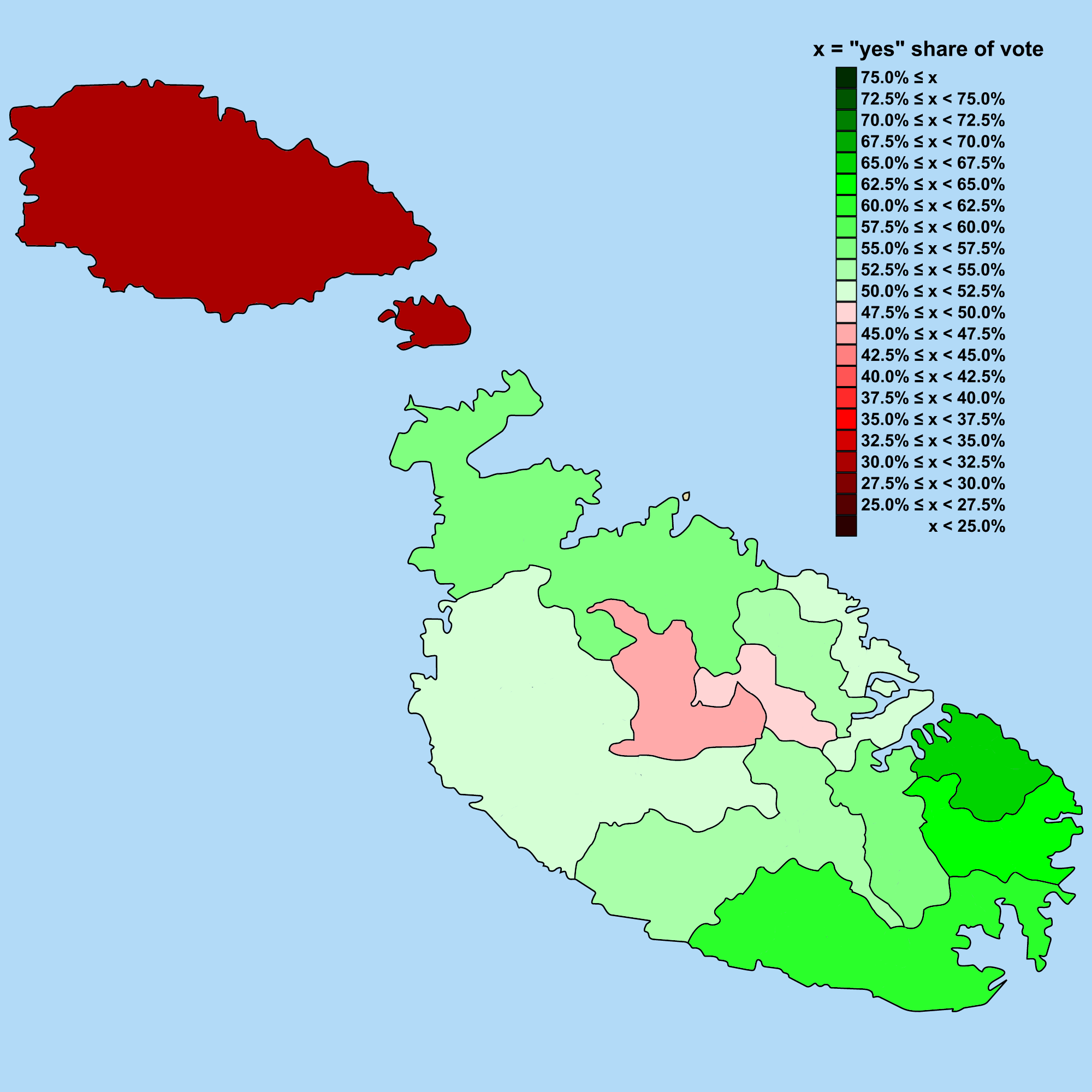
- Results by district
- Note: Saturation of colour denotes strength of vote

A referendum on divorce was held in Malta on 28 May 2011. Voters were asked whether they approved of a new law to introduce allowing divorces, as at that time, Malta was one of only three countries in the world (along with the Philippines and the Vatican City) in which divorce was not permitted. The proposal was approved by 53% of voters, resulting in a law allowing divorce under certain conditions being enacted later in the year.

== Background ==
A private member's bill was tabled in the House of Representatives by Jeffrey Pullicino Orlando, then a Nationalist Member of Parliament and Evarist Bartolo, then a Labour Member of Parliament. The text of the bill, which had been changed twice, did not provide for the holding of a referendum. This was eventually provided for through a separate Parliamentary resolution under the Referenda Act authorising a facultative, non-binding referendum to be held.

The Catholic Church in Malta encouraged a "no" vote through a pastoral letter issued on the Sunday before the referendum day. Complaints were made that religious pressure was being brought to bear upon voters. Around 8 per cent of marriages in Malta are already annulled by the Catholic Church.

== Question ==
Ballot papers had both English and Maltese questions printed on them. The English version of the question put to voters was as follows:

Do you agree with the introduction of the option of divorce in the case of a married couple who has been separated or has been living apart for at least four (4) years, and where there is no reasonable hope for reconciliation between the spouses, whilst adequate maintenance is guaranteed and the children are protected?

The question, which resembled the proposal approved by Irish voters in the Irish divorce referendum of 1995, was somewhat controversial. It was claimed that it did not reflect the content of the private member's bill.

== Results ==
Choice	Votes	%
For	122,547	53.16
Against	107,971	46.84
Total	230,518	100.00
Valid votes	230,518	99.07
Invalid/blank votes	2,173	0.93
Total votes	232,691	100.00
Registered voters/turnout	325,102	71.57
Source: Department of Information

Although for the purposes of the referendum the whole country was regarded to be a single constituency — taking into account electoral districts — in only three out of the thirteen did the "no" vote reach a majority.

== Aftermath ==
Discussion on the divorce bill started in earnest soon after the result was announced. In the second and third readings a number of MPs still voted against the bill. Parliament approved the law on 25 July. The law came into effect on 1 October.

== See also ==
- Divorce in Malta
