= Dun Mikiel Xerri =

18th-century Maltese priest

The Reverend Mikiel Xerri
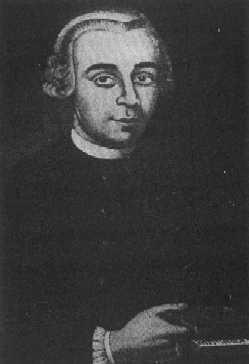
- Church: Roman Catholic

Personal details
- Born: September 29, 1737 Żebbuġ, Malta
- Died: January 17, 1799 (aged 61) Valletta, Malta
- Occupation: Priest and political activist

Dun Mikiel Xerri (Żebbuġ, Hospitaller Malta, 29 September 1737 – 17 January 1799) was a Maltese patriot. He was baptised Mikael Archangelus Joseph in the parish church of Żebbuġ on 30 September 1737, the son of Bartholomew Xerri and his wife Anne. Xerri studied at different universities in Europe. He lived under the Knights of St. John during their time in Malta, as well as the French when they took over the Maltese archipelago. He participated in an unsuccessful revolt to overthrow French rule under Napoleon Bonaparte; he, together with other locals, was executed on 17 January 1799 at the age of 61.

== Historical background and execution ==
In June 1798, French forces led by Napoleon Bonaparte took over the islands from the increasingly oppressive rule of the Knights of Malta. Initially, the populace accepted the change, believing in the possibility of having better government. However, in successive months, the French forces removed the rights of the Maltese nobility, and decided to stand against the Maltese church. Outraged by the plundering of their churches and faced by an unprecedented financial crisis that had been precipitated by the draining of most of the cash, on September 2, 1798, they rose against the French garrison in Notabile (Città Vecchia or Mdina). Soon both islands were in a state of full rebellion, and the Maltese formed a National Assembly. The French forces retreated in the fortified cities around the harbour, while the Maltese petitioned for help from the Kingdom of the Two Sicilies and Great Britain.

During the blockade of the cities, hundreds of people were dying from starvation and deprivation. Elements from within the fortress hence decided to risk their life in order to resolve the situation, and these were led by Xerri. The Maltese planned an attack against the French forces in Valletta and in Cottonera, but the French forces discovered the plot. Amongst the 49 persons captured in the ensuing investigation, there was Dun Mikiel Xerri.

In the morning of January 17, 1799, the archbishop of Malta, Labini, visited Xerri and his companions. The prisoners were taken from Fort Saint Elmo to Palace Square, where a platoon of soldiers were waiting for them. On their way to the square, Dun Mikiel encouraged his companions, and when they arrived in the square, he demanded a few minutes to talk to them. After they fortified themselves with prayers, and asking for remission of their sins, Xerri gave a silver watch to the official on duty and asked him to shoot him in the heart. Then he turned on the crowd in the square, and with the others he shouted; "May God have Mercy on us! Long live Malta!" They were then shot in the square, but they were then taken to the chapel of Saint Rocco, where they were finished off. The large part of these men were buried on the side of the church of Saint Publius in Floriana.
