= Castronuovo di Sant'Andrea =

- Comune
- Comune di Castronuovo di Sant'Andrea
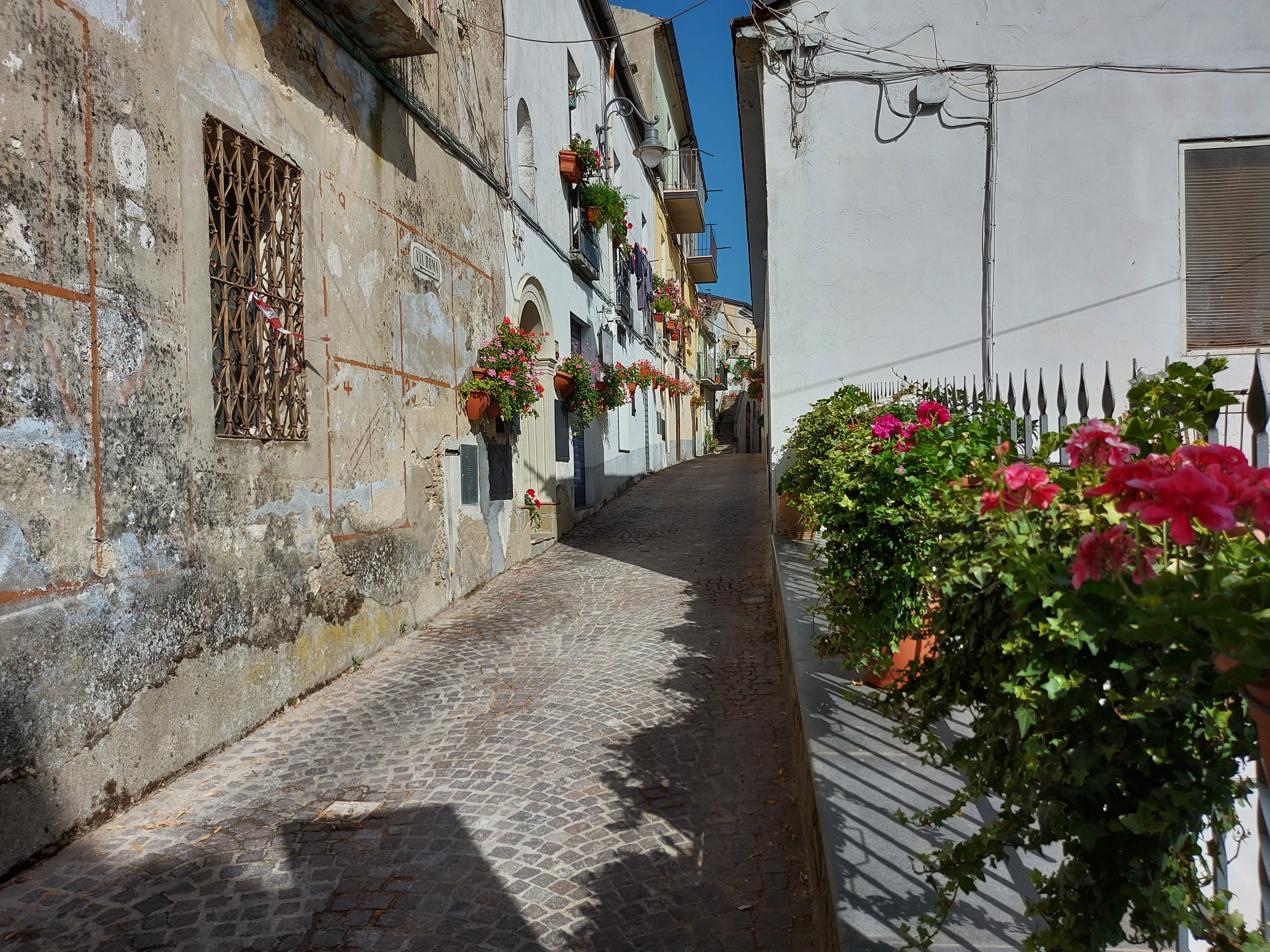
- An image of Castronuovo di Sant'Andrea

- Location within Italy Location within Basilicata
- Coordinates: 40°11′N 16°11′E
- Country: Italy
- Region: Basilicata
- Province: Potenza (PZ)

Government
  - Mayor: Antonio Bulfaro (since 2020)

Area
  - Total: 47.45 km^{2} (18.32 sq mi)
- Elevation: 650 m (2,130 ft)

Population (2024)
  - Total: 862
  - Density: 18.2/km^{2} (47.1/sq mi)
- Demonym: Castronovesi
- Time zone: UTC+1 (CET)
  - Summer (DST): UTC+2 (CEST)
- Postal code: 85030
- Dialing code: 0973
- ISTAT code: 076026
- Patron saint: St. Andrew
- Saint day: 13 August
- Website: Official website

Castronuovo di Sant'Andrea is a town and comune in the province of Potenza, in the Southern Italian region of Basilicata.

The village of Castronuovo di Sant'Andrea, in the province of Potenza, near Armento, Basilicata, owes its foundation and its name to Saint Vitalis of Castronovo who used to live as a hermit in this area. The saint was mindful of his native city of Castronovo in Sicily, hence the name. The specification "of Sant'Andrea" was added centuries later.
