= Hermit of Santa Maria della Stella =

Hermitage in Pazzano, Italy

Coordinates: 38.4680°N 16.4489°E

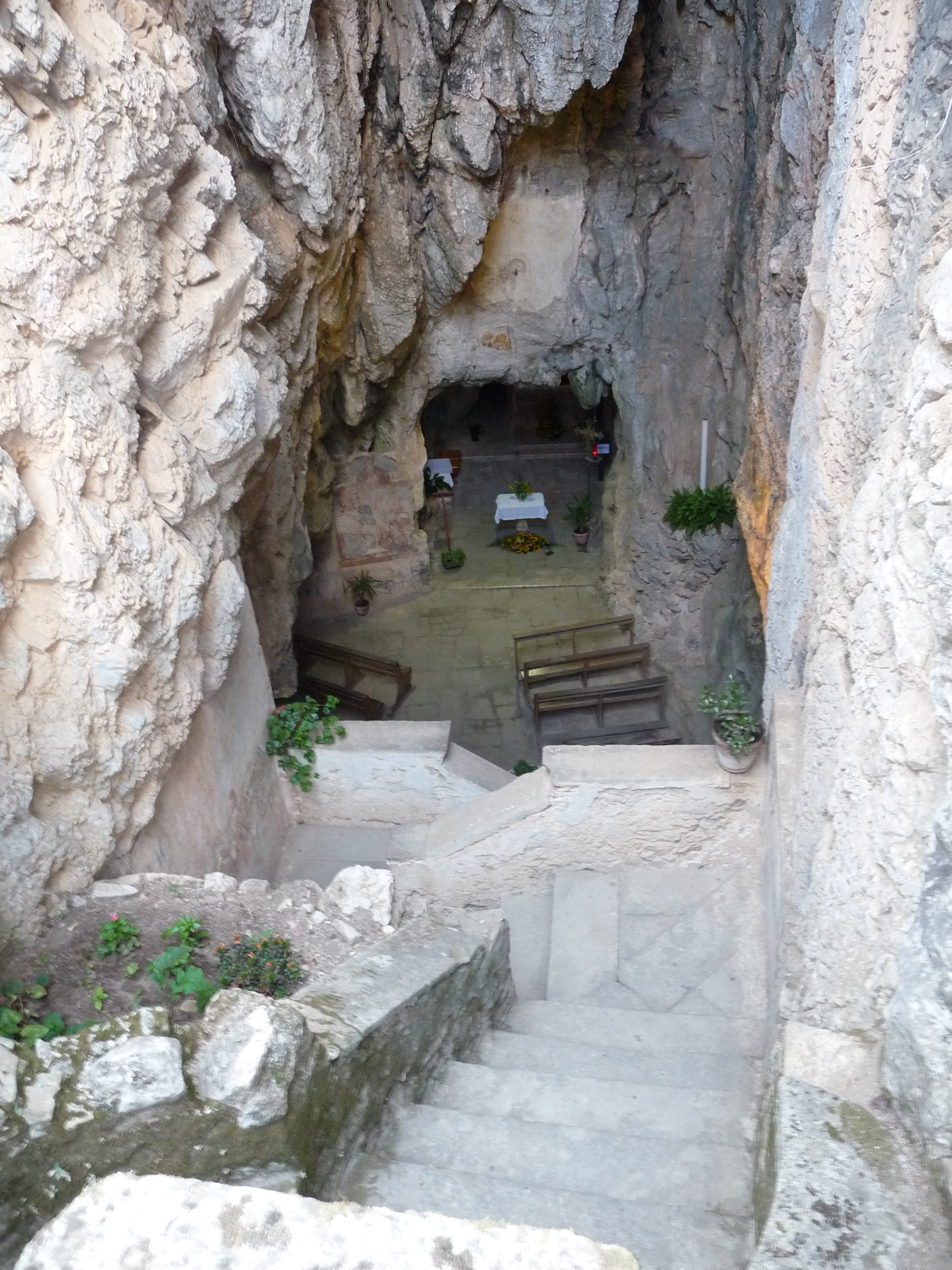
Cave of Monte Stella

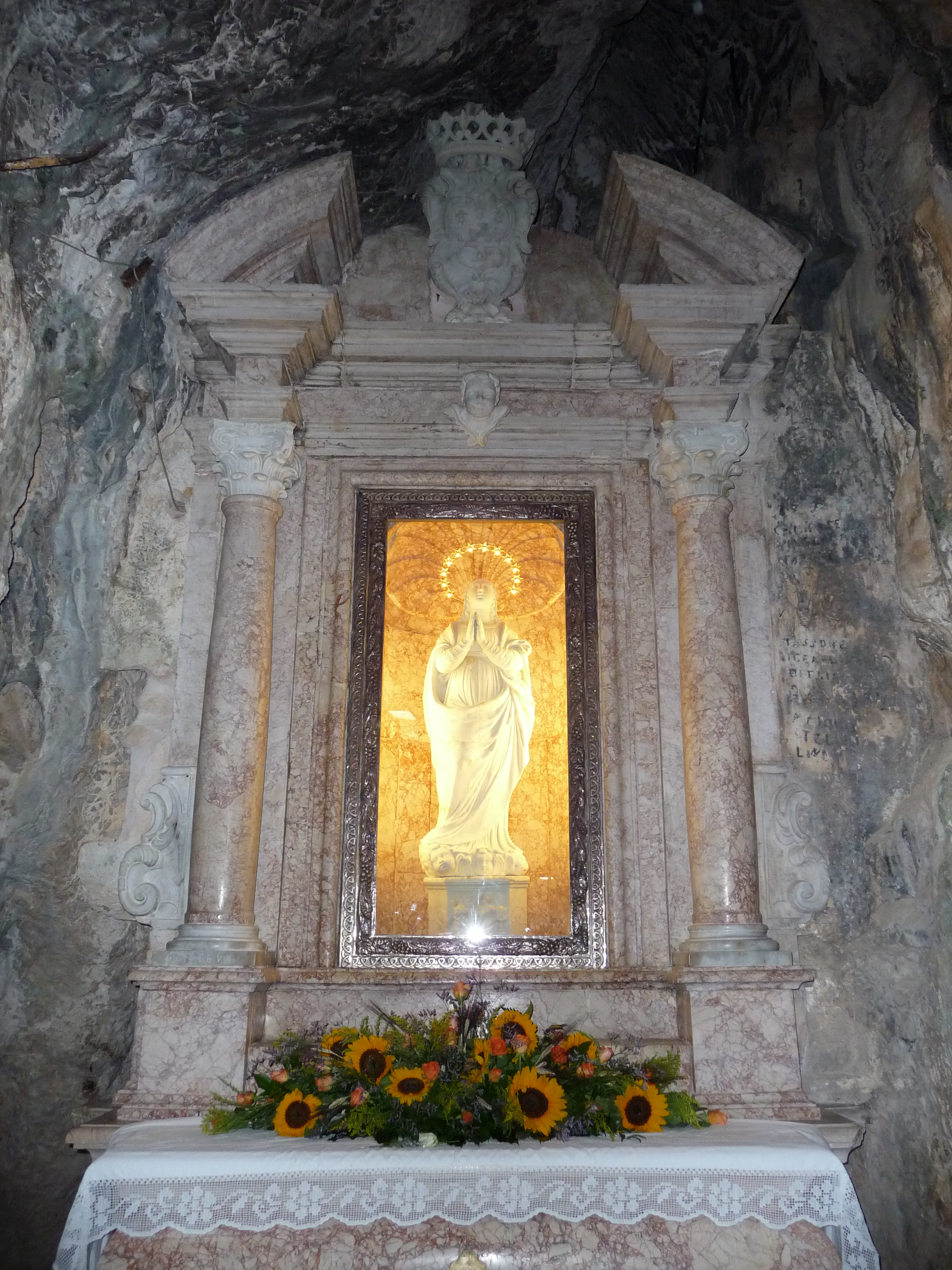
Madonna della Stella statue

Song of the legend of Maria of Monte Stella sung by Maria Bombardiere in Pazzanese dialect (calabrian)

Hermit of Santa Maria della Stella or Sanctuary of Santa Maria della Stella (in English: Sanctuary of Saint Mary of the Star) is an Italian Hermitage, situated in a natural cave at Pazzano (Calabria) on Monte Stella in Calabria, Italy.

From Pazzano, along ex SS110, after 5 km take a fork on the left to peak of Monte Stella and after 1 km there is Monastery of Monte Stella and beside the cave. There are 62 steps before the entrance of the cave. There is a 16th-century statue of Madonna in marble and Byzantine frescos representing saints.

== History ==
Its first mention was Greek code 598 of Paris. In the 11th century Byzantine monks lived in the sanctuary. Cristodulo was one of the first the Hegumen. In 1096, it became a minor monastery. In the Norman period it was converted to a Catholic monastery. In the 15th century, it became independent from San Giovanni Theristis monastery and Basilians abandoned the sanctuary.

The first pastor is supposed to have been Marcello Jhodarelli in 1670.

== Feast ==
Every year, on the 15th of August it celebrates the assumption of the Virgin Mary.

== See also ==
- Monte Stella
- Pazzano
