= San Filippo, Agira =

Church in Agira, Italy

Coordinates: 37.65713°N 14.51856°E

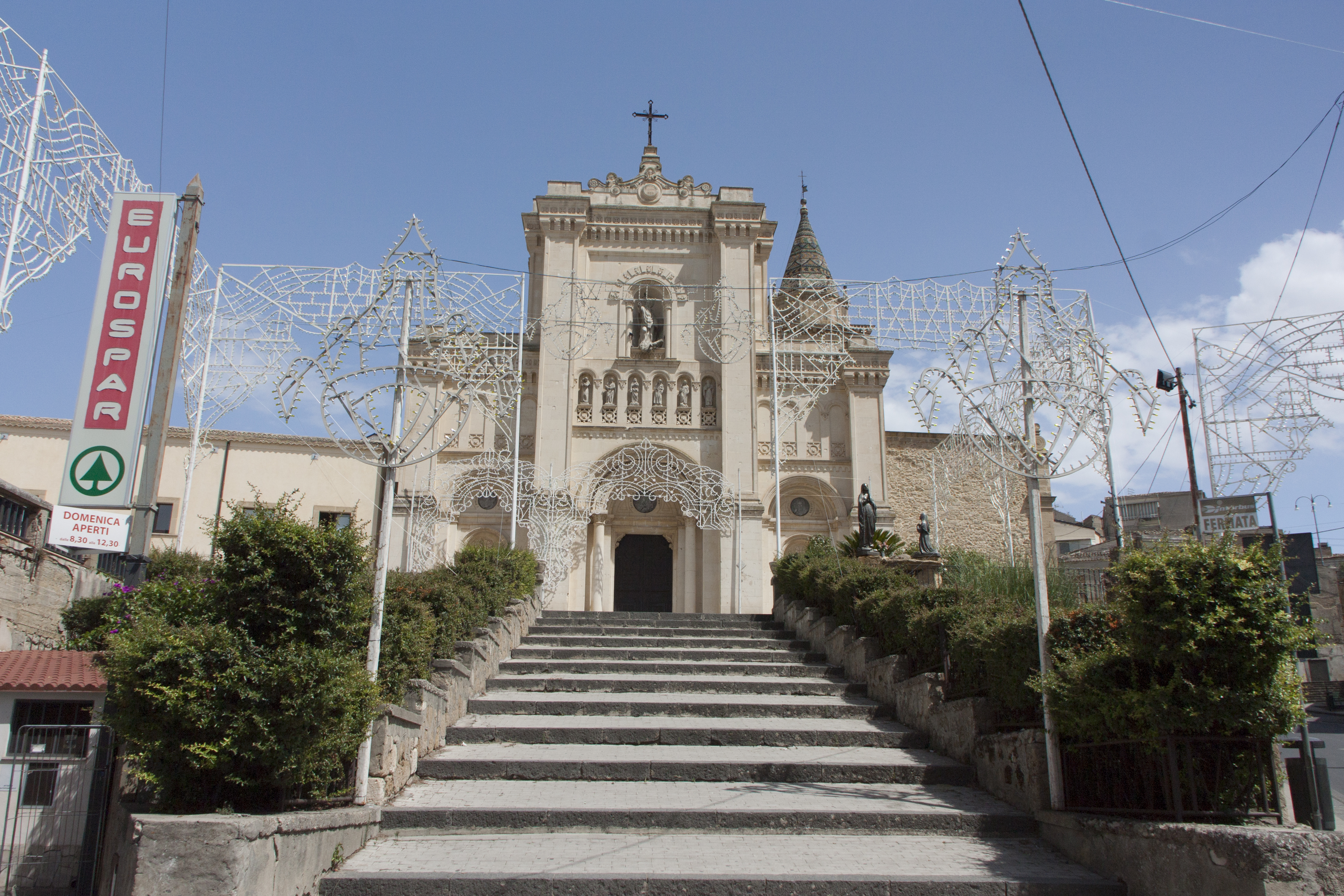
Facade

The church of the Abbey of San Filippo d'Agira is located in Piazza Abbazia #1 in the town of Agira, province of Enna, region of Sicily, Italy. It is also referred to as the Reale Abbazia or royal abbey.

== History ==
The monastery was founded in the 7th or 8th century by Basilian monks. It is dedicated to Philip of Agira, whose hagiography was recalled by Eusebius and the author known as Pseudo-Athanasius. Phillip is said to have been one of the original Christian missionaries to Sicily and putatively was buried beneath this church in Agira. The monastery continued to exist under the Muslim Emirate of Sicily, and monks from here left to found monasteries elsewhere, including in Calabria.

After the Norman conquest of Sicily, the monastery became a Benedictine abbey, and was refurbished by Count Roger I of Sicily between 1095 and 1101. The monastery was suffragan of the first institution of the Latin rite in Jerusalem, the renowned Benedictine abbey affiliated with Santa Maria Latina in Jerusalem. The abbot of the monastery in the Crusader kingdom was forced to move to Sicily with the Muslim capture of Acre in the 1291. A document from 1273 refers to this monastery as San Filippo di Latina. By the 14th century, the abbott of the monastery was represented by members of the Paternò family of Catania; while in the mid-16th century by members of the Aiutamicristo family of Palermo.

However, in the subsequent century, there were concerns about the lax practice of the Benedictine monks and decline of the economic support of the monastery. In 1632 the commendatory abbot, Cardinal Scipione Borghese, replaced the Benedictine fathers with secular priests. The monks were moved to the larger Benedictine Monastery of San Nicolò l'Arena in Catania. By the second half of the 17th century, the church was assigned members of the Colonna da Egidio family. Ultimately in 1862, the monastery was suppressed and in 1924, the church became a parish of the town.

== Art and Architecture ==
The church building has undergone multiple reconstructions over the centuries. The original Basilian structure likely only possessed a single altar, however a larger church was built in the 15th and 16th century. Among the architects was Cadorna. However, little of this structure remains. The facade collapsed after a storm in 1911, and the present replacement was designed by G. Greco, and built between 1916 and 1928. The facade has six niches with statues of the patrons of Agira. The medallion above the main portal depicts the church of Santa Maria Latina.

The interior has a central nave divided from the aisles by pink marble columns. On the left, an altar houses three panels of a 15th-century polyptych depicting the Madonna and Child, St Benedict, and St Calogerus the Anchorite. Also along the left wall are panels depicting the Nativity and Adoration of the Magi attributed to the late 16th-century Master of the Castelbuono Polyptych. Other paintings in the church and sacristy were commissioned from the late-Baroque painters Olivio Sozzi and Filippo Randazzo. The paintings (1759) by Sozzi include:

- Madonna and Child between St Benedict and St Basil, St Agatha in glory
- Crucifix with the Virgin of Sorrows
- Penitent Magdalene and the Holy Family

The paintings (1745-1746) by Randazzo include:

- Madonna of the Rosary among the saints Cajetan, Dominic and Catherine
- Madonna of Monserrate
- Depiction of Grand count Ruggero I of Sicily
- Portrait of Abbot Girolamo Colonna

Inside the church, is a grotto where the putative tomb of St Phillip was discovered in 1596. It putatively had been walled up to hide it during the Arab rule. A sculpted marble figure of the recumbent saint was sculpted in the 16th century, and attributed to Francesco Mendola, a pupil of Antonello Gagini. The apse wooden choir stalls (1818-1822) were engraved by Nicolò Bagnasco with scenes from the Life of St Phillip. The main altar was completed in 1960 by G. Leone; it replaces the former gilded wood altar of the late 18th century. Above the altar is a crucifix carved by friar Umile da Petralia (mid-17th century), and deriving originally from the convent of Santa Maria di Gesù.

The church also houses a life-size 17th-century silver depiction of the bust of the saint (1652) made by Pietro Juvarra, which along with a silver ark containing relics, is paraded through town in processions. The abbey has a collection of written materials, including books from the 15th-century and documents dating from the 11th century.
