= Agira =

Agira Aggira (Sicilian)
- Comune
- Comune di Agira
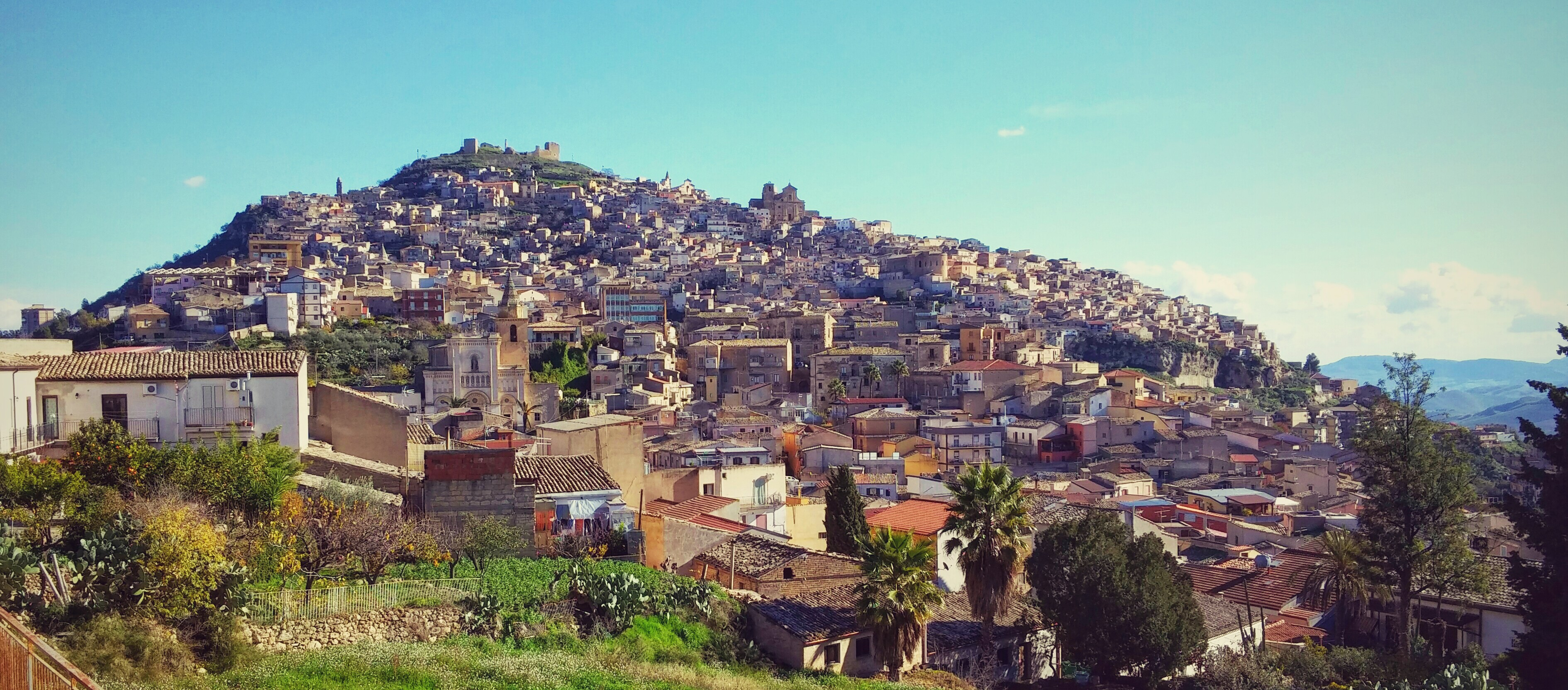
- View of Agira

- Location of Agira in Italy Agira (Sicily)
- Coordinates: 37°39′N 14°31′E
- Country: Italy
- Region: Sicily
- Province: Enna (EN)
- Frazioni: Sant'Anna

Government
  - Mayor: Maria Gaetana Greco

Area
  - Total: 164.08 km^{2} (63.35 sq mi)
- Elevation: 650 m (2,130 ft)

Population (2026)
  - Total: 7,529
  - Density: 45.89/km^{2} (118.8/sq mi)
- Demonym: Agirini
- Time zone: UTC+1 (CET)
  - Summer (DST): UTC+2 (CEST)
- Postal code: 94011
- Dialing code: 0935
- Patron saint: St. Philip of Agira
- Saint day: July 2
- Website: Official website

Agira (Italian: [aˈdʒiːra]; Sicilian: Aggira; Ancient Greek: Ἀγύριον, romanized: Agúrion) is a town and municipality (comune) in the Province of Enna in the autonomous island region of Sicily in Italy. It is located in the mid-valley of the River Salso, 35 kilometres (22 miles) from Enna. Until 1861 it was called San Filippo d'Argiriò, in honour of its saint Philip of Agira. It has 7,529 inhabitants.

It is one of I Borghi più belli d'Italia ("The most beautiful villages of Italy"). The modern city overlies the ancient one of which few traces remain.

== History ==
Agira stands on the site of the ancient Sicel city of Agyrion (Ancient Greek: Ἀγύριον - Agyrion), or Agyrium, or Agyrina,

On the top of the mountain where the castle stands, excavations have brought to light buildings dated between the sixth and fourth centuries BC with the presence of polychrome plaster and remains of the mint for coins.

Diodorus Siculus was born here and credits Heracles with the foundation of sacred precincts of Iolaus and of Geryon, and the creation of a nearby lake. In the mid-fifth century, Agyrium was the first Sicilian city to mint bronze coinage in the Greek fashion of Magna Graecia.

In the 4th c. BC it was ruled by tyrants, one of whom, Agyris, was the most powerful ruler in the centre of Sicily. He was a contemporary of Dionysius the Elder, and with him successfully resisted the Carthaginian forces led by Mago when they invaded the territory of Agyrium in 392 BC. Agira was not colonised by the Greeks until the Corinthian general Timoleon drove out the last tyrant in 339 BC, settled 10,000 Greeks, according to Diodorus Siculus, and erected various splendid buildings.

In around 287 BC Phintias of Agrigentum conquered the city, but after he had shown himself a bloodthirsty murderer, Agyrion was the first city to revolt after which he changed his ways to a more humane rule.

The Romans called it Agyrium. Cicero described it thus:

"And first be briefed on the illustrious and faithful people of Agyrium. Agyrium is among the first as an honest city in Sicily, whose men were, before this commissioner came, rich and among the best farmers."

Under Roman control it underwent a decline like other Sicilian cities as a result of the misrule of Verres and the heavy taxation imposed on it.

One of the only two Greek inscriptions from Agyrium marks the final resting-place of a "Diodorus the son of Apollonius."

In 1063, it was taken by the Normans under Count Roger I of Sicily (Ruggero in Italian), who defeated the Saracens near the river Salso. Agira is mentioned by Muhammad al-Idrisi by the name Shanta Fīlibb (i.e., Saint Philip of Agira), written as شنت فيلب in the Arabic script.

Agira passed through the hands of the Hohenstaufen, the Angevines and Aragonese, and in about 1400 it became state property of Sicily. Over the years the town has been influenced by Spanish and Jewish arrivals, both leaving their architectural mark, the latter a synagogue.

== Demographics ==
As of 2026, the population is 7,529, of which 49.5% are male, and 50.5% are female. Minors make up 15.7% of the population, and seniors make up 23.7%.

Historical population

| Year | Pop. | ±% |
|---|---|---|
| 1861 | 11,588 | — |
| 1871 | 11,838 | +2.2% |
| 1881 | 13,698 | +15.7% |
| 1901 | 17,634 | +28.7% |
| 1911 | 22,480 | +27.5% |
| 1921 | 25,717 | +14.4% |
| 1931 | 15,443 | −40.0% |
| 1936 | 15,350 | −0.6% |

| Year | Pop. | ±% |
|---|---|---|
| 1951 | 16,528 | +7.7% |
| 1961 | 14,079 | −14.8% |
| 1971 | 11,814 | −16.1% |
| 1981 | 9,146 | −22.6% |
| 1991 | 9,150 | +0.0% |
| 2001 | 8,348 | −8.8% |
| 2011 | 8,484 | +1.6% |
| 2021 | 7,726 | −8.9% |

Source: ISTAT

=== Immigration ===
Foreign population by country of birth (2025)
| Country of birth | Population |
|---|---|
| Germany | 169 |
| Romania | 41 |
| France | 20 |
| Belgium | 15 |
| Colombia | 13 |
| Tunisia | 12 |
| Netherlands | 11 |
| Senegal | 7 |
| Australia | 6 |
| Bangladesh | 5 |
| The Gambia | 5 |
| Nigeria | 5 |
| Switzerland | 5 |
| Argentina | 4 |
| Albania | 3 |

As of 2025, immigrants make up 4.7% of the total population. The 5 largest foreign countries of birth are Germany, Romania, France, Belgium, and Colombia.

== Main sights ==
The town has a number of notable churches:

- Chiesa Madre ("Mother Church"): Norman church dedicated to Santa Maria Maggiore
- Santa Margherita: Norman church founded in 13th century, but rebuilt over centuries, is the largest in the diocese, with thirteen altars
- San Filippo: church with central nave and two aisles, and contains paintings by Olivo Sozzi
- Sant'Antonio da Padova:16th-century church
- Sant'Antonio Abate: 16th-century church containing fourteen small paintings of the Venetian school
- San Salvatore: church with Gothic bell-tower.

There is also an Arab–Byzantine castle, later rebuilt by the Hohenstaufen, of which two towers still stand.

The Pozzillo artificial lake lies near the town in a eucalyptus wood, and provides a habitat for a large variety of birds, and a way-stage for migrators. Another reserve – the Riserva di Piano della Corte – has been created in the Erean Mountains, and the Mediterranean forest of the Vallone di Piano della Corte is scheduled to become another reserve. The area also contains sulphur springs.

== Economy ==
The town is a centre of agriculture: productions include cereals, almonds, olives, and grapes. The large areas of pasture also make possible the breeding of cattle, sheep, and horses.

== Transport ==
There is a railway station south of the town.

== Twin towns and sister cities ==
Agira is twinned with:

- Żebbuġ, Malta
