= Philip of Agira =

Early Christian priest and saint

Saint Philip of Agira
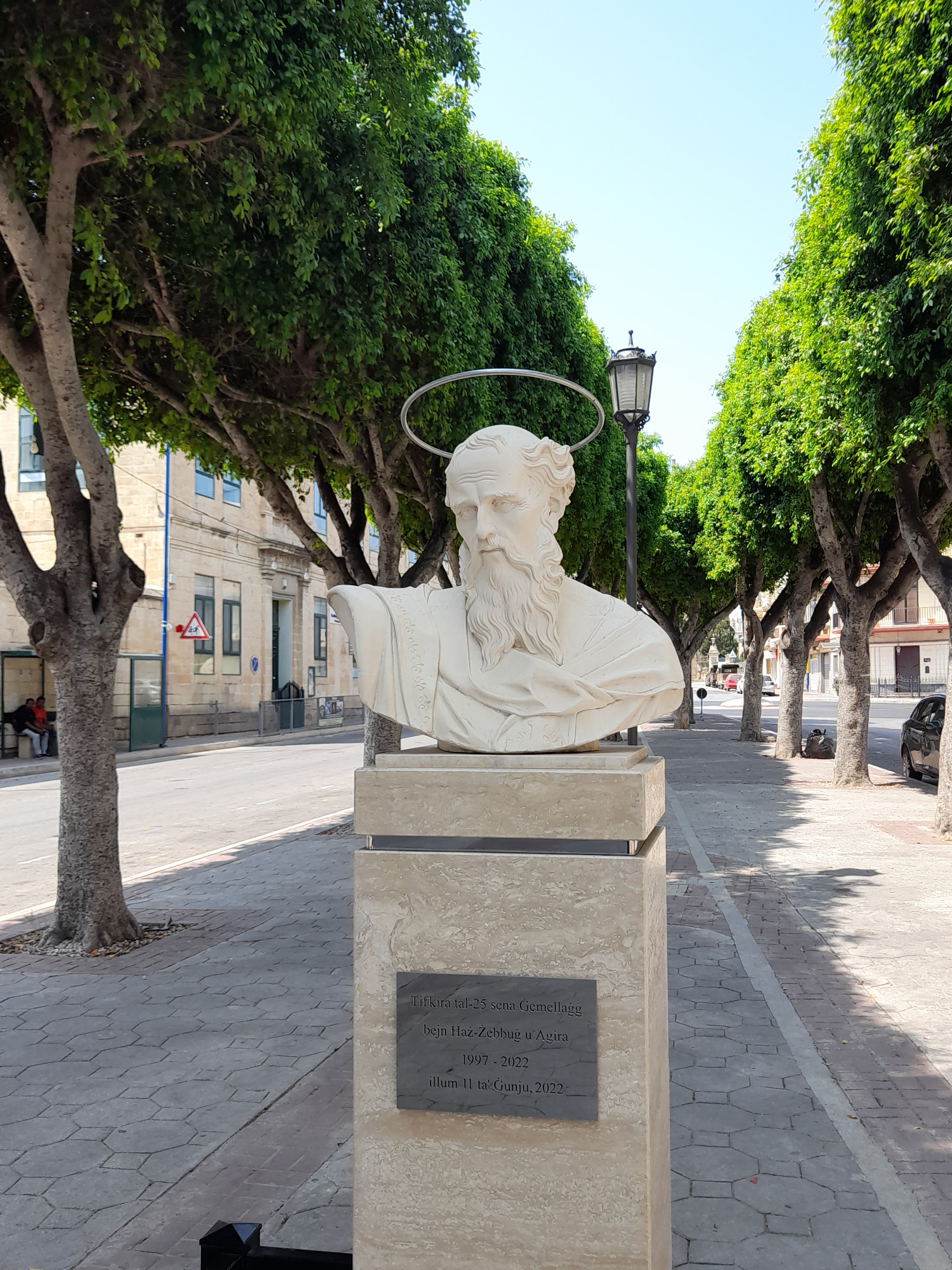
- Bust of Saint Philip of Agira, Żebbuġ, Malta

Apostle to the Sicilians, Hieromartyr
- Born: AD 40 or 5th century Cappadocia or Thrace (modern-day Turkey)
- Died: 12 May 103; Sicily (?) (modern-day Italy)
- Venerated in: Catholic Church; Eastern Orthodox Church
- Feast: 12 May
- Patronage: Agira, Sicily, Italy; Żebbuġ, Malta; United States Army Special Forces

Philip of Agira (also Argirò, Aggira, Agirone, Agirya or Argira) was an early Christian clergyman. There are two parallel stories of this saint which give to possible dates in which this saint lived. Traditionally, through the writings ascribed to Athanasius of Alexandria, it is maintained that Philip of Agira is a saint of the 1st century, born in the year 40 in Cappadocia (modern Turkey) and died as a hieromartyr on 12 May 103. The other version of his biography, attributed to a certain Eusebio, says to have been born of Theodosius, a Syrian father, and Augia, a noble Roman woman, in Thrace in the time of Emperor Arcadius, 4th century. His older brothers drowned while fishing and Philip dedicated himself to the service of God. Philip was later sent by the pope to preach in Sicily, where he performed many miracles, especially exorcisms. Philip was known as the "Apostle of the Sicilians", as he was the first Christian missionary to visit that island. Nothing else can be certainly stated about him.

== Veneration ==
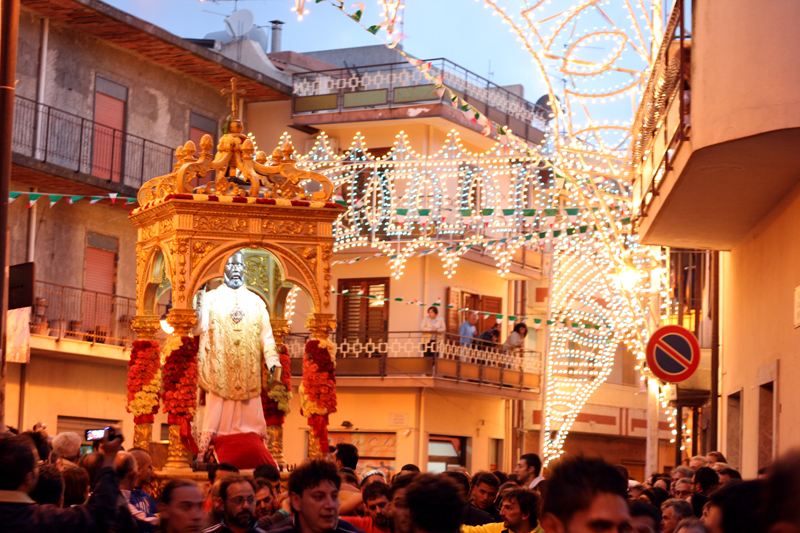
San Filippo d'Agira celebrated at Limina, Sicily, the 11–12 and third Sunday of May

His feast day is 12 May. He is the patron saint of the city of Agira, Sicily, and of the city of Żebbuġ, Malta; he is celebrated also in the town of Limina, Sicily, where he also lived. Putatively, his relics were discovered in the church dedicated to him in Agira. Philip is one of the patron saints of the United States Army Special Forces and also known for his power to perform exorcisms.

== Sources ==
- Il portale di Agira
- History, life, miracles of St. Philip of Agira
