= Riserva regionale Lago piccolo di Monticchio =

Nature reserve in Italy

- IUCN category IV (habitat/species management area)
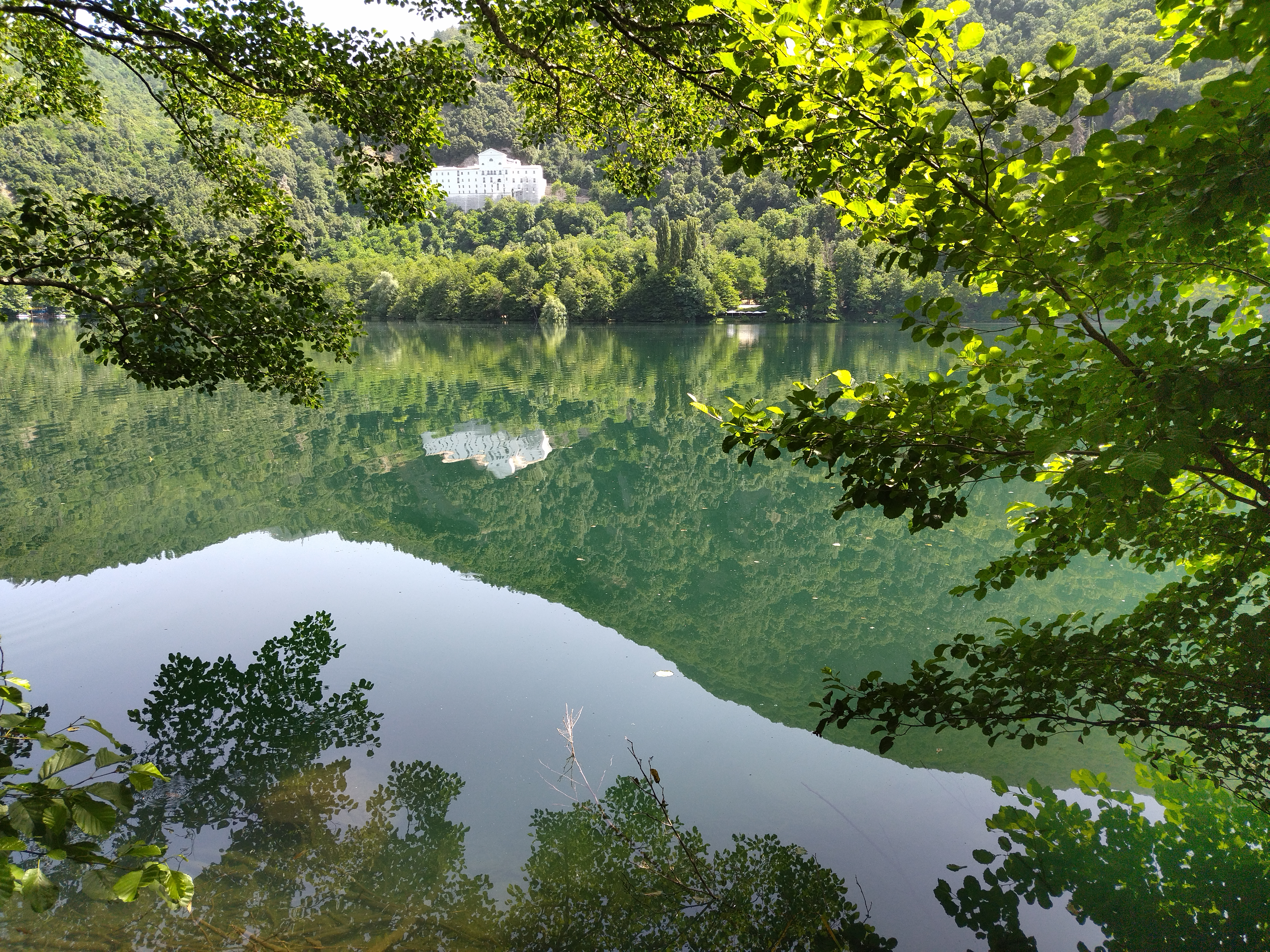
- The lake and the San Michele Abbey

- Location within Italy
- Location: Basilicata, Italy
- Nearest city: Rionero in Vulture and Atella
- Coordinates: 40°56′00.6″N 15°37′08.4″E
- Area: 187 ha (460 acres)
- Established: August 30, 1984
- Administrator: Provincia di Potenza

Riserva regionale Lago piccolo di Monticchio is a 187-hectare (460-acre) nature reserve located in Basilicata, in the comuni of Atella and Rionero in Vulture. It is administered by the Province of Potenza.

The nature reserve consists of one of the two lakes located on the craters of the Monte Vulture, an extinct volcano which last erupted in the Late Pleistocene, 130,000 years ago. Until 1820 there were secondary volcanic activities.

== Colour change ==
Recent studies has approved a characteristic phenomenon related to the lake. In the cold season, while the waters of the big lake ("Lago grande") remain light blue, the waters of the small lake ("Lago piccolo") change to rusty yellow. This happen because the superficial temperature became more cold than the temperature of the low waters, that go up and become oxidized and give to the lake a characteristic colour. Then the iron oxide, that is more heavy than the water, falls to the bottom and the original colour of the lake returns.

== Flora and fauna ==
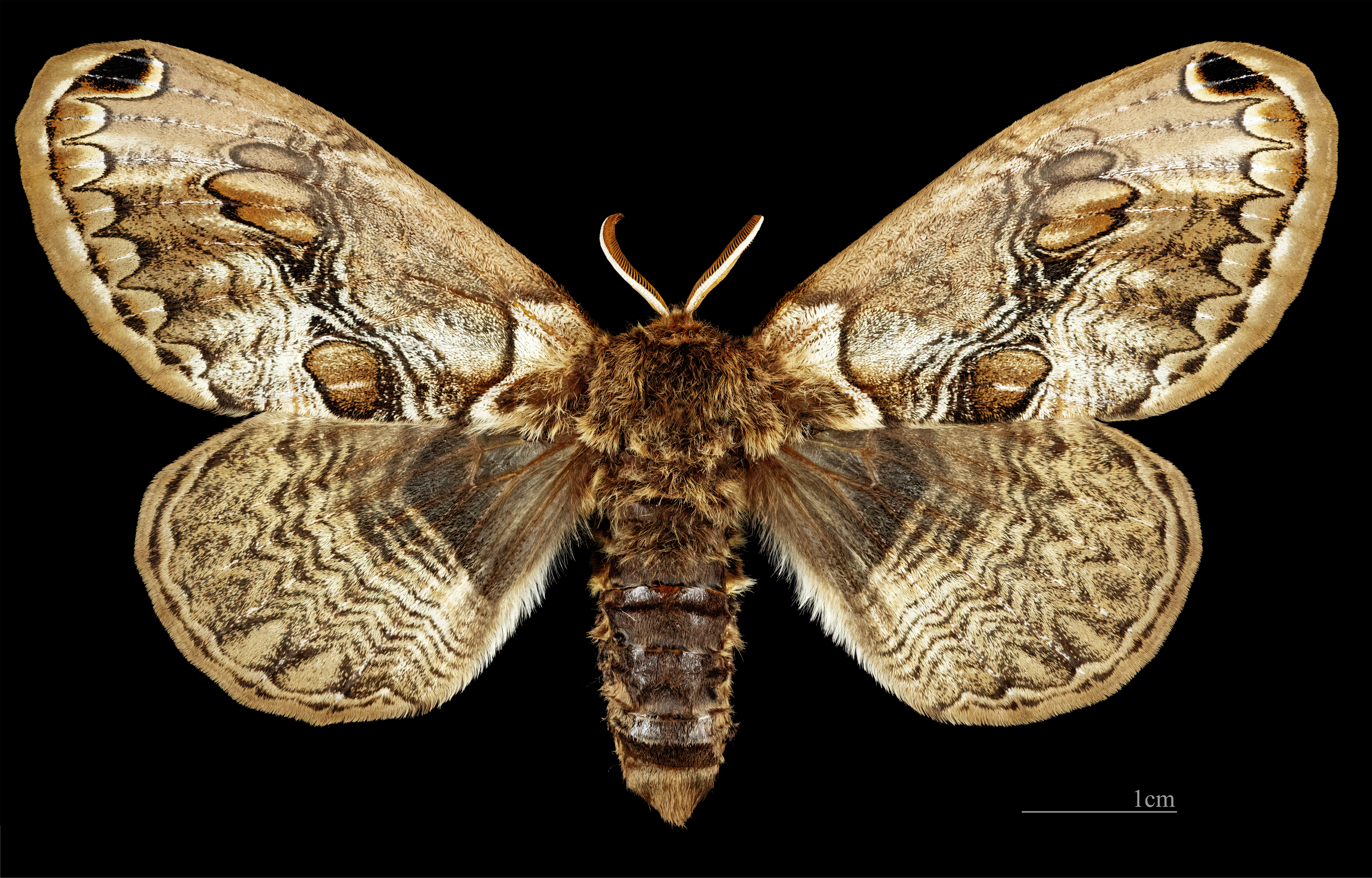
Brahmaea europaea

The most important faunal presence is the Brahmaea europaea, discovered by Federico Hartig in 1963. It's a moth with a wingspan of 7 cm and is the only species of the Brahmaeidae family that live in Europe. In the Park there are also species attributable to before the anthropization started during the fascism in Italy and after the WWII. In the lake's waters, there are different species of freshwater fish: eel, tench and freshwater crab. There are also the perch, the largemouth pass, eastern mosquitofish and the carp, imported by the Padano-Veneto district.

The shores of the lake have beech trees.

== Tourism ==
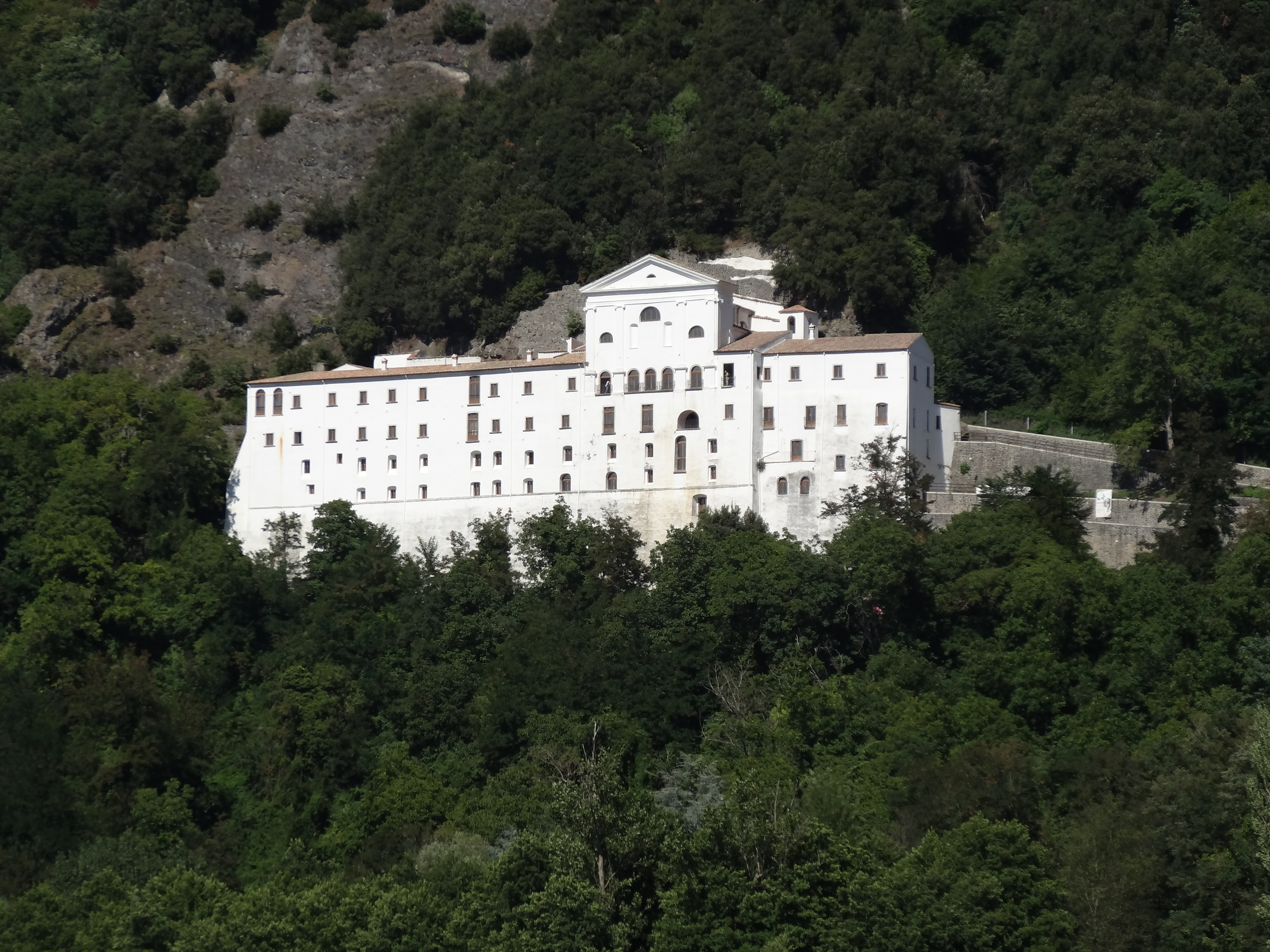
Abbey of San Michele

The protected area has become attractive to tourists because of the uncontaminated position. Here, we can find the San Michele Abbey, an ancient abbey dug into the tuff. There is a pier, where you can rent pedalo.

== See also ==
- San Michele Abbey, Monticchio
- Monticchio
- Province of Potenza
- Basilicata
- Italy
- Monte Vulture
- Atella
- Rionero in Vulture

== Sources ==
- Basilicata (in Italian). Touring editore. 2004. ISBN 88-365-2951-8.
