= Ripacandida =

- Comune
- Comune di Ripacandida
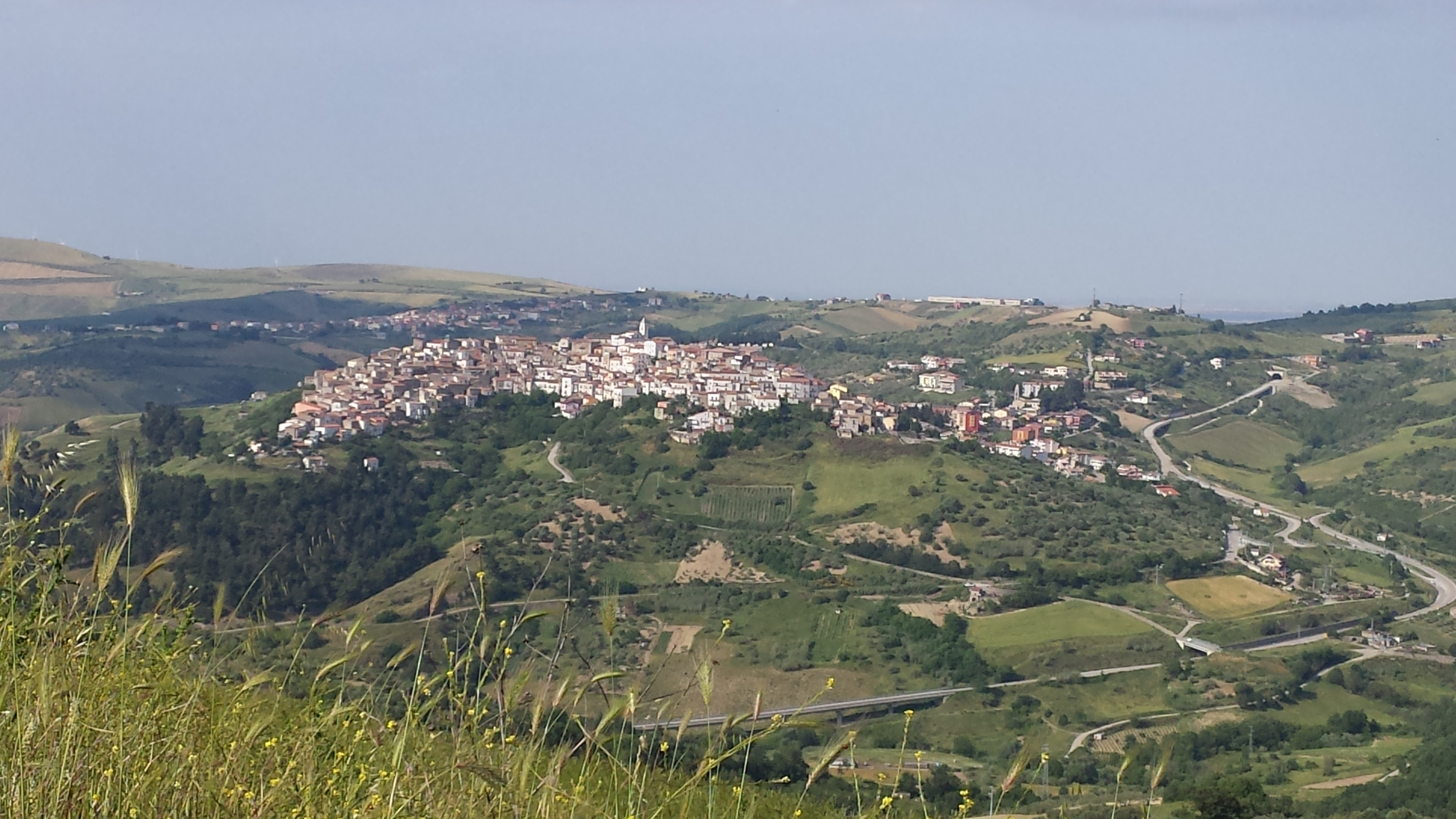
- View of Ripacandida

- Location within Italy Location within Basilicata
- Coordinates: 40°55′N 15°44′E
- Country: Italy
- Region: Basilicata
- Province: Potenza (PZ)
- Frazioni: Serra San Francesco

Area
  - Total: 33 km^{2} (13 sq mi)
- Elevation: 620 m (2,030 ft)

Population (2001)
  - Total: 1,767
  - Density: 54/km^{2} (140/sq mi)
- Demonym: Ripacandidesi
- Time zone: UTC+1 (CET)
  - Summer (DST): UTC+2 (CEST)
- Postal code: 85020
- Dialing code: 0972
- ISTAT code: 076067
- Patron saint: San Donato
- Saint day: 7 August
- Website: Official website

Ripacandida (IPA: [ripaˈkandida]; Ripacandidesi: Rubbuacànnə; Lucano dialect: R'bbacànnə or R'pacànnə) is a town and comune in the province of Potenza, in the Southern Italian region of Basilicata. It is bounded by the comuni of Atella, Barile, Filiano, Forenza, Ginestra, Rionero in Vulture.

== Archaeology ==
The study of the necropolis, seventh-fifth century BC shows that the settlement belongs to a cultural center north of Lucania. It is located near a tributary of the broad stream 'Ofanto and spread on top and on the terraces along the slopes of the hill. In the center is implanted ceramic workshops specialized in the production of decorated vases with subgeometric decoration, or complex decorative motifs, including the human figure appears.

A notable jug found in a female burial of the fifth century BC, has a sphere enclosing a lightning bolt on which there is a stylized human figure in mourning, surrounded by seven stars, now in the National Archaeological Museum of Melfi. This scene leads to the philosophical doctrines of Pythagoras, who had started a school at the same time to Metaponto and which were among his disciples some aristocratic figures of the ancient inland territories of Basilicata.

The ancient village of Ripacandida is organized to scattered groups of inhabited alternating with empty spaces and burials. Of note, always in a female burial, the fermatrecce are very elaborate, consisting of a double wire wrapped in multiple turns and found only a few kits Basilicata inside. Remains of a Roman aqueduct are visible near the broad stream.

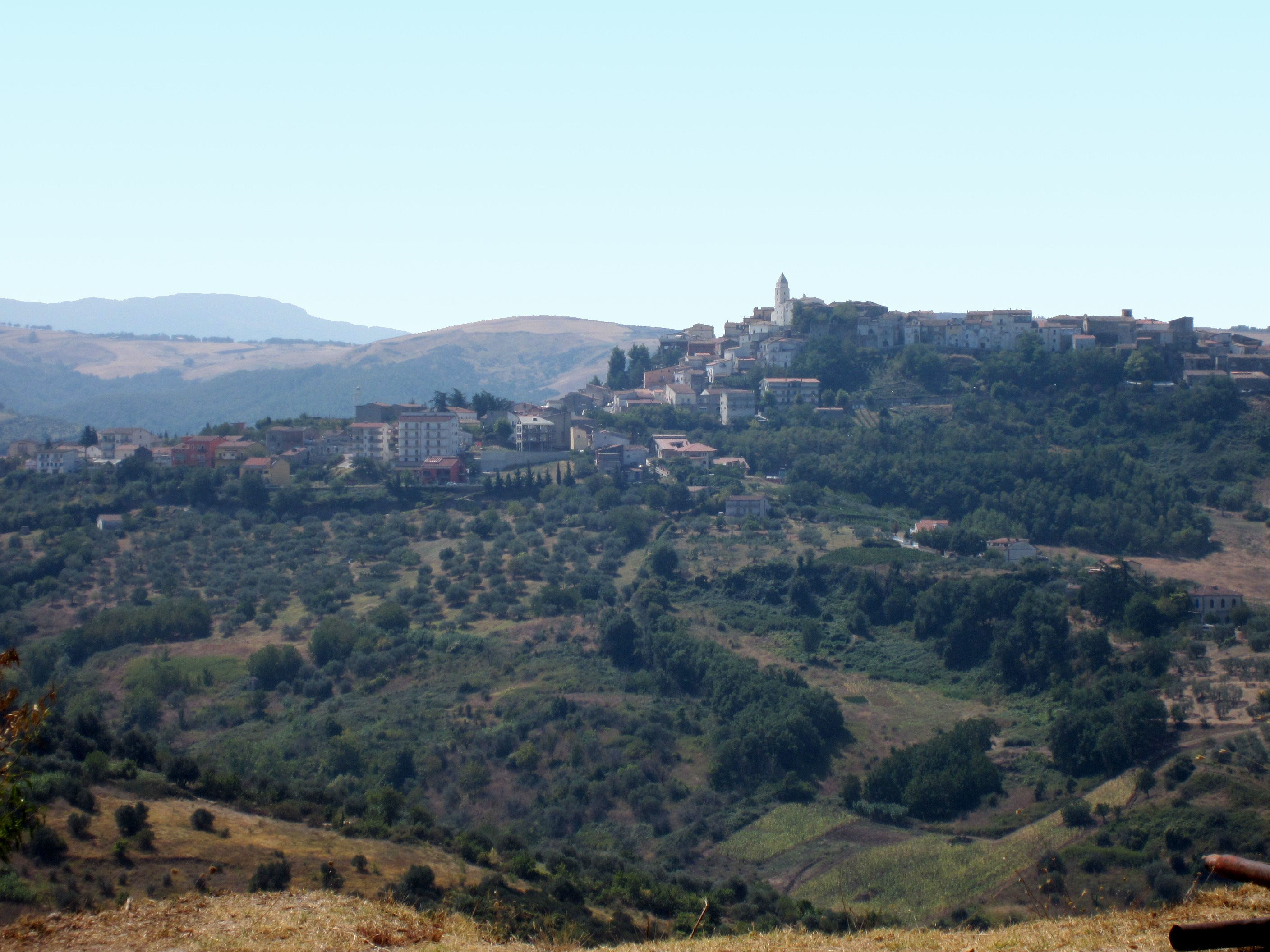
View of Ripacandida, Basilicata, Italy

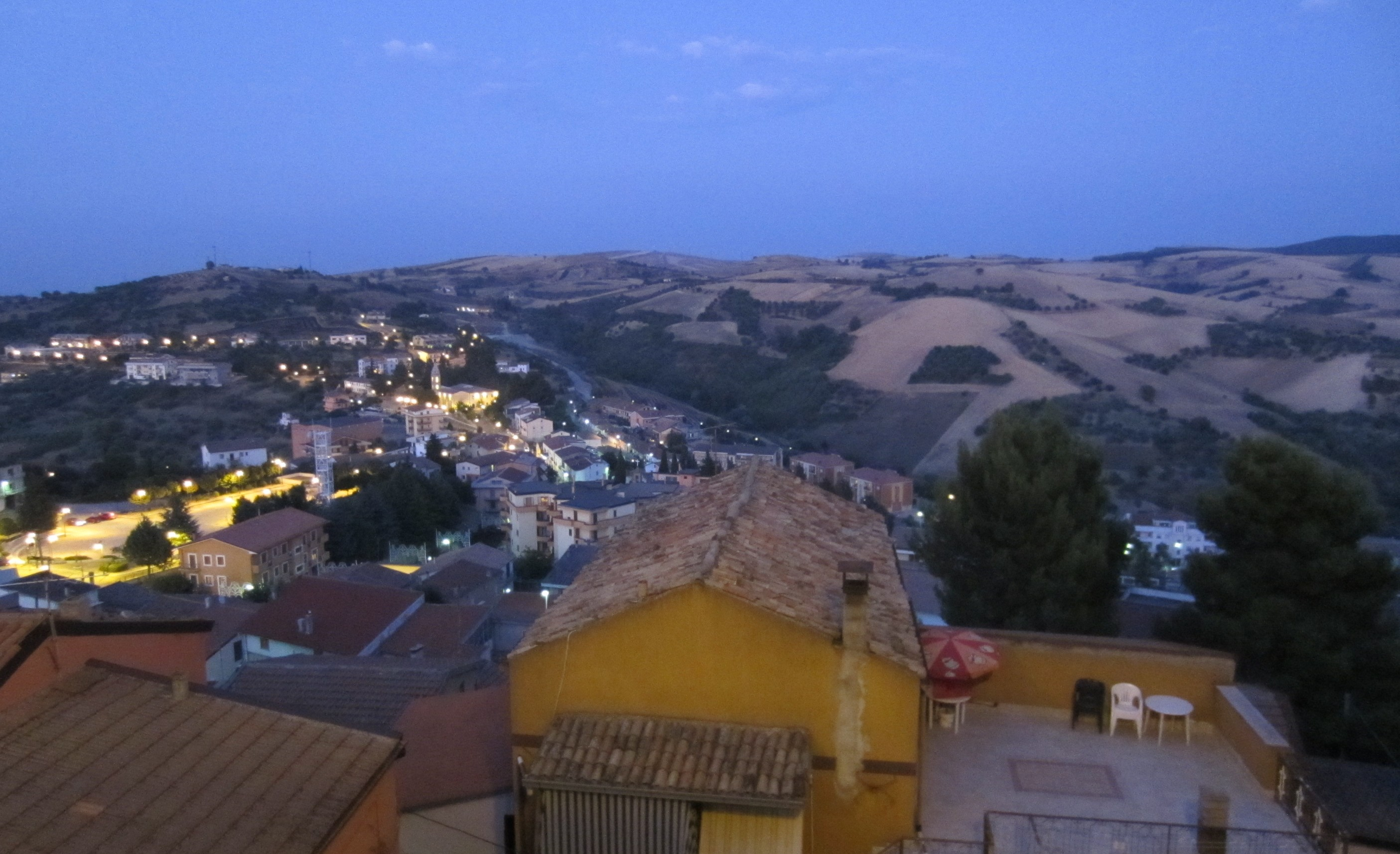
Evening view of hills from Ripacandida

== Geography ==
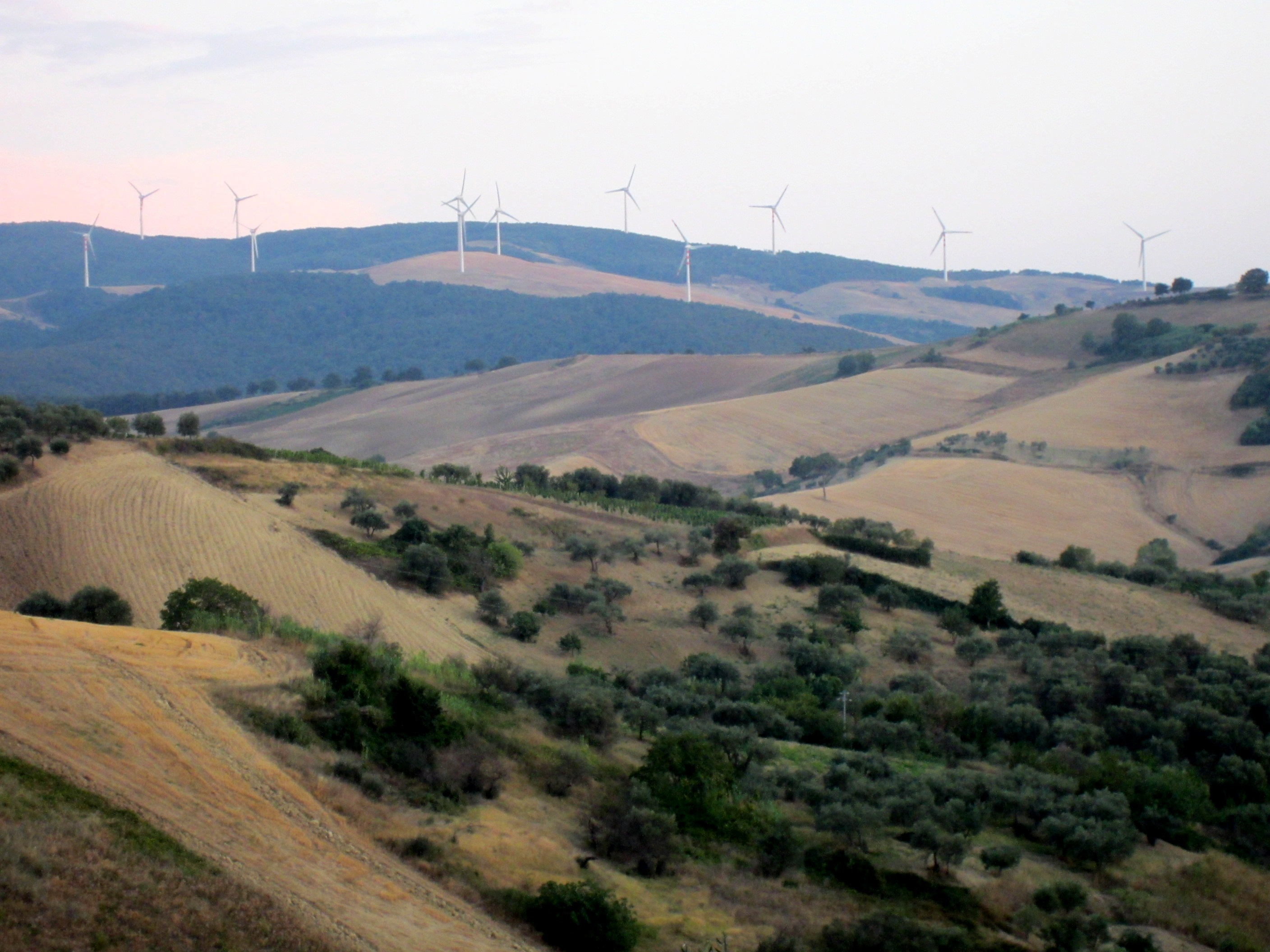
Windmills in fields surrounding Ripacandida, Italy

Ripacandida looks like a neat little town perched on the cliff which dominates the large valleys that surround it, made of whitewashed houses. It stands on one of the many hills in the Vulture, the vast region that stretches south of the river Ofanto (which forms the natural border of the northern Basilicata), region of deep-rooted origins history that is called Melfi. It extends along the slopes of volcanic of Vulture and is a large sub-area of Basilicata region, characterized by the cultivation and production of grapes Aglianico, which gives its name to one of the most renowned regional wines and appreciated, the'Aglianico del Vulture, precisely.

== History ==
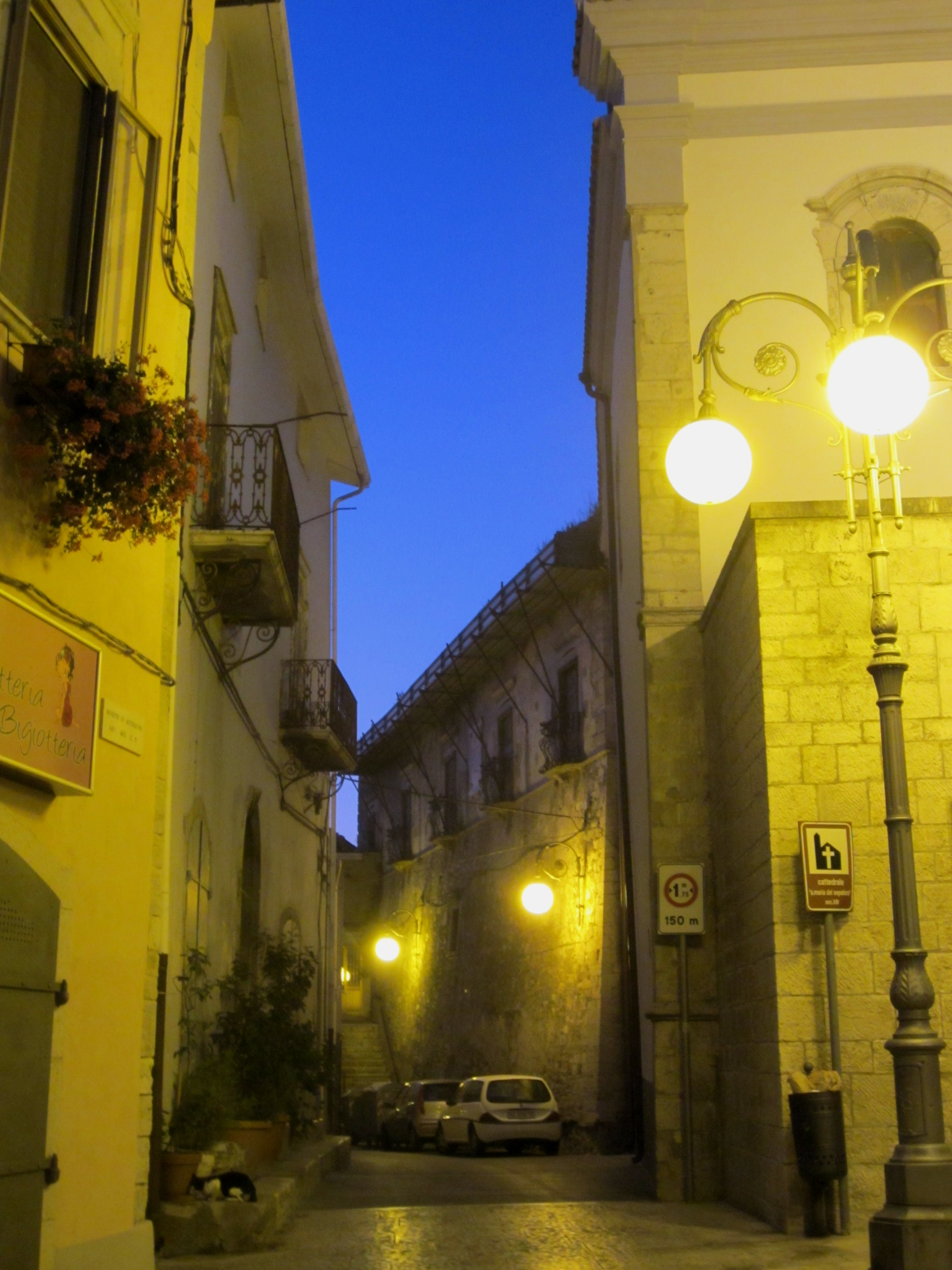
Ripacandida, Italy, evening view of street

The archaeological survey of the years 1977–80 due to the antiquity of Ripacandida the seventh century BC, but by the end of the nineteenth century historian Lucan Michele Lacava found some caves dating archeolitica and floor mosaics at the foot of Ripacandida. The Greek historians (Aristotle, Timaeus, and Antiochus of Syracuse) cite as "Enotria" contemporary Basilicata. FromGeographyof Strabo we learn that "before the arrival of the Greeks on the Ionian coast of Basilicata, and there were Choni Enotri." The second Oenotrian Dionysius of Halicarnassus descended from Oenotrus, originating from the mythical hero 'Arcadia who arrived around 1800 BC, subjugated the indigenous plant and viticulture. His successor, Italy became farmers, pastoralists, instituting the "Syssitia". Later the region was occupied by Samnites, populations Osco-Samnite from which descend the Luciani. They descended from the mountains of Sannio and in several waves occupied the peninsula. They practiced "sacred spring": when the population grew a group of young people choose a symbol (Totem) and partly in search of new lands. It was a nation of proud warriors, powerful enough to bind the Roman army for fifty years. Rome suffered the humiliation of defeat at the Caudine Forks, and then reorganize the army and crush the Samnites. The Romanization of the region came with the transfer of 20 000 settlers, was born near Venus, in 291 BC Samnites are descended from many other ethnic groups: the Hirpini, the Caudini, the Bruttii etc. The Luke Society is organized into tribes, each with its own head i "Meddices" who are elected annually. All are expected to participate in community life, everything is divided equally. Federation linked by a bond, in case of war, elect a head of the basileus. The ancient town of Ripacandida was more important than Serra di Vaglio (Vaglio Basilicata) a few miles from power. The Lucan through rivers: Basento, Bradano, Agri and Sinni traded with the Greek cities (Metaponto, Siris, Heraclea). The Sele and 'Ofanto allow access to both sides: the Adriatic and Tyrrhenian. Dialect idiom (true linguistic island in the neighborhood) we find the root of many words with the Oscan of Greek origin. Oral tradition says that the city was built by the Romans under the name "Candida Latinorum" (remains of Roman aqueduct). Some scholars believe the name is given by the white color of the hill. The modern town dates from the time of invasions Gothic, when the inhabitants moved from the valley on the hill, and build their houses around the temple dedicated to Jupiter (present castle-Church mother). I Lombard the fortified walls interspersed with towers. Undergoing the various dominations arrive at the first written sources of the XI-XII sec. The papal bull Eugenius III (1152) decreed the construction of the churches of San Donato (the only one that still exists), San Pietro, San Zaccaria, San Gregorio. Participates in the First Crusade. And is registered in the Catalogue of the Barons with thirteen nobles, headed by the overlord Roger Marescalco to participate in the Third Crusade to William the Good (1188–1198). A Roberto Ripacandida of Frederick II in charge of guarding prisoners of Lombardy, the region will be called after Massa Lombarda (now Ginestra). Change number of feudal lords, Caracciolo Grimaldi of Monaco, Boccapianola Tironi, the last owner is the Duke Mazzacara (1806). A first colony Albanian refugees in 1482 is housed in a suburban area called Canton and later moved to Massa Lombarda. On 5 October 1571 share in the victory Battle of Lepanto with a large number of citizens including Gianlorenzo Lioy. Between five hundred and seven hundred is home to a study of Theology. In April 1861, sided with the robbers led by Carmine Crocco, on this occasion there was the first victim: the National Guard captain Michael Anastasia. He also had fierce brigands Turtoro, Di Biase, Larotonda.

=== The end of the 19th century: heavy emigration to the United States ===
At the end of the 19th century, the inhabitants of Ripacandida started emigrating in search of a better future, first to Altoona, Pennsylvania and then on to Blue Island, Illinois. Two sons of immigrants from Ripacandida in Blue Island have become famous: boxer Tony Musto, who fought Joe Louis for the World Heavyweight Title on 8 April 1941 and Gary Sinise, an award-winning actor, musician and director, who co-founded Chicago's Steppenwolf Theater Company. In memory of the traditions in Ripacandida, the town of Blue Island celebrates Saint Donatus of Arezzo with its Feast of St. Donatus every year in August. The Nobel Prize in Physics in 1997 was awarded to William Donald Phillips of Pennsylvania, whose mother was born in Ripacandida in 1913 and moved to the United States in 1920.

=== 1940–1960 ===
During the 1940s, Ripacandida was suffering under the wrath of Benito Mussolini. Many of the residents had to find shelter or stay in nearby caves. The Nazis circled all around the town to find all of the Jewish folk. Some died even if they were not Jewish, but died if they were crippled, had dark hair/dark eyes, and were a different culture besides European.

=== 1980–2000 ===
From the 1980s to the early 2000s, German anthropologist Thomas Hauschild (member of the Heidelberg Academy of Sciences and chair in the dpt. for social anthropology at the University at Halle/Saale, Germany) used to document extensively religious and political life in Ripacandida and surroundings. In this, he was supported by many protagonists from the local population, including Michele Ciccarella, Carmela "Quartariegg'" Carlucci Perretta, Vito Gioiosa, Luigi "Ginetto" Gilio, and many others. His findings were edited in the form of numerous articles in scientific journals and in his book "Magie und Macht in Italien" (2002), translated into English by Jeremy Gaines ("Power and Magic in Italy", London and New York, Berghahn publishers, 2011). In 2009, Thomas Hauschild accompanied the famous art historian Hans Belting (Order Pour le Mérite of Arts and Sciences, Berlin and Dumbarton Oaks Institute, Harvard U.) to Ripacandida. On behalf of the local "Pro Loco" association (Gerardo Cripezzi, Luigi Gilio and others), Hans Belting evaluated the frescoes at the San Donato church at Ripacandida and attested to their extraordinary value as a monument in the history of arts. Following Belting, the frescoes reflect impressively periods of peace and unrest, of earthquake and new economic development in the small Lucanian centre. In this occasion, Hans Belting accepted the regional award "Fede e Arte" from the local UNESCO committee and from the Pro Loco. in a highly acclaimed speech, Hans Belting attested for the many "secrets" still hidden in these frescoes for future research.

== Dialect vocabulary of Greek, Arabic and Albanian origin ==
Greek: Burnt by Braccos: hoarseness; Airale: sieve that is used to cleanse the grain from Aire: I choose; Alerta: stand on Aertao: I exalt; Arrampaggio: Harpagus robbery with violence: robbery; Ammannati Amenenoo by: soon weakens; Arrappato: folds from Raptiva, I patch; Arrociliare: enveloped by Kule: vulgar or deception; Ascimo: unfermented bread; Atta'ne: Tata-father from Atta: pater; Butter: a young peasant from Boter: shepherd Cacone: deep hole by Kao: opening; Calanca: landslide Kala-Ekalaca: drop; Calandra: The lark from Akalantis; Kalavroje: Scaravaggi daKarabos; Calamastra: opener hanging on the iron stove, Karusi: haircut Keiro: I cut; Kataratta: hatch Kata: downward '; Kotor: capers! by Katara, Centrino: Kitri from yellow cedar; Kiatto: big and fat; Cozzetto: occiput from Kotido; CuCl: cakes to Kuklos: circle, Enchire: empire from Egketo: breathe; Enmo: desert place: from Eremos-desert; Fomiero: manure; Ravine: water that is poured; Engineer: start using; Isc'i: entry mulattirer; Lagana: Lasagna; Langella: pot of water; Maca'ri God! exclamation; Mara me (bad omen); Maruca: snail; Matreia: stepmother; Mattoli: bundle; Menace: throw by Amun: reject, mingling: small; Mollica: the pith of bread Montone: pile; Morra of sheep flock sheep; Musco: humerus of the body; madness: jokes from Pazio: game; Pernecocca: apricot; Lace: ends; Pruna: plum tree; Quatrala: nubile young girl from Korah and girl-girl Talis; Racana: fabric due; Burr; root; Ranfa: claws of animals, Rasco-scratch: scratch; Rosica: nibble; Rummolo: rounded stone; Salma: soma; Scania loaf of bread; Sceppa: rip; Skizo: drop; Silk: sieve; Sfizio: wishful thinking; Scitt: hunting cats; Sterpone: old tree; Strambo: Crank brain Strummolo: top; Tallo: bud; Tann: then; Tarocciola: pulley; Traccheggiare: hold off; Tumpagno: bottom of the barrel; Tupputi Tupputi: to beat door Turso: core of the cabbage; Tuzzolare: knock on the door; Vallone: narrow ditch; Brag: apron: Launch: Opening; Visciole: vesicles; Zimmari: the goat; Zitella: servant; Zito: husband. The Greek words are transcribed in English letters. On the deep influence of Albanic language on the local dialect see also: https://web.archive.org/web/20111011091746/http://contrasto.de/lucano.htm and Dialetti_lucani. Much vocabulary in the local dialects at Ripacandia -and in Northern Lucania in general -is also deduced from the Arabic language, for example "vadone" from "al wadi" for "river stream". See: Bigalke, Rainer: "Dizionario dialettale della basilicata|Con un breve saggio della fonetica, un'introduzione sulla storia dei dialetti lucani e note etimologiche", Muenster, 1980. German linguist Bigalke did his fieldwork in the 1980s all over the Basilicata and shortly also at Ripacandida.

== Monuments of interest ==
The center of town has architecture of mainly the 18th and 19th century. The exception is the Casa Lioy, a palace built in 1089 with subsequent reconstructions.

=== Religious architecture ===
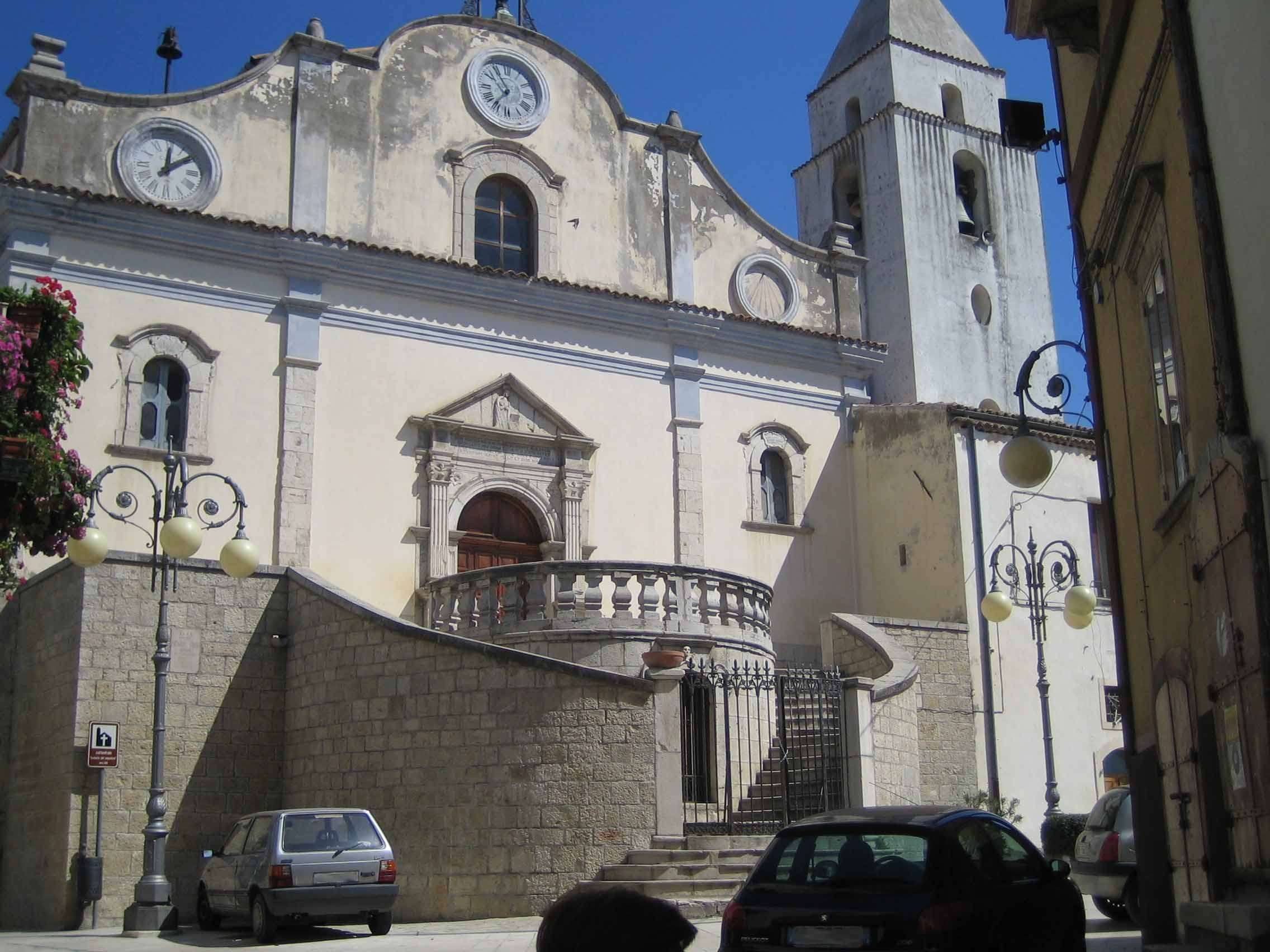
Facade before restoration

- The church of Santa Maria del Sepulcro is church in Ripacandida. Previously, the site had housed a church dedicated to Saint Catherine of Alexandria. A new church was built to consolidate two parishes, and consecrated in 1540 by Monsignor Aquaviva, bishop of Melfi. The church was completed in 1602 by Abbot Lorenzo Leonibus. The exterior facade is accessed by a marble staircase; it has a Renaissance portal and three clocks: two mechanical and one a sundial. The typmpanum has a Madonna of the Sepulchre. The name was called Sepulcro to commemorate thirteen barons who died in Palestine in Third Crusade in William the Good.

The interior has a chapel of the sacrament by Giovanni Battista Rossi, who also completed the polychrome marble balustrade of the presbytery. In four columns of the balustrades are bas- reliefs of the Passion of Christ. The sacristy houses a "Pietà" by Christian Danone and a "St. Bartholomew" by Gaetano Recco.

- The church of San Giuseppe was part of a cloistered nunnery founded in 1735 by Giovanni and Giovanni Battista Rossi. The church, which dates to 1173, presents a facade of terracotta bricks, with a baroque portal. The main altarpiece depicts a Madonna and Child with Saints Teresa and Joseph by a follower of Francesco Solimena. The interior has a baroque decoration. In the sacristy is the tomb of the mystic Sister Maria Araneo (died circa 1790), granddaughter of Giovanni Rossi and prioress of the monastery. Legend holds that her body was found, in a miraculous state of preservation, earthquake 1980. A year later, in 1751, this church was the site of a miracle by St. Gerard Majella (record of the event is preserved at the Sanctuary of Materdomini in Nocera Superiore.
- The church of San Antonio was built at the site of an ancient tower. It was severely damaged by the earthquake of 1980.
- The church of Santa Maria del Carmine is located near the entrance of the old cemetery (now a public garden) is presumed to have been built before the earthquake of 1694. Reconstructed with this title archpriest Baffari (uncle of the Blessed GB Rossi), however, clear from the baronial family coat of arms placed on the entrance door. It presents a unique decoration, made in the first half of the eighteenth century. Recent renovations have restored to its original splendor frescoes depicting the Holy Trinity, Our Lady of Mount Carmel and rosettes with the Saints, and Bishop Donald Donato (San Donato by Ripacandida). At the side of the seventeenth-century sculpture of the Madonna del Carmine

==== San Donato Sanctuary ====
At the entrance from the northeast up area there is the ancient shrine of San Donato by Ripacandida, patron of the town, with its paintings of 1500 and its millennial history. The adjacent "villa", the churchyard behind the millennial center of pilgrimage, contains meticulously cultivated trees that derive from the 16th century or earlier. The local feast of Saint Donatus (5–7 August) is one of the oldest and most beautiful festivals of saints of the Basilicata, showing still remnants of authentic old folk customs. The shrine, one of the most famous of Basilicata, is affiliated with the church of San Francesco in Assisi and received the gift of a relic of the patron saint of Italy. In December 2010, the sanctuary gets from 'UNESCO recognition of Monumento a messenger of peace culture to the profound spiritual values that for centuries forward.

== Naturalistic ==
=== The Forest ===
One of the natural beauty of the wood is Ripacandida, though little appreciated. Called the Great Forest, perhaps because it was originally more of a big region. One of the few residues of the immense forests that covered the Lucania (for Latin lucus = wood), now much reduced as a result of uncontrolled cuts. Composed of tall trees such as oaks, cedars, etc.. For centuries it has employed, fed and warm during the cold winters of the population Ripacandida and neighboring countries. The peasants, including women fearless and courageous, they went to the woods to cut and then sell what was called a "body" of wood. Uploaded on mules, was brought to sell in neighboring countries. Refuge and breeding herds, during the so-called "transhumance", which used the forest as a resting place for their long journeys. Also has a construction called "mansions" and "pile" that is, drinking troughs for animals. During the robbery, was a refuge for the robbers, who used the many caves to avoid capture.

=== La Pineta ===
The pine forest was planted in the late fifties at the base and on the slopes of the hill on which stands Ripacandida. Despite repeated fires, the forest was resilient in some areas, where it grew back to the base and side Rionero. Since 2006, (i.e. since the Fonti del Vulture were bought by a multinational company), we see in the spot of 'Water Lily where it makes a show.

== Traditions ==
=== The game of Morra ===
One of the favorite pastimes in Ripacandida, especially by men, was the game of Morra. During the long winter evenings but also to distract them from the drudgery of the fields two or more people are delighted to "guess the sum of the fingers shown in the game for two players." The winner was a good shot of "Aglianico". The first news of the game of Morra date back to ancient Egypt, but probably were the Roman soldiers to spread in Italy, because it was very common in ancient Rome. The success of the game is because it only requires the use of hands, a game so that you can play everywhere, poor but not simple, requiring skill and intelligence. The player must think in fractions of a second in two ways: to predict the opponent's game and never play the numbers that you expect your opponent. In recent years, associations have been created at national level who seek to take up the slack. Today, the Morra has become a rarely practiced custom.

=== Easter Bread ===
The characteristic shape braided bread traditionally prepared for the Passover is called "rucilatieggh". Do not know the origin of the custom of the Easter bread, unique among other things, because neighboring countries does not exist. Prepared by the good housewife, was then baked in the houses, each house had its oven. "I rucilatieggh" were prepared from a dough of flour, oil, water, fennel seeds, eggs, salt and baking powder and then polished with egg yolk. The tradition continues in the bakery who prepare for Tuesday and Friday.

=== The cupboard ===
Traditionally every house had Ripacandida the oven for baking bread, which had a high form of bread similar to matter. The bread was baked once placed in the cupboard, which was also used for mixing, 'lu'mpasta'pan'. In every kitchen there was this piece of furniture that was in the form of a box: two doors, two drawers and upper compartment with hinged lid flare. After the fifties, retired skilled tradesmen all the antique furniture in exchange for plastic containers. To the cry of 'mobil'viecch' reaping what to ripacandidesi no longer needed, then restore them and sell them at high prices.

== Famous people from Ripacandida or people whose family immigrated from Ripacandida ==
- San Mariano (Grumentum 303), deacon and martyr of the Catholic Church.
- San Laviero (Grumentum 27 November 312), martyr of the Catholic Church.
- San Donatello also known as Donatus of Ripacandida (1179–1198), Monaco of Montevergine.
- Antonio Calandra (1541–1661), all physical doctor University of Rome and Paris.
- Gerardo Martino (1962), former footballer and football coach.
- Andrea Molfese (1573–1620) theologian Theatine author of "Summa Theologica" and "Commentary on the Neapolitan traditions."
- Giambattista Baffari (1636–1702) Dean author of "The Hunt comedy" edited by prof. Mario Pieri-Institute of Modern Philology at Pisa University.
- Maria Teresa Araneo also known as Sister Mary of Jesus' (1725–1803), servant of God, Prioress of the Carmelite monastery Ripacandida.
- Luigi Guglielmucci (?), Poet, author of the jurist "Garden of Love."
- Giambattista Rossi (1690–1746), theologian and venerable of the Catholic Church.
- Leopoldo Chiari (1790–1849), obstetric surgeon precursor of modern medicine said "Prince of Surgery" to 'University of Naples.
- Nino Chiari (1924–1959), poet fourth prize in the Competition III poetic "The Literature", the author of "Around the Mountain", ed. Pellegrini, 1956.
- Carlo Bisaccia (1925–2006), historical writer and author of the book The Story of Ripacandida
- Tony Musto (1915–1994), an Italian-American heavyweight boxer
- William Phillips (1948), physicist, Nobel Prize for physics in 1997.
- Gary Sinise, an award-winning American actor, director, and musician.

== Events ==
Festivities

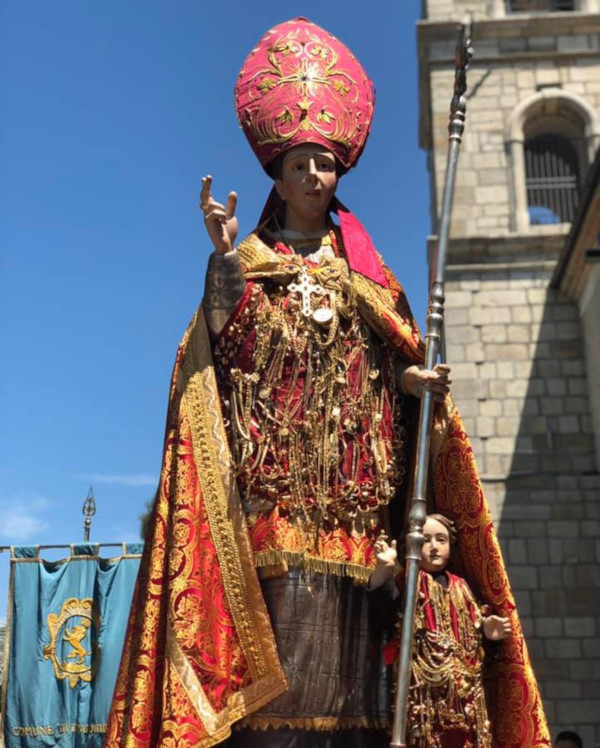
Statue of San Donato, patron saint of Ripacandida

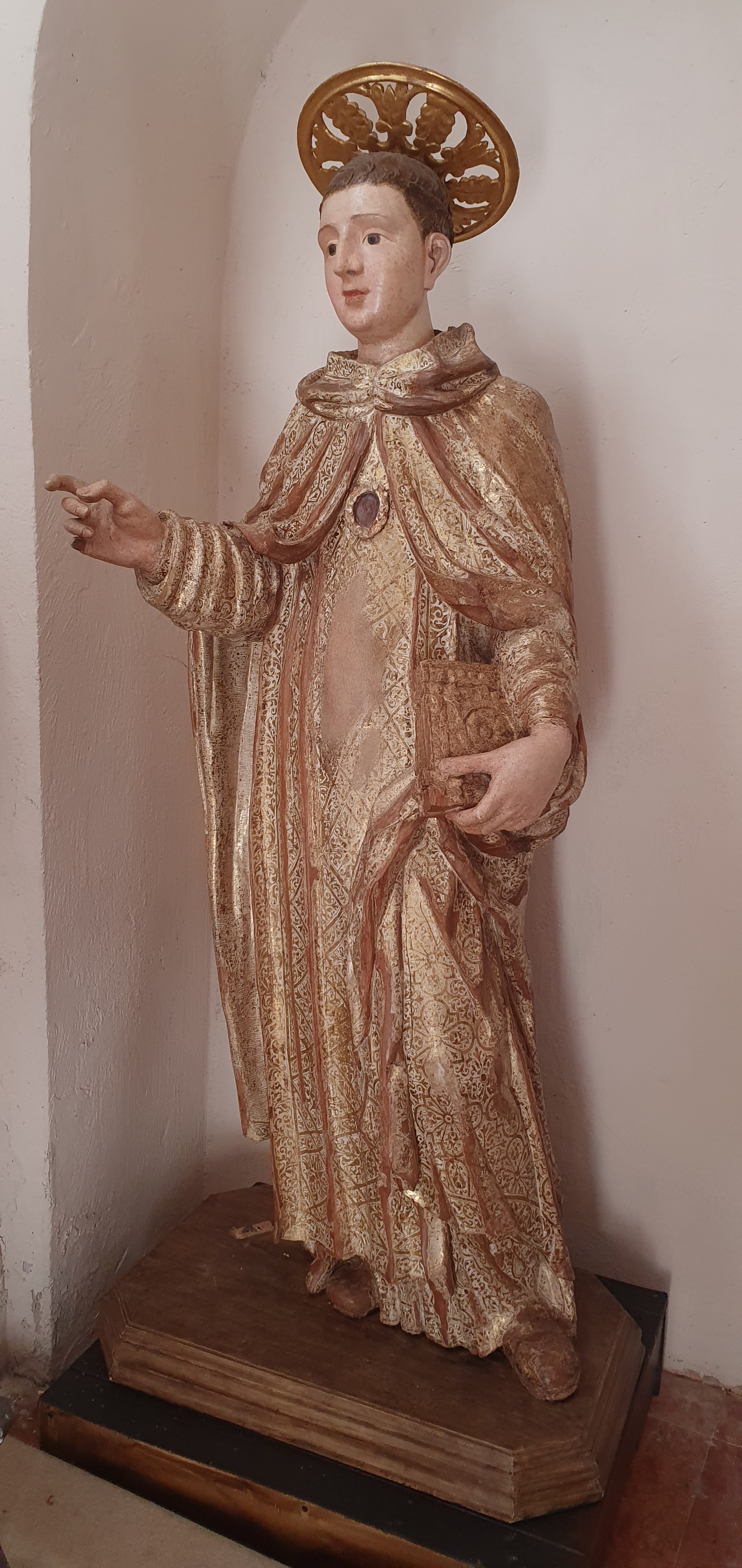
Statue of San Donato, patron saint of Ripacandida

Festivities in honor of saints:

- 29–30 April; festival in honor of San Mariano
- 7 September; festival in honor of Our Lady of Mount Carmel
- 5–7 August; festival in honor of San Donato of Arezzo
- 16 August; festival in honor of San Rocco
- 17 August; festival in honor of San Donato of Ripacandida

== Demographic evolution ==
Template:Demografia/Ripacandida

== Government ==
Mayor Vito Antonio Remollino from 2013

== Twin towns ==
- (Italy) Anzi, since 19 December 2008
- (Italy) Auletta, since 9 August 1966, reconfirmed 9 August 2009
- (United States) Blue Island, since 12 August 2006
- (Italy) Caposele, since 2002
- (Italy) Contursi Terme, since 10 March 1990
- (Italy) Muro Lucano, since 2002

In addition, Ripacandida has signed a friendship agreement with:

- (Italy) Assisi, on 28 September 2008
