= Aglianico del Vulture =

DOC wine from Potenza, Basilicata, Italy

- Wine region
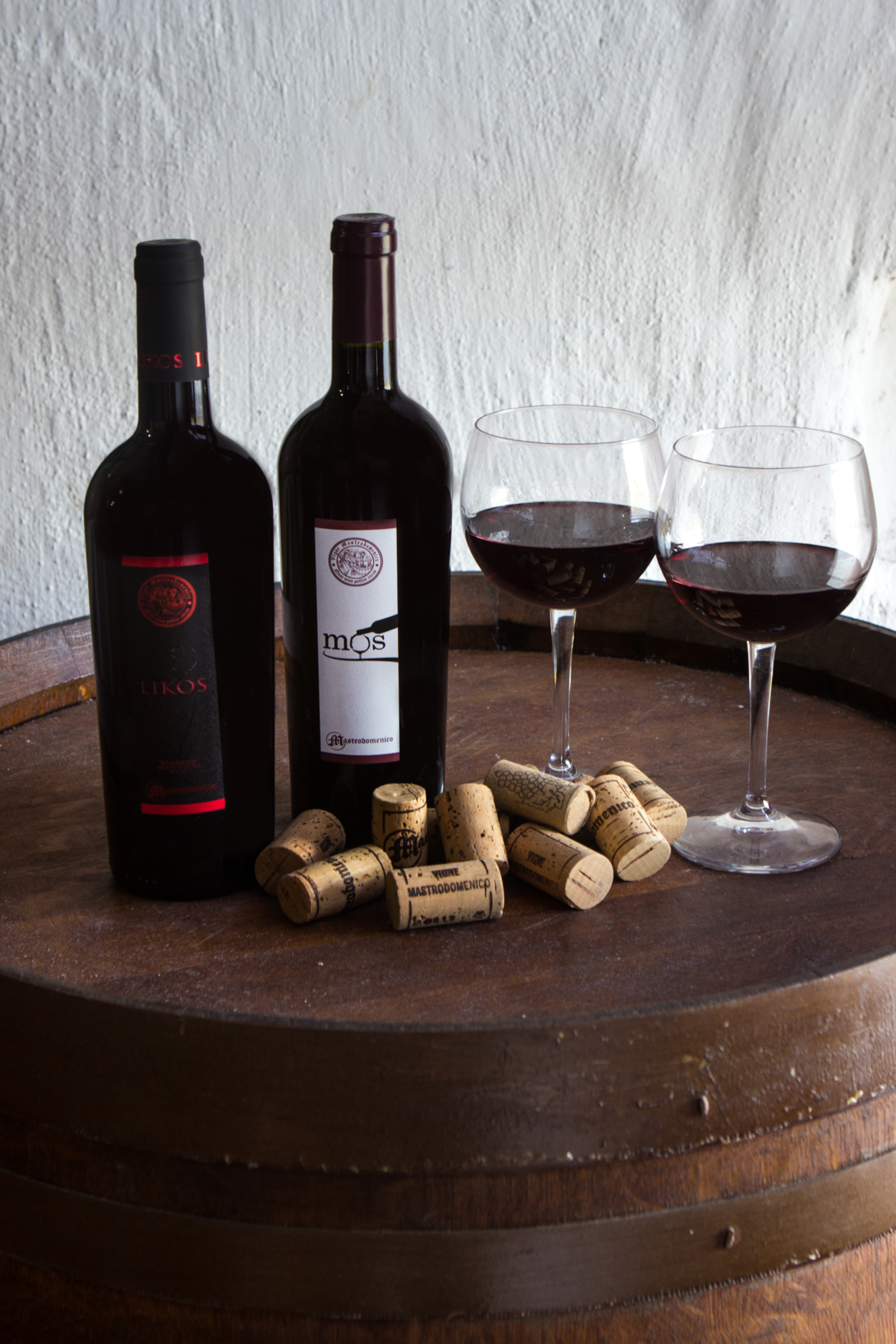
- Bottles of Aglianico del Vulture
- Type: DOC
- Year established: 1971
- Country: Italy
- Part of: Basilicata
- Size of planted vineyards: 375 hectares (930 acres)
- Varietals produced: Aglianico
- Wine produced: 22,200 hl
- Comments: Aglianico del Vulture Superiore is a separate DOCG

Aglianico del Vulture and Aglianico del Vulture Superiore are Italian red wines based on the Aglianico grape and produced in the Vulture area of Basilicata. Located on volcanic soils derived from nearby Mount Vulture, it was awarded Denominazione di Origine Controllata (DOC) status in 1971. The Superiore was elevated to a separate Denominazione di Origine Controllata e Garantita (DOCG) status in 2011, the only DOCG wine in Basilicata.

Although not as famous as other Italian wines, Aglianico del Vulture is considered one of the best red wines of Italy.

== History ==
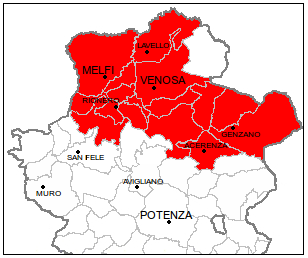
Aglianico del Vulture wine area.

Like all the Aglianico grape varieties, Aglianico del Vulture has ancient origins, and it is believed to have been introduced by the Greeks in southern Italy in the 7th or 6th century BC. Remains of a wine press of the Roman age have been found in the area of Rionero in Vulture, as well as a bronze coin depicting the deity of Dionysus. Some of the literary references about the history of Aglianico del Vulture have been left by Horace, the Roman poet born in Venosa who celebrated the beauty of his native land and the quality of the wine.

At least one source says that after defeating the Romans in 212 BC, Hannibal sent his soldiers to Lucania to heal themselves with the wines of the Vulture.

Under the Swabian empire, Frederick II promoted the cultivation of the vineyard. In 1280 Charles of Anjou ordered the giustiziere of Basilicata the supply of 400 salme (equal to 185 liters) of "vino rubeo Melfie" (red wine of Melfi) when planning a summer stay at Castel Lagopesole with the Angevin court. The wines of the Vulture, appreciated by the Swabian and Angevin sovereigns, were also requested by the Florentine merchants of the time.

Subsequently, there was a notable increase in viticulture, also linked to the new uses of wine in the celebration of mass and in medicine. In the 15th century, vineyards covered the slopes of Mount Vulture between Melfi, Rapolla, and Barile. Wine cellars were often excavated in caves there, and today many prominent wineries retain cellars in the old caves.

In 1906, Aglianico del Vulture was presented at the Milan International. Pierre Viala and Victor Vermorel cited the wine in the Ampélographie. Traité général de viticulture.

In 2012, Poste Italiane has dedicated a stamp to it, along with other wines of fifteen regions of Italy.

== Viticulture ==
Most of the vineyards are located on higher altitudes in the region, typically between 450 and 600 meters. The Aglianico grape ripens late and is often one of the last non-dessert wine grapes to be harvested in Italy being picked from late October to early November. When yields are kept low, the grape will produce intensely flavored wines.

== Winemaking ==
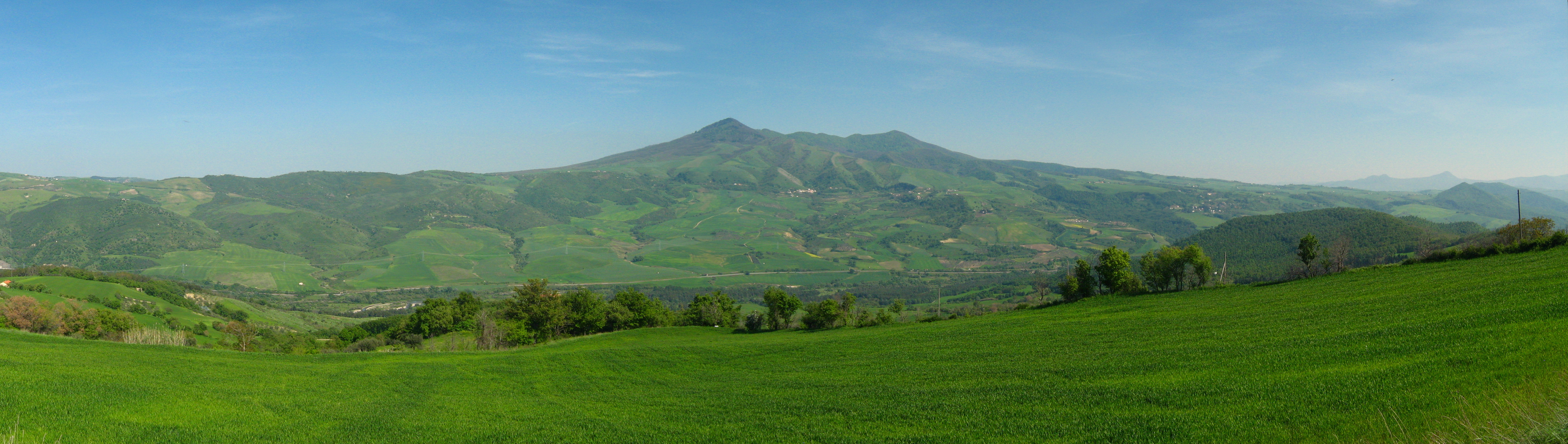
Mount Vulture

In recent years, there has been movement towards the use of new French oak barrels for aging the wine instead of large chestnut casks. The Superiore wine must have 13.5% minimum alcohol level and have been aged for at least three years, with wines labeled riserva being aged for at least five years, two of which must be in wood.

== Wines ==
Aglianico del Vulture wines have the potential to be full-bodied, richly textured with a firm tannic structure and chocolate-cherry notes. In their youth, the wines can be more rustic and harsh, but they can develop soft tannins and more silky texture as they age, having the potential to improve in the bottle for 6 to 20 years.

== Wine regions ==
Aglianico del Vulture can be produced only in the following communes: Rionero in Vulture, Barile, Rapolla, Ripacandida, Ginestra, Maschito, Forenza, Acerenza, Melfi, Atella, Venosa, Lavello, Palazzo San Gervasio, Banzi, Genzano di Lucania.
