= Monticchio =

- Frazione
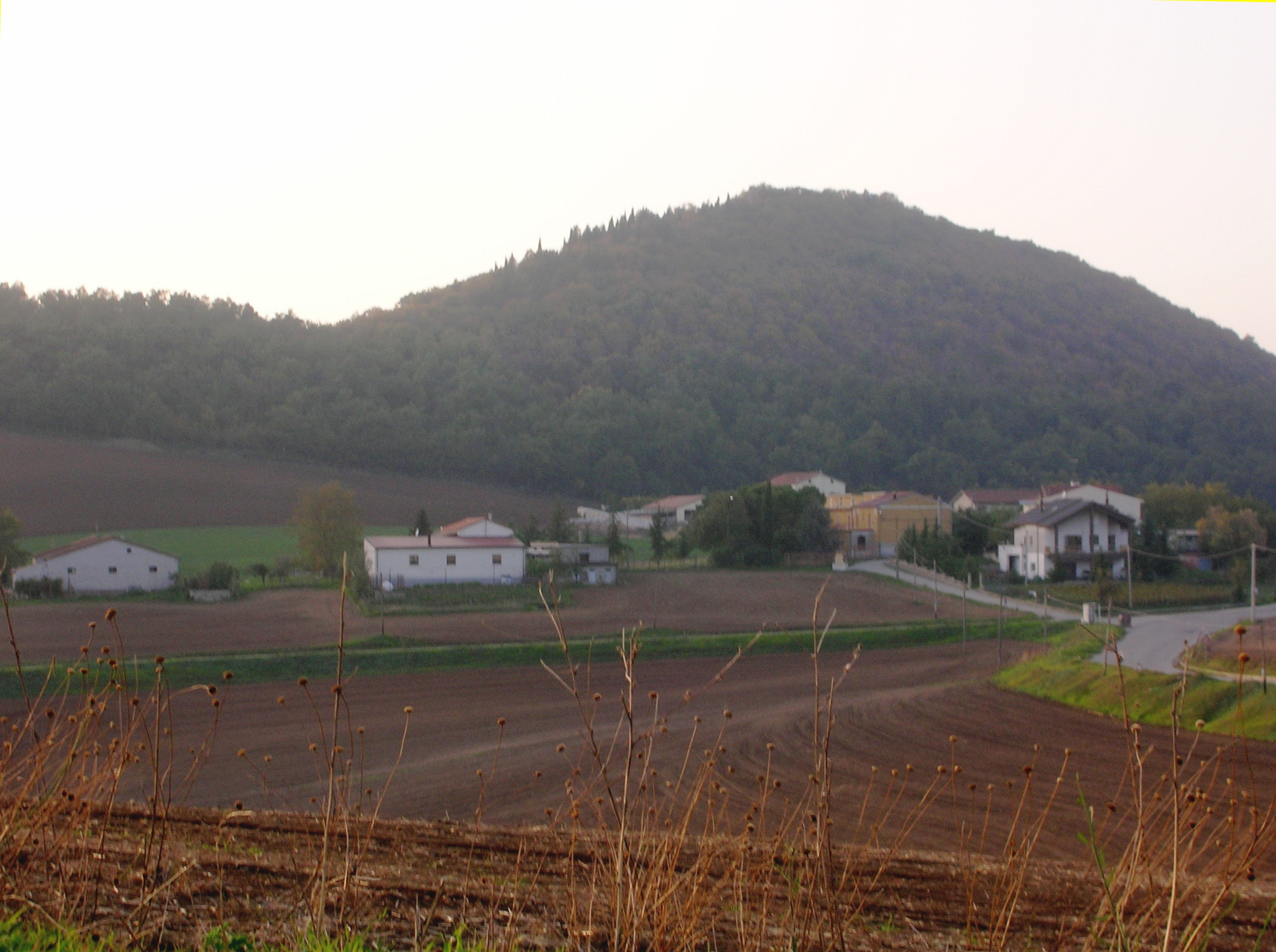
- View of Monticchio Sgarroni

- Location of Monticchio in Italy
- Coordinates: 40°57′00″N 15°35′00″E
- Country: Italy
- Region: Basilicata
- Province: Potenza
- Comune: Atella; Rionero in Vulture
- Elevation: 600 m (2,000 ft)

Population (2010)
  - Total: 400
- Demonym: monticchiesi
- Time zone: UTC+1 (CET)
  - Summer (DST): UTC+2 (CEST)
- Postal code: 85028
- Dialing code: 0972

Monticchio is an Italian hamlet (frazione) belonging to the municipalities of Rionero in Vulture and Atella, in the Province of Potenza, Basilicata. The village is divided into three zones: Monticchio Laghi (part of Atella), Monticchio Bagni and Monticchio Sgarroni (both in Rionero).

== History ==
First inhabited by the Normans, who occupied the ancient castle near Sgarroni (Castrum Monticuli), it became, in the second half of the 19th century, a strategic point for brigands after Italian unification. It was the shelter for brigands such as Carmine Crocco and his subordinates Ninco Nanco (Giuseppe Summa), Giuseppe Caruso, Teodoro Gioseffi and Giovanni Fortunato. Nowadays it is a touristic place admired for its natural environment and for mineral waters, due to the presence of some extinct volcanoes.

== Geography ==
Monticchio is part of the Vulture region and lies near the borders with the Province of Avellino, Campania. The three tiny villages composing it are located to the west of Mount Vulture and few kilometres away from each other. A regional road links Monticchio Bagni and Monticchio Laghi.

- Monticchio Bagni (M. Baths, 40°56′57.23″N 15°34′7.08″E) is the northernmost locality, situated few kilometres from the borders with Campania and from the closed railway station on the Avellino-Lioni-Rocchetta line. With a population of about 250, it is the most populated locality.
- Monticchio Laghi (M. Lakes, 40°56′6.83″N 15°36′31.08″E) lies on the slopes of Mount Vulture and counts about 150 inhabitants. In front of it there are situated two little volcanic lakes and the locality is receptive for tourism. From 1971 the smaller of the two lakes, habitat of the European owl moth, constitutes a natural reserve, named Riserva regionale Lago piccolo di Monticchio. Around the village are situated two abbeys: St. Michael and the ruins of St. Hippolytus.
- Monticchio Sgarroni (40°55′6.75″N 15°34′16.8″E), with a population of about 50, is the least populated one. Also known as Sgarroni, close to it are located the ruins of a castle.

Monticchio is 13 kilometres from Melfi, 16 kilometres from Rionero in Vulture, 22 from Atella, 68 from Potenza, 71 from Foggia and 123 from Avellino.

Distances between the three zones	M. Bagni	M. Laghi	M. Sgarroni
Monticchio Bagni	•	6.0 km	5.5 km
Monticchio Laghi	6.0 km	•	5.6 km
Monticchio Sgarroni	5.5 km	5.6 km	•

== Economy ==
The economy of Monticchio is mainly based on tourism and agriculture. Local industry is based on the export of the mineral waters, owned by the Italian companies Gaudianello (based in Melfi) and Fonti del Vulture (based in Rionero). This second company has a local factory that produces the waters Toka, Solaria and Felicia.

== Gallery ==
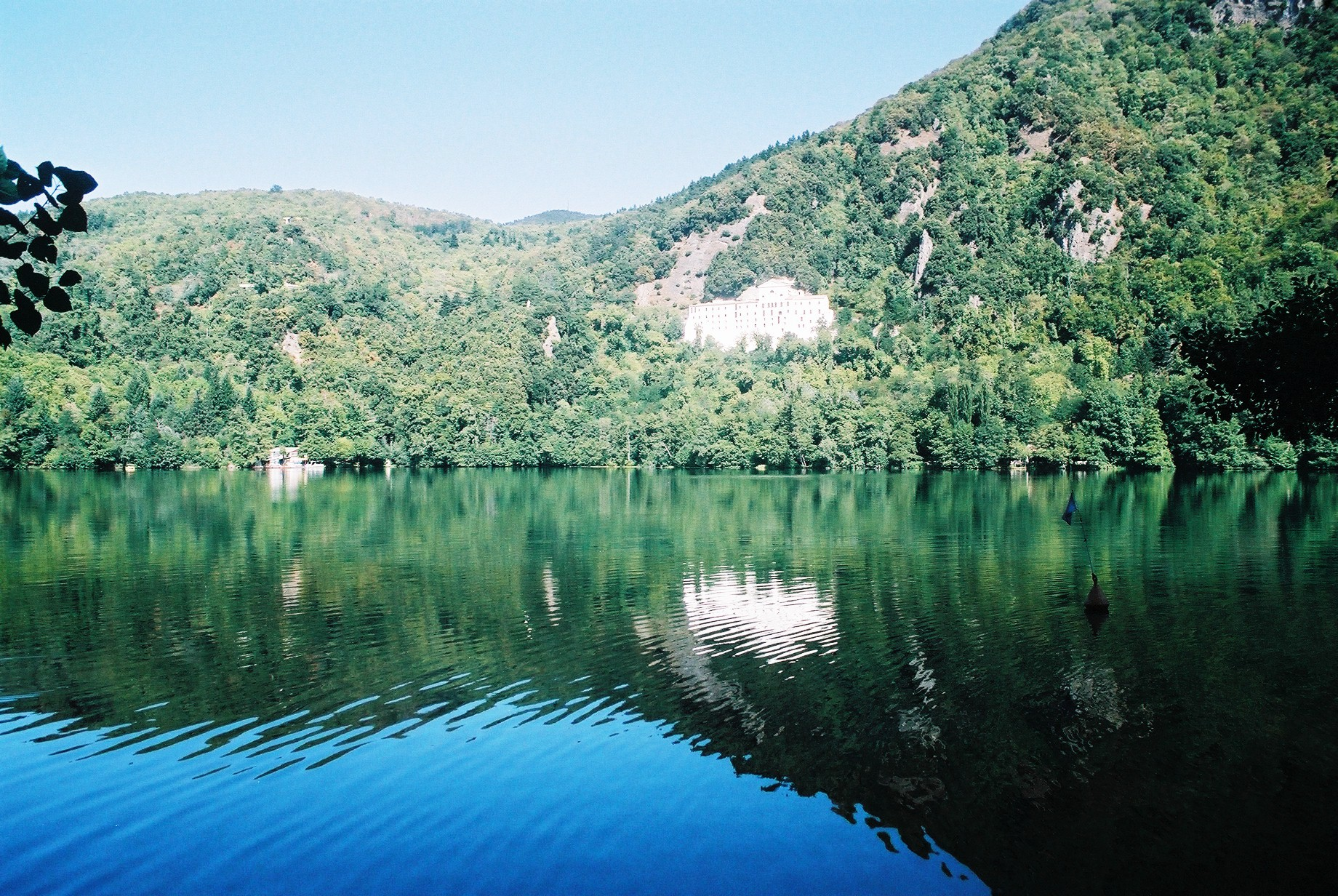
The lakes of Monticchio

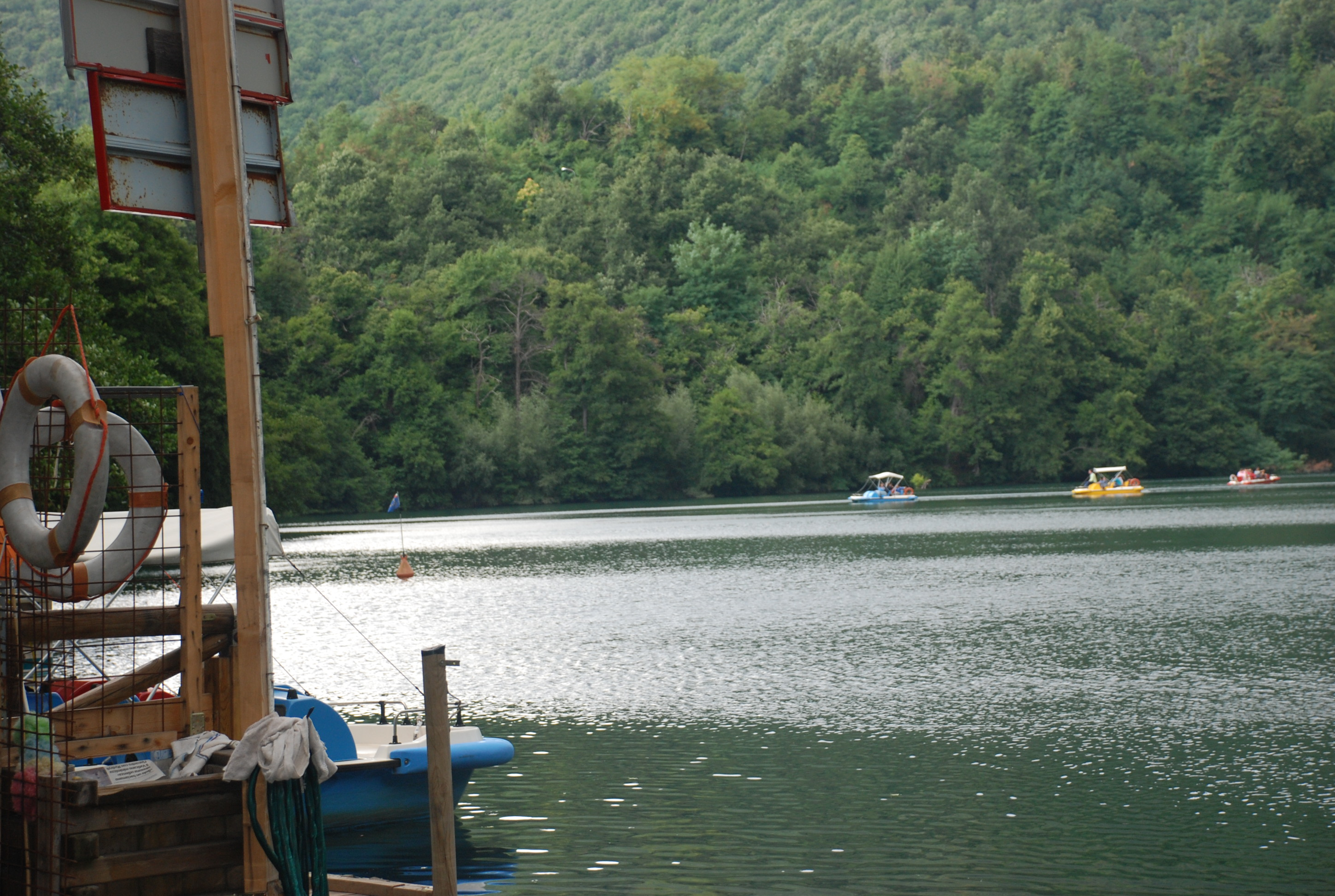
View of Monticchio Laghi

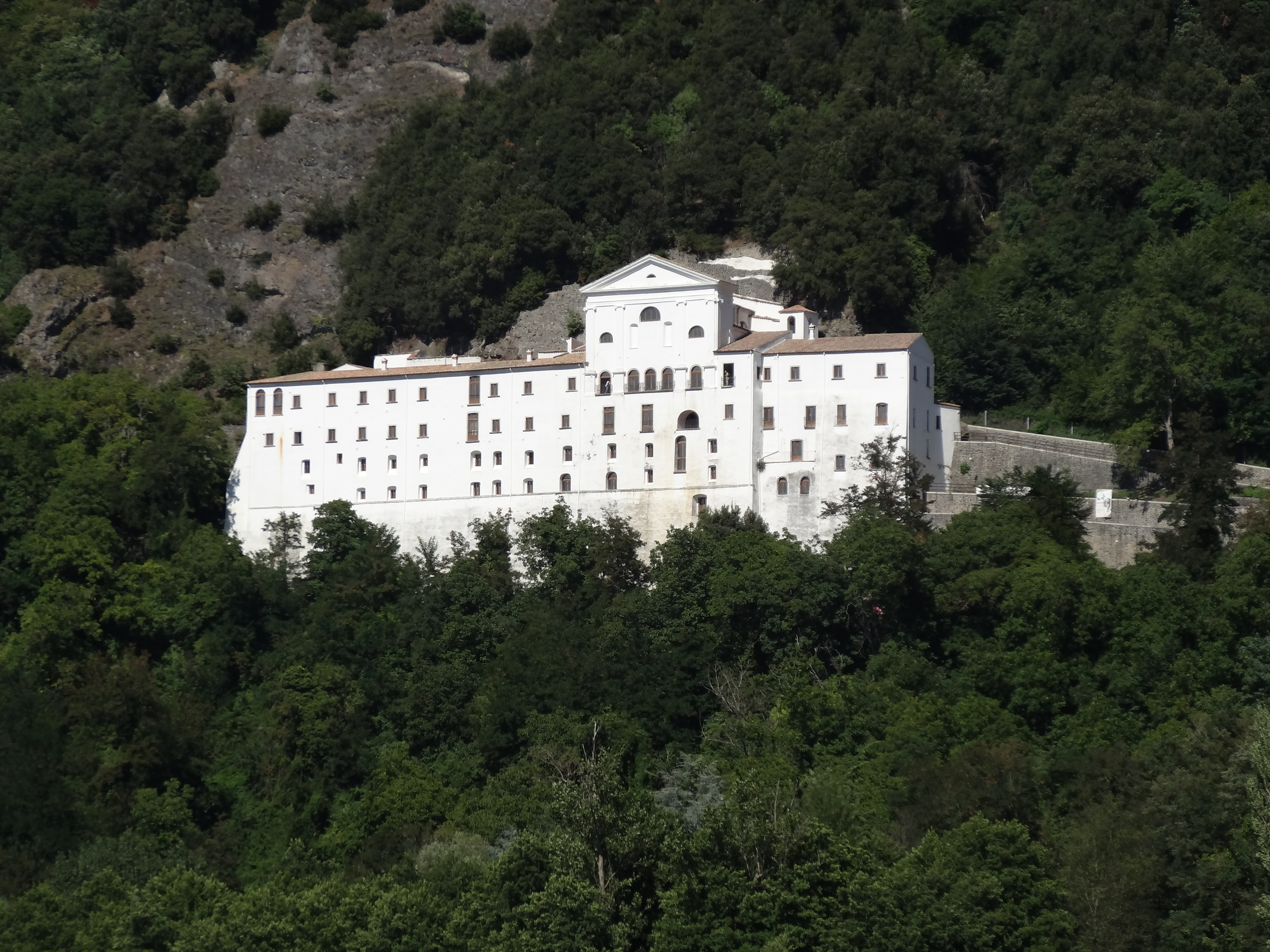
The abbey of St. Michael

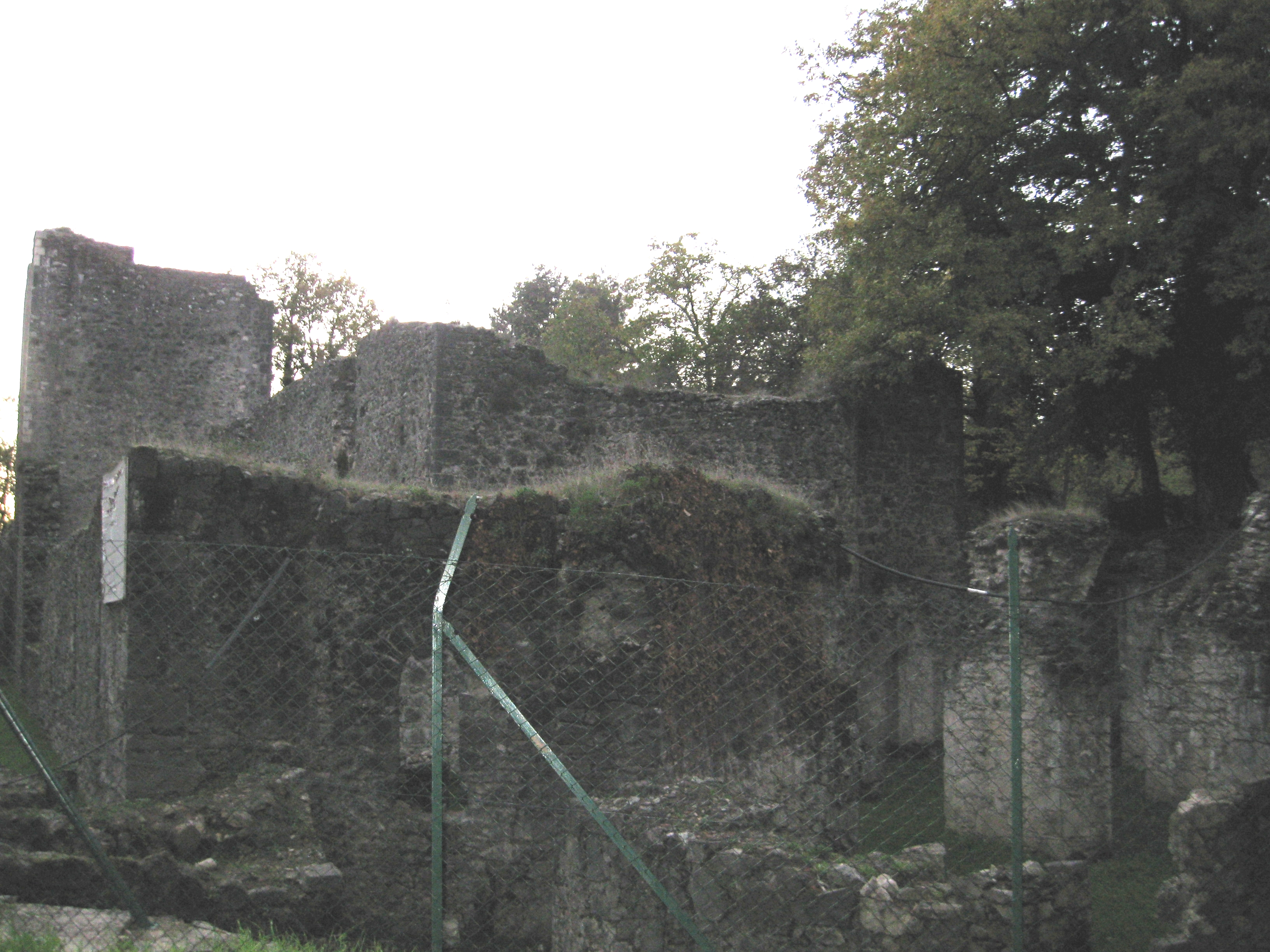
Ruins of the abbey of St. Hippolytus
