= Donatus of Ripacandida =

Italian Roman Catholic saint

Saint Donatus
- Born: 1179; Ripacandida, Italy
- Died: 1198
- Venerated in: Roman Catholic Church
- Feast: 17 August
- Patronage: Ripacandida, Italy

Donatus was a Benedictine monk. He was born in Ripacandida, Italy. He became a Benedictine in 1194, at Petina, Italy.
