= Melfi =

- Comune
- Comune di Melfi
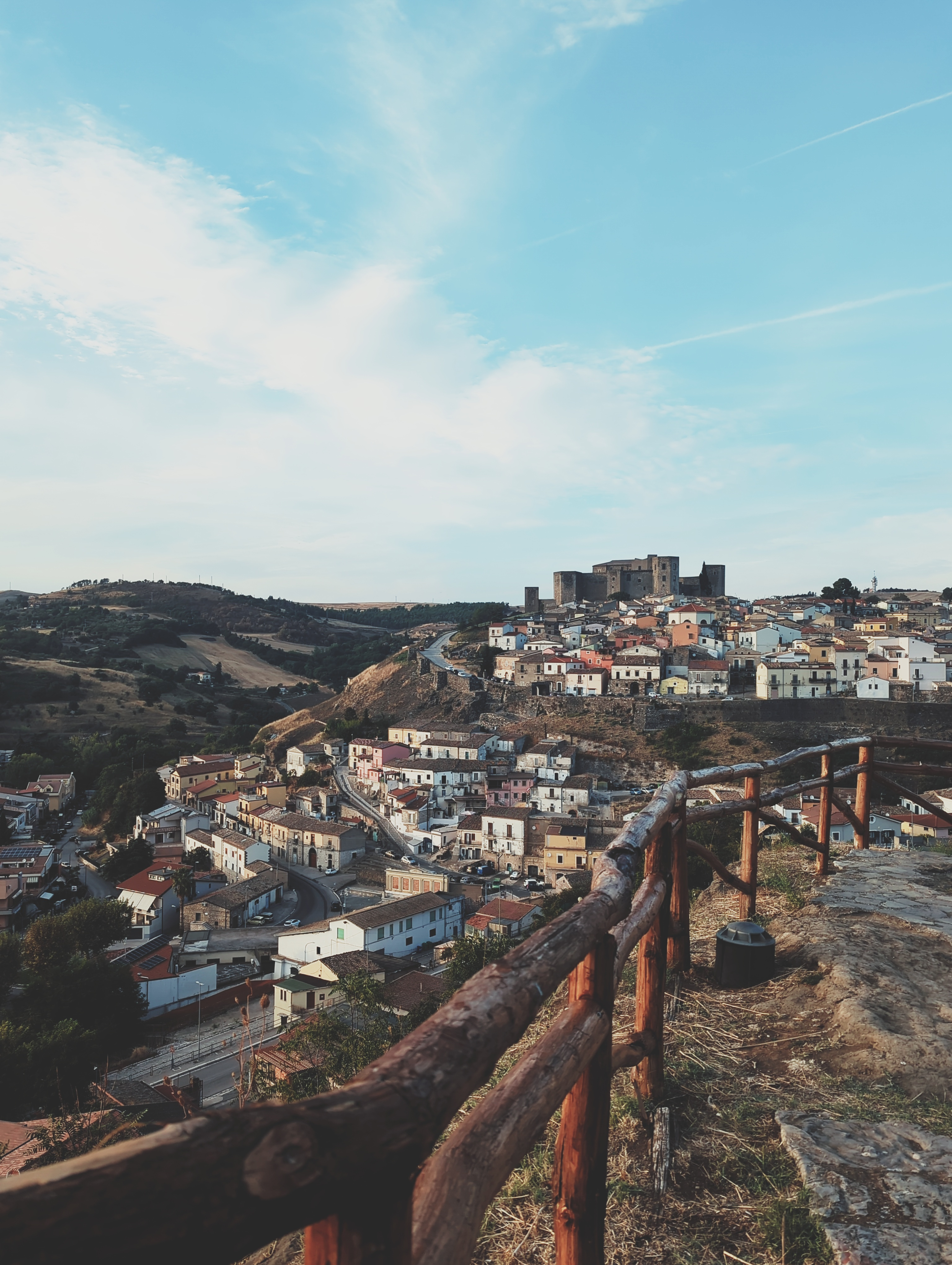
- View of Melfi

- Flag Coat of arms

- Melfi within the Province of Potenza

- Location of Melfi in Italy Melfi (Basilicata)
- Coordinates: 41°00′N 15°39′E
- Country: Italy
- Region: Basilicata
- Province: Potenza (PZ)
- Frazioni: Camarda, Capannola, Foggianello, Foggiano, Isca ricotta, Leonessa, Masseria Casella, Masseria Catapane, Masseria Menolecchia, Parasacco, San Giorgio di Melfi, San Nicola, Vaccareccia, Villa Mariannina

Government
  - Mayor: Giuseppe Maglione

Area
  - Total: 210 km^{2} (81 sq mi)
- Elevation: 532 m (1,745 ft)

Population (31 December 2017)
  - Total: 17,878
  - Density: 85/km^{2} (220/sq mi)
- Demonym: Melfitani
- Time zone: UTC+1 (CET)
  - Summer (DST): UTC+2 (CEST)
- Postal code: 85025
- Dialing code: 0972
- ISTAT code: 076048
- Patron saint: St. Alexander
- Saint day: February 9
- Website: Official website

Melfi (Lucano: Mèlfe) is a town and comune in the Vulture area of the province of Potenza, in the Southern Italian region of Basilicata. Geographically, it is midway between Naples and Bari. In 2015 it had a population of 17,768.

== Geography ==
On a hill at the foot of Mount Vulture, Melfi is the most important town in Basilicata's Vulture, both as a tourist resort and economic centre. Its municipality lies next to the borders with Campania and Apulia, and borders with Aquilonia (AV), Ascoli Satriano (FG), Candela (FG), Lacedonia (AV), Lavello, Monteverde (AV), Rapolla, Rionero in Vulture and Rocchetta Sant'Antonio (FG). Its hamlets (frazioni) are the villages of Camarda, Capannola, Foggianello, Foggiano, Isca ricotta, Leonessa, Masseria Casella, Masseria Catapane, Masseria Menolecchia, Parasacco, San Giorgio di Melfi, San Nicola, Vaccareccia and Villa Mariannina.

== History ==
=== Early history and Middle Ages ===
Inhabited by the Daunians and Lucanians, under the Romans, Melfi was included in the area of the colony of Venusia, founded in 291 BC. After the fall of Western Roman Empire, Melfi gained importance in the Middle Ages as a strategic point between areas controlled by the Byzantines and those controlled by the Lombards.

Melfi was captured several times by the struggling powers of the region, until it was assigned to the Norman leader William I of Hauteville. The Hauteville family started from here their conquest of southern Italy, which, in the early 12th century, led to the creation of the Kingdom of Sicily.

In 1059 Melfi became the capital of the Duchy of Apulia. Papal councils were held in the city in the same year, in 1089, and in 1109. In 1231, Emperor Frederick II proclaimed the Constitutions of Melfi (or Constitutiones Augustales) here, reinforcing control over his ever-expanding territory. He created a bureaucracy of paid officials, who among other things imposed a tax system on the local feudal rulers, who resented it but could not resist.

Later, the town shared the fate of the entire Kingdom of Naples, falling into a long period of decline. Under the Angevin crown, Charles II ordered the castle to be renovated and enlarged, making it the official residence of his wife Mary of Hungary.

=== Modern history ===
During the war between Francis I of France and Charles V of Spain for the Kingdom of Naples, the French army headed by Odet de Foix besieged Melfi in March 1528, slaying about 3.000 people, without sparing women or children.

Beating the French occupation, Charles V gave to Andrea Doria the title of Prince of Melfi, for having successfully fought for his cause. His family held the city until the end of the feudal system and maintained properties and estates until the agrarian reform in the middle of the 20th century.

During the Parthenopean Republic, proclaimed in 1799, Melfi was controlled by the republicans until the arrival of the sanfedisti headed by the cardinal Fabrizio Ruffo on May 29 of the same year. Unlike other centers, Ruffo was able to prevent the sack of Melfi, although many revolutionaries died in prisons, probably due to diseases or abuses.

After the Italian unification, Melfi was involved in a bloody civil war labeled as brigandage and was occupied by the peasant army of Carmine Crocco on April 15, 1861; in order to restore the Bourbon government of Francis II in the Vulture area.

=== 20th and 21st centuries ===
During the Fascist regime, it was land of exile for antifascists such as Manlio Rossi-Doria, Franco Venturi, Eugenio Colorni and his wife Ursula Hirschmann. Melfi was devastated by the 1930 Irpinia earthquake and, during the Second World War, suffered a bombardment by the Allied Forces on September 26, 1943.

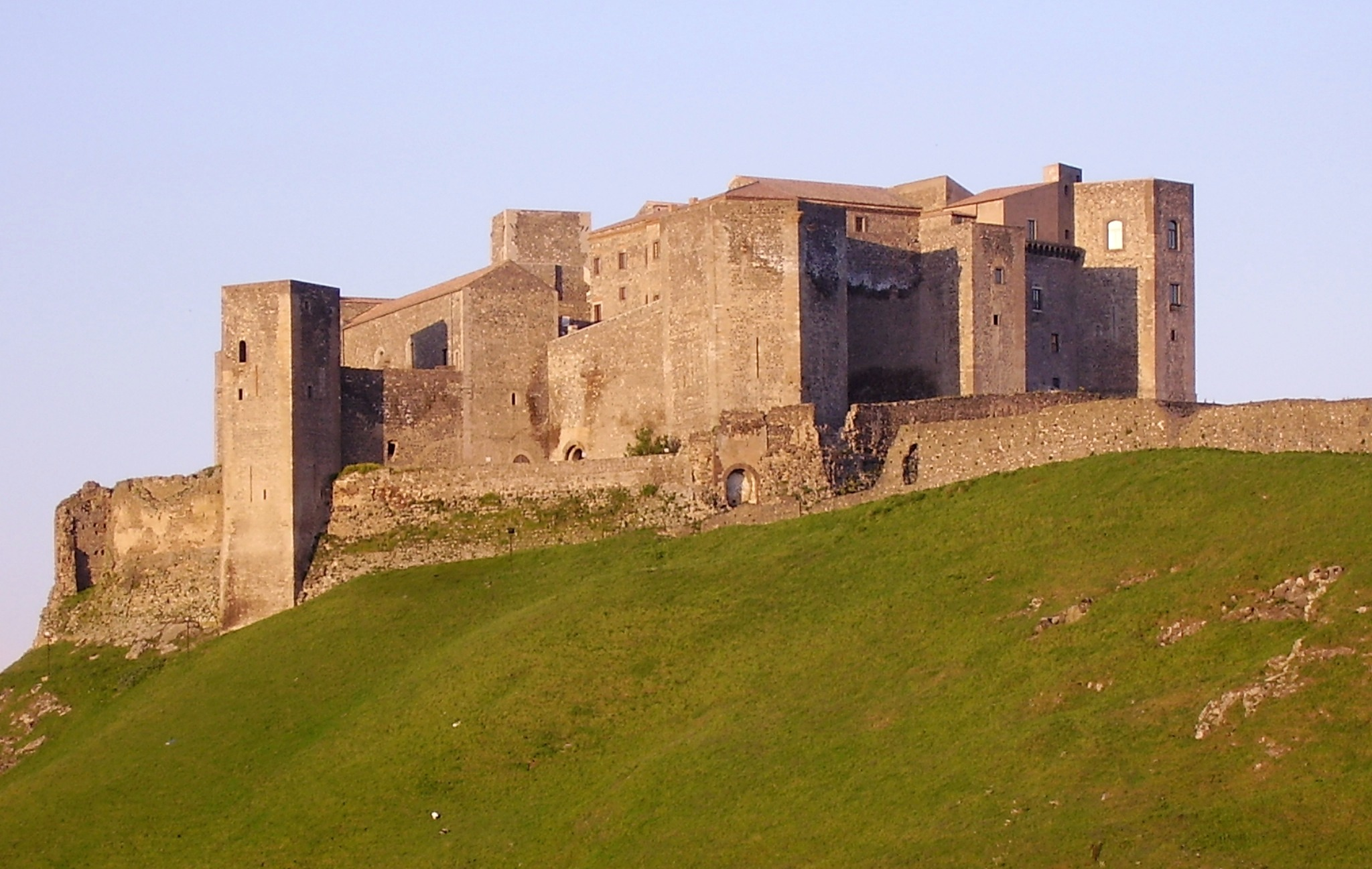
The castle.

Melfi was candidated as a capital of an autonomous province for several times. The first proposal dates back to 1866 and many were advanced over the years; the last one was made in 2006 by senators Guido Viceconte and Vincenzo Taddei.

The city enjoyed a revival of sorts from the end of the 20th century, and recently has gained additional prosperity when the Italian auto firm FIAT built a factory here.

Stellantis builds its Jeep Compass electric vehicle here, since Invitalia prompted it in July 2020.

== Main sights ==
=== Castle ===
The Castle of Melfi was probably constructed ex novo by the Normans (11th century), as no trace of pre-existing Byzantine or Lombard edifices has been found. Originally, it was probably a simple rectangle with square towers, with further towers defending the main gate. One of the main internal buildings was later (16th–18th centuries) turned into a baronial palace by enclosing the walls between the towers within new walls. Under the Angevine rule a new section was added on the slope descending to the Melfia stream, with several constructions rising at different altitudes. The Castle was chosen by King Charles II's wife, Mary of Hungary, as her residence. The Aragon kings gave it to the Caracciolo family, who rebuilt the side facing the city and dug a moat. Later it was a possession of the powerful House of Doria.

=== Cathedral ===
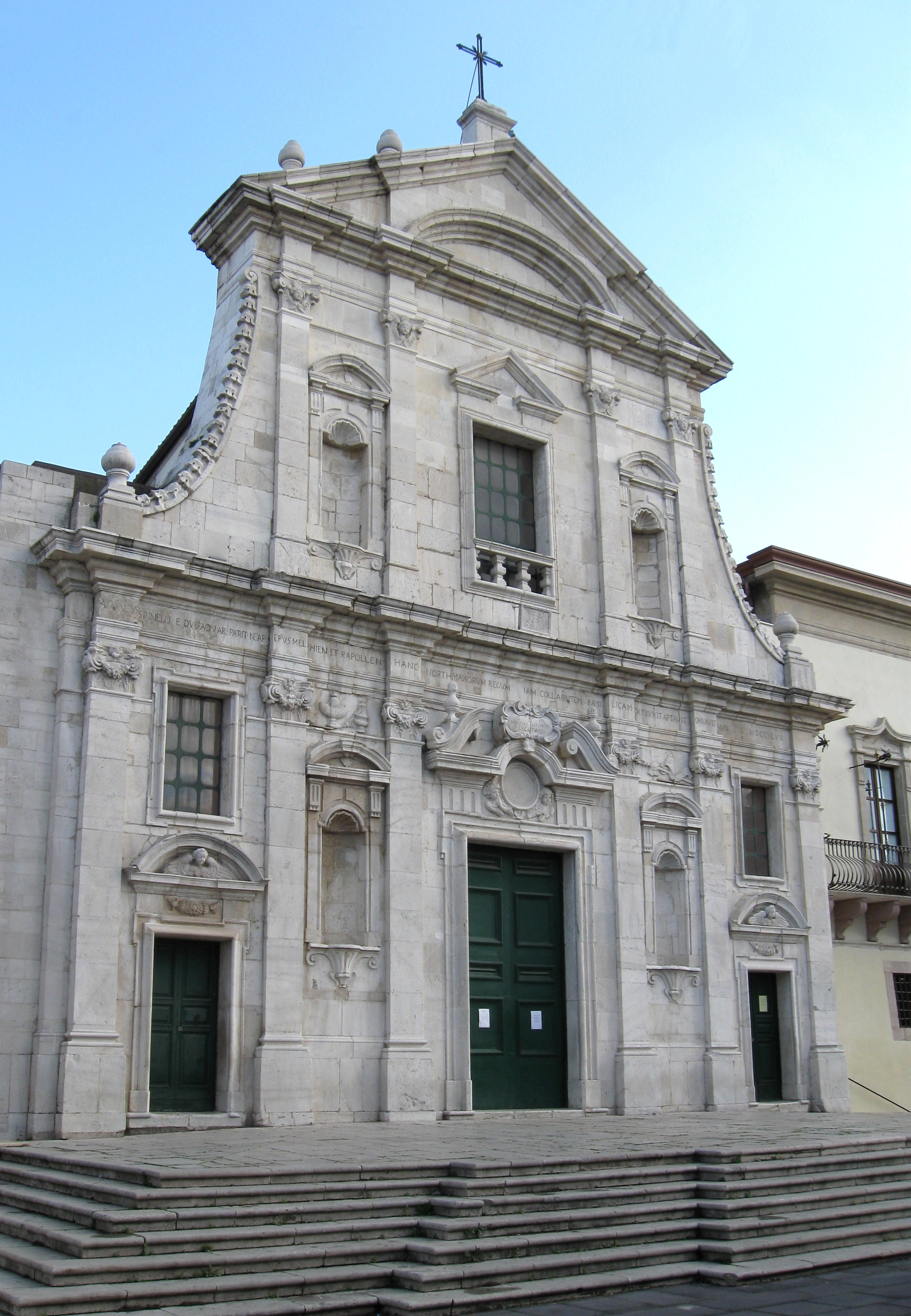
The Cathedral

The Duomo (Cathedral), built in the 11th century for want of Robert Guiscard, it was also rehandled in the baroque style after the earthquakes, with exception of the original Norman bell tower. The interior contains a magnificent 13th-century fresco, the Madonna with Child and Angels.

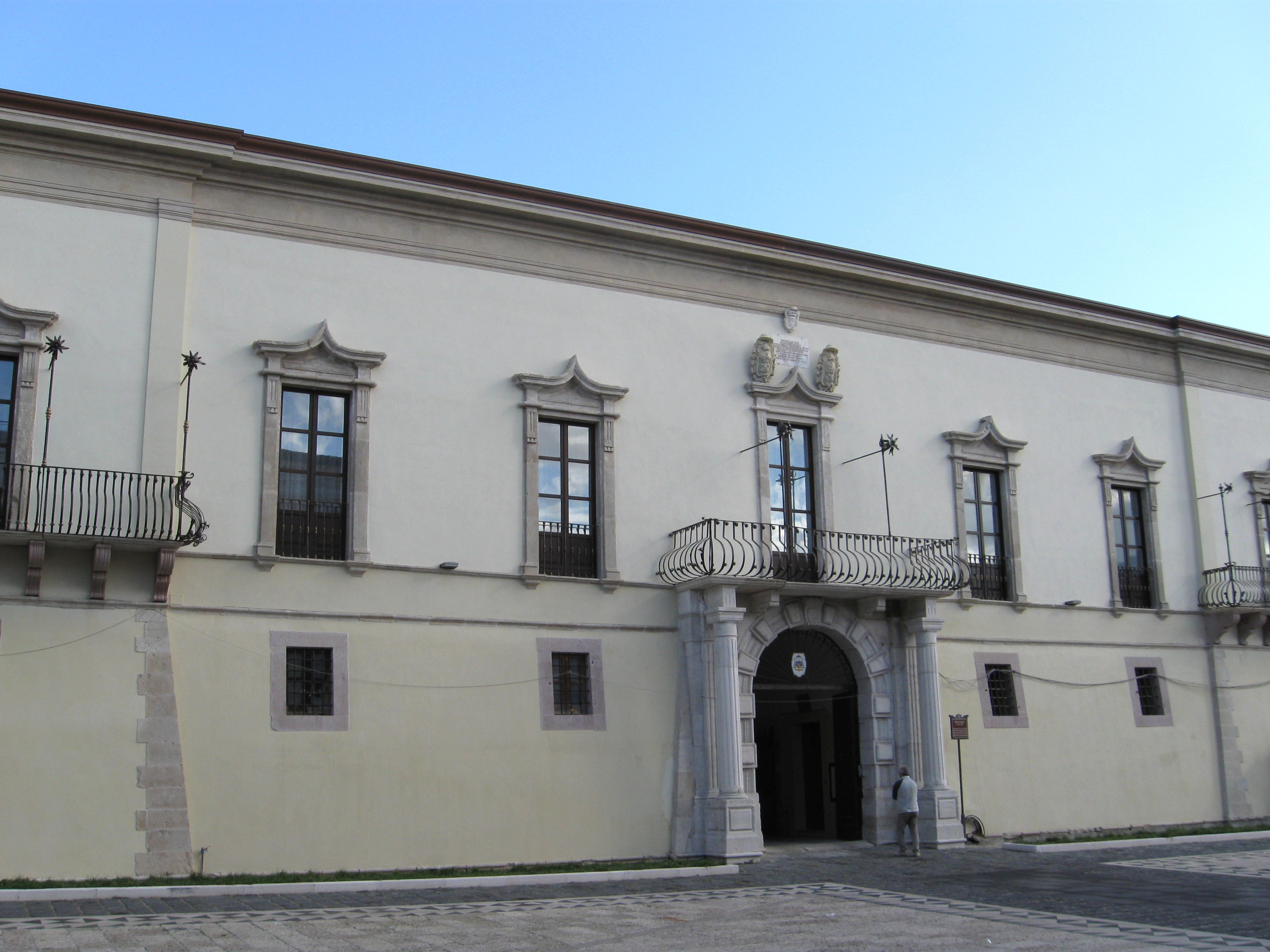
The Bishopric Palace.

=== Palazzo del Vescovado ===
The Palazzo del Vescovado (Bishopric Palace), erected in the 11th century but rebuilt in the baroque style in the 18th century because of the earthquakes. It contains paintings by Nicholas of Tolentino and Cristiano Danona.

=== Norman Walls ===
The town winds along the Norman walls, with various gates, the most noteworthy being the Venosina gate (dating to the early 13th century), an ogival arch with two cylindrical towers on either side.

=== Museum ===
Since 1976 the Castle is home to the important Museo Nazionale Archeologico Melfese, with artifacts found in the area, from prehistoric times and all periods of settlement including the Daunian, Samnite, Lucanian and Roman periods. The most famous piece is the sarcophagus of Rapolla, a valuable example of imperial sculpture from the 2nd century CE, which came to light in 1856. There are collections of the archaic era (7th-6th century BC) with male and female funerary objects including amber pendants and the so-called Lavello cup. Of the 5th and century BC are the Hellenic-style finds - red ceramic figures called figulae and other princely objects. There are also Samnite artifacts from the 5th-3rd century BC, mostly in ivory and bone, as well as examples of Canosino pottery.

=== The rock church of Santa Margherita ===
The rock church of Santa Margherita is completely dug out of volcanic tofa. Its architectonic structure and the style of its frescos are dated to the 13th century. It is the most beautiful and best preserved amongst the numerous frescoed caves found on the slopes of mt. Vulture, an evident result of an ancient and widespread monastic settlement. The phenomenon of rock churches in Southern Italy dates back to the monastic migration from Asia Minor and Balkans after the iconoclastic battles of the early 8th century.

== Economy ==
=== Industry ===
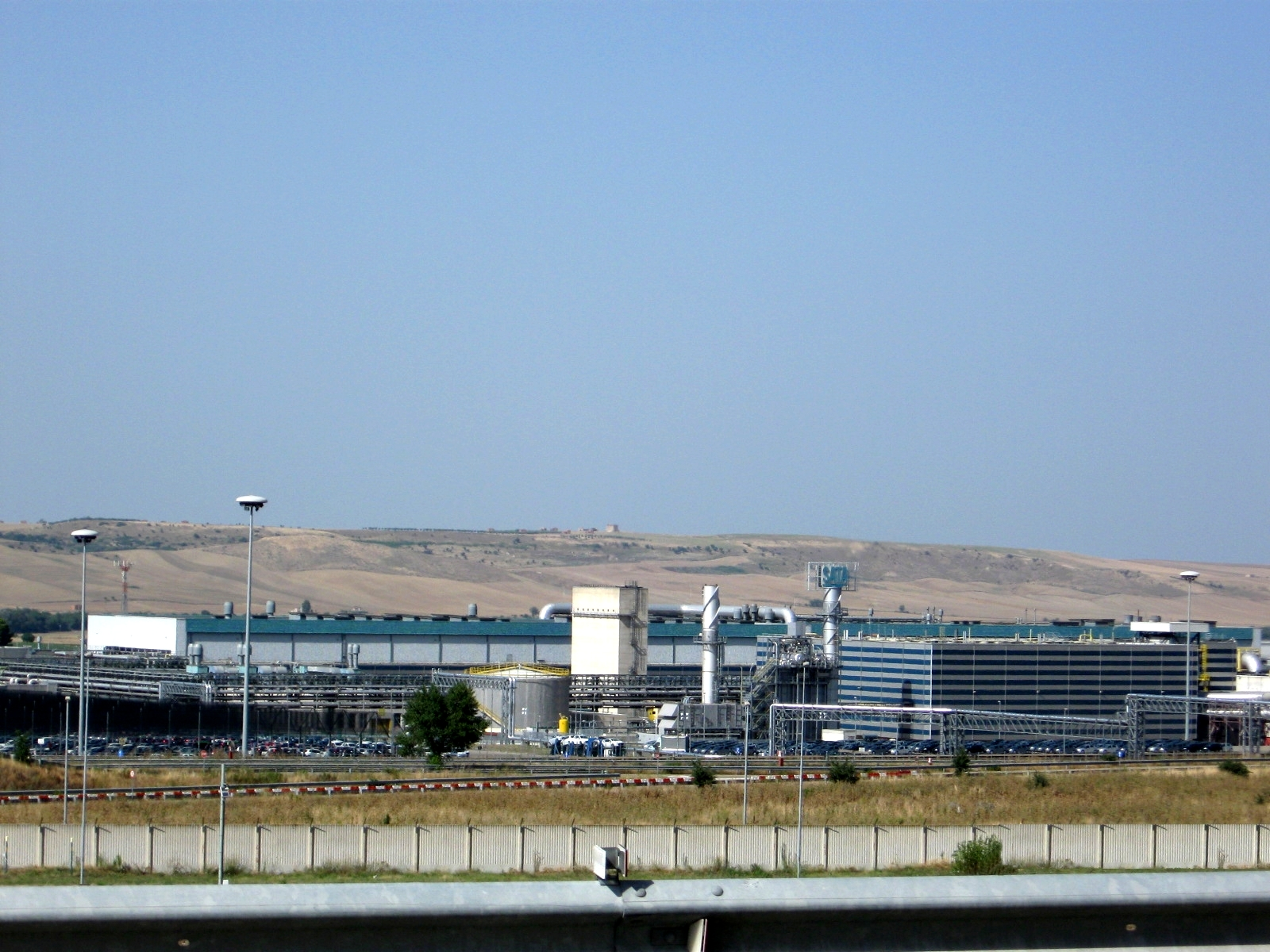
FCA industrial plant.

Melfi was mainly an agricultural center until the beginning of the nineties, since then the industrial sector received a boost in the frazione of San Nicola, with the building of an automobile factory owned by Fiat. The plant contributed to the economic recovery of the company in the mid-nineties and the growth of its market share in Europe.

There are also about 30 companies linked to the plant, including Magneti Marelli, Tower Automotive, Benteler, Proma and Lear. The Fiat of Melfi has produced cars such as Grande Punto and Lancia Ypsilon and today is focused on the production of the Fiat 500X and of the Jeeps Renegade and Compass. The plant has produced 5.000.000 vehicles up to 2010.

In July 2018, this plant was also mentioned in international news after its workers announced a strike so as to protest about their conditions in view of the acquisition of the international football star Cristiano Ronaldo by Juventus FC of Turin. This football club is owned by the Agnelli family who also owns Fiat Chrysler.

Melfi also hosts a Barilla factory, built in 1994, and the seat of Gaudianello's mineral water company, among the top 10 national companies in the sector and founded in Rionero in Vulture, where the extraction is carried out.

=== Food production ===
Melfi is one of the cities in the Vulture area involved in the production of the "Aglianico del Vulture", recognized as DOC, considered one of the greatest red wines of Italy, and the olive oil "Vulture". Another renowned product is the "marroncino", a type of chestnut used for many sweet and salty recipes and is precious for the industries specialized in the preparation of the marron glacé.

== Sport ==
The local football club is the A.S. Melfi, and its home ground is the Stadio Arturo Valerio.

== People ==
- Andrea Doria (1466–1560) - admiral and politician, Prince of Melfi
- Luca Pinelli (1542–1607) - jesuit and theologian
- Francesco Saverio Nitti (1868–1953) - economist and politician, prime minister of Italy from 1919 to 1920
- Pasquale Festa Campanile (1927–1986) - screenwriter and film director
- Anthony Franciosa (1928–2006) - actor
