= Santa Maria da Nives, Atella =

Church building in Atella, Italy

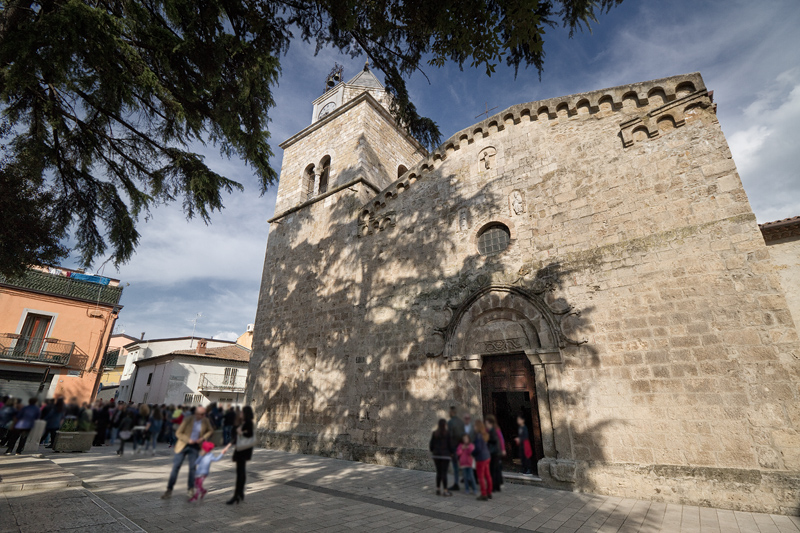

The Duomo of Santa Maria ad Nives is a Roman Catholic church, formerly cathedral, located in Atella, province of Potenza, region of Basilicata, Italy.

The church has undergone a number of reconstructions and contains an eclectic array of styles. The stone façade dates to the 13th century with a gothic-style portal and rose window, but the interiors were completed mainly in the 18th-century. The façade has statues of St Anthony Abbot and San Nicola di Bari. The interior has altarpieces depicting the Annunciation (circa 1500) and a Madonna della Neve from 1800.
