= Leopold Saverio Vaccaro =

Leopold Saverio Vaccaro was a noted Italian-born American surgeon and scientist who was decorated for assisting with the reconstruction of Italy in the aftermath of World War I.

== Biographical Information ==
Born February 2, 1887, in Rionero in Vulture, Italy, to Giovanni Battista Vaccaro, a tailor, and Maria Rachele Laus. Vaccaro immigrated to the United States from his native country as a child, in 1902. He took his medical training at the Medico-Chirurgical College of Philadelphia, graduating in 1916. In the first years of his career, he worked as a staff surgeon at munitions plants run by E.I. DuPont de Numours Co., served in the Delaware National Guard, and made trips to Chile to do medical research.

In 1921 he was made Chevalier of the Crown of Italy for his efforts raising one quarter million dollars for rehabilitation of that country after World War I. His medical career was taking off at the same time, as he joined the staff of Pennsylvania Hospital and was appointed to the medical faculty of the University of Pennsylvania. He published on a range of topics, both medical and historical. He had an academic interest in Leonardo da Vinci.

Further decorations earned by Vaccaro include the title Commander of the Crown of Italy and an honorary medical degree from the University of Rome La Sapienza. Vaccaro was married to Pierina Chiera, who was the sister of the archaeologist and writer Edward Chiera, discoverer of the famed clay tablets of Nuzi.

== Legacy ==
Vaccaro has been described as a "community spokesman" by Historian Richard A. Varbero in Allen Freeman Davis and Mark H. Haller's book The Peoples of Philadelphia: A History of Ethnic Groups and Lower-class Life: 1790-1940. Varbero reprinted a quote of Vaccaro's that originally appeared in January 1929 in the Italian-American newspaper, La Libera Parola, concerning 'Americanization.' In that article, Vaccaro stated "The ideals preached by the Americanization teacher do not coincide with the attitude of the gang boss, the native union man, the fellow workingman, who, although compelled economically to work with the alien, would not voluntarily have him as a neighbor. Theory and practice are not synonymous."
