= Vulture (region) =

The Vulture Il Vulture Vulture–Melfese Vulture–Alto Bradano
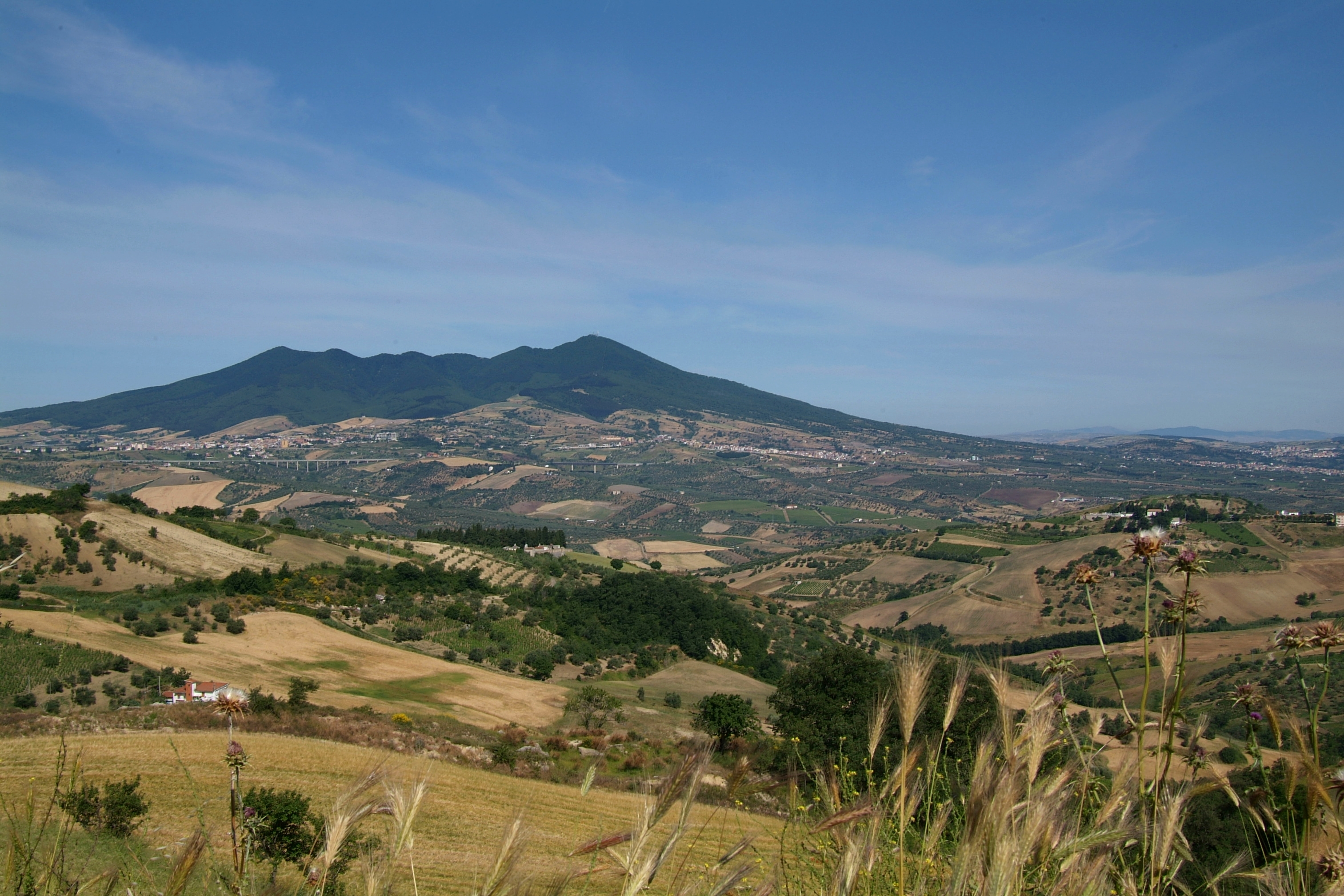

- Location of the Vulture in Basilicata
- Coordinates: 40.95°N 15.7°E
- Country: Italy
- Region: Basilicata
- Province: Potenza
- Comuni: Atella, Barile, Ginestra, Lavello, Melfi, Rapolla, Ripacandida, Rionero in Vulture, Maschito, Venosa, Ruvo del Monte, Rapone, San Fele
- Demonym: vulturini
- Website: www.ilvulture.it

The Vulture (Italian: Il Vulture, IPA: [ˈvulture]), also known as the Vulture-Melfese or Vulture-Alto Bradano, is a geographical and historical region in the northern part of the province of Potenza, in the Basilicata region of Italy.

== Geography ==
The area consists of the comuni of Atella, Barile, Ginestra, Lavello, Melfi, Rapolla, Ripacandida, Rionero in Vulture, Maschito, Venosa, Ruvo del Monte, Rapone, and San Fele. The area takes its name from the inactive volcano Monte Vulture (1326 m). Sights include the two lakes of Monticchio within the crater of the volcano, and the castles of Frederick II of Hohenstaufen at Castel Lagopesole and Melfi.

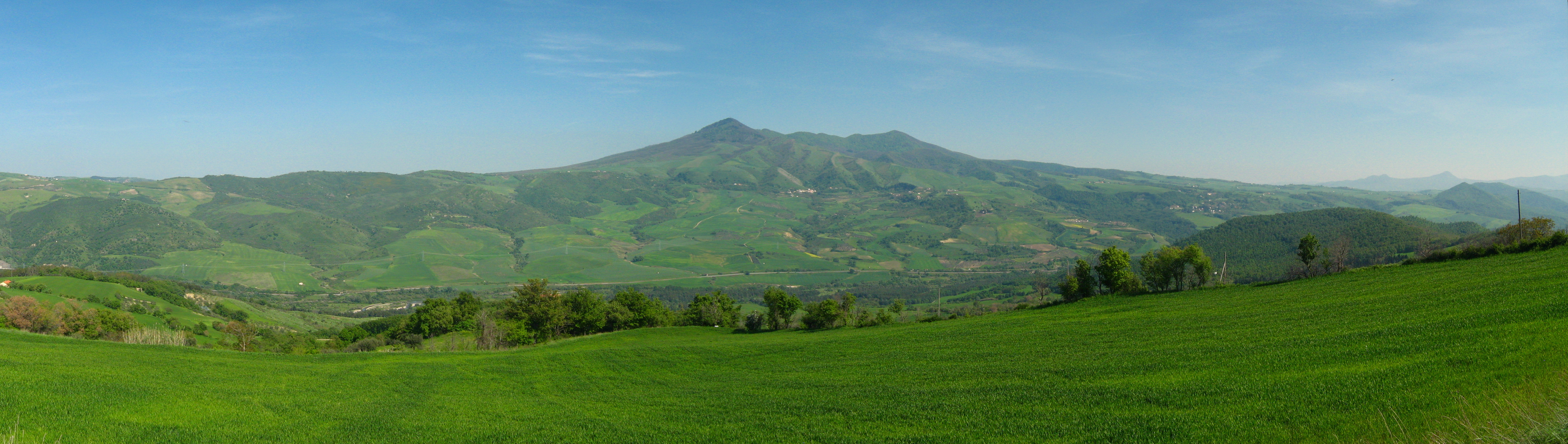
View of the Vulture from Monteverde, Campania

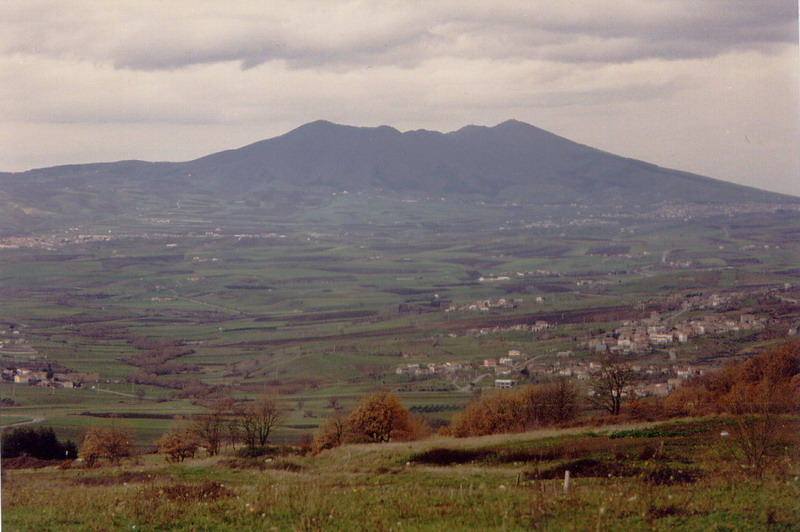
Mount Vulture an inactive volcano at an elevation of 1,326m

== Produce ==
The fertile volcanic soil of the Vulture is suitable for the cultivation of grapes and olives. The DOC wine Aglianico del Vulture is produced in the region, as are Aglianico dolce, a dessert wine, Aglianico di Filiano, Malvasia del Vulture and Moscato del Vulture. The area of Monte Vulture has numerous springs, and several brands of mineral water are bottled there.

== See also ==
- Aglianico del Vulture
- Monte Vulture
- Monticchio
