= Atella, Basilicata =

Atella
- Comune
- Comune di Atella
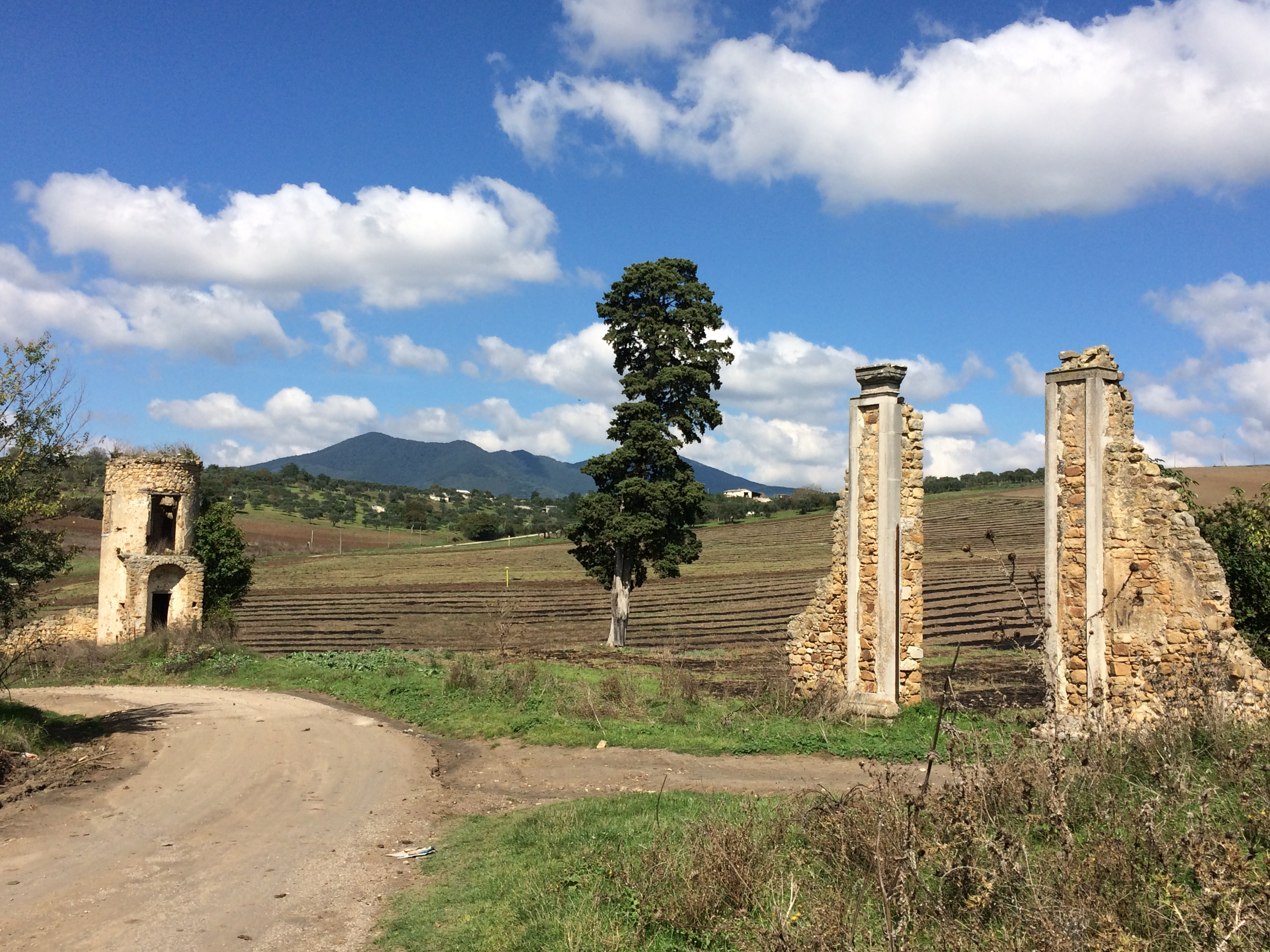
- Torre degli Embrici, an archaeological site in Atella

- Coat of arms

- Location of Atella in Italy Atella (Basilicata)
- Coordinates: 40°52′N 15°39′E
- Country: Italy
- Region: Basilicata
- Province: Potenza (PZ)
- Frazioni: Montesirico, Monticchio Laghi, Sant'Andrea, Sant'Ilario

Government
  - Mayor: Gerardo Lucio Petruzzelli

Area
  - Total: 88.48 km^{2} (34.16 sq mi)
- Elevation: 500 m (1,600 ft)

Population (30 April 2017)
  - Total: 3,841
  - Density: 43.41/km^{2} (112.4/sq mi)
- Demonym: Atellani
- Time zone: UTC+1 (CET)
  - Summer (DST): UTC+2 (CEST)
- Postal code: 85020
- Dialing code: 0972
- ISTAT code: 076006
- Website: Official website

Atella (Lucano: Ratèdde) is a town and comune in the province of Potenza, in the Southern Italian region of Basilicata.

It is bounded by the comuni of Avigliano, Bella, Calitri, Filiano, Rionero in Vulture, Ripacandida, Ruvo del Monte and San Fele.

== See also ==
- Santa Maria da Nives, Atella
- Monticchio
- Vulture (region)
