= Monte Vulture =

Mountain in Italy

Mount Vulture
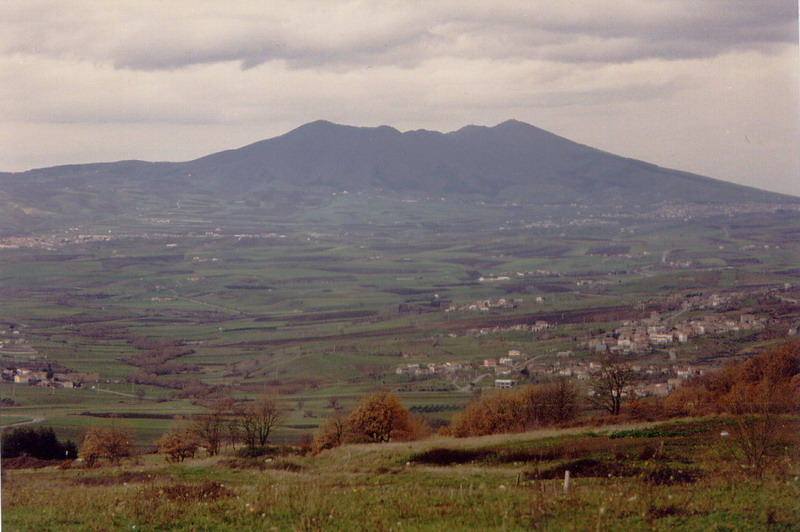

Highest point
- Elevation: 1,326 m (4,350 ft)
- Prominence: 696 m (2,283 ft)
- Coordinates: 40°56′54″N 15°38′08″E

Geography
- Location: Basilicata, Italy

Geology
- Last eruption: 40,000 years ago

Mount Vulture (Italian: [ˈvulture]) is an inactive volcano located 56 km (35 mi) north of the city Potenza in the Basilicata region (Italy). As a prominent landmark it gave its name to the Vulture region, the most significant viticultural zone in Basilicata growing the DOC wine Aglianico del Vulture.

With a height of 1,326 m (4,350 ft), it is unique amongst large Italian volcanoes due to its location east of the Apennine mountain range. At the summit is a caldera, known as Valle dei Grigi, whose precise origins are disputed.

== Volcanic history ==
The earliest eruptions of the volcano occurred around one million years ago, explosive activity producing ignimbrite. The explosive eruption phase finished around 830,000 years before present, when the nature of the activity changed to a mix of pyroclastic and effusive, lava eruptions which built up the mountain and which have been dated to around 500,000 years ago. One of the explanations advanced for the Valle dei Grigi is that it is the result of the collapse of a sector of the mountain, as occurred during the 1980 eruption of Mount St. Helens and the 1792 eruption of Mount Unzen.

The most recent phase involved further lava flows and the growth of lava domes in the Valle dei Grigi, including the formation of two calderas. The most recent activity is thought to have been phreatomagmatic explosions around 40 ka ago which produced maars and small cold surges (pyroclastic surges cooler than 100 °C).

Active outgassing of carbon dioxide and other mantle-derived volatiles occur from Monte Vulture and the surrounding region.

== Brahmaea europaea ==
Mount Vulture is also home to the Brahmaea europaea moth, the sole species of its genus in Europe.

== See also ==
- Vulture region
- Monticchio
- List of volcanoes in Italy
