= Rionero in Vulture =

- Comune
- Comune di Rionero in Vulture
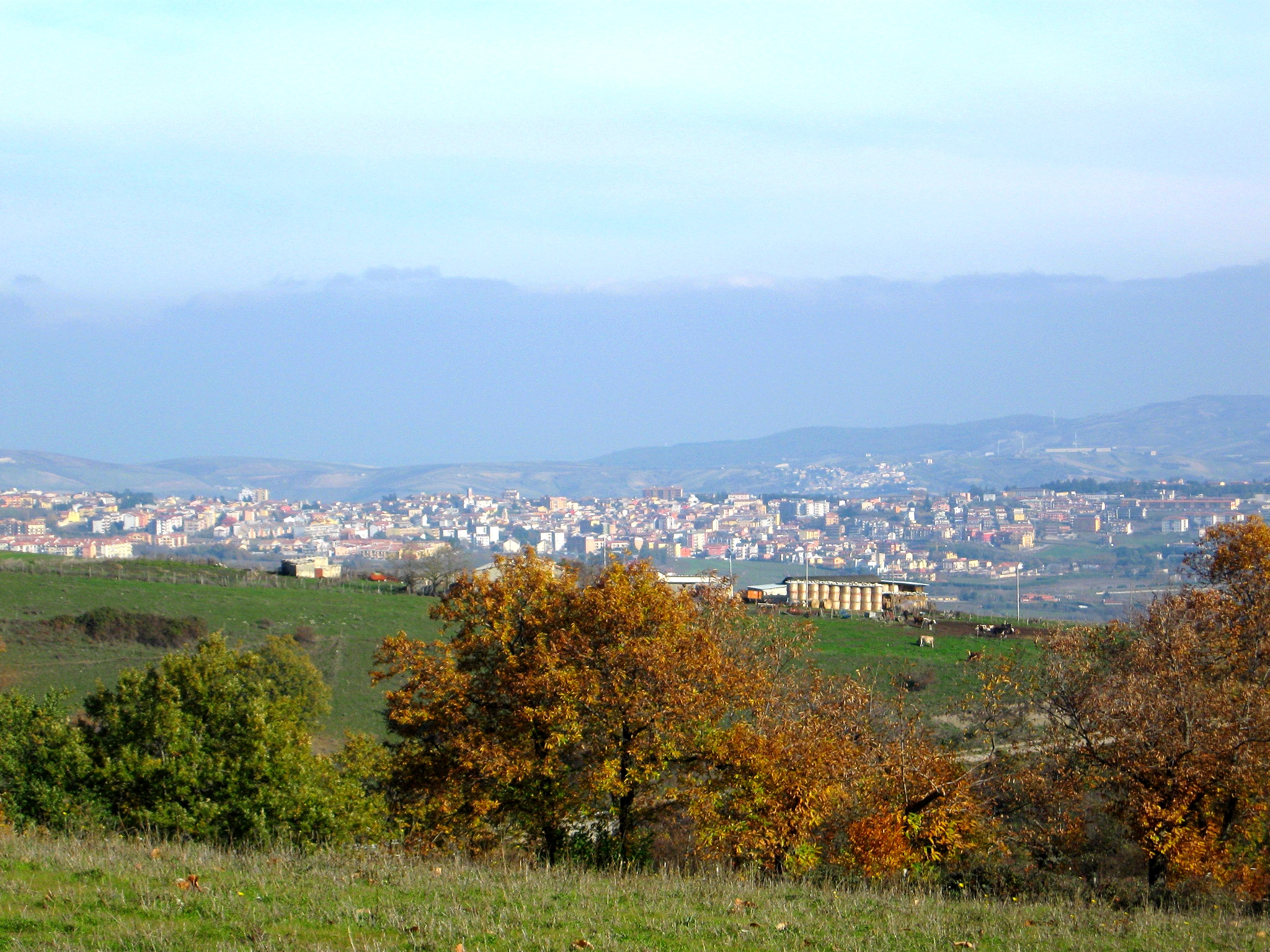
- View of Rionero in Vulture

- Coat of arms

- Location within Italy Location within Basilicata
- Coordinates: 40°55′N 15°40′E
- Country: Italy
- Region: Basilicata
- Province: Potenza (PZ)
- Frazioni: Monticchio Bagni, Monticchio Sgarroni

Government
  - Mayor: Luigi Di Toro

Area
  - Total: 53.52 km^{2} (20.66 sq mi)
- Elevation: 643 m (2,110 ft)

Population (31 December 2015)
  - Total: 13,230
  - Density: 247.2/km^{2} (640.2/sq mi)
- Demonym: Rioneresi
- Time zone: UTC+1 (CET)
  - Summer (DST): UTC+2 (CEST)
- Postal code: 85028
- Dialing code: 0972
- ISTAT code: 076066
- Patron saint: St. Mark
- Saint day: April 25
- Website: Official website

Rionero in Vulture (Arbëreshë Albanian: Arrionero) is a town and comune in the province of Potenza, in the southern Italian region of Basilicata. It is located on the slopes of Monte Vulture in the northern part of the region. The village was founded and historically inhabited by the Arbëreshë minority, who no longer retain the language and the cultural Arbëreshe heritage.

== History ==
The first historical mention of the hamlet of Saint Maria di Rivonigro goes back to 1152, when it is mentioned as a feudal possession of the bishop of Rapolla. In 1316 the inhabitants of Rionero abandoned their hamlet and took part in the construction of the village of Atella which had received tax concessions. The hamlet remained unpopulated during most of the 14th and 15th centuries until the influx of refugees from Albania (i.e. from Scutari and Corona) and several groups taking advantage of tax exemptions promulgated in those years. Its history overlaps with those of the neighbors Barile, Melfi, Ginestra ("Lombarda Massa") and Maschito.

On April 1, 1502 Louis d'Armagnac, Duke of Nemours and Gonzalo Fernández de Córdoba met at the Church of St. Antonio Abate in Rionero to negotiate whether France or Spain would control the provinces of Principato Citra, Principato Ultra, Capitanata, and Basilicata.

In 1627 the inhabitants of Rionero were forced to change their religious observances from the Greek rite to the Latin rite by Diodato Scaglia, the Bishop of Melfi.

Seriously struck by the earthquake of 1694, Rionero's population in that period did not exceed 700. Later on the Caracciolo, princes of Torella, to whom belonged the feudal rights, granted permission for the deforestation, the tillage, and the cultivation of lands occupied from the forests of the locality "Gaudo" and as a result of the consequent economic development the population endured a strong growth: in the year 1735 the inhabitants had grown to approximately 3,000, in 1752 to approximately 9,000 and by 1811 they had exceeded 11,000. In this year, on May 4, the ancient hamlet obtained the administrative autonomy as a comune from King Joachim Murat. By the mid 19th century the population grew until reaching approximately 20,000 inhabitants. The successive and periodic waves of emigration diminished the population down to roughly 14,000 inhabitants.

After the Italian unification, Rionero gave the birth to Carmine Crocco, the most well-known brigand of that period.

On 23 September 1943, German paratroopers of the 1st Parachute Division retreated from Atella after being shelled by Canadian artillery. They withdrew northward and for two more days they occupied Rionero. On September 24, sixteen Rioneresi were massacred in the Largo San Antonio by the paratroopers. Two days later on September 26, patrols from the Princess Patricia's Canadian Light Infantry attached to the 1st Canadian Infantry Division entered Rionero and the neighboring town of Barile unopposed.

== People ==
- Giustino Fortunato senior - magistrate and politician
- Giustino Fortunato - historian and politician
- Carmine Crocco - brigand
- Young Corbett III - Italian-American boxer
- Beniamino Placido - journalist, writer and television critic
- Leopold Saverio Vaccaro - surgeon, scientist, assisted with the reconstruction of Italy after World War I

== See also ==
- Monticchio
- Vulture (region)
