= Joseph Forlenze =

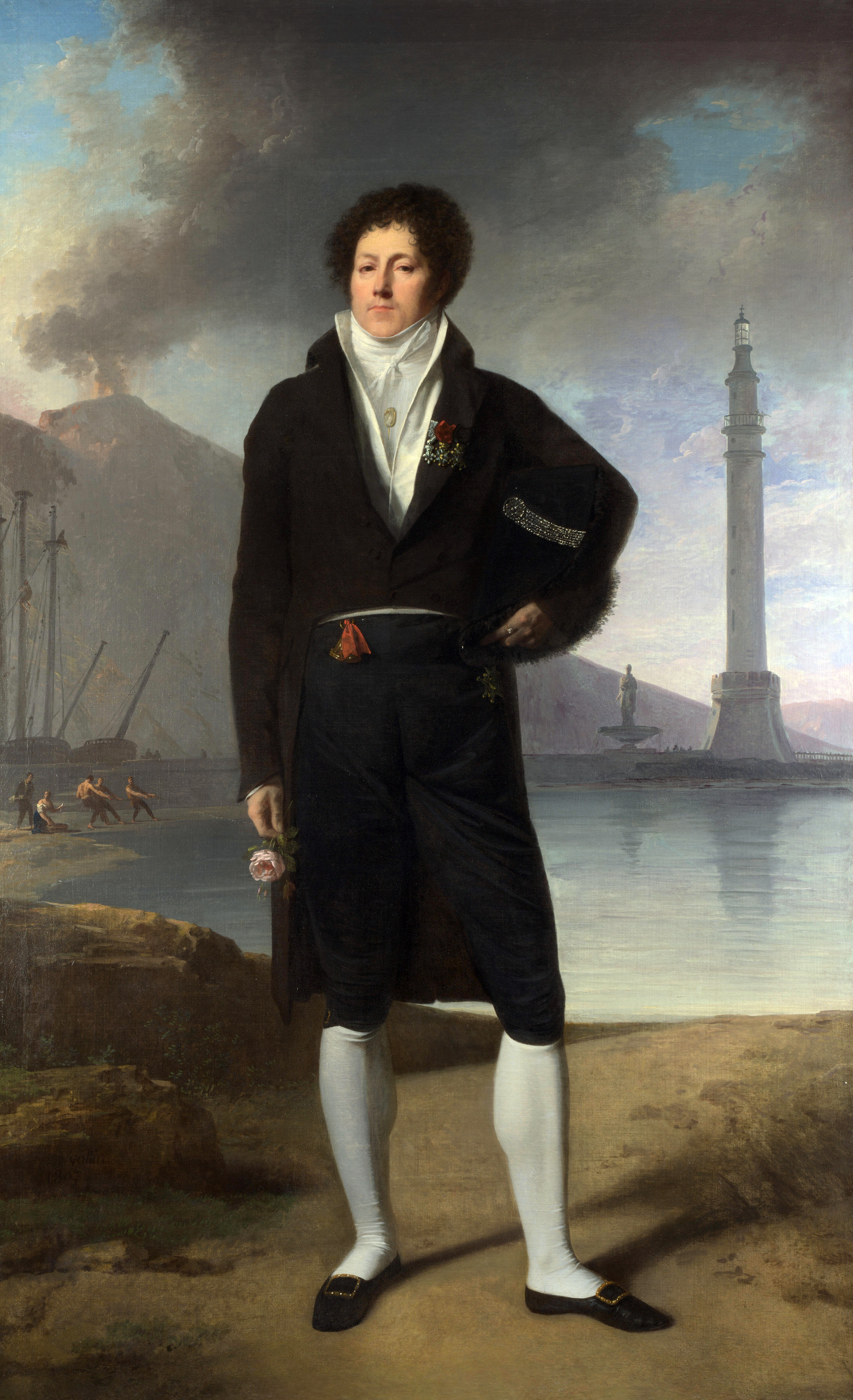
- Born: 3 February 1757; Picerno, Basilicata
- Died: 22 July 1833 (aged 76); Paris, Île-de-France
- Scientific career
- Fields: Ophthalmology
- Workplaces: Hôtel national des Invalides; Hôtel-Dieu

Joseph-Nicolas-Blaise Forlenze (born Giuseppe Nicolò Leonardo Biagio Forlenza, 3 February 1757 – 22 July 1833), was an Italian ophthalmologist and surgeon, considered one of the most important ophthalmologists between the 18th and the 19th century. He was mostly known in France under the French Revolution and the Napoleonic Empire, for his cataract surgery.

== Biography ==
Son of Felice and Vita Pagano, Forlenze was born at Picerno (Basilicata), at the time part of the Kingdom of Naples, from a family of physicians. His father Felice, his uncles Sebastiano and Giuseppe were barber surgeons of the noble family Capece Minutolo from Ruoti. After attending the catechism class at Ruoti, he moved to Naples to study surgery and continued his formation in France under the teachings of Pierre-Joseph Desault, of whom he became a close friend and collaborator for his anatomical studies.

Subsequently, Forlenze went to England, where he stayed two years, increasing his experience at the St George's Hospital in London, then directed by John Hunter; he also traveled in the Netherlands and Germany. Returning to France, he began his ophthalmologist career. He determined the different eye diseases and represented them on masks of wax.

In 1797, he practised an eye surgery at a retirement home in Paris, in the presence of a commission appointed by the Institute, as well as several members of the government, and French and foreign scholars. In 1798, he became surgeon at the Hôtel national des Invalides and the Hôtel-Dieu of Paris, where he made many remarkable interventions.

Forlenze cured the soldiers of Napoleon's army returning from Egypt, affected by serious eye diseases. He healed renowned personalities such as Jean-Étienne-Marie Portalis, minister of Worship, and the poet Ponce Denis Lebrun, removing a cataract which had been present for twelve years from one of his eyes. Lebrun dedicated to him a verse in his ode called Les conquêtes de l’homme sur la nature. Napoleon, with a royal decree, gave him the assignment of "chirurgien oculiste of the lycees, the civil hospices and all the charitable institutions of the departments of the Empire", thus Forlenze was sent into the French provinces to treat eye diseases.

His activity extended to England and Italy, where he performed free surgeries in cities such as Turin and Rome. In Rome, he cured the Cardinal Doria and was publicly honored by Caroline de Bourbon, Duchesse de Berry. His manuscript Considérations sur l'opération de la pupille artificielle (1805) is considered one of the most important medical works of the time. Forlenze died on 22 July 1833, stricken with apoplexy at the "Café de Foy", in Paris, where he spent often his evenings.

== Works ==
- Considérations sur l'opération de la pupille artificielle, 1805
- Notice sur le développement de la lumière et des sensations dans les aveugles-nés, à la suite de l'opération de la cataracte, 1817

== Honors ==
- Legion of Honour, Knight
- Order of St Michael and St George, Honorary Knight

== Bibliography ==
- Jan E. Goldstein, Console and Classify. The French Psychiatric Profession in the Nineteenth Century, Chicago Press, 2002
- Rabbe, Sainte-Preuve, Biographie universelle et portative des contemporains, Chez l'éditeur, 1834
- Marie-Nicolas Bouillet, Alexis Chassang, Dictionnaire universel d’histoire et de géographie, Hachette, 1878
