= Castel Lagopesole =

- Frazione
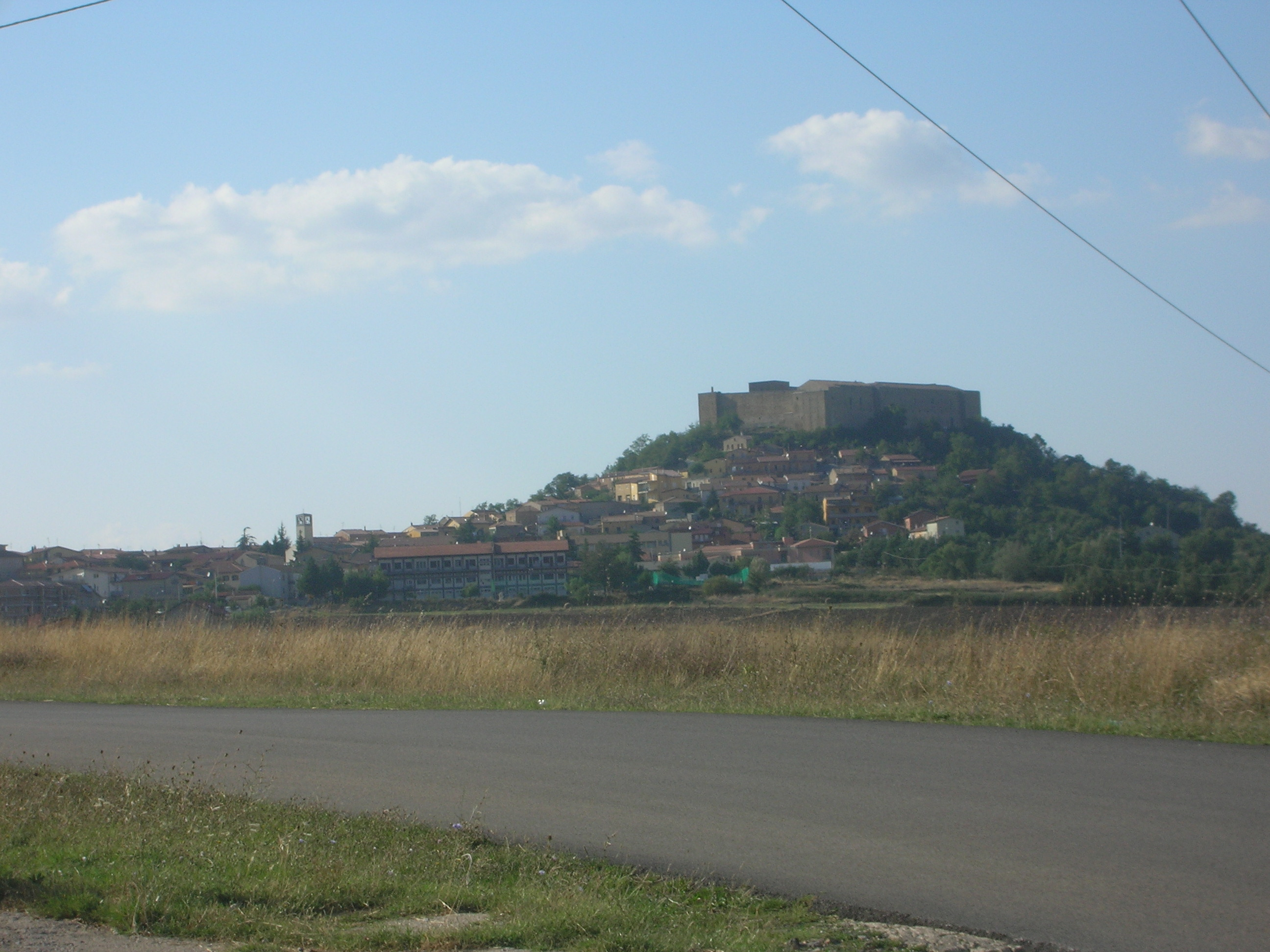
- View of Castel Lagopesole

- Location of Castel Lagopesole in Italy
- Coordinates: 40°48′16.8″N 15°44′00″E
- Country: Italy
- Region: Basilicata
- Province: Potenza
- Comune: Avigliano
- Elevation: 829 m (2,720 ft)

Population (2010)
  - Total: 652
- Demonym: castellani
- Time zone: UTC+1 (CET)
  - Summer (DST): UTC+2 (CEST)
- Postal code: 85020
- Dialing code: 0971

Castel Lagopesole, or simply Lagopesole, is a village and civil parish (frazione) of the municipality (comune) of Avigliano in province of Potenza, Basilicata, southern Italy. It has a population of 652.

== History ==
The name "Lagopesole" is derived from the presence of a lake near the town known as Lacus Pensilis, which dried up at the beginning of the twentieth century.

Between the eighth and tenth centuries, Lagopesole played a military role for the control of the ancient Via Herculea, which linked Melfi and Potenza.

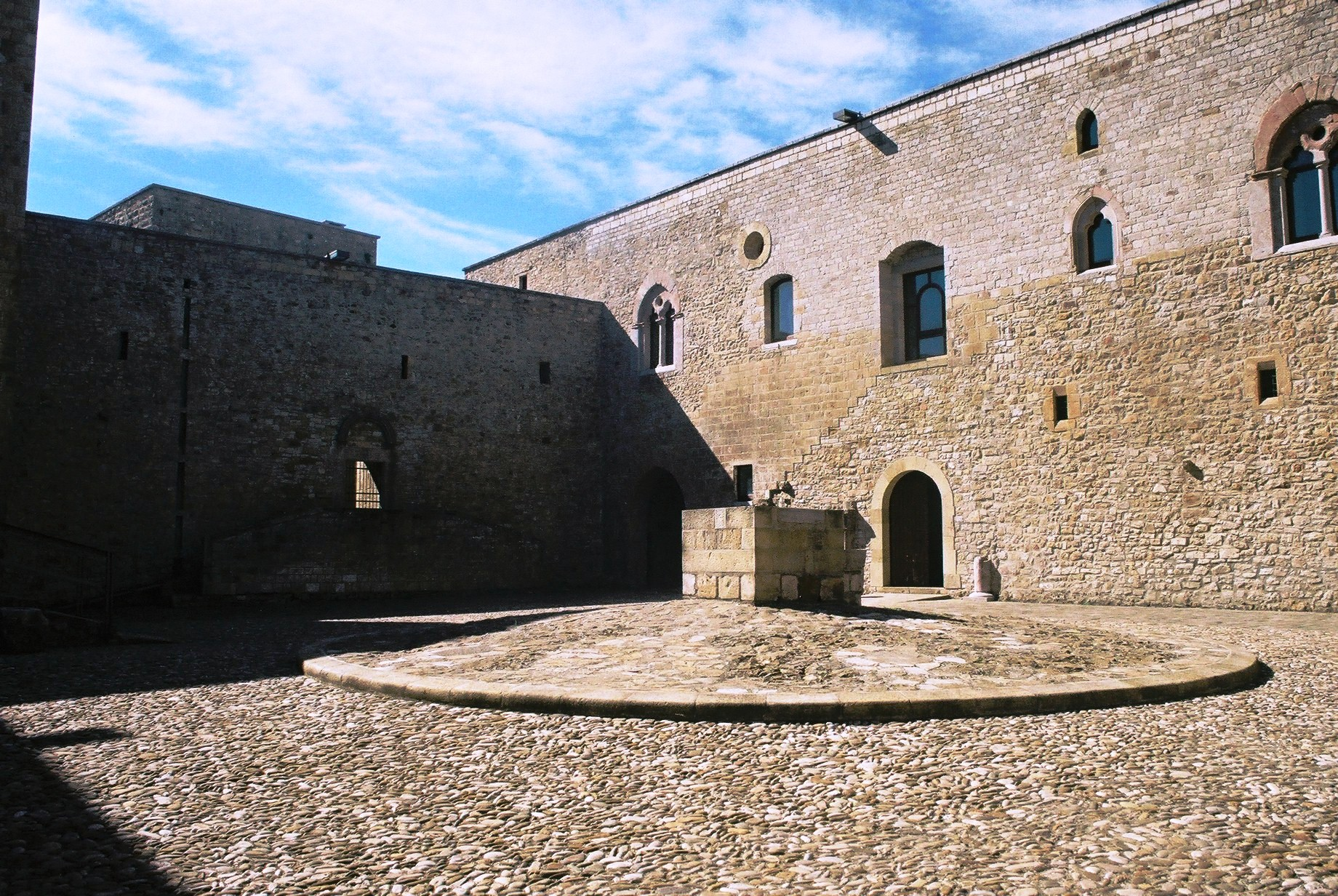
Castel Lagopesole

At the top of Lagopesole is located a castle, attributed to Frederick II that was probably built between 1242 and 1250. A distinguishing feature of this castle from all the others attributed to Frederick II is the presence of a real church within it (not a simple chapel) in an austere Romanesque style.

Pope Innocent II and Abbot Rinaldo of Montecassino met there in the presence of Emperor Lothair II of Saxony during the war against Roger the Norman. In 1268 and 1294, Charles I of Anjou stayed at the castle. In 1416, both this fortress and the Melfi castle were acquired by the Caracciolo family. In 1531, Emperor Charles V donated it to the Doria family.

In the nineteenth century, the castle was the refuge of bandits, led by Carmine "Donatelli" Crocco, who, on April 7, 1861, occupied it with 400 other brigands.

== Geography ==
Lagopesole is located 27 km north of Potenza and 33km south of Melfi, and is intersected by the National Road "SS 93". It is 5 km from Filiano and 20km from Avigliano. In the zone of Pian del Lago, it is situated the bed of a dry lake, Lago Pesole.

== Transport ==
The village is served by the national road SS 658, which forms part of a highway linking Potenza and Foggia. The railway station is located in the surrounding village of Sarnelli, 3 km to the south, and is part of the Foggia-Potenza line.

== Gallery ==
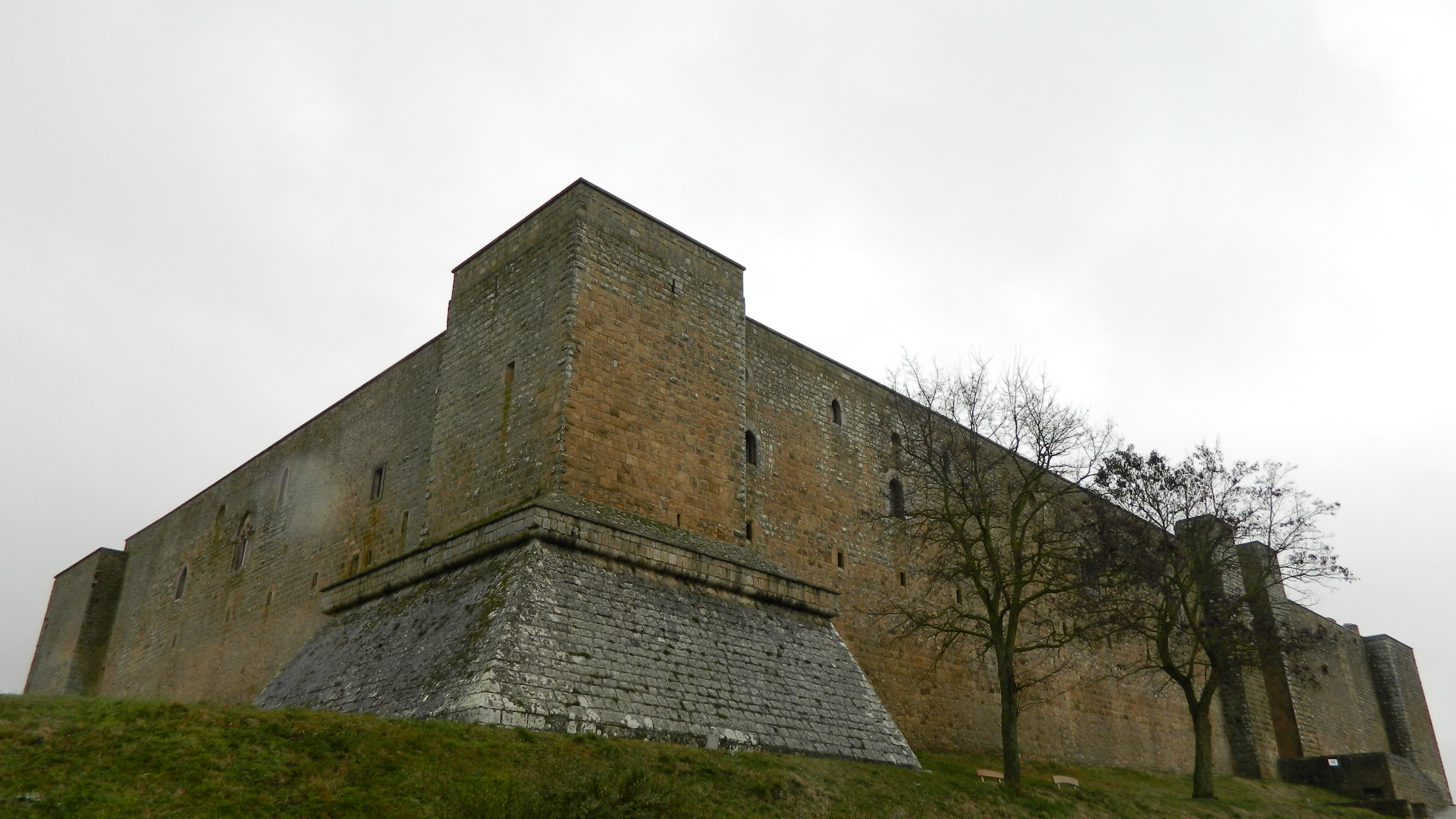
View of the castle

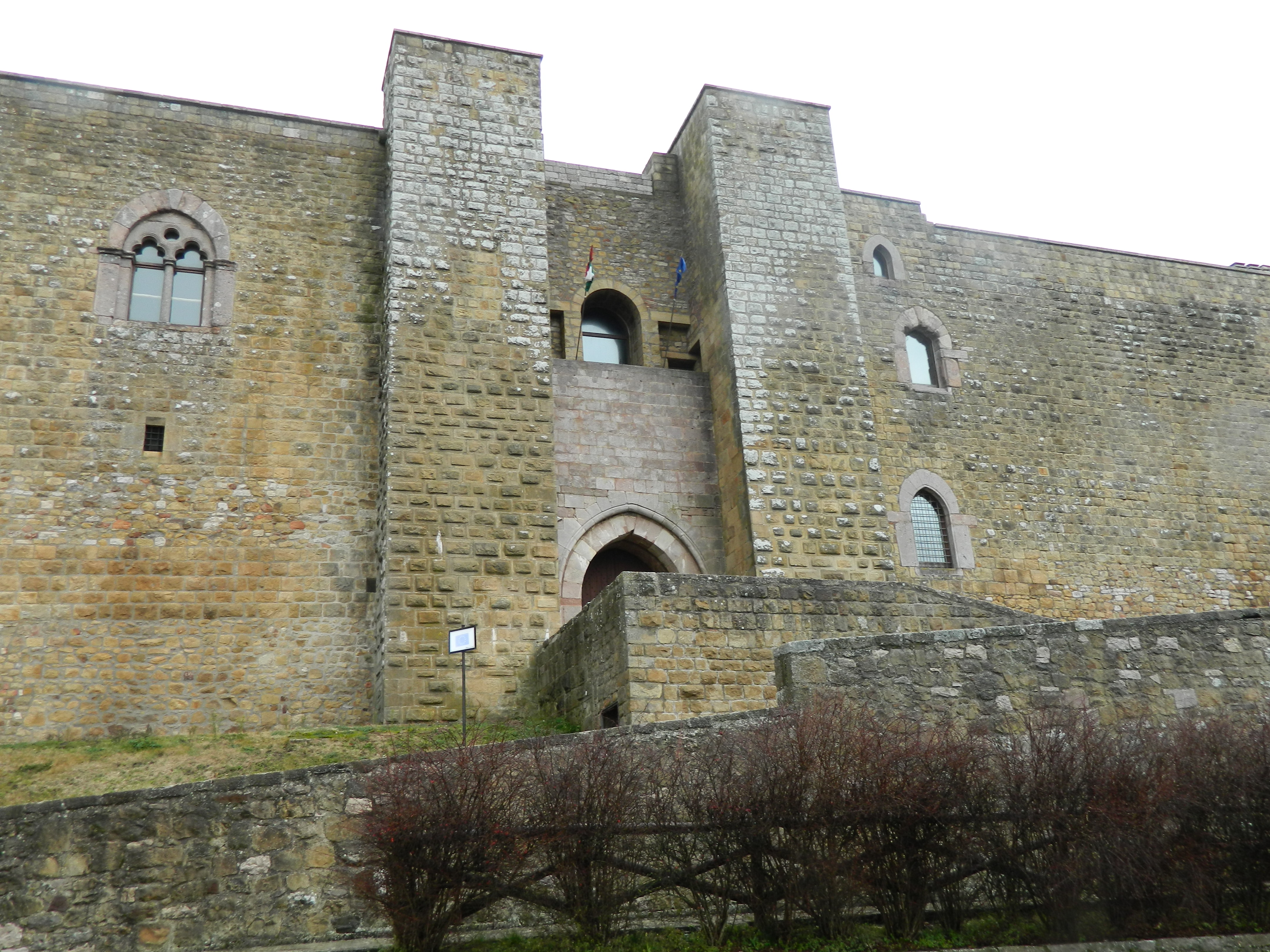
View of the castle
