= Jean Méry =

French surgeon and anatomist (1645–1722)

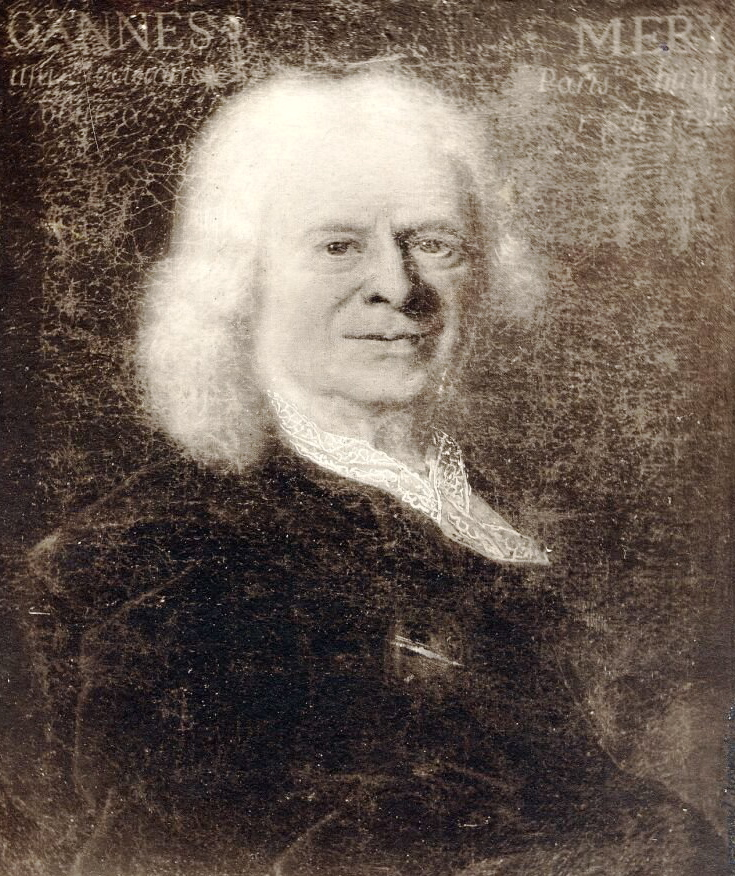
Portrait in the Hôtel-Dieu suggested as having been painted by Hyacinthe Rigaud

Jean Méry (6 January 1645 – 3 November 1722) was a French surgeon and pioneer anatomist. He served as a chief surgeon at the Hôtel-Dieu and published his anatomical studies in a series of papers. Through studies on human cadavers (he dissected as many as two hundred) and animals he made anatomical comparisons and attempted to explain physiology and functioning. He was involved in the professionalization of surgery, establishing a systematic course of anatomical dissections for medical students.

== Life and work ==
Méry was born in Vatan, Duchy of Berry, France and went at the age of 18 to the Hôtel-Dieu in Paris where his father served as a surgeon. Outside his regular studies he also conducted dissections of cadavers secretly in his bedroom. He became surgeon to the Queen in 1681 and rose to Surgeon to the Invalids in 1683, and was admitted into the Academy of Sciences in 1684. In 1684 he was sent to Portugal to help save the Queen but he was too late. 1692 Mery was sent to England by Louis XIV on a secretive mission, possibly to examine the claim that the Prince of Wales was illegitimate. In 1697 Frere Jacques, the famous itinerant lithotomist of the time was invited to demonstrate his methods under the supervision of Méry. Jacques was first required to demonstrate his method on a cadaver and afterwards allowed to conduct lithotomies on patients. Out of 71 patients 53% died from complications and Méry conducted autopsies to identify the causes. This led to Frere Jacques being debarred from conducting surgeries in Paris. Méry became chief surgeon at the Hôtel-Dieu in 1700. His anatomical studies involved careful dissection and the preservation of specimens which he used for teaching. He examined Cowper's gland in 1684 well before Cowper's description in 1699. In 1693 he compared blood flow in the heart of a large land tortoise and compared it to the structures of the heart in a human foetus and claimed that fetal circulation differed from that in adult humans as pointed out by William Harvey. He used the cross sections of the arteries and veins to formulate his idea on blood flows, including ideas on the foramen ovale, but erred in his conclusions. The debate surrounding it however provided impetus for more detailed studies. He made examinations of the fundus of a cat's eye and conducted a post-mortem study of the eye of a human with iris bombé and finding no fluid between the iris and the lens, he inferred that the aqueous humor was generated behind the lens and suggested that glands he noticed were involved in their production. He argued with Philippe de La Hire on the mechanism of control of the pupil opening by the iris, again incorrectly.

Méry was unable to walk at the age of 75 and was confined to his home until his death. Méry's students included François Poupart. He had six children by Catherine-Geneviève Carrere, daughter of a former surgeon to the queen.
