= Hôtel-Dieu de Paris =

Parisian hospital near Notre Dame

Coordinates: 48.854665°N 2.348808°E

Hôtel-Dieu
- Assistance Publique–Hôpitaux de Paris
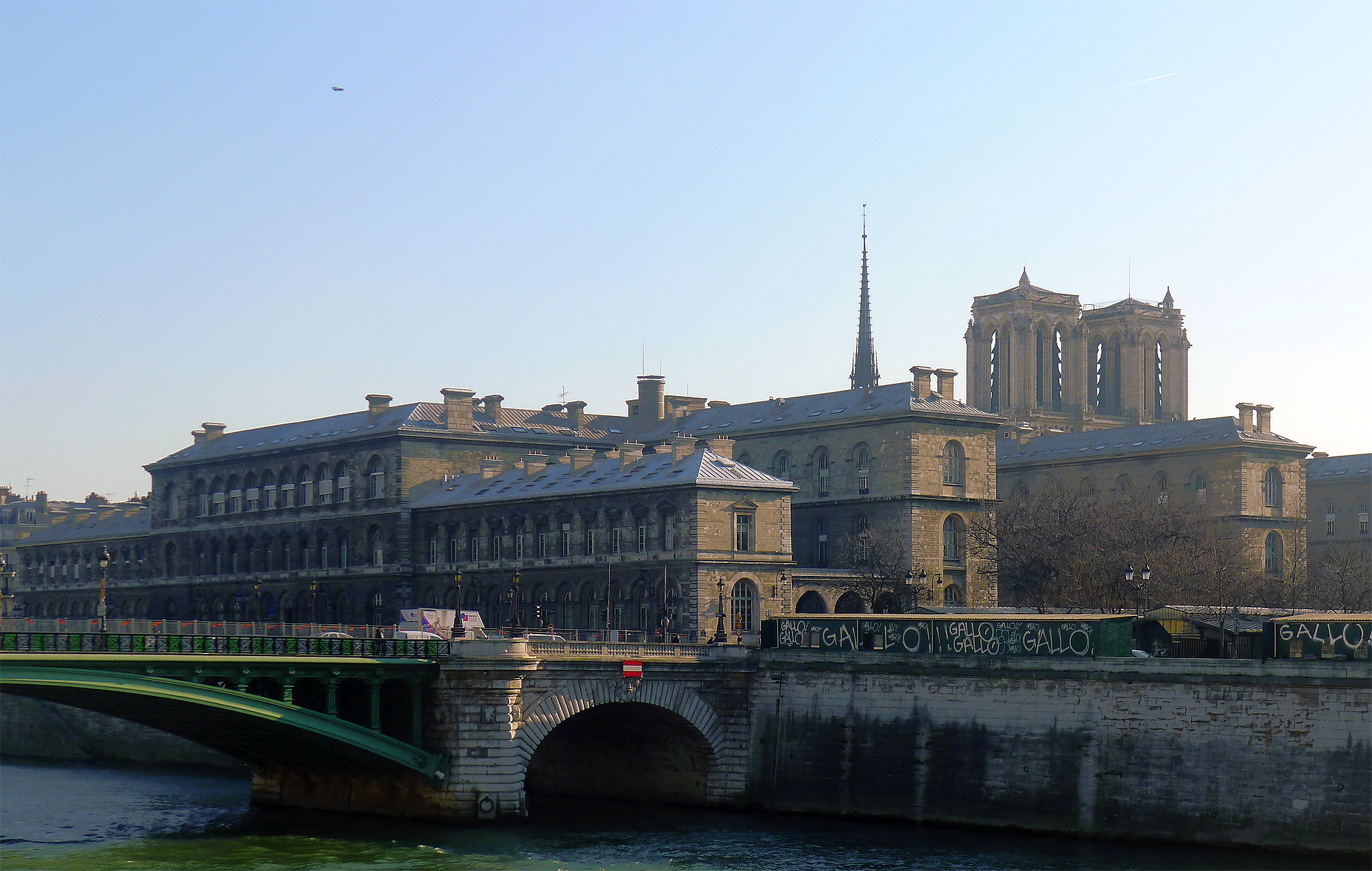
- View of the Hôtel-Dieu from the Tour Saint-Jacques

Geography
- Location: 1 Parvis Notre-Dame – Place Jean-Paul-II; 75004 Paris, France

Organisation
- Care system: Public
- Type: District General

Services
- Emergency department: Yes
- Beds: 349

History
- Opened: 829; 1197 years ago

Links
- Website: www.aphp.fr
- Lists: Hospitals in France

The Hôtel-Dieu (French pronunciation: [otɛl djø]; "God Shelter") is a public hospital located on the Île de la Cité in the 4th arrondissement of Paris, on the parvis of Notre-Dame. Tradition has it that the hospital was founded by Saint Landry in 651 AD, but the first official records date it to 829, making it the oldest in France and possibly the oldest continuously operating hospital in the world. The Hôtel-Dieu was the only hospital in the city until the beginning of the 17th century.

The original Hôtel-Dieu stood on the banks of the Seine on the southern side of the Île de la Cité. It was ravaged by fire several times and was rebuilt for the last time at its present location on the north side of the parvis of Notre Dame between 1867 and 1878, as part of Haussmann's renovation of Paris.

Currently operated by Assistance publique – Hôpitaux de Paris (AP-HP), the Hôtel-Dieu is a teaching hospital associated with the Paris Cité University.

== History ==
=== Overview ===
Originally, the Hôtel-Dieu admitted a wide range of people: not only the sick and injured, but also needy travellers and pilgrims, and indigents. Run by the Catholic Church for many centuries, the hospital's original mission was to provide "Christian charity dedicated to the shelter, spiritual comfort and treatment of the ailing poor."^{:44} An 18th-century essayist, Louis Rondonneau de la Motte, wrote in his Essai Historique sur l'Hôtel-Dieu (1787): "the citizen and the foreigner, the Christian and the Turk, the Jew and the Idolater are all equally welcome."

This broad, charitable mission was to dominate until the end of the Ancien Régime. By 1789, the Age of Enlightenment—with its focus on the pursuit of knowledge via reason and evidence and on ideals such as progress, fraternity, and government dedicated to the well-being of the people—had left its mark on the agenda for hospital reform. This ushered in a more scientific approach to hospital design that was to influence medical practice and management for more than a century. During this process, the role of the Catholic Church was diminished and then eliminated and the Hôtel-Dieu became a publicly run institution.

=== Middle Ages ===
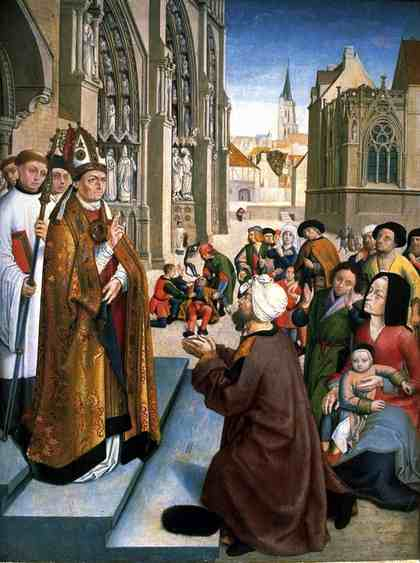
Episodes from the Life of a Bishop-Saint, by the Master of Saint Giles (c. 1500), showing the Gothic buildings of the old Hôtel-Dieu at right

Although tradition dates the founding of the Hôtel-Dieu back to Saint Landry, 28th bishop of Paris around 650, the first official records of an institution whose mission was to care for the destitute, infirm and sick date to 829. In 1157, letters patent mention a "Hôtel-Dieu-Saint-Christophe", referring to a chapel dedicated to this saint. Shortly thereafter, in 1165, Maurice de Sully, bishop of Paris, undertook the reconstruction of this hospital: the old buildings were destroyed in 1195 and the new constructions were completed in 1255. At that time, the buildings of the Hotel Dieu occupied the south side of the Île de la Cité near Notre Dame.

In its first several hundred years, the Hôtel-Dieu functioned as a general purpose charitable institution operated by religious orders — it offered food and shelter in addition to medical care to needy people. This mixed social mission characterised its services for many centuries and was imitated by many other cities (for example, the Hôtel-Dieu de Beaune, founded in 1443). However, by the 16th century, admission to the hospital was available only to the sick and injured and to pregnant women.

From the time of Louis IX onwards, the Hôtel-Dieu often housed more patients than it was designed to hold, leading to serious problems of overcrowding that would hamper the effectiveness of the hospital for centuries. From the 15th to the 16th centuries, it went from 303 beds to about 500, but the number of patients would regularly hover around 700 and would often exceed 1500 during times of conflict, food shortages or epidemics. It is estimated that the number of admissions was 25,000 per year during the 16th century.

Conditions in the hospital were in many cases deplorable, especially toward the end of the Middle Ages when the growth of Paris' poor population outstripped the hospital's capacity. Its vast halls held 80 to 100 beds apiece. Although the halls for the most part had fireplaces or stoves, they were almost impossible to light. At one point, the beds had a width of 1.3 metres and were meant to hold 2 or 3 patients each, arranged heel-to-head. Later, beds meant for one or two patients were installed, but these often had to accommodate more patients than intended. For much of the Middle Ages, there was no surgical ward and surgical operations were performed in the patient's bed, with fellow patients and bedmates as onlookers. An incomplete but emerging understanding of contagion gave rise to rules for isolating patients with contagious diseases, but it was often impossible to apply these rules in practice. The question of how much patients were given to eat was also an issue due to lack of funds, though people of the time understood that an appropriate diet would improve health outcomes.

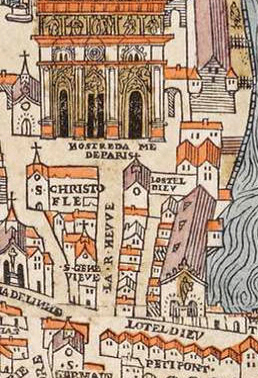
Old Hôtel-Dieu on the map of Truschet and Hoyau

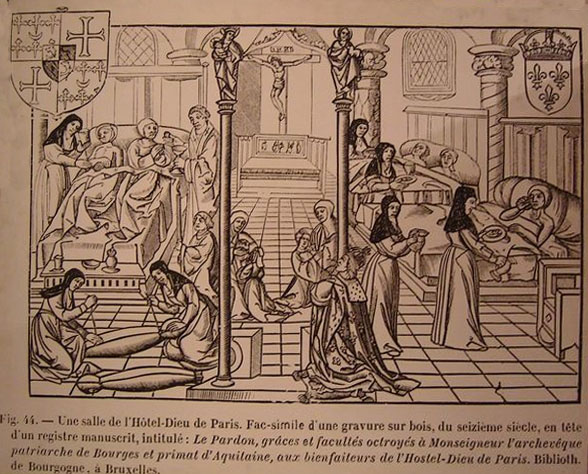
16th-century etching of a hall in the Hôtel-Dieu

By the end of the Middle Ages, only people who could not afford other sources of care would go to the Hôtel-Dieu. But because of the masses of destitute people in the Paris area at the time, there was no shortage of patients. As a result of high demand and finite resources, the Hôtel-Dieu eventually faced a financial crisis. This brought about the first step in the laicization of the hospital, the creation in 1505 of a council of lay governors: the Presidents of Parliament, the Chambre des Comptes, the Cour des Aides and the Prévôt des Marchands.

=== 17th century ===
Poverty continued to be widespread during the 17th century, and the Hôtel-Dieu offered an opportunity for many of the bourgeois and nobility to come to the aid of the poor. Nevertheless, conditions in the hospital remained horrendous and overcrowding continued to be a problem, with daily patient numbers ranging from 2000 to 4000. Hundreds of hospital staff were also lodged there.

Although the Hôtel-Dieu was a large hospital, poverty, conflict and disease engendered high demand for its services. During the Fronde, patient admissions were so high that the canopies of the beds were used for the most valid patients, allowing as many as 14 patients to be placed in a single bed. Numerous episodes of the plague carried away thousands of patients and hospital workers, including 17 Sisters of Saint Augustine, the order of nuns charged with patient care at the Hôtel-Dieu. Later in the century, hospital-derived scurvy, which was thought to be a communicable disease at the time, killed as many as 97% of the patients suffering from it. In 1670 alone, 250 patients suffered from scurvy.

The serious problems of overcrowding were recognised at the time and steps were taken to address them. In 1602, Marie de' Medici, second wife of Henry IV, brought five brothers of the Congregation of Saint-Jean-de-Dieu to found the Hôpital de la Charité. Shortly thereafter, Henry IV founded the Hôpital Saint-Louis to unclog the Hôtel-Dieu during the plague epidemic in 1605-1606.

The Hôtel-Dieu enjoyed some tax privileges. On August 5, 1626, it was authorized to build, at its own expense, a stone bridge over the southern arm of the Seine, upstream from the Petit-Pont. Hospital wards were built on top of the bridge. A decree of the Council of State of April 24, 1634 created a toll of a double denier for each man on foot, with revenues going to the hospital. This toll gave the bridge its name — the Pont au Double — and it survived until 1789. The hospital wards surmounting the bridge were a major source of pollution in the Seine.

Hospitals took the name of "Hôpital Général" (General hospital) or "Hôpital d'enfermement" (Asylum), of which the Hôtel-Dieu was one. The centralized approach to extreme poverty in France was based on the premise that medical care was a right for those without family or income, and formalized the admission process to attempt to mitigate overcrowding and unsanitary conditions. The Lieutenant Général de Police became a member of the Bureau de l'Hôtel-Dieu de Paris (Bureau for the Hôtel-Dieu in Paris) in 1690.

=== 18th century ===
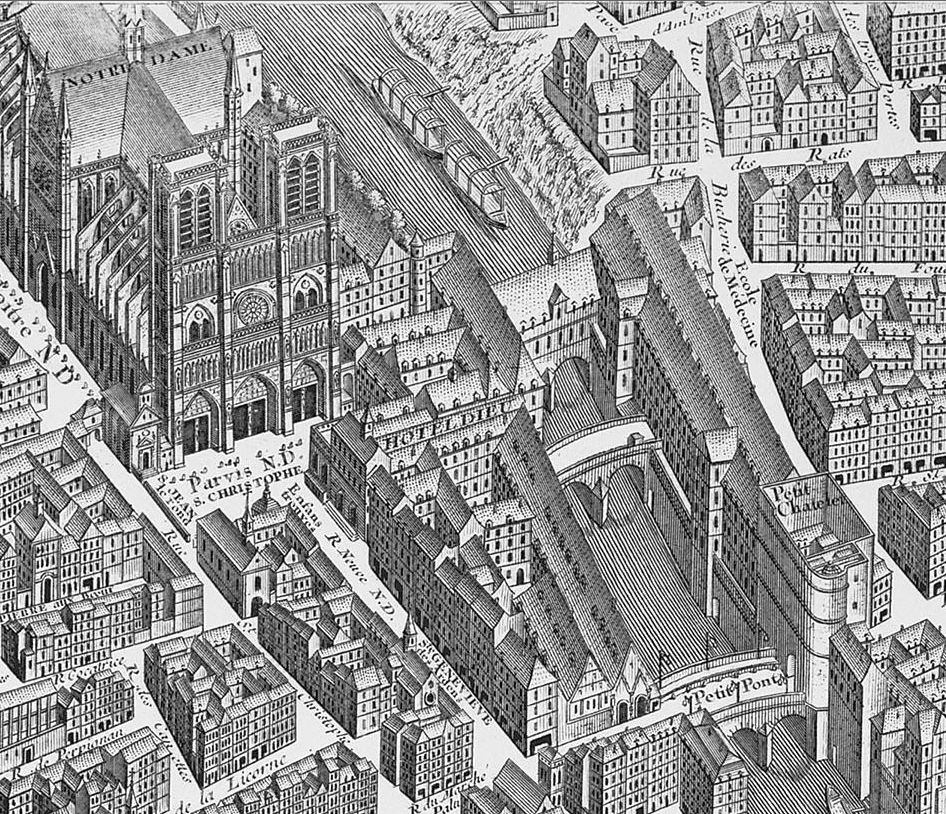
Old Hôtel-Dieu on the Turgot map of Paris

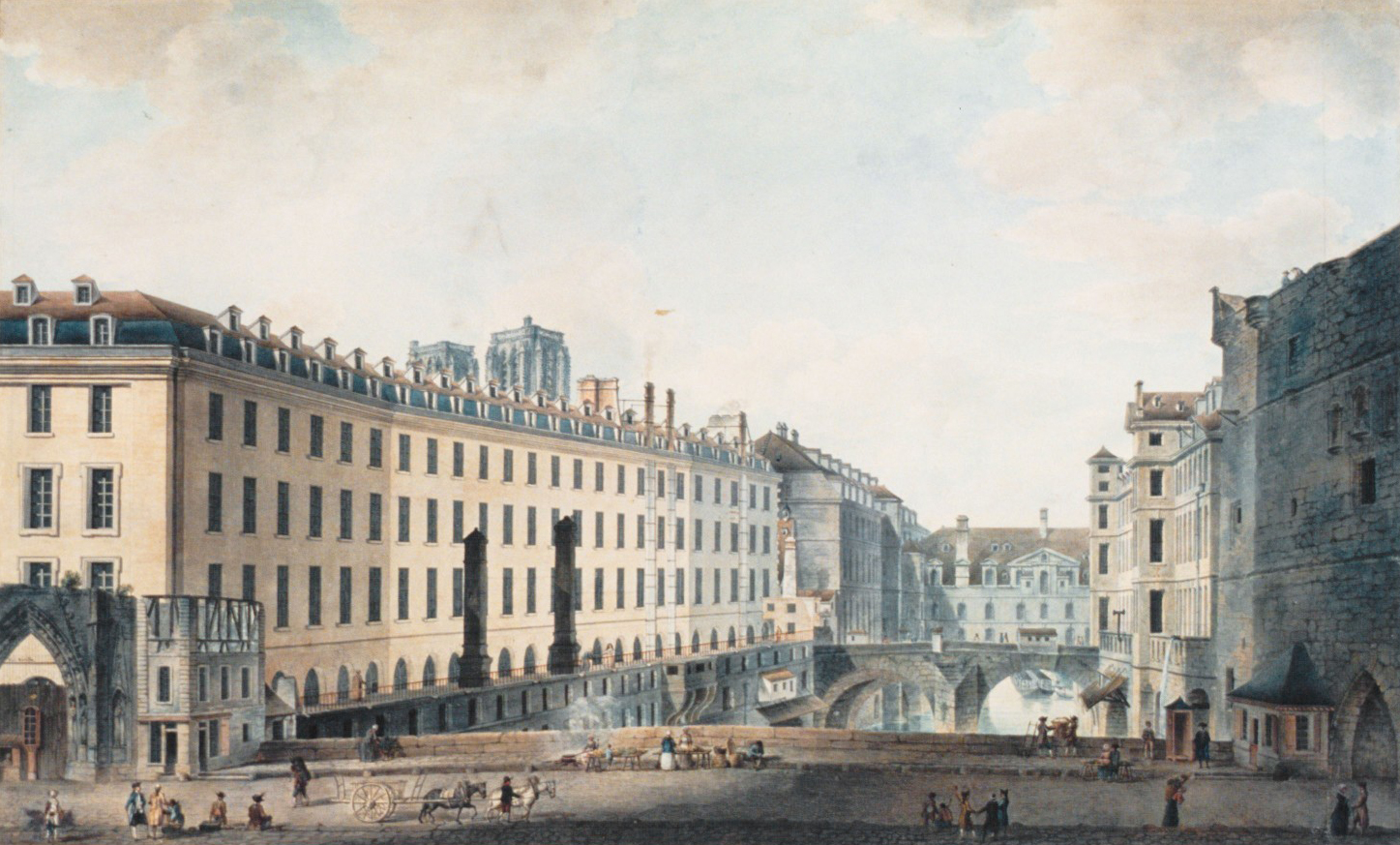
Painting by Victor-Jean Nicolle

The problem of overcrowding continued into the 18th century. Although almost 50 hospitals and similar institutions were operating in Paris by the second half of the century, demand outpaced the supply of medical services, largely because of very rapid growth of both population and poverty. According to a census of 1791, Paris had a population of 118,884 indigents out of a total population of 650,000.

==== The Hôtel-Dieu's bad reputation ====
As always, overcrowding was accompanied by poor outcomes — including hospital-derived infections and high mortality rates. The hospital statistics developed later suggest that the Hôtel-Dieu's record was worse than that of other Parisian institutions. In his Encyclopédie of 1765, Denis Diderot stated that the Hôtel-Dieu was "the largest, the most numerous, the richest and the most dreadful of any of our hospitals." Similarly, Jacques Tenon, an influential anatomist and surgeon, stated in his Mémoires sur les hôpitaux de Paris (1788) that the Hôtel-Dieu was "the most unhealthy and uncomfortable of all hospitals", with a mortality rate of almost 25 percent, which, he noted, was much higher than the rates of other Parisian hospitals.

The Hôtel-Dieu continued to be a place that only patients who could not afford something better would go to. Its 1,200 beds were completely inadequate for housing its daily average of 3,500 patients. Women gave birth in shared beds and the average maternity stay was 35 days, mainly because of the time needed to recover from infections contracted in the maternity wards, including epidemics of puerperal fever. In-hospital epidemics of typhus and smallpox were also common. As in earlier centuries, there was insufficient effective separation of patients with communicable diseases, though the hospital was divided into wards.

==== Official enquiry is launched ====
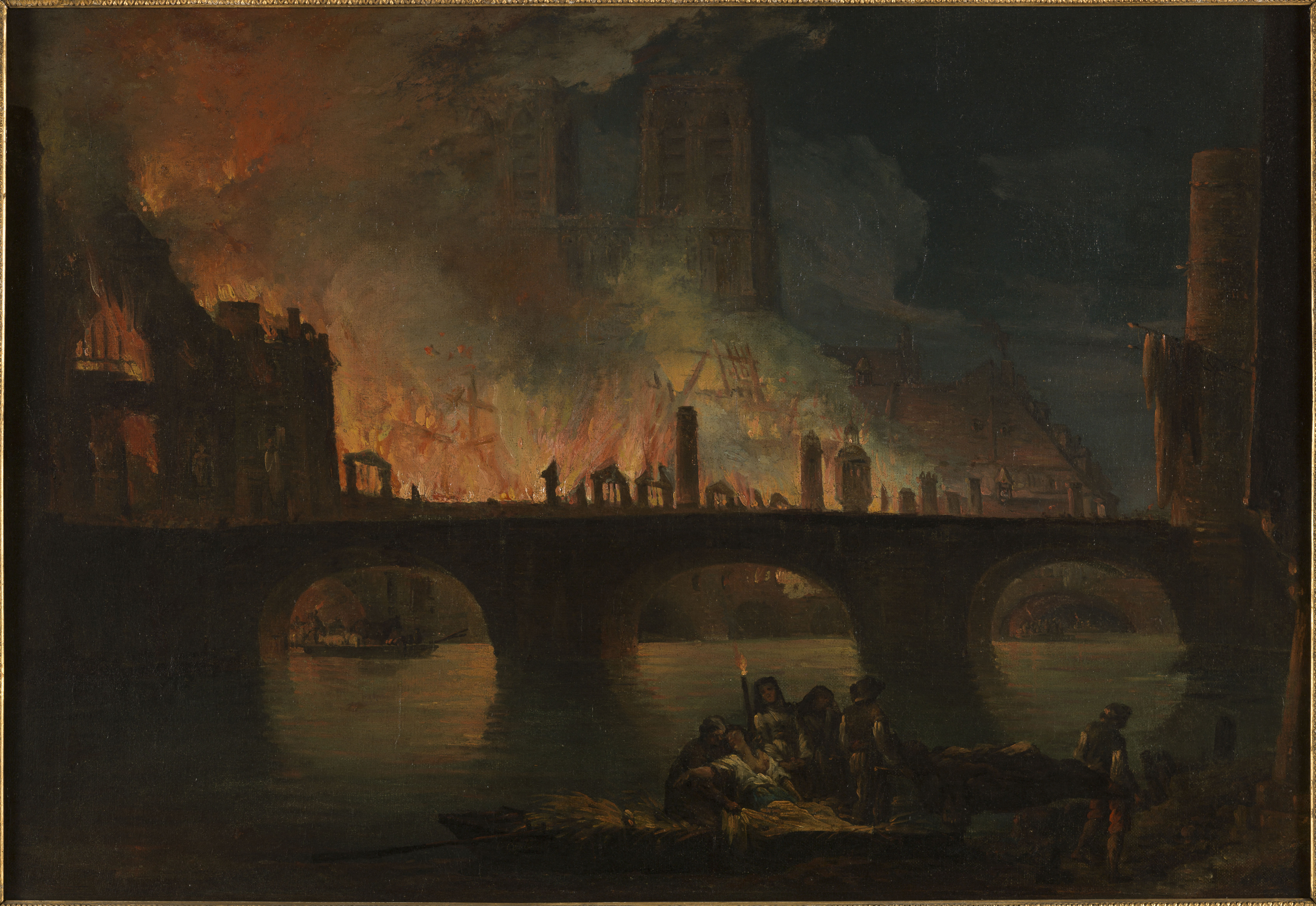
The fire of the Hôtel-Dieu in 1772, depicted by Jean-Baptiste-François Génillion

Two serious fires occurred in 1737 and 1772. The 1772 fire destroyed a large part of the Hôtel-Dieu and killed many patients. Public outrage at the loss of life amplified ongoing public debate about what was to be done with the hospital, a debate that naturally evolved into broader discussions of possible reforms to Paris' hospital system. Louis XV ordered the demolition of the Hôtel-Dieu in 1773 after hearing of its poor patient conditions. However, the execution of the order was delayed due to the King's death.

In 1785, the project of the architect Bernard Poyet (1742-1824) was presented in a memoir entitled "On the need to transfer and rebuild the Hôtel-Dieu." Poyet proposed to build a circular hospital on an island on the Seine. Its exterior was to be a replica of the Colosseum in Rome and it was to house over 5,000 beds and an efficient system of air circulation (constant renewal of the air).

The Baron de Breteuil (1730-1807), acting for Louis XVI, instructed the Royal Academy of Sciences to evaluate the Poyet project. For this purpose, a hospital commission of 9 members was established. Members included Jacques Tenon (1724-1816) as well as other renowned scientists such as Antoine-Laurent de Lavoisier (1743–1794), Charles-Augustin de Coulomb (1736–1806), and Pierre-Simon Laplace (1749–1827).

The ensuing analysis of the Hôtel-Dieu and other Parisian hospitals was transformed into a productive discussion about broader reform of Paris's hospital system. The commission published three consecutive reports. The 1786 report concluded that the situation of the Hôtel-Dieu was irremediable and that the hospital should be moved outside of Paris. The 1787 report recommended that the Hôtel-Dieu be dismantled and that four smaller hospitals be established in various locations around Paris. The 1788 proposed that the pavilion-style of hospital be adopted, with each ward occupying a separate building to reduce disease transmission and to facilitate ventilation. The third report drew heavily on information collected by Tenon and Coulomb during their official study mission to England in the summer of 1787, during which they visited 52 hospitals, prisons and workhouses.

==== Publication of Tenon's Memoir ====
At the request of the hospital commission Tenon published his 500-page Mémoires sur les hôpitaux de Paris, which documented in detail the scandalous conditions in the Hôtel-Dieu. The Memoires criticized virtually everything about the hospital: the space, the circulation, the arrangement of the beds, the number and the mixture of the sick, the dirtiness, the rot and the bad smells, inhumanity and mortality. He notes that one in 15 mothers died in the Hôtel-Dieu's maternity ward, compared to one in 128 in Manchester. Thus, Tenon's publication, combined with the work of the Academy, provided convincing scientific evidence in support of the Parisian's long standing prejudices against the Hôtel-Dieu.

The Memoir went further by also setting a complete agenda for the reform of hospitals. The agenda covered all aspects of hospital practice including hospital architecture and grounds, furnishing of wards, management and qualifications of staff, publication of reports on hospital outcomes and finances, as well as the keeping of individual patient charts and case histories. Tenon's Memoir would influence European and American hospital practice for at least a century.

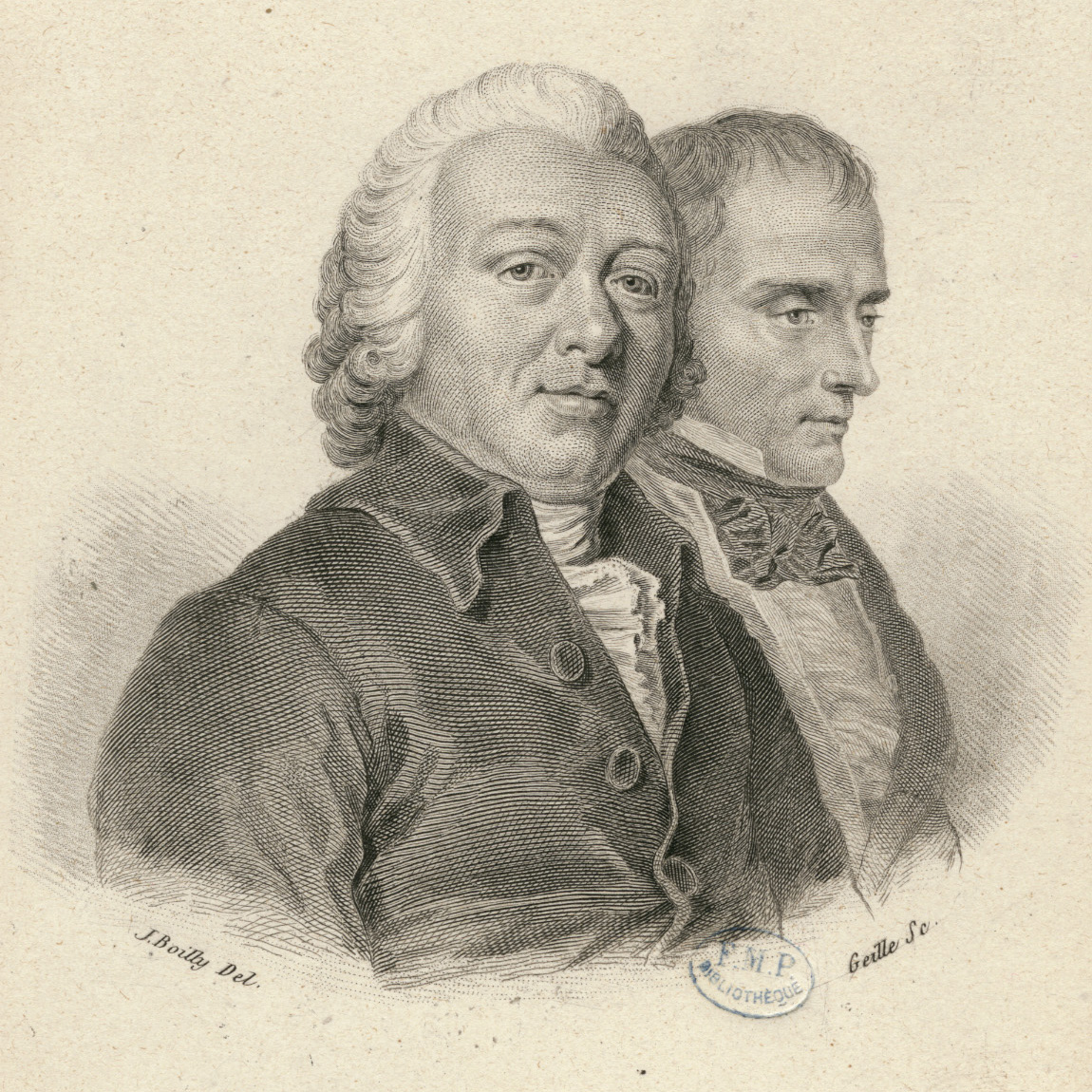
Pierre-Joseph Desault and Xavier Bichat

In 1787, the Hôtel-Dieu implemented a code of medical services that transformed the hospital from a charitable establishment run by religious orders to a medical and surgical establishment run by doctors. Jacques Necker created the positions of Inspecteur général des hôpitaux civils et des maisons de force (General Inspector for civil hospitals and jails) and Commissaire du roi pour tout ce qui a trait aux hôpitaux (Royal Commissioner for all that relates to hospitals). The use of hospitals as teaching institutions was also reinforced as part of the reform movement, which studied medical practice and policy in other European countries. The Hôtel-Dieu achieved renown as a surgical training institution with the appointment of Pierre-Joseph Desault as chef de service in 1785. Desault established a successful educational clinic for surgical interns to supplement what had previously been limited to academic training.

Generally, though, the progress anticipated by the reform movement initiated under the last of the French kings was hampered by the massive changes that were occurring in broader French society during the French Revolution. Major reforms to the system of government itself needed to take place before the narrower reforms to the Parisian medical system could receive fuller attention.

=== 19th century ===
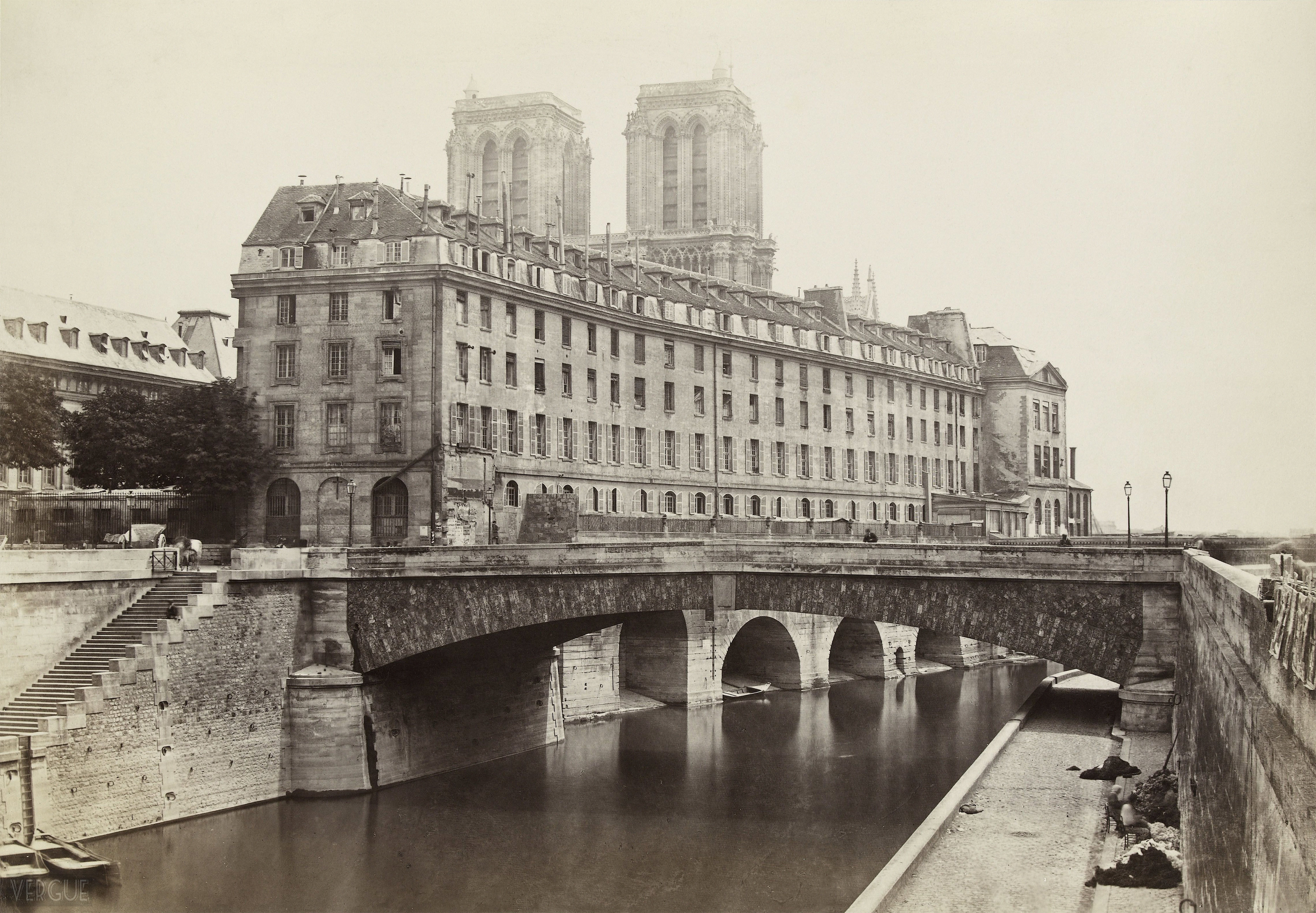
The old Hôtel-Dieu between 1865 and 1868

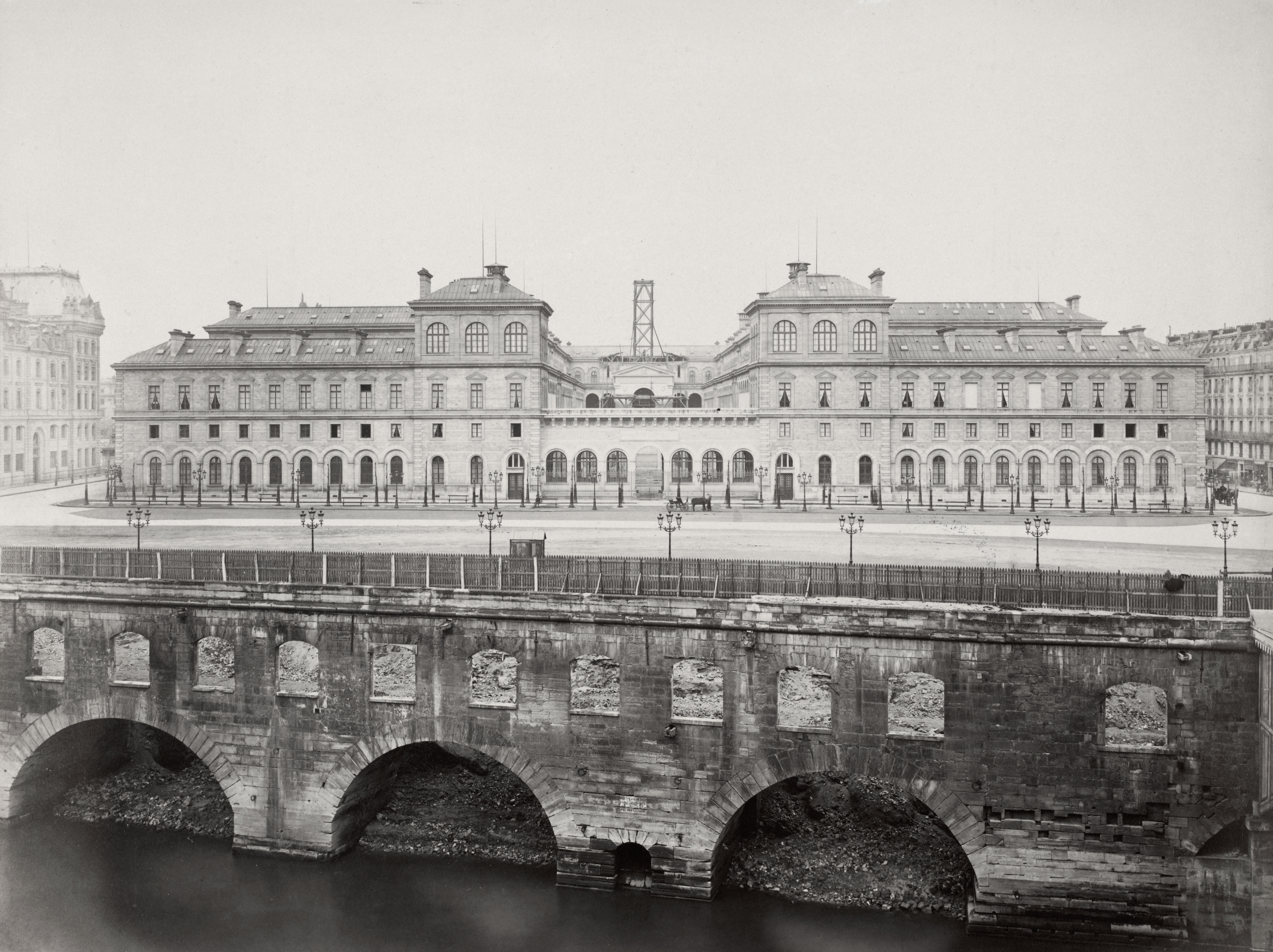
Haussman's Hôtel-Dieu, circa 1875

By the 19th century, hospitals were playing a central role in medical instruction and research. Xavier Bichat, a pupil of Desault, expounded on his new "membrane theory" during a course taught in 1801–1802 at the Hôtel-Dieu.

In 1801, the Parisian hospitals adopted a new administrative framework: the Conseil général des hôpitaux et hospices civils de Paris (General Council for Parisian hospitals and civil hospices). The objective of improving hospital management brought about the creation of new services: the Bureau d'admission (Admissions office) and the Pharmacie centrale (Central Pharmacy). Napoleon I finally rebuilt the portions of the Hôtel-Dieu that were destroyed in the fire of 1772.

Also during this period, the Hôtel-Dieu advocated the practice of vaccination, of which Duc de La Rochefoucauld-Liancourt was a fervent supporter. Similarly, the discoveries of René-Théophile-Hyacinthe Laennec permitted the refinement of methods of diagnosis, auscultation, and aetiology of illnesses.

The Pont au Double was demolished in 1847 and rebuilt without covering.

The Hôtel-Dieu was rebuilt between 1867 and 1878 on the opposite side of the parvise of Notre Dame, as part of Haussmann's renovation of Paris commissioned by Napoleon III. The reconstruction followed plans by architects Émile Jacques Gilbert and Arthur-Stanislas Diet.

It was not until 1908 that the Augustinian nuns left the Hôtel-Dieu for good.

== Role within the current hospital system of Paris ==
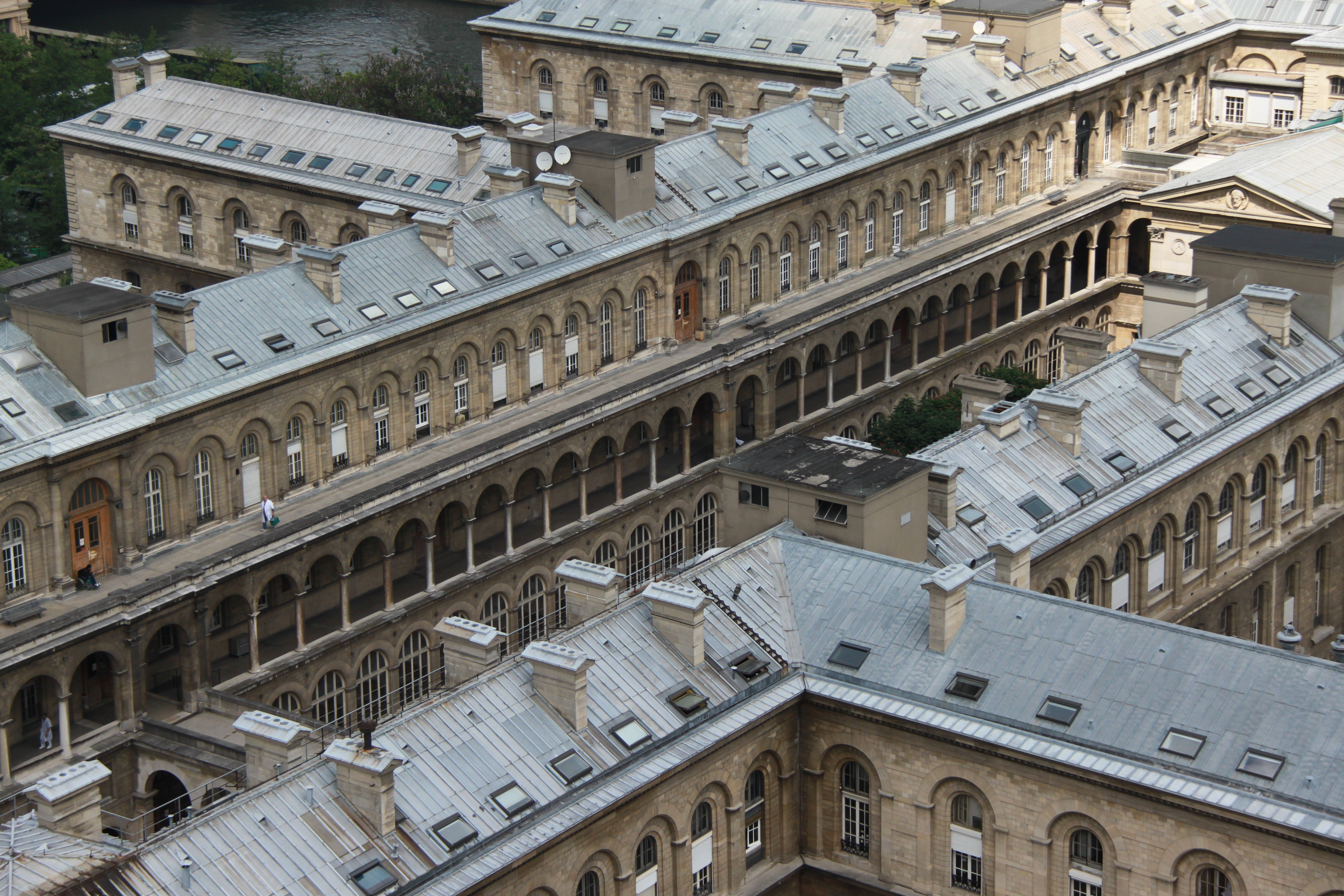
View from Notre-Dame de Paris

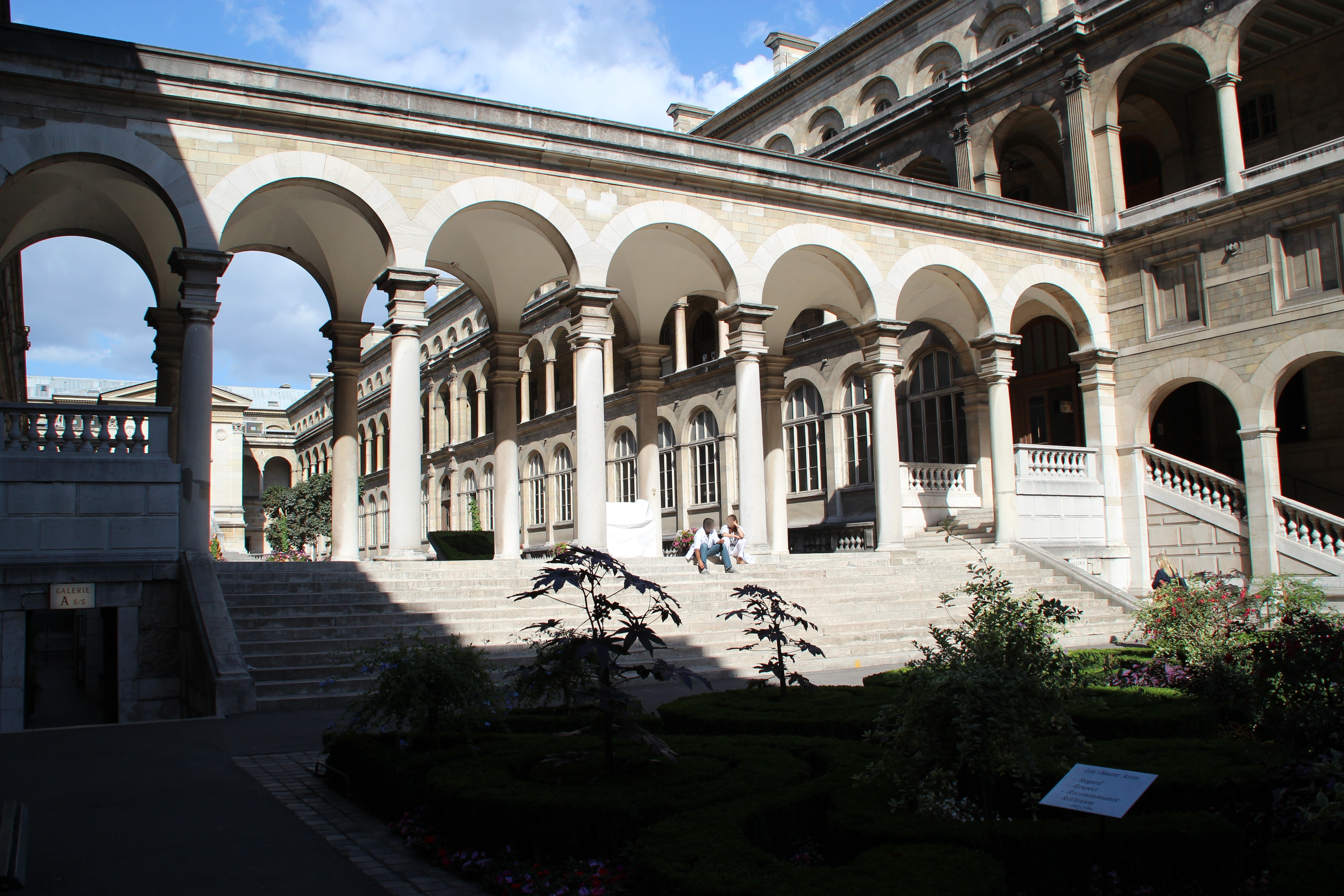

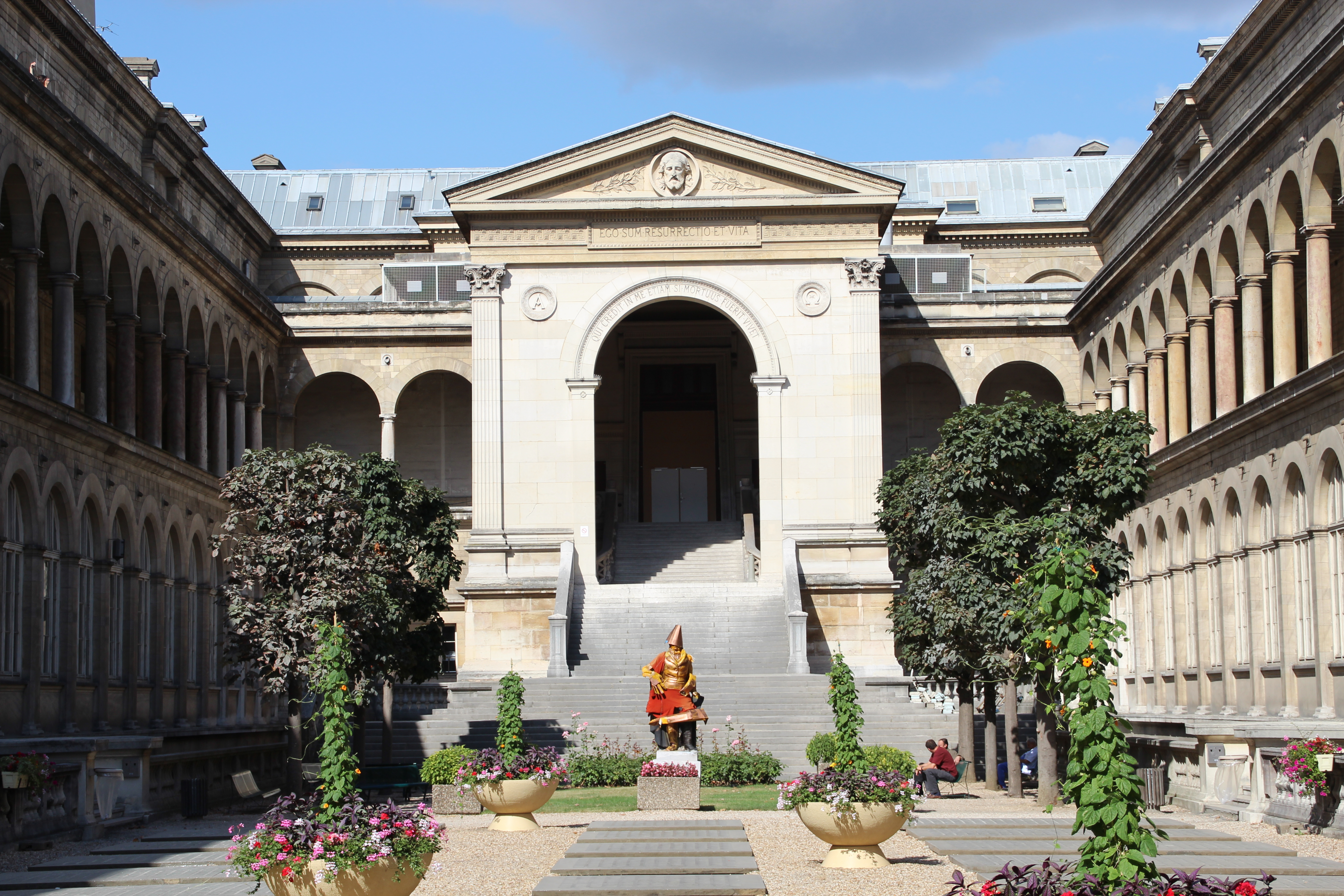

The Hôtel-Dieu is the top casualty centre for dealing with emergency cases for parts of central Paris. Indeed, it is the only emergency centre for the first nine arrondissements and is the local centre for the first four.

For the last 50 years, it has been home to the diabetes and endocrine illnesses clinical department. It deals almost exclusively with the screening, treatment and prevention of the complications associated with diabetes mellitus. It is also a referral service for hypoglycemia. Oriented towards informing the patient (therapeutic education) and technological innovation, it offers a selection of care facilities for all levels of complications. It is also at the forefront of diabetes research in such areas as new insulins and drugs, the effects of nutrition, external and implanted pumps, glucose sensors and artificial pancreas.

More recently, a major department for ophthalmology (emergencies, surgery and research) has been developed at the Hôtel-Dieu, under the supervision of Yves Pouliquen.

== Notable figures ==
In 1748, Hyacinthe Théodore Baron, dean of the Faculty of Medicine in Paris from 1750 to 1753 and member of the Academy of Sciences, practised at this hospital.

Other notable physicians, researchers, and surgeons who practised at the hospital include Jean Méry, Forlenze, Bichat, Dupuytren, Adrien Proust, Hartmann, Desault, Récamier, Dieulafoy, Trousseau, Ambroise Paré, Marc Tiffeneau, Augustin Gilbert.
