= Baragiano =

- Comune
- Comune di Baragiano
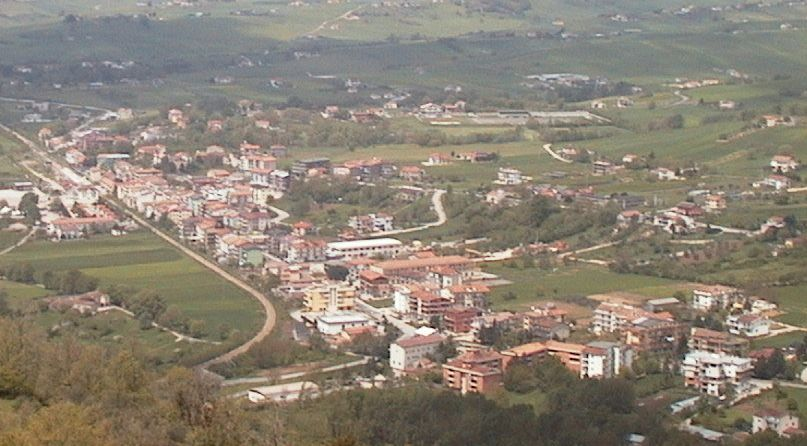
- View of Baragiano

- Location within Italy Location within Basilicata
- Coordinates: 40°41′N 15°36′E
- Country: Italy
- Region: Basilicata
- Province: Potenza (PZ)
- Frazioni: Baragiano Scalo, Franciosa, Giubizzi Nocenzullo, Martino Nero, San Giorgio Isca della Botte, Serra Pelina

Government
  - Mayor: Giuseppe Fernando Galizia since 12-6-2022

Area
  - Total: 29 km^{2} (11 sq mi)
- Elevation: 624 m (2,047 ft)

Population (31 December 2006)
  - Total: 2,737
  - Density: 94/km^{2} (240/sq mi)
- Demonym: Baragianesi
- Time zone: UTC+1 (CET)
  - Summer (DST): UTC+2 (CEST)
- Postal code: 85050
- Dialing code: 0971
- ISTAT code: 076010
- Patron saint: St. Roch
- Saint day: August 16
- Website: Official website

Baragiano (Lucano: Varagiàne) is a town and comune in the province of Potenza, in the Southern Italian region of Basilicata. It is bounded by the comuni of Balvano, Bella, Picerno, Ruoti.

== Twin towns ==
- Jalasjärvi, Finland
