= Hyacinthe Théodore Baron =

French military physician

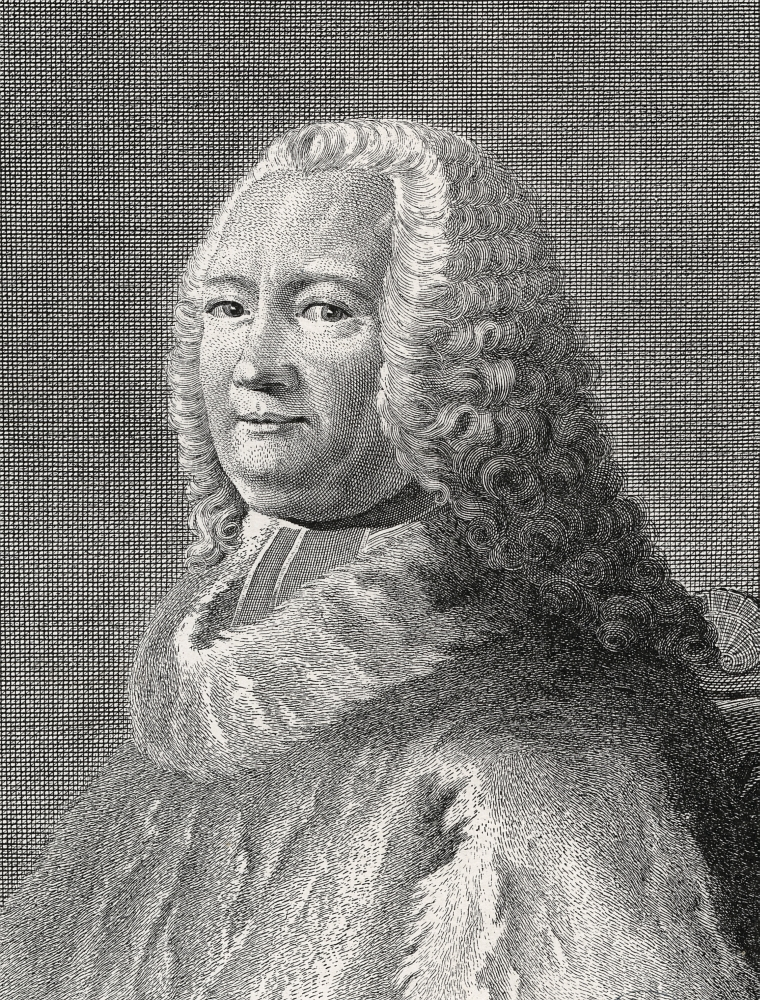
- Born: 12 August 1707; Paris (France)
- Died: 27 March 1787 (aged 79); Paris (France)
- Burial place: Prieuré royal de Saint-Louis de la Couture; 48°51′15″N 2°21′37″E
- Education: Faculty of Medicine in Paris
- Occupations: Military physician, bibliophile
- Parents: Hyacinthe-Théodore Baron (1686–1758) (father); Marie Pellemoine (mother)
- Relatives: Brother of Théodore Baron d'Hénouville (fr)

Hyacinthe Théodore Baron (born in Paris on 12 August 1707; died on 27 March 1787 in the same city) was a French military physician and a bibliophile.

== Biography ==
Eldest son of Hyacinthe-Théodore Baron (1686–1758), dean of the Faculty of Medicine in Paris in 1730 and of Marie Pellemoine, daughter of a surgeon from Arpajon, Hyacinthe Théodore Baron was born in Paris in 1707. As a student at this Faculty, he passed his medical thesis on 29 October 1732.

In 1739 he was appointed the first doctor in the French army of Marquis de Maillebois sent against the Corsican insurgents to help Genoa to quell the ongoing rebellion and stayed until the end of the troubles and the withdrawal of the troops in 1741.

He was then the first doctor in the French army during the war of the Austrian Succession until the end of 1743, then went to Italy with the Prince de Conti and the Marshal of Belle-Isle. He returned to Paris after the peace of 1748 and became a doctor at the Hôtel-Dieu in Paris, dean of the Faculty from 1750 to 1753 and member of the Academy of Sciences (1752).

It was known to have an important library. He died in 1787 and is buried in the church of the Prieuré royal de Saint-Louis de la Couture in Paris, where he had been a doctor.

== Works ==
- Codex medicamentarius, seu Pharmacopoea Parisiensis (1732)
- Formules de médicaments dressées à l'usage des hôpitaux de l'armée du roy en Bavière (1742)
- Ritus, usus et laudabiles Facultatis medicinae Parisiensis consuetudines (1751)
- Quæstionum medicarum, quæ circa medicinæ theoriam et praxim, ante duo sæcula, in scholis facultatis medicinæ Parisiensis, agitatæ sunt & discussæ, series chronologica (1752)
- Rapport fait à l'Académie royale de chirurgie, sur les nouveaux bains médicinaux (1752)
- Mémoires pour servir à l'approvisionnement des hôpitaux ambulants des armées du roi et des citadelles menacées d'être investies ou assiégées (1758)
- Consultation contre la légitimité des naissances prétendues tardives (1764)
