= Professed House (Paris) =

Coordinates: 48.8542°N 2.3603°E

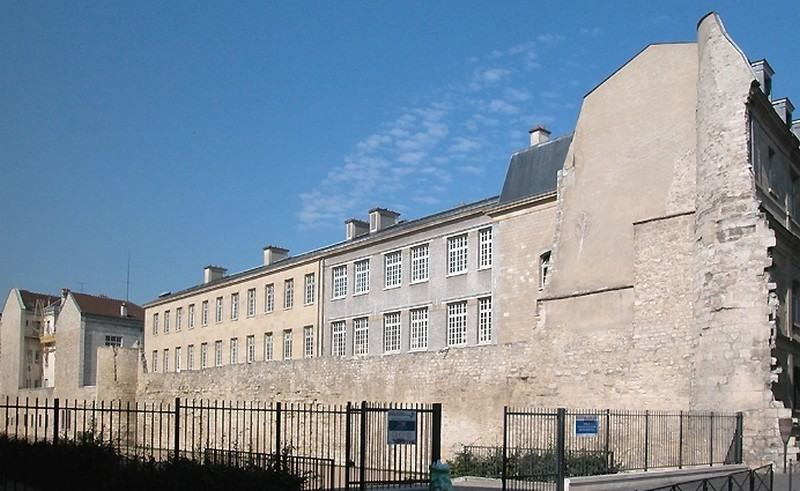
The present-day lycée Charlemagne.

The Professed House was a Jesuit professed house in Paris, built on the rue Saint-Antoine in Le Marais. Its site between rue Saint-Paul, rue Saint-Antoine and rue Charlemagne are now occupied by the lycée Charlemagne. It welcomed theologians and scientists and was in a quarter lived in by the nobility. The église Saint-Louis (now église Saint-Paul-Saint-Louis) was built nearby.

== History ==
In 1580, cardinal de Bourbon bought the hôtel de La Rochepot from duchesse de Montmorency and gave it to the Jesuits, who modified it. Between 1627 and 1647, on the Wall of Philip II Augustus, they built the main building of the professed house. This house was the base for the confessors to the kings of France, including père de La Chaise, confessor to Louis XIV for 34 years, who gave his name to the cimetière du Père-Lachaise (with a spelling error that appeared under Napoleon I). It also housed preachers such as Bourdaloue and Ménestrier, as well as Marc-Antoine Charpentier, music master to the Jesuits.

After the expulsion of the Jesuits under the ministry of the duc de Choiseul, the buildings became deserted in the 1760s. In 1767, the Génovéfains of Sainte-Catherine-du-Val-des-Écoliers bought it for 400,000 livres and renamed it the "Prieuré royal de Saint-Louis de la Couture" ("Royal Priory of Saint Louis of Couture") - they owned the biggest library in Paris.

Hyacinthe Théodore Baron was the physician of this priory and was buried there in 1787.
