= Avigliano =

- Comune
- Comune di Avigliano
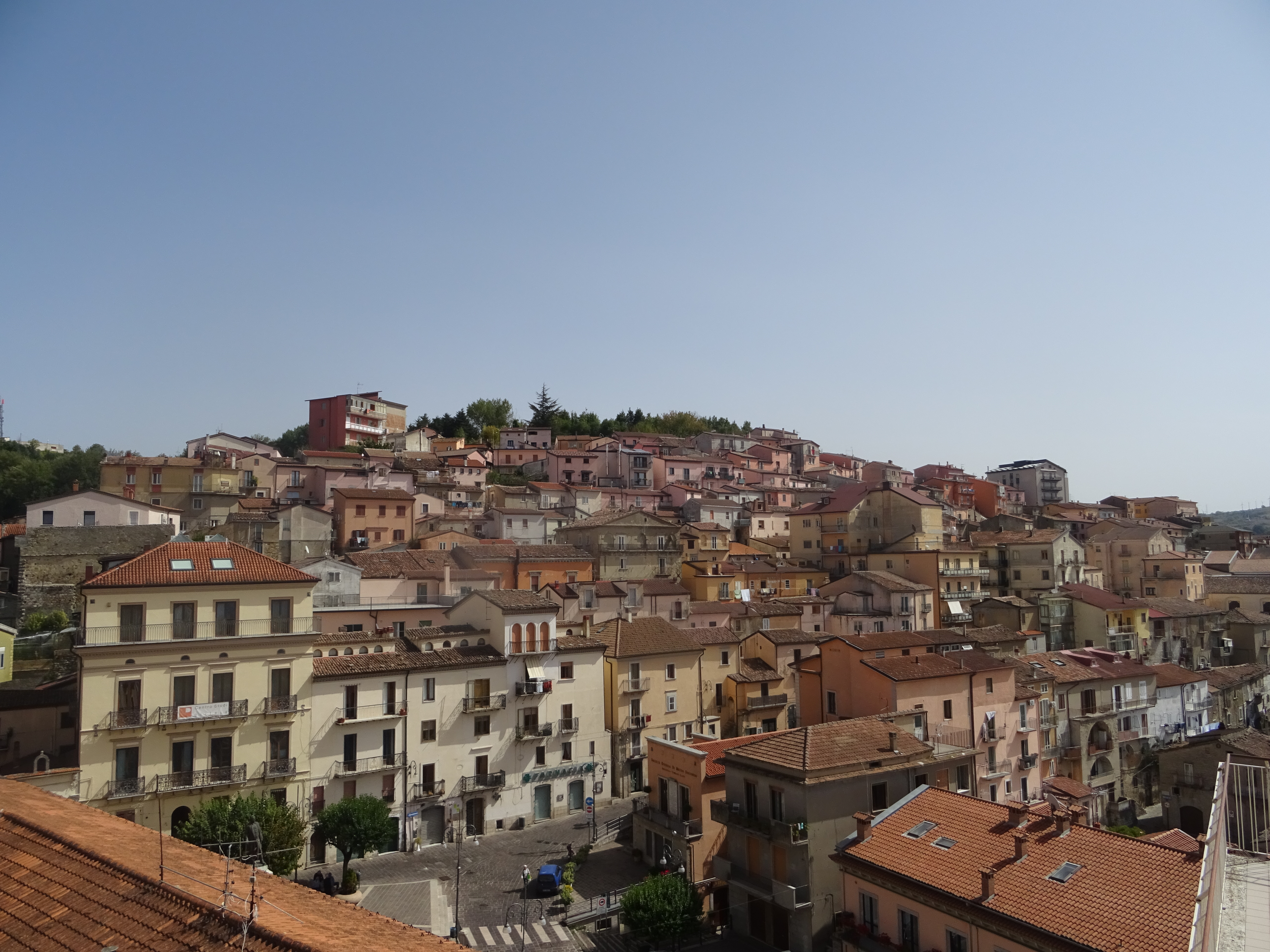
- View of Avigliano

- Coat of arms

- Avigliano within the Province of Potenza

- Location of Avigliano in Italy Avigliano (Basilicata)
- Coordinates: 40°43′53.08″N 15°42′59.72″E
- Country: Italy
- Region: Basilicata
- Province: Potenza (PZ)
- Frazioni: Badia, Bancone di Sopra, Bancone di Sotto, Bruciate di Sopra, Bruciate di Sotto, Bufolaria, Canarra, Canestrelle, Carpinelli, Cascia, Castel Lagopesole, Cerza Montanara, Chicone, Ciccolecchia, Contrada Cefalo, Frusci, Gallicchio, Gianturco di Sant'Angelo, Giardiniera Inferiore, Giardiniera Superiore, Lacciola, Lazzi e Spilli, Limitone, Masi, Masseria Bozzelli, Masseria Nardella, Mezzomiero, Miracolo, Moccaro, Montemarcone Alto, Montemarcone Basso, Pantani, Paoladoce, Patacca, Piano del Conte, Piano del Lago, Possidente, Riseca Don Ciccio, Salinas, Sant'Angelo, Sarachelle, Sarnelli, Sassano, Sceppi, Signore, Spinamara, Stagliuozzo, Stolfi, Torretta, Ualano, Valvano Corbo

Government
  - Mayor: Giuseppe Mecca

Area
  - Total: 84.93 km^{2} (32.79 sq mi)
- Elevation: 827 m (2,713 ft)

Population (1 January 2023)
  - Total: 10,614
  - Density: 125.0/km^{2} (323.7/sq mi)
- Demonym: Aviglianesi
- Time zone: UTC+1 (CET)
  - Summer (DST): UTC+2 (CEST)
- Postal code: 85021
- Dialing code: 0971
- ISTAT code: 076007
- Patron saint: St. Vitus
- Saint day: 15 June
- Website: Official website

Avigliano (Lucano: Avigliàne) is a town and comune in the province of Potenza, in the southern Italian region of Basilicata.

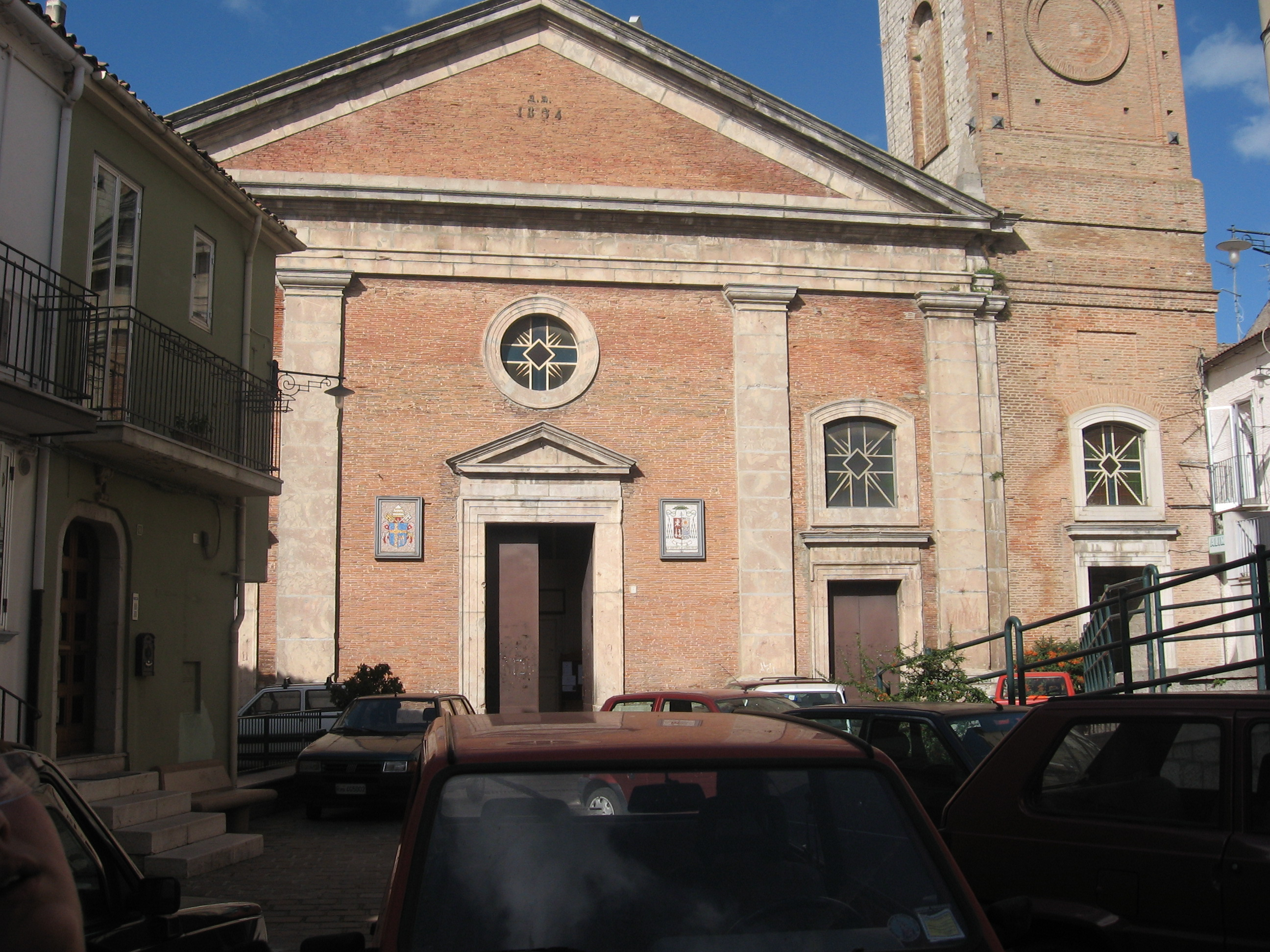
Basilica of Santa Maria del Carmine.

== Geography ==
=== Overview ===
The area surrounding Avigliano is considered mountainous with elevations varying between 550 and 1,239 metres (1,804 and 4,065 ft). Town's is at an elevation of 857 metres (2,812 ft).

Avigliano is surrounded by numerous peaks of various heights:

- Mount Caruso, 1,239 meters (4064 feet)
- Mount Carmine, 1,228 meters (4029 feet)
- Mount Saint Angelo, 1,121 meters (3678 feet)
- Montalto (High Mountain), 938 meters (3077 feet)
- Mount Marcone, 857 meters (2812 feet)

The municipality is bounded by the comuni of Atella, Bella, Filiano, Forenza, Pietragalla, Potenza and Ruoti.

=== Frazioni ===
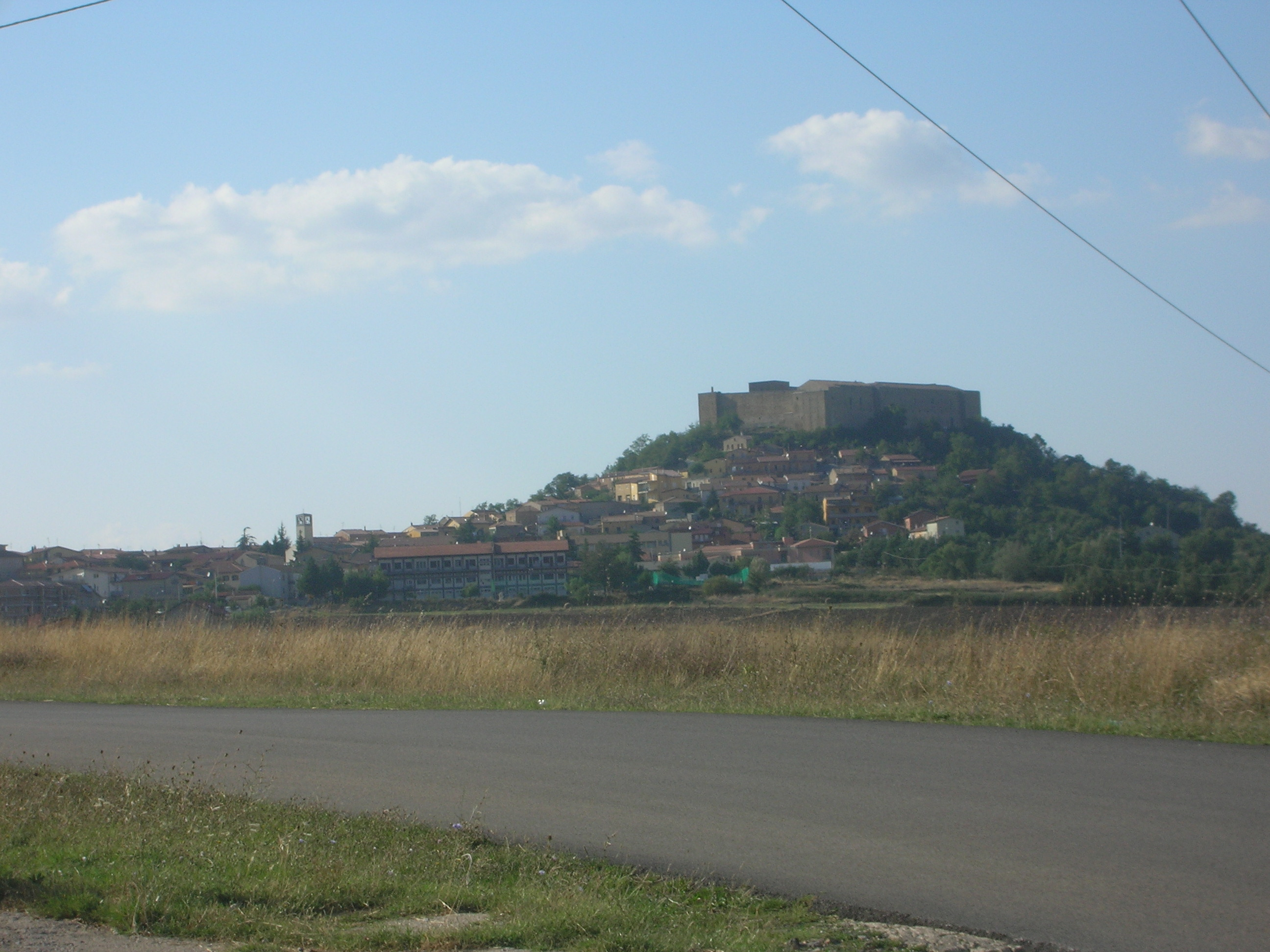
View of Castel Lagopesole.

Castel Lagopesole has a population of 652. It is home to a large castle, built by the Saracens. Later it was expanded by the Normans and was a hunter mansion for Frederick II of Hohenstaufen and a summer residence for the Angevin kings of Naples. During the brigand age of southern Italy, the castle was captured by Carmine Crocco (1861) and used as his base.

The other municipal frazioni are the villages and localities of Badia, Bancone di Sopra, Bancone di Sotto, Bruciate di Sopra, Bruciate di Sotto, Bufolaria (or Bufalaria), Canarra, Canestrelle, Carpinelli, Cascia, Cerza Montanara, Chicone, Ciccolecchia, Contrada Cefalo, Frusci, Gallicchio, Gianturco di Sant'Angelo, Giardiniera Inferiore, Giardiniera Superiore, Lacciola, Lazzi e Spilli, Limitone, Masi, Masseria Bozzelli, Masseria Nardella, Mezzomiero, Miracolo, Moccaro, Montemarcone Alto, Montemarcone Basso, Pantani, Paoladoce, Patacca, Piano del Conte, Piano del Lago, Possidente, Riseca Don Ciccio, Salinas, Sant'Angelo, Sarachelle, Sarnelli, Sassano, Sceppi, Signore, Spinamara, Stagliuozzo, Stolfi, Torretta, Ualano and Valvano Corbo.

=== Climate ===
The mean annual temperature of Avigliano is 12 °C (54 °F). The mean temperature of January is 3.3 °C (37.9 °F), making January the coldest month annually. Conversely, July is the warmest month, with an average temperature of 21.4 °C (70.5 °F). The annual temperature ranges between −12 °C (10 °F) as an annual low to an annual high of 38 °C (100 °F).

The mean annual precipitation of Avigliano is 844 millimetres (33.2 in), with a record high of 1,192 millimetres (46.9 in) and low of 679 millimetres (26.7 in).

== History ==
The earliest archaeological and documented reports that confirm the existence of Avigliano go back to Medieval times, but there remain many elaborate theories over the origin of the city. One legend suggests that the center was founded in the 15th century by the Sabellians, who were attracted to the location.

Another legend derives from the origin of the name Avigliano from the Latin Avis locum, which is "place of the fowl", a name given to the area by a group of sailors from the East.

== Transport ==
The route Avigliano Città-Avigliano of Avigliano-Altamura railway counts the stations of Avigliano Città (in the town's centre), Moccaro (in the homonym hamlet) and Avigliano Lucania; this one located some km outside the town, at a junction point with Foggia-Potenza line. This route is also part of the Potenza Suburban Railway. Two other villages, Possidente and Castel Lagopesole, have their railway station on Foggia-Potenza line.

== People ==
- Virgilio Canio Corbo (1918–1991), Franciscan friar and archeologist
- Leonard Covello (1887–1982), Italian-born American educator
- Emanuele Gianturco (1857–1907), legal scholar and politician
- Ninco Nanco (1833–1864), brigand
- Giustiniano Palomba (1751–1799), nobleman and lawyer

== Twin towns ==
- Schweinfurt, Germany
