= Bella, Basilicata =

Bella
- Comune
- Comune di Bella
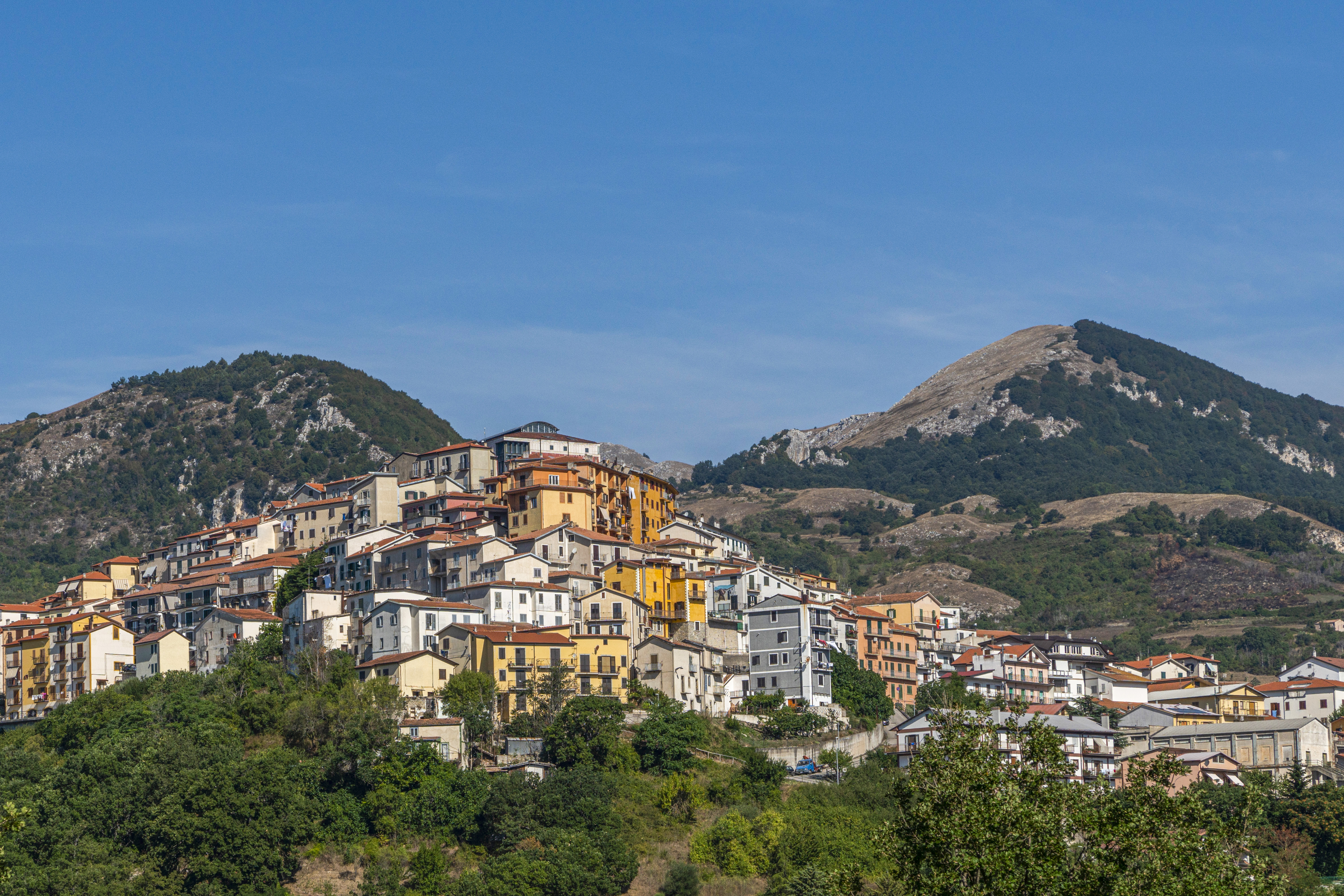
- View of Bella, Basilicata

- Location within Italy Location within Basilicata
- Coordinates: 40°46′N 15°32′E
- Country: Italy
- Region: Basilicata
- Province: Potenza (PZ)
- Frazioni: Scalo Bella-Muro, Re Pupillo, San Cataldo, Sant'Antonio Casalini

Government
  - Mayor: Leonardo Sabato

Area
  - Total: 99.71 km^{2} (38.50 sq mi)

Population (30 April 2017)
  - Total: 5,046
  - Density: 50.61/km^{2} (131.1/sq mi)
- Demonym: Bellesi
- Time zone: UTC+1 (CET)
  - Summer (DST): UTC+2 (CEST)
- Postal code: 85051
- Dialing code: 0976
- ISTAT code: 076012
- Website: Official website

Bella (Lucano: L'Abbégg') is a town and comune in the province of Potenza, in the southern Italian region of Basilicata. It is bounded by the comuni (municipalities) of Atella, Avigliano, Balvano, Baragiano, Muro Lucano, Ruoti, and San Fele.
