= Théodore Baron d'Hénouville =

French physician

Theodore Baron d'Henouville
- Born: 17 June 1715
- Died: 10 March 1768 (aged 52)
- Occupations: Physician and chemist

Théodore Baron d'Hénouville (17 June 1715 – 10 March 1768) was a French physician and member of the Royal Academy of Sciences. He was born in Paris, where he also died.

== Biography ==
Théodore Baron d'Hénouville was the son of Hyacinthe-Théodore Baron (1686–1758), doctor of medicine from the Faculty of Medicine of Paris, and Marie Pellemoine. He is the brother of Hyacinthe-Théodore Baron (1707–1787), doctor of medicine. He was educated at the Collège de Beauvais and there followed the philosophy courses of Louis Benet, professor of philosophy at the College of Beauvais, who was replaced after his death by Dominique-François Rivard (1697–1778).

He was appointed assistant chemist at the Royal Academy of Sciences on 25 August 1752.

== Bibliography ==
- Jean-Paul Grandjean de Fouchy, Éloge de M. Baron, in History of the Royal Academy of Sciences – Year 1768, Royal Printing Office, Paris, 1770, p. 134-143
- Baron d'Hénouville (Théodore), in Jean-Eugène Dezeimeris, Charles-Prosper Ollivier, Jacques Raige-Delorme, Historical dictionary of ancient and modern medicine, at Béchet young bookseller, Paris, 1828, volume 1, p. 274-276
