= Ruoti =

- Comune
- Comune di Ruoti
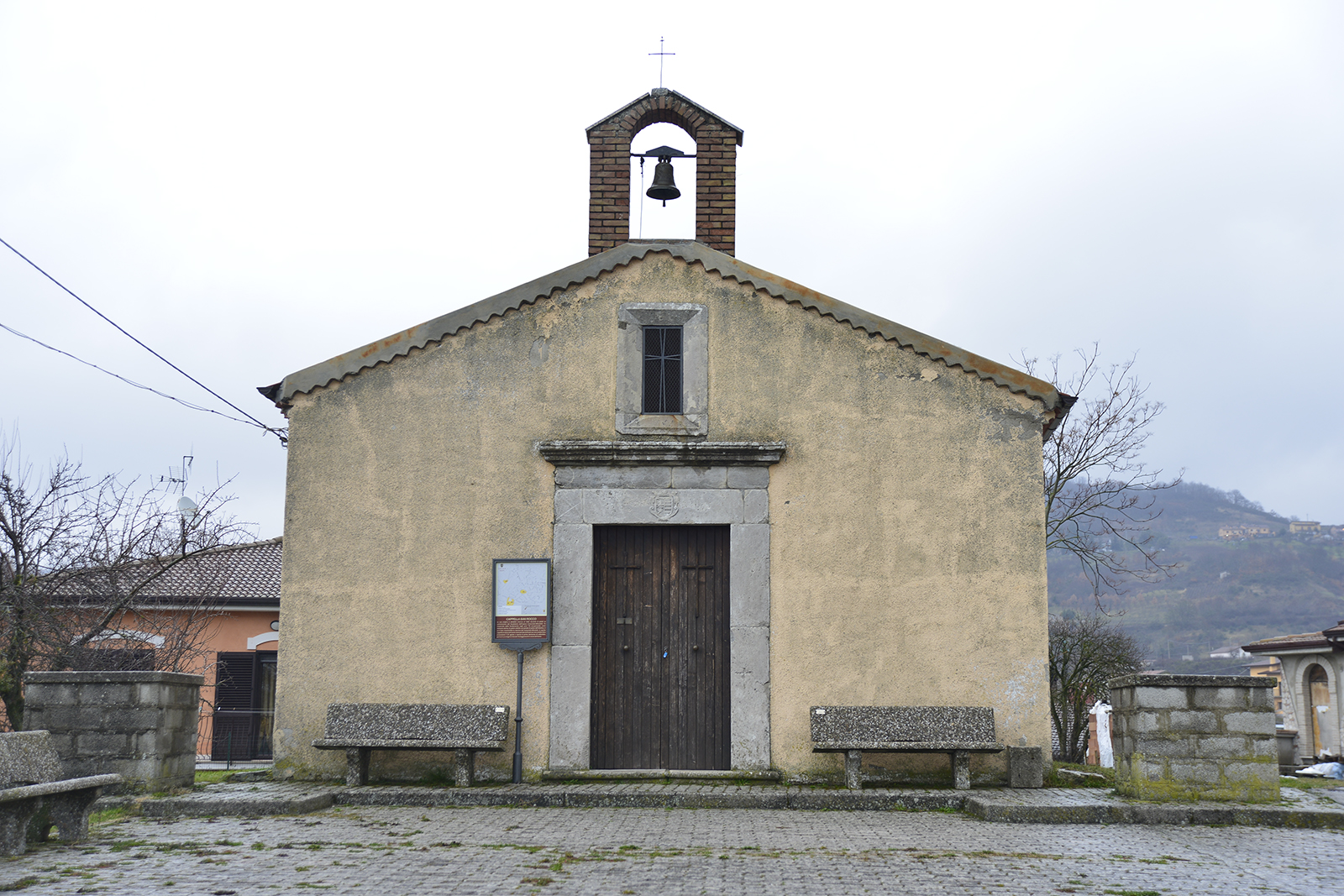
- Church in Ruoti

- Location within Italy Location within Basilicata
- Coordinates: 40°43′N 15°41′E
- Country: Italy
- Region: Basilicata
- Province: Potenza (PZ)

Area
  - Total: 55.06 km^{2} (21.26 sq mi)
- Elevation: 756 m (2,480 ft)

Population (2018-01-01)
  - Total: 3,599
  - Density: 65.37/km^{2} (169.3/sq mi)
- Demonym: Ruotesi
- Time zone: UTC+1 (CET)
  - Summer (DST): UTC+2 (CEST)
- Postal code: 85056
- Dialing code: 0971
- ISTAT code: 076071
- Patron saint: San Donato
- Saint day: 7 August
- Website: Official website

Ruoti (Ruotese: Rùote) is a town and comune in the province of Potenza, in the Basilicata region of southern Italy.

== Geography ==
It is bounded by the comuni of Avigliano, Baragiano, Bella, Picerno, and Potenza.
