= Filiano =

- Comune
- Comune di Filiano
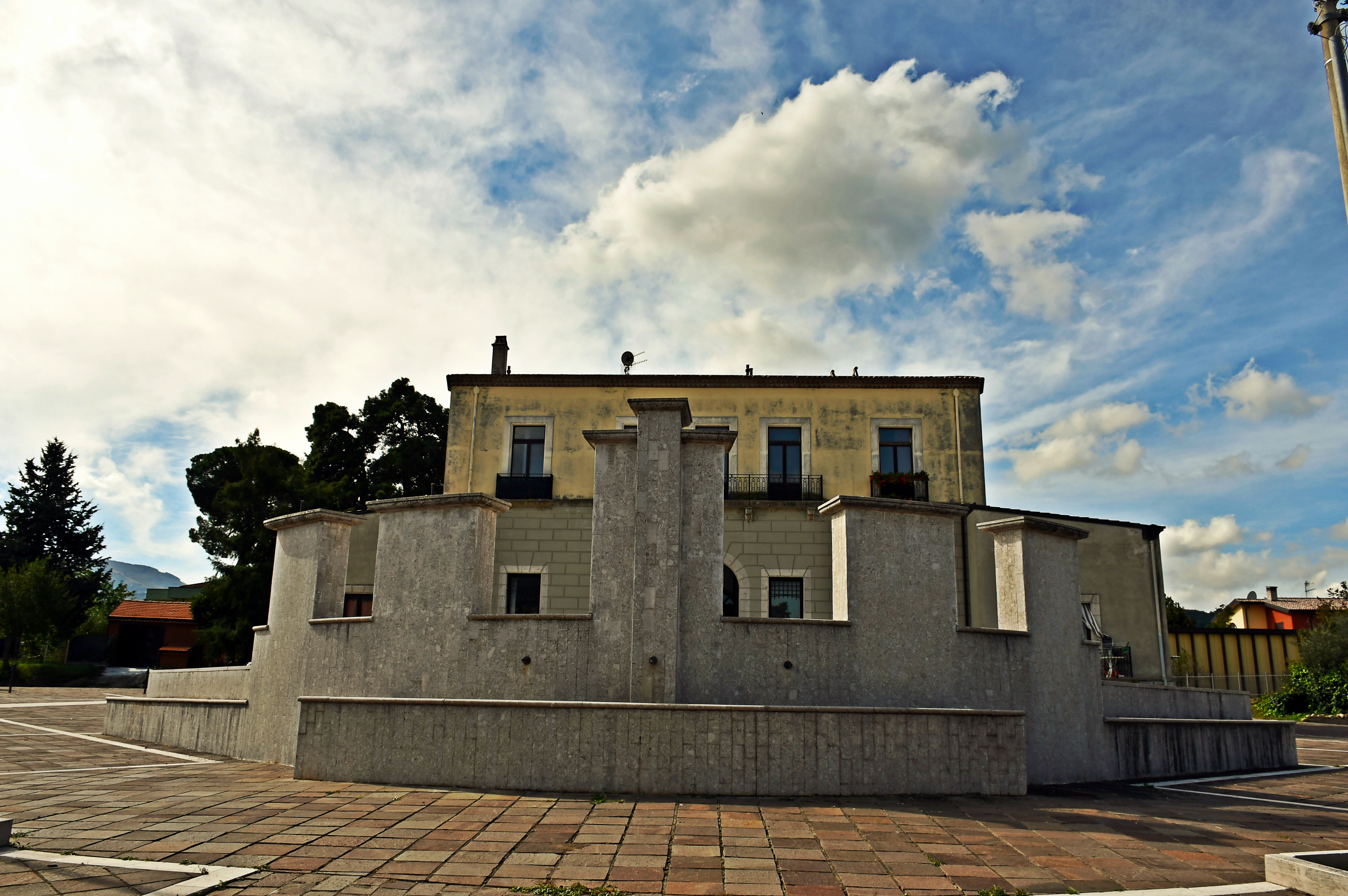
- View of Filiano

- Location within Italy Location within Basilicata
- Coordinates: 40°49′N 15°42′E
- Country: Italy
- Region: Basilicata
- Province: Potenza (PZ)
- Frazioni: Dragonetti, Forenza Scalo, Scalera, Sterpito di Sopra, Sterpito di Sotto, Inforchia, Luponio, Don Ciccio

Government
  - Mayor: Francesco Santoro (Civic List "Democrazia Partecipata")

Area
  - Total: 70 km^{2} (27 sq mi)
- Elevation: 597 m (1,959 ft)

Population (2003)
  - Total: 3,293
  - Density: 47/km^{2} (120/sq mi)
- Demonym: Filianesi
- Time zone: UTC+1 (CET)
  - Summer (DST): UTC+2 (CEST)
- Postal code: 85020
- Dialing code: 0971
- ISTAT code: 076032
- Patron saint: St. Mary of the Rosary
- Saint day: Second Sunday of August
- Website: www.comune.filiano.pz.it

Filiano (Lucano: Filiàne) is a town and comune in the province of Potenza, in the Southern Italian region of Basilicata. It is bounded by the comuni (Municipalities,) of Atella, Avigliano, Forenza, Ripacandida, San Fele. The history of the town starts from the 16th century when the people of Avigliano left the ancient castrum to clear new land in the Vitalba valley, in which many towns were formed, including Filiano. Today, it is noted for its traditional agriculture, local food products, and cultural heritage, with traces of earlier human presence visible in the prehistoric rock art of the Grotta dei Pisconi.
