= Picerno =

- Comune
- Comune di Picerno
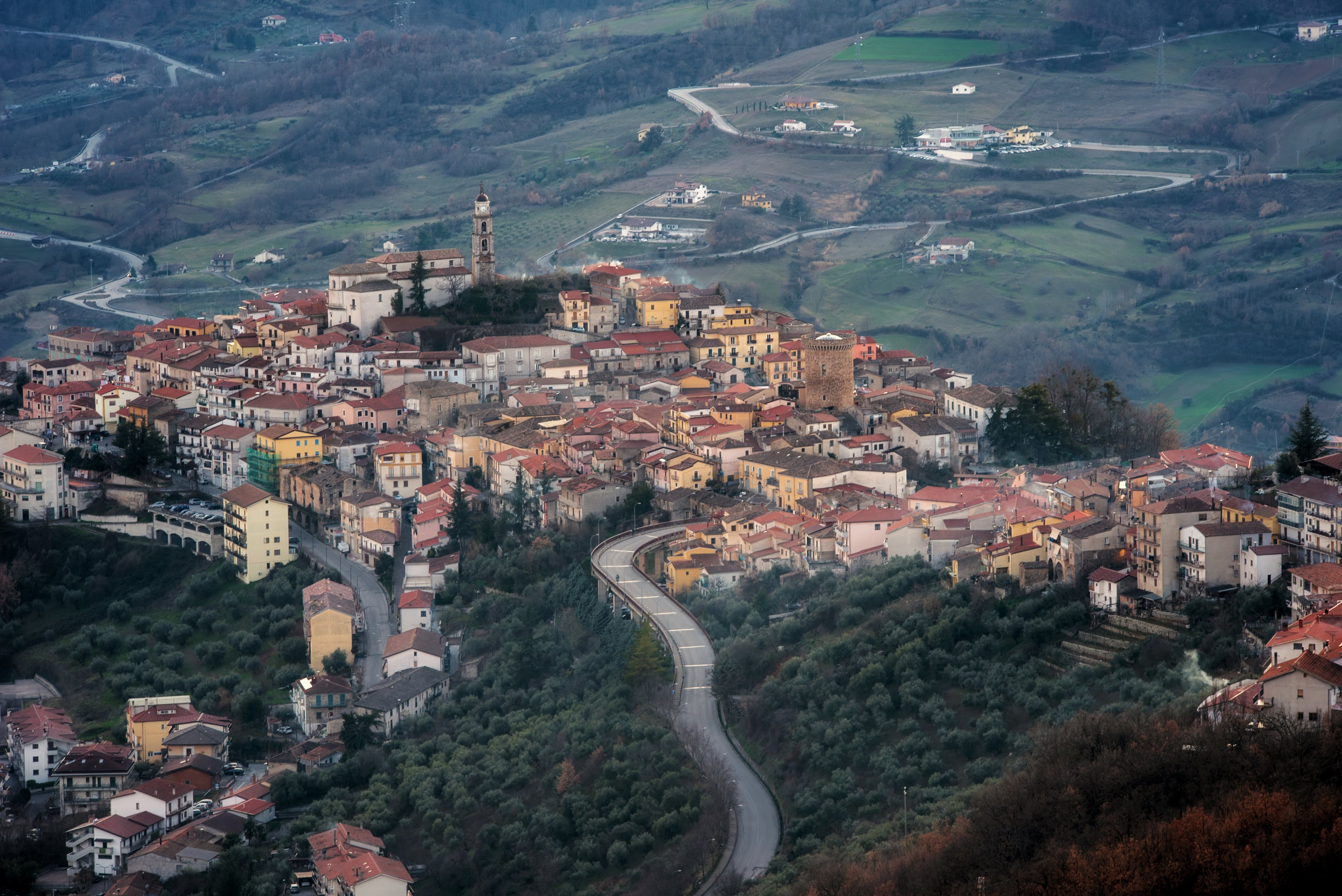
- View of Picerno

- Coat of arms

- Location of Picerno in Italy Picerno (Basilicata)
- Coordinates: 40°38′N 15°38′E
- Country: Italy
- Region: Basilicata
- Province: Potenza (PZ)

Government
  - Mayor: Margherita Scavone

Area
  - Total: 78 km^{2} (30 sq mi)
- Elevation: 721 m (2,365 ft)

Population (30 September 2025)
  - Total: 5,583
  - Density: 72/km^{2} (190/sq mi)
- Demonym: Picernesi
- Time zone: UTC+1 (CET)
  - Summer (DST): UTC+2 (CEST)
- Postal code: 85055
- Dialing code: 0971
- ISTAT code: 076059
- Patron saint: St. Nicholas
- Saint day: 9 May and 6 December
- Website: Official website

Picerno is a town and comune in the province of Potenza, in the Southern Italian region of Basilicata. It is bounded by the comuni of Balvano, Baragiano, Potenza, Ruoti, Savoia di Lucania, Tito, and Vietri di Potenza.
