= Carafa family =

Italian aristocratic family

Carafa Italian: Casa di Carafa
- Italian noble family
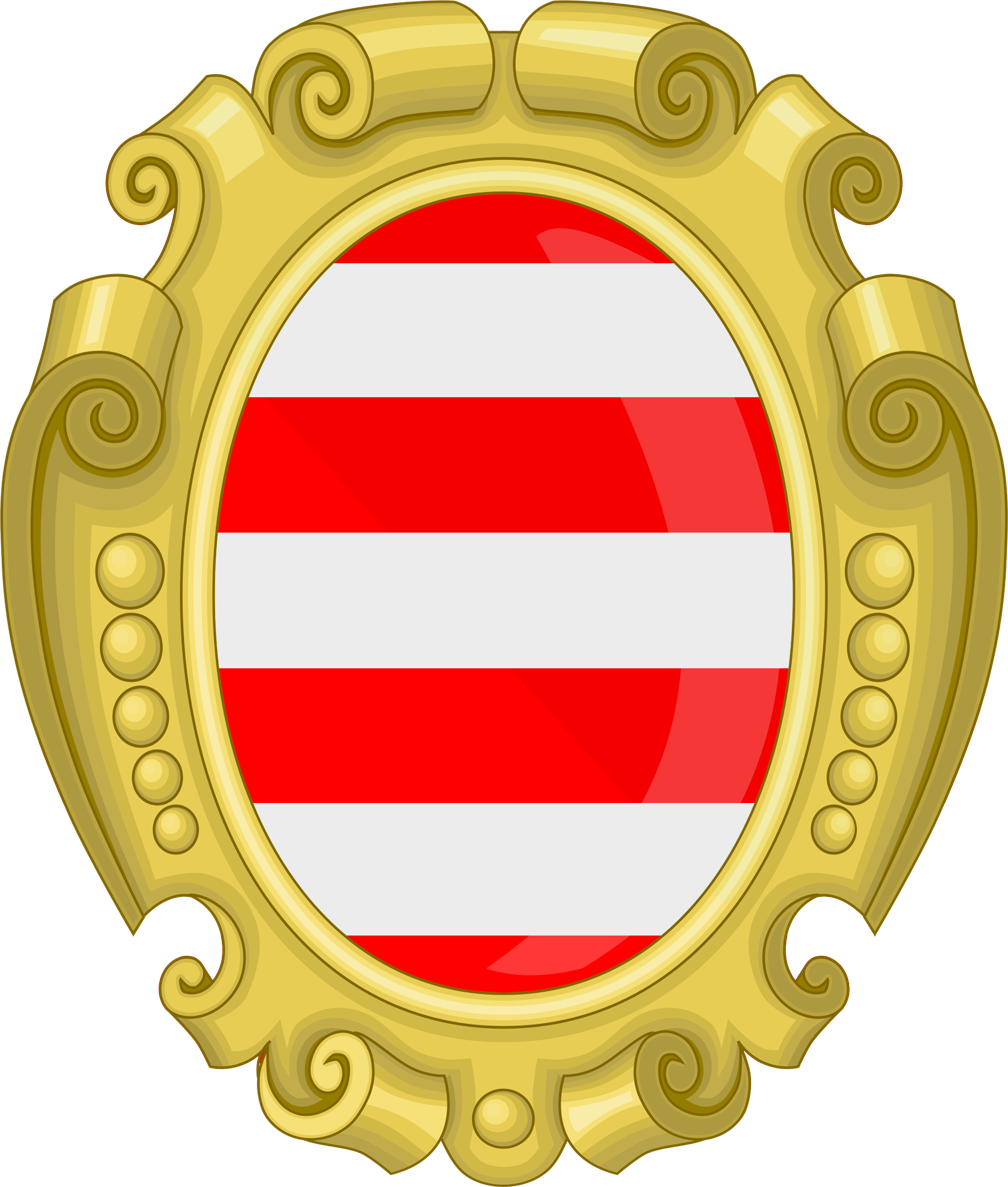
- Parent family: House of Caracciolo
- Country: Italy Former countries: Kingdom of Naples; Two Sicilies; Papal States; Kingdom of Italy
- Founded: 12th century
- Titles: List: Pope (non-hereditary); Prince of Anzi; Prince of Avella; Prince of Belvedere; Prince of Chiusano; Prince of Colobraro; Prince of Pietrelcina; Prince of Roccella; Prince of Sepino; Prince of Stigliano; Prince of San Lorenzo; Prince of the Holy Roman Empire; Duke of Alvito; Duke of Andria; Duke of Ariano; Duke of Boiano; Duke of Bruzzano; Duke of Campolieto; Duke of Campora; Duke of Cancellara; Duke of Castelnuovo; Duke of Castel del Monte; Duke of CerceMayre; Duke of Forlì del Sannio; Duke of Frosolone; Duke of Jelsi; Duke of Laurino; Duke of Maddaloni; Duke of Maierà; Duke of Mondragone; Duke of Montenero; Duke of Nocera; Duke of Noja; Duke of Paliano; Duke of Rapolla; Duke of Sant'Eramo; Duke of Traetto; Marquess of Anzi; Marquess of Baranello; Marquess of Bitetto; Marquess of Brancaleone; Marquess of Castelvetere; Marquess of Corato; Marquess of Montenero; Marquess of Montesardo; Marquess of San Lucido; Marquess of Roccacinquemiglia; Marquess of Tortorella; Count of Airola; Count of Arpaia; Count of Cerreto; Count of Condojanni; Count of Fondi; Count of Grotteria; Count of Maddaloni; Count of Marigliano; Count of Montecalvo; Count of Montorio; Count of Morcone; Count of Nocera; Count of Policastro; Count of Roccella; Count of Ruvo; Count of Soriano Calabro; Count of Sant'Angelo a Scala; Count of Santa Severina; Count of Newfoundland; Count Palatine; Baron of Apricena; Baron of Binetto; Baron of Bonifati; Baron of Campolieto; Baron of Capriati; Baron of Cerro; Baron of Civita Luparella; Baron of Colobraro; Baron of Forlì del Sannio; Baron of Girifalco; Baron of Petrella; Baron of Rocca d'Aspro; Baron of Rutigliano; Baron of Sant'Angelo a Scala; Baron of San Mauro; Baron of Sessola; Baron of Tortorella; Baron of Torraca; Baron of Trivigno; Baron of Tufara; Baron of Vallelonga; Grandee of Spain; Neapolitan Patrician
- Cadet branches: Carafa della Spina; Carfora; Carafa della Stadera

Carafa or Caraffa is the name of an old and influential Neapolitan aristocratic family of Italian nobles, clergy, and men of arts, known from the 12th century.

Divided into numerous branches, the main and most important of which are the Carafa della Spina and the Carafa della Stadera. The family was decorated with the highest titles, and it reached the height of its power with the 1555 election to the papal throne of Gian Pietro Carafa, with the name of Pope Paul IV.

== History ==
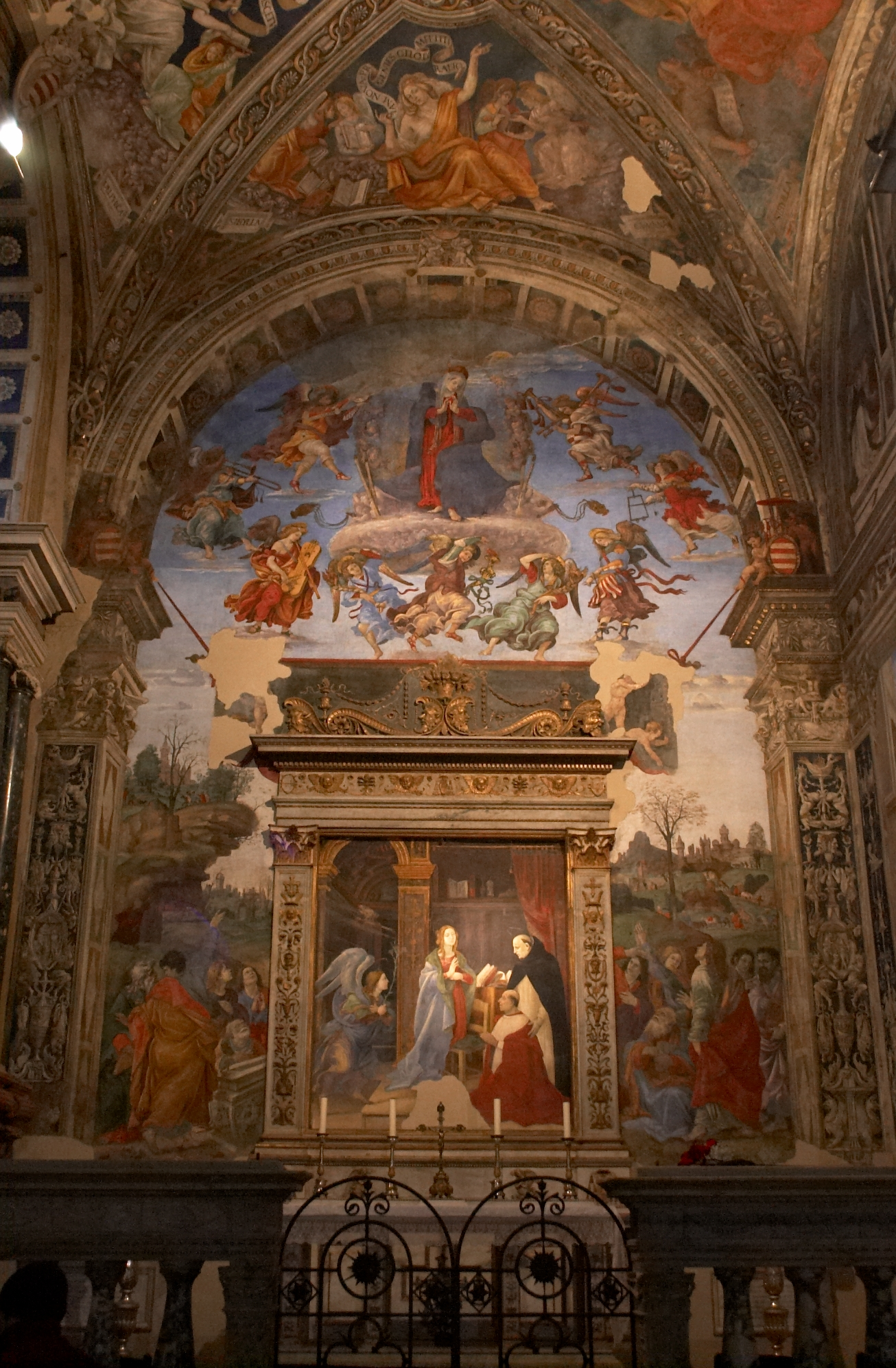
The Carafa Chapel in Santa Maria sopra Minerva, Rome.

The House of Carafa is a cadet branch of the noble House of Caracciolo, one of the most prominent families of the Neapolitan nobility. The family rose to prominence in the Kingdom of Naples during the 14th century and established itself as one of the leading noble families of southern Italy in the 15th century. Across the time, the family split in many lines, the most important being the Princes of Roccella, the Dukes of Andria and Counts of Ruvo, the Princes of Stigliano, the Dukes of Maddaloni, the Dukes of Nocera and the Dukes of Noja. The family gave sixteen cardinals to the Catholic Church, including one pope, Paul IV.

=== Carafa della Spina ===
The founder of the Carafa della Spina family was Andrea, relative of Queen Joanna I of Naples, who followed Charles III of Naples in the Hungarian war. The representatives of the family held the highest positions in the civil, military and ecclesiastical fields until reaching the papal throne. It was registered in the Neapolitan Patriciate of the Seat of Nile and, after the suppression of the seats (1800), it was registered in the Neapolitan Golden Book.

They owned numerous fiefdoms and were awarded a number of titles, including:

- Prince of: Roccella (1594), Holy Roman Empire (1563).
- Duke of: Bruzzano Vecchio (1646), Forlì (1625), Montenero, Rapolla (1623), Traetto (1712).
- Marquess of: Brancaleone, Tortorella, Castelvetere (1530) with the annexed Grandee of Spain of the First Class (1581).
- Count of: Arpaia (1605), Condojanni (1629), Count Palatine (1622), Cerro, Grotteria (1496), Policastro, Roccella (1522).
- Baron of: Bianco (1629), Carreri (1629), Cerro, Forlì (1629), Petrella, Rionegro (1666), Ripalonga, Roccasicone, Rocchetta, San Nicola di Leporino, Torraca.

=== Carafa della Stadera ===
The founder of the Carafa della Stadera family was Tommaso, son of Bartolomeo. It was registered in the Neapolitan Patriciate of the Seat of Nile and, after the suppression of the seats (1800) it was registered in the Neapolitan Golden Book.

They owned numerous fiefdoms and were awarded a number of titles, including:

- Prince of: Anzi (1633; title passed on the fief of Belvedere in 1634), Avella (1709), Belvedere (1634), Chiusano (1637), Colobraro (1617), Pietrelcina (1725), Stigliano (1522), San Lorenzo (1654).
- Duke of: Alvito, Andria (1556), Ariano, Boiano, Campolieto (1608), Campora (1659), Cancellara, Castelnuovo (1630), Castel del Monte (1556), CerceMayre (1599), Frosolone (1674), Jelsi (1606), Laurino (1591), Maddaloni, Maierà (1667), Mondragone, Nocera (1521), Noja (1600), Paliano (1566), Sant'Eramo (1568).
- Marquess of: Anzi (1576), Baranello (1621), Bitetto (1595), Corato (1727), Montenero (1573), Montesardo, San Lucido, Tortorella (1710).
- Count of: Airola (1460), Cerreto, Fondi, Maddaloni (1465), Marigliano (1482), Montecalvo (1525), Morcone, Nocera (1521), Ruvo (1510), Soriano Calabro, Sant'Angelo a Scala, Santa Severina (1496), Terranova (1499).
- Baron of: Apricena, Binetto, Bonifati, Campolieto, Capriati, Civita Luparella, Colubrano, Girifalco (1506), Rocca d'Aspro, Rutigliano, Sant'Angelo a Scala, San Mauro, Sessola, Tortorella, Torraca, Trivigno, Tufara, Vallelonga.

== Notable members ==
- Antonio Malizia Carafa (died 1437/8), diplomat
- Diomede Carafa (died 1487), councillor and humanist
- Oliviero Carafa (1430 – 20 January 1511), cardinal
- Giovanni Pietro Carafa (1476–1559), became Pope Paul IV from May 1555 until his death
- Gianvincenzo Carafa (1477-1541), cardinal
- Diomede Carafa (1492-1560), cardinal
- Carlo Carafa (1517-1561), cardinal, nephew of Pope Paul IV; executed under Pope Pius IV
- Giovanni Carafa, Duke of Paliano (died 1561), nephew of Pope Paul IV; executed under Pope Pius IV
- Antonio Carafa (1538–1591), cardinal, nephew of Pope Paul IV
- Alfonso Carafa (1540 – 1565), cardinal, grandnephew of Pope Paul IV
- Fabrizio Carafa (1588–1651), Bishop of Bitonto
- Fabrizio Carafa (died 1590), Duke of Andria; murdered by composer Carlo Gesualdo (1566–1613), Prince of Venosa and Count of Conza, for having an affair with Gesualdo's wife
- Girolamo Caraffa (1564–1633), Marquis of Montenegro, a general in Spanish and Imperial service
- Decio Carafa (1556–1626), cardinal
- Pier Luigi Carafa (1581-1655), cardinal
- Porzia Carafa, mother of Pope Innocent XII (1615-1700)
- Giuseppe Carafa (died 1647), Neapolitan aristocrat who was killed in July 1647 during the early stages of the Revolt of Masaniello against Spanish Habsburg rule
- Vincenzo Carafa (1585-1649), Superior General of the Society of Jesus
- Francesco Maria Carafa (died in prison, 1642), 5th Duke of Nochera, a Knight of the Order of the Golden Fleece; Viceroy of Aragon and Viceroy of Navarre
- Gregorio Carafa (1615–1690), Grand Master of the Order of St. John from 1680–90
- Antonio Carafa (1646–1693); Imperial Field Marshal and Knight of the Order of the Golden Fleece
- Tiberio Carafa (1669–1742), man of letters
- Pierluigi Carafa (1677–1755), Dean of the College of Cardinals
- Francesco Carafa di Trajetto (1722-1818), cardinal
- Ettore Carafa (1767-1799), late 18th-century Neapolitan Republican
- Michele Carafa (1787-1872), 19th-century Italian composer
- Domenico Carafa della Spina di Traetto (1805–1879), cardinal

== Princes of the Carafa family ==
=== Princes of the Carafa della Spina family ===
==== Princes of Roccella ====
No.	Name (birth–death)	In office (from–to)	Marriage & Offspring	Other titles/honors	Notes	Inheritance	No.
Princes of Roccella
1st	Don Fabrizio I Carafa (d. 1629)	24 March 1594	Donna Giulia Tagliavia d'Aragona dei Principi di Castelvetrano; 10 sons and 2 daughters	3rd Marquess of Castelvetere, 4th Count of Grotteria; Prince of the Holy Roman Empire, Count palatine, Neapolitan Patrician	He belonged to the cadet branch of the Carafa of the Lords and Marquesses of Castelvetere, Lords of Roccella and Counts of Grotteria	None, he was the first Prince	
1st	Don Fabrizio I Carafa (d. 1629)	7 September 1629	Donna Giulia Tagliavia d'Aragona dei Principi di Castelvetrano; 10 sons and 2 daughters	3rd Marquess of Castelvetere, 4th Count of Grotteria; Prince of the Holy Roman Empire, Count palatine, Neapolitan Patrician	He belonged to the cadet branch of the Carafa of the Lords and Marquesses of Castelvetere, Lords of Roccella and Counts of Grotteria	None, he was the first Prince	
2nd	Don Girolamo II Carafa (1583–1652)	7 September 1629	Diana Vittori; 9 sons and 7 daughters	4th Marquess of Castelvetere, 5th Count of Grotteria, Count of Condojanni, Baron of Bianco, Carreri e Pentina; Prince of the Holy Roman Empire, Count palatine, Neapolitan Patrician		Son of the preceding, Fabrizio I	
2nd	Don Girolamo II Carafa (1583–1652)	22 October 1652	Diana Vittori; 9 sons and 7 daughters	4th Marquess of Castelvetere, 5th Count of Grotteria, Count of Condojanni, Baron of Bianco, Carreri e Pentina; Prince of the Holy Roman Empire, Count palatine, Neapolitan Patrician		Son of the preceding, Fabrizio I	
3rd	Don Fabrizio II Carafa (1609–1671)	22 October 1652	Donna Agata Branciforte dei Principi di Butera; 5 sons and 6 daughters	5th Marquess of Castelvetere, 6th Count of Grotteria, Count of Condojanni, Baron of Bianco, Carreri e Pentina; Prince of the Holy Roman Empire, Count palatine, Neapolitan Patrician		Son of the preceding, Girolamo II	
3rd	Don Fabrizio II Carafa (1609–1671)	24 March 1671	Donna Agata Branciforte dei Principi di Butera; 5 sons and 6 daughters	5th Marquess of Castelvetere, 6th Count of Grotteria, Count of Condojanni, Baron of Bianco, Carreri e Pentina; Prince of the Holy Roman Empire, Count palatine, Neapolitan Patrician		Son of the preceding, Girolamo II	
4th	Don Carlo Maria Carafa (1651–1695)	24 March 1671	Donna Isabella d'Avalos d'Aquino d'Aragona dei Principi di Isernia no children	6th Marquess of Castelvetere, 7th Count of Grotteria, Count of Condojanni e Grassugliati; 5th Principe di Butera, Marquess of Militello e Licodia, 9th Count of Mazzarino, Baron of Bianco, Carretti, Pentina, Dilicello, Lisano, Carrabba, Faino, Turco, Torcotto, Magaluffa, Milione, Delera, Castelluccio e Radali; Prince of the Holy Roman Empire, Count palatine, Neapolitan Patrician		Son of the preceding, Fabrizio II	
4th	Don Carlo Maria Carafa (1651–1695)	1 June 1695	Donna Isabella d'Avalos d'Aquino d'Aragona dei Principi di Isernia no children	6th Marquess of Castelvetere, 7th Count of Grotteria, Count of Condojanni e Grassugliati; 5th Principe di Butera, Marquess of Militello e Licodia, 9th Count of Mazzarino, Baron of Bianco, Carretti, Pentina, Dilicello, Lisano, Carrabba, Faino, Turco, Torcotto, Magaluffa, Milione, Delera, Castelluccio e Radali; Prince of the Holy Roman Empire, Count palatine, Neapolitan Patrician		Son of the preceding, Fabrizio II	
5th	Donna Giulia Carafa (1653–1703)	1 June 1695	Don Federico Carafa dei Duchi di Bruzzano no children	7th Marchioness of Castelvetere, 8th Countess of Grotteria		Sister of the preceding, Carlo, and, therefore, daughter of Prince Fabrizio II	
5th	Donna Giulia Carafa (1653–1703)	4 December 1703	Don Federico Carafa dei Duchi di Bruzzano no children	7th Marchioness of Castelvetere, 8th Countess of Grotteria		Sister of the preceding, Carlo, and, therefore, daughter of Prince Fabrizio II	
6th	Don Vincenzo III Carafa (1660–1726)	3 July 1707	Donna Ippolita Cantelmo Stuart dei Principi di Pettorano e Duchi di Popoli; 2 sons and 3 daughters	3rd Duke of Bruzzano, 2nd Marquess of Brancaleone; 8th Marquess of Castelvetere, 9th Count of Grotteria; Lord of Condojanni, Motta, Bruzzano e Siderno; Prince of the Holy Roman Empire, Count palatine, Neapolitan Patrician		Son of Giuseppe, in turn son of Vincenzo II, in turn son of Fabrizio I, the 1st Prince of Roccella	
6th	Don Vincenzo III Carafa (1660–1726)	20 April 1726	Donna Ippolita Cantelmo Stuart dei Principi di Pettorano e Duchi di Popoli; 2 sons and 3 daughters	3rd Duke of Bruzzano, 2nd Marquess of Brancaleone; 8th Marquess of Castelvetere, 9th Count of Grotteria; Lord of Condojanni, Motta, Bruzzano e Siderno; Prince of the Holy Roman Empire, Count palatine, Neapolitan Patrician		Son of Giuseppe, in turn son of Vincenzo II, in turn son of Fabrizio I, the 1st Prince of Roccella	
7th	Don Gennaro I Carafa Cantelmo Stuart (1715–1767)	20 April 1726	(1st) Donna Silvia Ruffo dei Duchi di Bagnara; 1 son & 1 daughter (2nd) Princess Donna Teresa Carafa, 7th Duchess of Fondi, 11th Duchess of Chiusa and Countess of Policastro; 7 sons and 4 daughters	4th Duke of Bruzzano, 9th Marquess of Castelvetere, 3rd Marquess of Brancaleone, 10th Count of Grotteria, Lord of Condojanni, Motta, Bruzzano e Siderno; Prince of the Holy Roman Empire, Count palatine, Grandee of Spain of First Class, Neapolitan Patrician		Son of the preceding, Vincenzo III	
7th	Don Gennaro I Carafa Cantelmo Stuart (1715–1767)	31 October 1767	(1st) Donna Silvia Ruffo dei Duchi di Bagnara; 1 son & 1 daughter (2nd) Princess Donna Teresa Carafa, 7th Duchess of Fondi, 11th Duchess of Chiusa and Countess of Policastro; 7 sons and 4 daughters	4th Duke of Bruzzano, 9th Marquess of Castelvetere, 3rd Marquess of Brancaleone, 10th Count of Grotteria, Lord of Condojanni, Motta, Bruzzano e Siderno; Prince of the Holy Roman Empire, Count palatine, Grandee of Spain of First Class, Neapolitan Patrician		Son of the preceding, Vincenzo III	
8th	Don Vincenzo IV Carafa Cantelmo Stuart (1739–1814)	31 October 1767	Donna Livia Doria del Carretto dei Principi di Avella; 3 sons and 5 daughters	5th Duke of Bruzzano, 10th Marquess of Castelvetere, 4th Marquess of Brancaleone, 11th Count of Grotteria, Lord of Condojanni, Motta, Bruzzano e Siderno; Prince of the Holy Roman Empire, Count palatine, Grandee of Spain, First Class, Neapolitan Patrician		Son of the preceding, Gennaro I	
8th	Don Vincenzo IV Carafa Cantelmo Stuart (1739–1814)	20 March 1814	Donna Livia Doria del Carretto dei Principi di Avella; 3 sons and 5 daughters	5th Duke of Bruzzano, 10th Marquess of Castelvetere, 4th Marquess of Brancaleone, 11th Count of Grotteria, Lord of Condojanni, Motta, Bruzzano e Siderno; Prince of the Holy Roman Empire, Count palatine, Grandee of Spain, First Class, Neapolitan Patrician		Son of the preceding, Gennaro I	
9th	Don Gennaro Maria Carafa Cantelmo Stuart (1772–1851)	20 March 1814	Donna Maria Laura Carafa-Cantelmo-Stuart dei Principi della Roccella; 2 sons and 1 daughter	6th Duke of Bruzzano, 11th Marquess of Castelvetere, 5th Marquess of Brancaleone, 12th Count of Grotteria; Prince of the Holy Roman Empire, Count palatine, Grandee of Spain, First Class, Neapolitan Patrician		Son of the preceding, Vincenzo IV	
9th	Don Gennaro Maria Carafa Cantelmo Stuart (1772–1851)	10 November 1851	Donna Maria Laura Carafa-Cantelmo-Stuart dei Principi della Roccella; 2 sons and 1 daughter	6th Duke of Bruzzano, 11th Marquess of Castelvetere, 5th Marquess of Brancaleone, 12th Count of Grotteria; Prince of the Holy Roman Empire, Count palatine, Grandee of Spain, First Class, Neapolitan Patrician		Son of the preceding, Vincenzo IV	
10th	Don Vincenzo V Carafa Cantelmo Stuart (1802–1879)	10 November 1851	Donna Lucrezia Pignatelli dei Principi di Monteroduni; 3 sons and 3 daughters	7th Duke of Bruzzano, 12th Marquess of Castelvetere, 6th Marquess of Brancaleone, 13th Count of Grotteria; Prince of the Holy Roman Empire, Count palatine, Grandee of Spain, First Class, Neapolitan Patrician		Son of the preceding, Gennaro Maria	
10th	Don Vincenzo V Carafa Cantelmo Stuart (1802–1879)	18 July 1879	Donna Lucrezia Pignatelli dei Principi di Monteroduni; 3 sons and 3 daughters	7th Duke of Bruzzano, 12th Marquess of Castelvetere, 6th Marquess of Brancaleone, 13th Count of Grotteria; Prince of the Holy Roman Empire, Count palatine, Grandee of Spain, First Class, Neapolitan Patrician		Son of the preceding, Gennaro Maria	
11th	Don Gennaro Carafa Cantelmo Stuart (1833–1903)	23 December 1900	Donna Clotilde de' Medici di Ottajano no children	8th Duke of Bruzzano, 13th Marquess of Castelvetere, 7th Marquess of Brancaleone, 14th Count of Grotteria; Prince of the Holy Roman Empire, Count palatine, Grandee of Spain, First Class, Neapolitan Patrician		Son of the preceding, Vincenzo V	
11th	Don Gennaro Carafa Cantelmo Stuart (1833–1903)	24 July 1903	Donna Clotilde de' Medici di Ottajano no children	8th Duke of Bruzzano, 13th Marquess of Castelvetere, 7th Marquess of Brancaleone, 14th Count of Grotteria; Prince of the Holy Roman Empire, Count palatine, Grandee of Spain, First Class, Neapolitan Patrician		Son of the preceding, Vincenzo V	
12th	Don Luigi Carafa Cantelmo Stuart (1837–1913)	24 July 1903	Donna Maria Giuseppa Pignatelli della Leonessa dei Principi di Monteroduni; 3 sons and 3 daughters	9th Duke of Bruzzano, 14th Marquess of Castelvetere, 8th Marquess of Brancaleone, 15th Count of Grotteria; Prince of the Holy Roman Empire, Count palatine, Grandee of Spain, First Class, Neapolitan Patrician		Brother of the preceding, Gennaro, and, therefore, son of Prince Vincenzo V	
12th	Don Luigi Carafa Cantelmo Stuart (1837–1913)	7 May 1913	Donna Maria Giuseppa Pignatelli della Leonessa dei Principi di Monteroduni; 3 sons and 3 daughters	9th Duke of Bruzzano, 14th Marquess of Castelvetere, 8th Marquess of Brancaleone, 15th Count of Grotteria; Prince of the Holy Roman Empire, Count palatine, Grandee of Spain, First Class, Neapolitan Patrician		Brother of the preceding, Gennaro, and, therefore, son of Prince Vincenzo V	
13th	Don Vincenzo VI Carafa Cantelmo Stuart (1870–1918)	7 May 1913	Donna Maria Assunta Colonna dei Principi di Summonte; 3 sons and 1 daughter	10th Duke of Bruzzano, 15th Marquess of Castelvetere, 9th Marquess of Brancaleone, 16th Count of Grotteria; Prince of the Holy Roman Empire, Count palatine, Grandee of Spain, First Class, Neapolitan Patrician		Son of the preceding, Luigi	
13th	Don Vincenzo VI Carafa Cantelmo Stuart (1870–1918)	16 October 1918	Donna Maria Assunta Colonna dei Principi di Summonte; 3 sons and 1 daughter	10th Duke of Bruzzano, 15th Marquess of Castelvetere, 9th Marquess of Brancaleone, 16th Count of Grotteria; Prince of the Holy Roman Empire, Count palatine, Grandee of Spain, First Class, Neapolitan Patrician		Son of the preceding, Luigi	
14th	Don Gennaro II Carafa Cantelmo Stuart (1905–1982)	16 October 1918	Nobile Sobilia Palmieri Nuti no children	11th Duke of Bruzzano, 16th Marquess of Castelvetere, 10th Marquess of Brancaleone, 17th Count of Grotteria; Prince of the Holy Roman Empire, Count palatine, Grandee of Spain, First Class, Neapolitan Patrician		Son of the preceding, Vincenzo VI	
14th	Don Gennaro II Carafa Cantelmo Stuart (1905–1982)	30 May 1982	Nobile Sobilia Palmieri Nuti no children	11th Duke of Bruzzano, 16th Marquess of Castelvetere, 10th Marquess of Brancaleone, 17th Count of Grotteria; Prince of the Holy Roman Empire, Count palatine, Grandee of Spain, First Class, Neapolitan Patrician		Son of the preceding, Vincenzo VI	
15th	Don Gregorio Carafa Cantelmo Stuart (1945–living)	30 May 1982	Laura de Grenet; 2 daughters	12th Duke of Bruzzano, 17th Marquess of Castelvetere, 11th Marquess of Brancaleone, 18th Count of Grotteria; Prince of the Holy Roman Empire, Count palatine, Grandee of Spain, First Class, Neapolitan Patrician	Last legitimate direct male heir, with him the Carafa della Roccella branch will become extinct	Grandson of the preceding, Gennaro II. He is the son of Luigi, in turn the son of Prince Vincenzo VI	

=== Princes of the Carafa della Stadera family ===
==== Princes of Anzi ====
No.	Name (birth–death)	In office (from–to)	Marriage & Offspring	Other titles/honors	Notes	Inheritance	No.
Princes of Anzi
1st	Don Ottavio Carafa (1589–1652)	13 November 1633	(1st) Donna Caterina Carafa (2nd) Donna Porzia Sanseverino	4th Marquess of Rocca di Cinquemiglia, Neapolitan Patrician	1st Prince of Anzi with Privilege given in Madrid on 13 November 1633, but later supports the title on the fief of Belvedere on 30 July 1634	None, he was the first Prince	
1st	Don Ottavio Carafa (1589–1652)	30 July 1634	(1st) Donna Caterina Carafa (2nd) Donna Porzia Sanseverino	4th Marquess of Rocca di Cinquemiglia, Neapolitan Patrician	1st Prince of Anzi with Privilege given in Madrid on 13 November 1633, but later supports the title on the fief of Belvedere on 30 July 1634	None, he was the first Prince	

==== Princes of Avella ====
No.	Name (birth–death)	In office (from–to)	Marriage & Offspring	Other titles/honors	Notes	Inheritance	No.
Princes of Avella
1st	Don Girolamo Malizia Carafa (1647–1723)	20 March 1709		Neapolitan Patrician		None, he was the first Prince	
1st	Don Girolamo Malizia Carafa (1647–1723)	2 August 1723		Neapolitan Patrician		None, he was the first Prince	
2nd	Don Giuseppe Carafa (c.1686–c.1729)	2 August 1723	Anna Elisabetta Contessa von Oppersdorff	Neapolitan Patrician	Illegitimate son, legitimized on 20 April 1709 with Privilege of King Charles III of Spain, King of Naples as Charles VII		
2nd	Don Giuseppe Carafa (c.1686–c.1729)	??? (will: 2 April 1729)	Anna Elisabetta Contessa von Oppersdorff	Neapolitan Patrician	Illegitimate son, legitimized on 20 April 1709 with Privilege of King Charles III of Spain, King of Naples as Charles VII		
3rd	Don Carlo Malizia Carafa (1725–1780)	23 April 1767	Maria Teresa d'Hemricourt	Neapolitan Patrician	He lost his princely title with the fall of Emperor Charles VI, King of Naples, because he was loyal to the Austrian government		
3rd	Don Carlo Malizia Carafa (1725–1780)	???	Maria Teresa d'Hemricourt	Neapolitan Patrician	He lost his princely title with the fall of Emperor Charles VI, King of Naples, because he was loyal to the Austrian government		

==== Princes of Belvedere ====
No.	Name (birth–death)	In office (from–to)	Marriage & Offspring	Other titles/honors	Notes	Inheritance	No.
Princes of Belvedere
1st	Don Ottavio Carafa (1589–1652)	30 July 1634	(1st) Donna Caterina Carafa (2nd) Donna Porzia Sanseverino	4th Marquess of Roccacinquemiglia; Neapolitan Patrician	Already 1st Prince of Anzi with Privilege given in Madrid on 13 November[1633, but later supports the title on the fief of Belvedere on 30 July 1634	None, he was the first Prince	
1st	Don Ottavio Carafa (1589–1652)	18 December 1652	(1st) Donna Caterina Carafa (2nd) Donna Porzia Sanseverino	4th Marquess of Roccacinquemiglia; Neapolitan Patrician	Already 1st Prince of Anzi with Privilege given in Madrid on 13 November[1633, but later supports the title on the fief of Belvedere on 30 July 1634	None, he was the first Prince	
2nd	Don Francesco Maria Carafa (...–1711)	18 December 1652	(1st) Silvia di Somma (2nd) Donna Giovanna Oliva Grimaldi	5th Marquess of Anzi, 5th Marquess of Roccacinquemiglia, Baron of Gallicchio and Missanello, Lord of Trivigno; Neapolitan Patrician			
2nd	Don Francesco Maria Carafa (...–1711)	1695 (rejected in favor of the son with Royal Assent)	(1st) Silvia di Somma (2nd) Donna Giovanna Oliva Grimaldi	5th Marquess of Anzi, 5th Marquess of Roccacinquemiglia, Baron of Gallicchio and Missanello, Lord of Trivigno; Neapolitan Patrician			
3rd	Don Carlo Carafa (1674–1706)	1695	Elisabetta van den Eynde, Baroness of Gallicchio and Missanello (by concession of her father-in-law in 1689)	6th Marquess of Anzi and Lord of Trivigno; Neapolitan Patrician			
3rd	Don Carlo Carafa (1674–1706)	12 October 1706	Elisabetta van den Eynde, Baroness of Gallicchio and Missanello (by concession of her father-in-law in 1689)	6th Marquess of Anzi and Lord of Trivigno; Neapolitan Patrician			
4th	Don Francesco Maria Carafa (1696–1773)	12 October 1706	Princess Francesca Cecilia Boncompagni Ludovisi	7th Marquess of Anzi; Baron of Trivigno, di Bonifati e Mottafollone con San Sosti; Neapolitan Patrician			
4th	Don Francesco Maria Carafa (1696–1773)	16 August 1773	Princess Francesca Cecilia Boncompagni Ludovisi	7th Marquess of Anzi; Baron of Trivigno, di Bonifati e Mottafollone con San Sosti; Neapolitan Patrician			
5th	Don Carlo Carafa (1724–1788)	16 August 1773	Donna Maria Giulia Caracciolo	8th Marquess of Anzi; Baron of Trivigno, of Bonifati and Mottafollone with San Sosti; Neapolitan Patrician			
5th	Don Carlo Carafa (1724–1788)	29 June 1788	Donna Maria Giulia Caracciolo	8th Marquess of Anzi; Baron of Trivigno, of Bonifati and Mottafollone with San Sosti; Neapolitan Patrician			
6th	Don Francesco Carafa (1760–1805)	29 June 1788		9th Marquess of Anzi; Baron of Bonifati and Mottafollone with San Sosti; Neapolitan Patrician			
6th	Don Francesco Carafa (1760–1805)	2 March 1805		9th Marquess of Anzi; Baron of Bonifati and Mottafollone with San Sosti; Neapolitan Patrician			
7th	Don Marino Carafa (1764–1830)	2 March 1805	Donna Marianna Gaetani dell'Aquila d'Aragona	10th Marquess of Anzi (the minor titles disappear with the eversion of the fiefs in 1806); Neapolitan Patrician	Already Cardinal of the Holy Roman Church, he renounced his ecclesiastical career to succeed his brother Francesco		
7th	Don Marino Carafa (1764–1830)	5 April 1830	Donna Marianna Gaetani dell'Aquila d'Aragona	10th Marquess of Anzi (the minor titles disappear with the eversion of the fiefs in 1806); Neapolitan Patrician	Already Cardinal of the Holy Roman Church, he renounced his ecclesiastical career to succeed his brother Francesco		
8th	Don Carlo Carafa (1811–1832)	5 April 1830		11th Marquess of Anzi; Neapolitan Patrician			
8th	Don Carlo Carafa (1811–1832)	2 October 1832		11th Marquess of Anzi; Neapolitan Patrician			
9th	Donna Giulia Carafa (1809–1871)	2 October 1832	Don Filippo Saluzzo, 6th Duke of Corigliano	12th Marchioness of Anzi			
9th	Donna Giulia Carafa (1809–1871)	21 April 1871	Don Filippo Saluzzo, 6th Duke of Corigliano	12th Marchioness of Anzi			

==== Princes of Chiusano ====
No.	Name (birth–death)	In office (from–to)	Marriage & Offspring	Other titles/honors	Notes	Inheritance	No.
Princes of Chiusano
1st	Don Tiberio Carafa (1614–1667)	27 July 1637 with Privilege from Madrid (executive in Naples from 3 July 1638)	Donna Cristina Carafa	Lord of Regino; Neapolitan Patrician		None, he was the first Prince	
1st	Don Tiberio Carafa (1614–1667)	23 April 1667	Donna Cristina Carafa	Lord of Regino; Neapolitan Patrician		None, he was the first Prince	
2nd	Don Fabrizio Carafa (1638–1667)	23 April 1667	Donna Beatrice della Leonessa	Lord of Regino e di Paternopoli; Neapolitan Patrician			
2nd	Don Fabrizio Carafa (1638–1667)	18 February 1711	Donna Beatrice della Leonessa	Lord of Regino e di Paternopoli; Neapolitan Patrician			
3rd	Don Tiberio Carafa (1665–1742)	18 February 1711	(1st) Donna Giovanna Carafa (2nd) Donna Maria Giuseppa Pinelli	Lord of Paternopoli; Neapolitan Patrician	He participated in the failed Conspiracy of Macchia and his titles were confiscated. After his death, his surviving brothers renounced the succession.		
3rd	Don Tiberio Carafa (1665–1742)	??? (titular prince until death)	(1st) Donna Giovanna Carafa (2nd) Donna Maria Giuseppa Pinelli	Lord of Paternopoli; Neapolitan Patrician	He participated in the failed Conspiracy of Macchia and his titles were confiscated. After his death, his surviving brothers renounced the succession.		

==== Princes of Pietrelcina ====
No.	Name (birth–death)	In office (from–to)	Marriage & Offspring	Other titles/honors	Notes	Inheritance	No.
Princes of Pietrelcina
1st	Don Francesco Carafa (1689–1768)	9 January 1725	Donna Ippolita Caracciolo	4th Duke of Campora and 2nd Duke of Jelsi (since 1759); Neapolitan Patrician		None, he was the first Prince	
1st	Don Francesco Carafa (1689–1768)	9 January 1768	Donna Ippolita Caracciolo	4th Duke of Campora and 2nd Duke of Jelsi (since 1759); Neapolitan Patrician		None, he was the first Prince	

==== Princes of Sepino ====
No.	Name (birth–death)	In office (from–to)	Marriage & Offspring	Other titles/honors	Notes	Inheritance	No.
Princes of Sepino
1st	Don Francesco Carafa (...–1639)	29 October 1627	(1st) Beatrice Caracciolo (2nd) Lucrezia Caracciolo	Baron of Binetto; Neapolitan Patrician	Already Lord of Sepino since 1596	None, he was the first Prince	
1st	Don Francesco Carafa (...–1639)	19 July 1639	(1st) Beatrice Caracciolo (2nd) Lucrezia Caracciolo	Baron of Binetto; Neapolitan Patrician	Already Lord of Sepino since 1596	None, he was the first Prince	
2nd	Donna Delizia Carafa (1618–1656)	19 July 1639	Don Carlo della Leonessa, 2nd Duke of San Martino				
2nd	Donna Delizia Carafa (1618–1656)	28 August 1656	Don Carlo della Leonessa, 2nd Duke of San Martino				

==== Princes of Stigliano ====
No.	Name (birth–death)	In office (from–to)	Marriage & Offspring	Other titles/honors	Notes	Inheritance	No.
Princes of Stigliano
Don Antonio I Carafa della Stadera was a rich feudal lord, owner of the territories of Mondragone, Castelnuovo, San Lorenzo, Laviano, Castelgrande, Rapone, Alianello, Sant'Arcangelo, Roccanova, Stigliano, Accettura, Gorgoglione and Guardia. Already created 1st Duke of Mondragone with Privilege dated Barcelona 9 April 1519 (executive: Naples 27 October 1519), he was also created 1st Prince of Stigliano with Privilege dated 21 June 1522.
1st	Don Antonio I Carafa della Stadera (...–1528)	21 June 1522	Donna Ippolita di Capua dei Conti di Altavilla; 5 sons and 3 daughters	Already Lord of Mondragone before 1479; In 1519 he was created 1st Duke of Mondragone; Neapolitan Patrician		None, he was the first Prince	
1st	Don Antonio I Carafa della Stadera (...–1528)	27 June 1528	Donna Ippolita di Capua dei Conti di Altavilla; 5 sons and 3 daughters	Already Lord of Mondragone before 1479; In 1519 he was created 1st Duke of Mondragone; Neapolitan Patrician		None, he was the first Prince	
2nd	Don Luigi I Carafa della Stadera (1511–1576)	27 June 1528	(1st) Donna Clarice Orsini dei Signori di Bracciano; 1 son (2nd) Donna Lucrezia del Tufo dei Marchesi di Lavello; 1 son & 1 daughter	2nd Duke of Mondragone; Lord of many fiefs; (Note: Lord of Montenero, Castelnuovo, San Lorenzo, Laviano, Castelgrande, Rapone, Alianello, Sant'Arcangelo, Roccanova, Accettura, Gorgoglione, Guardia, Jannano e Pietra d'Acino per eredità paterna since 1528. He bought Riardo in 1544, Teano in 1546, Roccamonfina in 1550, Sessa in 1552, Minervino in 1560, and also bought Volturara, Moliterno, Armento, Montenuovo, Procina, San Nicandro, Pietravairano, Casafredda and Galluccio.) Neapolitan Patrician		Son of the preceding, Antonio	
2nd	Don Luigi I Carafa della Stadera (1511–1576)	17 July 1576	(1st) Donna Clarice Orsini dei Signori di Bracciano; 1 son (2nd) Donna Lucrezia del Tufo dei Marchesi di Lavello; 1 son & 1 daughter	2nd Duke of Mondragone; Lord of many fiefs; Neapolitan Patrician		Son of the preceding, Antonio	
3rd	Don Antonio II Carafa della Stadera (1542–1578)	17 July 1576	(1st) Donna Ippolita Gonzaga dei Conti di Guastalla; 1 daughter (2nd) Donna Giovanna Colonna dei Principi di Paliano; 2 figli	3rd Duke of Mondragone; Lord of many fiefs; (Note: Lord of Montenero, Castelnuovo, San Lorenzo, Laviano, Castelgrande, Rapone, Alianello, Sant'Arcangelo, Roccanova, Accettura, Gorgoglione, Guardia, Jannano, Pietra d'Acino, Riardo, Teano, Roccamonfina, Sessa, Minervino, Volturara, Moliterno, Armento, Montenuovo, Procina, San Nicandro, Pietravairano, Casafredda e Galluccio.) Neapolitan Patrician; Grandee of Spain, First Class		Son of the preceding, Luigi	
3rd	Don Antonio II Carafa della Stadera (1542–1578)	14 August 1578	(1st) Donna Ippolita Gonzaga dei Conti di Guastalla; 1 daughter (2nd) Donna Giovanna Colonna dei Principi di Paliano; 2 figli	3rd Duke of Mondragone; Lord of many fiefs; Neapolitan Patrician; Grandee of Spain, First Class		Son of the preceding, Luigi	
4th	Don Luigi II Carafa della Stadera (1567–1630)	14 August 1578	Donna Isabella Gonzaga, Duchess of Sabbioneta, Duchess of Traetto, Countess of Fondi, Baroness of Caramanico, Lady of many fiefs (Note: Signora di Acquaviva, Inola, Maranola, Carpello, Sperlonga, Monticelli, Pastena, Schigia, Turino and Agnone.); 1 son	4th Duke of Mondragone, titular Duke of Sabbioneta, Duke of Traetto; Count of Fondi; Baron of Calotone, Piadena e Spineda; Lord of many fiefs; (Note: Lord of Montenero, San Lorenzo, Laviano, Castelgrande, Rapone, Alianello, Sant'Arcangelo, Roccanova, Accettura, Gorgoglione, Guardia, Jannano, Pietra d'Acino, Riardo, Teano, Roccamonfina, Sessa, Minervino, Volturara, Moliterno, Armento, Montenuovo, Procina, San Nicandro, Pietravairano, Casafredda, Galluccio, Capolungo, Itri, Fratta, Castelforte, Spigno, Sperlonga, Pastena, Sauvi, Casalnuovo, Castellorato, Monticello, Isola, Campomele, Caramanico e Torcello.) Neapolitan Patrician; Grandee of Spain, First Class		Son of the preceding, Antonio	
4th	Don Luigi II Carafa della Stadera (1567–1630)	22 January 1630	Donna Isabella Gonzaga, Duchess of Sabbioneta, Duchess of Traetto, Countess of Fondi, Baroness of Caramanico, Lady of many fiefs 1 son	4th Duke of Mondragone, titular Duke of Sabbioneta, Duke of Traetto; Count of Fondi; Baron of Calotone, Piadena e Spineda; Lord of many fiefs; Neapolitan Patrician; Grandee of Spain, First Class		Son of the preceding, Antonio	
5th	Donna Anna Carafa della Stadera (1607–1644)	1637	Don Ramiro Felipe Núñez de Guzmán, 2nd Duke of Medina de las Torres, 2nd Marquess of Toral, and Viceroy of Naples; 3 figli	6th Duchess of Mondragone, Duchess of Traetto; Countess of Fondi; Baroness of Calotone, Piadena e Spineda; Lady of many fiefs (Note: Signora di Montenero, San Lorenzo, Laviano, Castelgrande, Rapone, Alianello, Sant'Arcangelo, Roccanova, Accettura, Gorgoglione, Guardia, Jannano, Pietra d'Acino, Riardo, Teano, Roccamonfina, Sessa, Minervino, Volturara, Moliterno, Armento, Montenuovo, Procina, San Nicandro, Pietravairano, Casafredda, Galluccio, Capolungo, Itri, Fratta, Castelforte, Spigno, Sperlonga, Pastena, Sauvi, Casalnuovo, Castellorato, Monticello, Isola, Campomele, Caramanico, Torcello, etc.)	By marriage: Duchess consort of Medina de las Torres; Marchioness consort of Toral; Viceroy consort of Naples	Granddaughter of the preceding, Luigi. She was the daughter of Antonio Carafa della Stadera, 5th Duke of Mondragone and only son of Luigi.	
5th	Donna Anna Carafa della Stadera (1607–1644)	24 October 1644	Don Ramiro Felipe Núñez de Guzmán, 2nd Duke of Medina de las Torres, 2nd Marquess of Toral, and Viceroy of Naples; 3 figli	6th Duchess of Mondragone, Duchess of Traetto; Countess of Fondi; Baroness of Calotone, Piadena e Spineda; Lady of many fiefs	By marriage: Duchess consort of Medina de las Torres; Marchioness consort of Toral; Viceroy consort of Naples	Granddaughter of the preceding, Luigi. She was the daughter of Antonio Carafa della Stadera, 5th Duke of Mondragone and only son of Luigi.	
Upon the death of the last exponent and princess of the Carafa di Stigliano family, her titles passed to her firstborn son Nicolás María de Guzmán y Carafa, 3rd Duke of Medina de las Torres and 3rd Marquess of Toral, who however died without heirs. Thus the fiefdom of Stigliano returned first to the Crown of Naples and then became the property of a branch of the powerful Colonna family, that of the Princes of Sonnino, who in 1796 moved their princely title from Sonnino to Stigliano, a title they still hold today.

== Cardinals and Archbishops ==
The Carafa family, as happened with many other noble families, gave the Catholic Church numerous prelates, including various cardinals and archbishops. Over the centuries the Carafa family produced 16 cardinals (of whom one, Gian Pietro Carafa, was elected pope) and 11 archbishops (of whom 6 were also cardinals). One of these cardinals, Marino Carafa di Belvedere, later renounced ecclesiastical life and became the 1st Mayor of Naples.

Cardinals of the Holy Roman Church
Image	Name	Birth	Created Cardinal	Death	Cardinal duties	Archbishop and/or other duties	N.
	Filippo Carafa della Serra	c. 1340	September 18, 1378 by Pope Urban VI	May 22 or 23, 1389 (c. 48-49 years old)	Cardinal Priest of Saints Silvestro and Martino ai Monti (1378 – 1389)	Apostolic Administrator of Bologna (1378 – 1389)	
	Oliviero Carafa	March 10, 1430	September 18, 1467 by Pope Paul II	January 20, 1511 (80 years old)	Cardinal Priest of Saints Marcellinus and Peter (1467–70) of Saint Eusebius (1470–1511) Cardinal Bishop of Albano (1476–83), of Sabina (1483–1503), of Ostia and Velletri (1503–11) Camerlengo of the College of Cardinals (1477–78) Dean of the College of Cardinals (1492–1511)	Archbishop of Naples (1458–84; 1503–05) Commendatory Abbot of Santa Maria di Cadossa (1469–99); Apostolic Administrator of Cava and Abbot of the Holy Trinity (1485–97); Apostolic Administrator of Salamanca(1491–94), of Cadiz and Algeciras (1495–1511), of Rimini (1495–97), of Chieti (1500–01), of Naples (1503–05), Caiazzo (1506–07), of Terracina, Sezze and Priverno (1507–10), of Segni (1507–11), Tricarico (1510–11) Governor of Velletri (1503–11)	
	Gianvincenzo Carafa	1477	November 21, 1527 by Pope Clement VII	August 28, 1541 (63–64 years old)	Cardinal Priest of Santa Pudenziana (1528–37), of Santa Prisca (1537), of Santa Maria in Trastevere (1537–39) Camerlengo of the College of Cardinals (1533–34) Cardinal Bishop of Palestrina (1539–41)	Archbishop of Naples (1505–30) Bishop of Rimini (1497–1505) Apostolic administrator of Anglona (1528–36), of Anagni (1534–41), Acerra (1535–39)	
	Gian Pietro Carafa	June 28, 1476	December 22, 1536 by Pope Paul II	August 18, 1559 (age 83)		Archbishop of Chieti (1505–18; 1537–49), of Brindisi (1518–24), of Naples (1549–55) Gian Pietro was, with the name of Paul IV, the 223rd Pope of the Catholic Church from 23 May 1555 until his death.	
	Carlo Carafa	March 29, 1517	June 7, 1555 by Pope Paul IV	March 4, 1561 (age 43)	Cardinal deacon of Santi Vito e Modesto in Macello Martyrum (1555–60) Cardinal Deacon of San Nicola in Carcere (1560–61)	Apostolic Legate of Bologna (1555–58) Apostolic Administrator of Comminges (1556–61)	
	Diomede Carafa	January 7, 1492	December 20, 1555 by Pope Paul IV	August 12, 1560 (age 68)	Cardinal Priest of Saints Silvestro and Martino ai Monti (1556–60)	Bishop of Ariano (1511–60)	
	Alfonso Carafa	July 16, 1540	March 15, 1557 by Pope Paul IV	August 29, 1565 (25 years old)	Cardinal Deacon of San Nicola fra le Immagini (1557–58), of Santa Maria in Portico Octaviae (1558–59), of Santa Maria in Domnica (1559–60) Cardinal Priest of Saints John and Paul (1560–65)	Archbishop of Naples (1557–65) Governor of Benevento (1558–60) Librarian of the Holy Roman Church (1559–65)	
	Antonio Carafa	March 25, 1538	March 24, 1568 by Pope Pius V	January 13, 1591 (age 52)	Cardinal Deacon of Sant'Eusebio (1568–73), of Santa Maria in Cosmedin (1573–77), of Santa Maria in Via Lata (1577–83) Cardinal Protodeacon (1577–83) Cardinal Priest of Saints John and Paul (1584–91)	Librarian of the Holy Roman Church (1585–91) Prefect of the Congregation of the Council (1586–91)	
	Decio Carafa	1556	August 17, 1611 by Pope Paul V	January 23, 1626 (age 69-70)	Cardinal Priest of San Lorenzo in Panisperna (1612), of Saints John and Paul (1612–26)	Archbishop of Naples (1613–26) Titular Archbishop of Damascus (1606–11) Apostolic Collector in Portugal (1598–1604) Apostolic Nuncio to Flanders (1606–07), to Spain (1607–11)	
	Pier Luigi Carafa	July 18, 1581	March 6, 1645 by Pope Innocent X	February 15, 1655 (age 73)	Cardinal Priest of Saints Silvestro and Martino ai Monti (1645–55)	Bishop of Tricarico (1624–46) Apostolic Nuncio in Cologne (1624–34) Prefect of the Congregation of the Council (1645–55)	
	Carlo Carafa della Spina	April 21, 1611	January 14, 1664 by Pope Alexander VII	October 19, 1680 (age 69)	Cardinal Priest of Santa Susanna (1665–75), of Santa Maria in Via (1675–80) Camerlengo of the College of Cardinals (1676–78)	Bishop of Aversa (1644–65) Apostolic Nuncio to Switzerland (1653–54), to the Republic of Venice (1654–58), to Austria (1658–64) Apostolic Legate of Bologna (1664–69)	
	Fortunato Ilario Carafa della Spina	February 16, 1631	September 2, 1686 by Pope Innocent XI	January 16, 1697 (age 65)	Cardinal Priest of Saints John and Paul (1687–97)	Bishop of Aversa (1687–97) Apostolic Legate of Romagna (1693–94)	
	Pier Luigi Carafa	July 4, 1677	September 20, 1728 by Pope Benedict XIII	December 15, 1755 (age 78)	Cardinal Priest of San Lorenzo in Panisperna (1728–37), of Santa Prisca (1737–40) Camerlengo of the College of Cardinals (1737–38), Sub-Dean (1751–53) and Dean of the College of Cardinals (1753–55) Cardinal Bishop of Albano (1740–51), of Porto–Santa Rufina (1751–53), of Ostia and Velletri (1753–55)	Titular Archbishop of Larissa and Tyrnavos (1713–28) Apostolic Nuncio to the Grand Duchy of Tuscany (1713–17) Secretary of the Congregation for the Propagation of the Faith (1717–14) and of the Congregation of Bishops and Regulars (1724–28) Governor of Velletri (1753–55)	
	Francesco Carafa della Spina di Traetto	April 29, 1722	April 19, 1773 by Pope Clement XIV	November 20, 1818 (96 years old)	Cardinal Priest of San Clemente (1773–88), of San Lorenzo in Lucina (1788–1807), of San Lorenzo in Damaso (1807–18) Cardinal Protopriest (1803–18)	Titular Archbishop of Patras (1760–73) Apostolic Nuncio to the Republic of Venice (1760–66) Secretary (1766–73) and Prefect (1775–1818) of the Congregation of Bishops and Regulars Apostolic Legate of Ferrara (1778–86) Vice-Chancellor of the Holy Roman Church (1807–18)	
	Marino Carafa di Belvedere	January 29, 1764	February 23, 1801 by Pope Pius VII Resigned on August 24, 1807	April 5, 1830 (aged 66)	Cardinal Deacon of San Nicola in Carcere (1801–07)	Prefect of the Apostolic Palace (1794–1801) 1st Mayor of Naples (1813–17)	
	Domenico Carafa della Spina di Traetto	July 12, 1805	July 22, 1844 by Pope Gregory XVI	June 17, 1879 (aged 73)	Cardinal Priest of Santa Maria degli Angeli (1844–79), of San Lorenzo in Lucina (1879) Camerlengo of the College of Cardinals (1864–65)	Metropolitan Archbishop of Benevento (1844–79) Secretary of Apostolic Briefs (1879)	
Archbishops
Image	Name	Birth	Appointed/Consecrated or Elevated Archbishop	Death	Archbishop's duties	Other assignments	N.
	Oliviero Carafa	March 10, 1430	November 18, 1458 by Pope Pius II (appointed) December 29, 1458 by Bishop Leone de Simone (consecrated)	January 20, 1511 (aged 80)	Archbishop of Naples (November 18, 1458 – September 20, 1484) (August 4, 1503 – April 1, 1505)	Also Cardinal of the Holy Roman Church	
	Alessandro Carafa	1430	September 20, 1484 by Pope Innocent VIII (appointed)	July 31, 1503 (72–73 years old)	Archbishop of Naples (September 20, 1484 – July 31, 1503)		
	Bernardino Carafa	1472		July 30, 1505 (age 32-33)	Archbishop of Naples (April 1, 1505 – July 30, 1505)	Bishop of Chieti Latin Patriarchate of Alexandria	
	Gianvincenzo Carafa	1477	April 1, 1505 by Pope Julius II (elevated)	August 28, 1541 (63–64 years old)	Archbishop of Naples (1505 – 1530)	Also Cardinal of the Holy Roman Church	
	Francesco Carafa	1515	January 24, 1530 by Pope Clement VII (appointed)	July 30, 1544 (age 28-29)	Archbishop of Naples (January 24, 1530 – July 30, 1544)		
	Gian Pietro Carafa	June 28, 1476	December 22, 1536 by Pope Paul II (elevated)	August 18, 1559 (age 83)	Archbishop of Chieti (1505 – 1518) (1537 – 1549) Archbishop of Brindisi (1518 – 1524) Archbishop of Naples (1549 – 1555)	Archbishop of Chieti (1505–18; 1537–49), of Brindisi (1518–24), of Naples (1549–55) Gian Pietro was, with the name of Paul IV, the 223rd Pope of the Catholic Church from 23 May 1555 until his death.	
	Alfonso Carafa	July 16, 1540	April 9, 1557 by Pope Paul IV (appointed) June 30, 1565 by Bishop Antonio Scarampi (consecrated)	August 29, 1565 (aged 25)	Archbishop of Naples (April 9, 1557 – August 29, 1565)	Also Cardinal of the Holy Roman Church	
	Mario Carafa	???	February 10, 1566 by Cardinal Giovanni Michele Saraceni (consecrated)	September 11, 1576	Archbishop of Naples (October 26, 1565 – September 11, 1576)		
	Decio Carafa	1556	May 17, 1606 by Pope Paul V (appointed) June 4, 1606 by Cardinal Mariano Pierbenedetti (consecrated)	January 23, 1626 (age 69-70)	Archbishop of Naples (January 7, 1613 – January 23, 1626)	Also Cardinal of the Holy Roman Church	
	Gregorio Carafa	1588	June 23, 1664 by Pope Alexander VII (elevated)	February 23, 1675 (86–87 years old)	Archbishop of Salerno (June 23, 1664 – February 23, 1675)		
	Domenico Carafa della Spina di Traetto	July 12, 1805	July 22, 1844 by Pope Gregory XVI (appointed) 11 agosto 1844 dal cardinale Vincenzo Macchi (consecrated)	June 17, 1879 (aged 73)	Metropolitan Archbishop of Benevento (July 22, 1844 – June 17, 1879)	Also Cardinal of the Holy Roman Church	

== Palazzos and other buildings ==
The following is a partial list of the main building holdings and residences of the Carafa family. It includes buildings built on commission by the Carafa family, but also those that were inherited later by this family and built previously by others.

Image	Name	Constructed	Restorations/modifications	Notes	Location	N.
Civil buildings
Campania
	Palazzo Carafa d'Andria	The original was built in the early 15th century.	In the 16th century, having passed to the Confraternity of Monte di Pietà, it was rebuilt by the architect Giovanni Francesco Mormando in the Renaissance style. From the 17th to the 19th century it underwent significant alterations and modifications and an additional floor was added.	The Palace today houses the headquarters of the "Elena di Savoia" Female Technical Institute.	Naples, Italy	
	Palazzo Diomede Carafa (also called Palazzo Santangelo or Palazzo Santangelo-Carafa)	It was built in the 15th century by order of Diomede I Carafa, Count of Maddaloni. It was probably built on an older building, also belonging to the Carafa family.	After the change of ownership, it was restored by the Carafa branch of the Princes of Colobraro.	From the Maddaloni branch, it passed to the Carafa di Colobraro branch. In 1796 Faustina Pignatelli, wife of the Prince of Colobraro, died and it began to decline until 1815, when it was purchased by lawyer Francesco Santangelo and transformed into a museum. It housed the bronze Horse's Head (Protome Carafa) by Donatello, today at the National Archaeological Museum and here replaced by a copy.	Naples, Italy	
	Palazzo Carafa di Montorio	It was built at the end of the 15th century by the Carafa family of the Counts of Montorio al Vomano and attributed to the architect Giovanni Francesco Mormando.	In the 16th century, at the behest of Cardinal Alfonso Carafa, it was rebuilt by the architect Giovanni Francesco di Palma in the Renaissance style and with frescoed rooms.	In 1943 it was damaged by the dramatic explosion of the motor vessel Caterina Costa, then in 1944 it was involved in a fire and finally it was hit by the earthquake of 1980. After decades of degradation, it is currently undergoing recovery work.	Naples, Italy	
	Palazzo Carafa di Santa Severina (also called Palazzo Carafa della Spina a Pizzofalcone)	It was built at the beginning of the 16th century at the behest of Andrea Carafa, Count of Santa Severina.	By now militarized, in the 17th century the military Gran Quartiere di Pizzofalcone was built where the gardens of the Palace then stood.	It later passed to the Loffredo family, then was purchased for the Crown by the Viceroy Íñigo Vélez de Guevara, 8th Count of Oñate, and became the headquarters of the Spanish troops. From 1808 it housed the Military Library and the Topographical Office of the Kingdom of the Two Sicilies. After the unification of Italy it became the Military Archive and today houses the Military Section of the State Archives of Naples.	Naples, Italy	
	Palazzo Carafa di Maddaloni (formerly Palazzo D'Avalos)	It was built at the end of the 16th century at the behest of the Marquess Cesare d'Avalos.	Renovation and embellishment works were entrusted to the architect Cosimo Fanzago at the behest of Don Diomede V Carafa, 5th Duke of Maddaloni and 8th Count of Cerreto; they continued until after 1710 and also involved the marble worker Pietro Sanbarberio and the painters Micco Spadaro, Giacomo del Pò, Francesco Di Maria. From 1766 to 1770 new decorative works were undertaken and other rooms were frescoed by Fedele Fischetti. At the beginning of the 19th century further structural modifications were made. In World War II it was seriously damaged by bombing and restored without any criteria. Damaged again in the 1980 earthquake, a restoration was carried out which lasted more than 30 years.	The Palace passed through several buyers, then in the first half of the 17th century it came into the hands of the Flemish banker Gaspare Roomer who finally sold it to the Carafa family around 1650 in exchange for their Villa Bisignano in Barra. In 1806, in debt, they were forced to sell and the Palace, divided, gradually passed to many and various nobles. The Supreme Court of Justice was located here and, among others, the mayor Luigi Miraglia lived there. Today it is used for residential purposes.	Naples, Italy	
	Palazzo Carafa di Nocera (also called Palazzo Falanga e Montuori)	It was built in the 16th century at the behest of Don Ferdinando II Carafa, 4th Duke of Nocera, based on a design by the architect Gabriele d'Agnolo.	The families of the merchants Falanga and Montuori, the new owners, entrusted the restoration of the Palace to the architect De Leva, who erased the Renaissance features of the building.	At the end of the 17th century, the Palace passed to the Costanzo family and then to the Caracciolo di Villa. After a period of abandonment, in 1806 with the arrival of the French it became the seat of the Prefecture of Police until Palazzo San Giacomo was completed in 1825. It was later purchased by the merchant families Falanga and Montuori. The Palace is now used for residential purposes.	Naples, Italy	
	Palazzo Carafa di Belvedere	It was built in the 16th century by the Carafa family of the Princes of Belvedere, but was never completed by them.	The Palace was never completed by the Carafas, as Prince Carlo Carafa of Belvedere married Elisabetta van den Eynde, daughter of the magnate Ferdinando van den Eynde, and received from his wife Villa Belvedere in Vomero as a dowry, where he moved.	In 1830 the Palace was purchased by Don Giuseppe Sorge, who wanted to complete it at his own expense on the occasion of his wedding. The Palace no longer exists, as it was almost completely destroyed during the bombings of World War II.	No longer exists	
	Palazzo Carafa della Spina (once also called Palazzo di Fabrizio Carafa)	It was built at the end of the 16th century by order of Don Fabrizio Carafa della Spina, Prince of Butera and Roccella, who purchased and demolished a palace belonging to Andrea Matteo IV Acquaviva d'Aragona. The design was probably the work of the architect Domenico Fontana.	The Palace was restored in the 18th century and the sumptuous entrance portal was also rebuilt from scratch, according to some the work of Martino Buonocore or Ferdinando Sanfelice.	The palace is now used for residential purposes.	Naples, Italy	
	Palazzo Cellammare (or Palazzo Cellamare; in the past also briefly called Palazzo Francavilla)	It was built in the 16th century at the behest of the abbot Giovanni Francesco Carafa.	Subsequently, in 1531, Luigi Carafa commissioned the architect Ferdinando Manlio to completely restore the building. From 1668 to 1670 the architect Francesco Antonio Picchiatti carried out some internal modernization works, having already worked there before, in 1651, with the construction of the monumental staircase, later demolished to be replaced by another by Giovanni Battista Manni. The monumental portal, which leads to the staircase, is the work of Ferdinando Fuga. The Chapel of the Virgin from 1727 is instead the work of Giovan Battista Nauclerio.	The Palace was sacked during the Masaniello revolt in 1647, then served as a lazaretto during the plague epidemic of 1656 and in 1689 it became state property. In the 18th century it was then purchased by Antonio del Giudice, Prince of Cellamare, and subsequently passed to Michele Imperiali, Prince of Francavilla; under the latter the Palace collected a refined lounge, among whose guests we remember the friend Giacomo Casanova. Finally, the mathematician Renato Caccioppoli lived here and committed suicide in 1959.	Naples, Italy	
	Palazzo Carafa di Roccella (today called Palazzo delle Arti di Napoli)	It was built in the 17th century by the Di Sangro family.	In the 18th century, the Carafa dei Principi di Roccella carried out a renovation that was entrusted to the local architect Luca Vecchione, but the work dragged on for a long time and only in 1842 was the neoclassical façade completed. In the 19th century, it took on its current appearance with the addition of the third floor, the uncovered atrium and the patio overlooking the garden. After many years of abandonment, in 1964 the entrepreneur Mario Ottieri attempted to demolish it, fortunately in vain. A recent restoration, costing €20 million, was completed in 2004.	The Palace was donated by the owner Francesco di Sangro, Prince of Sansevero, to his brother-in-law Don Giuseppe Carafa, who had married his sister Antonia di Sangro. It then passed to the Carafa branch of the Princes of Roccella. Ippolita Cantelmo Stuart, wife of Prince Vincenzo III Carafa, animated a famous literary salon there. Owned by the Italian State, it is now the seat of the PAN.	Naples, Italy	
	Palazzo Carafa di Noja	There is no information about the time of construction or about the client of the palace. It can be assumed that it was erected in the first half of the 17th century.	In the first decades of the 19th century, the Carafas of Noja carried out a profound renovation of the double building in neoclassical style and rebuilt a new villa at the end of the garden, according to the neo-Pompeian fashion of the time.	In the 18th century it became the property of the Carafa branch of the Dukes of Noja, as evidenced by the coat of arms frescoed in the entrance hall. In the second half of the 19th century the Carafas sold the Palace, starting the process of division that still makes it a private condominium and therefore not visitable.	Naples, Italy	
	Palazzo Carafa di Policastro (today known as Palazzo Caracciolo di Torella)	It was built in the 18th century by the Carafa dei Dukes of Forlì and Counts of Policastro.		From the Carafa it later passed to the Caracciolo dei Principi di Torella. In a hall on the main floor there is a frescoed ceiling by Fedele Fischetti, in another of the paintings above the doors by Giacinto Diano. Today it is divided up and used as a prestigious condominium.	Naples, Italy	
	Villa Carafa di Belvedere (or simply Villa Belvedere; formerly Palazzo Vandeneynde)	It was built at the end of the 17th century by the architect Fra' Bonaventura Presti, at the behest of the Italian-Flemish magnate Ferdinando van den Eynde, 1st Marquess of Castelnuovo.	Further changes were made by the Carafas in the 19th century. There are frescoes there, for example, by Luca Giordano.	The Villa passed to the Carafa family through the marriage of Elisabetta van den Eynde, daughter of the Marquis Ferdinando van den Eynde, who married Don Carlo Carafa, Prince of Belvedere, bringing the Villa as a dowry.	Naples, Italy	
	Villa Carafa d'Andria de Cillis (formerly Palazzo de Cillis)	The original was built in the late 18th century by the De Cillis family.	Of the original building, only the cellars buried in the lava rock and a rustic well survive today. The current Villa is the one commissioned by the Marchioness Eleonora Carafa d'Andria, married to de Cillis, who in 1918 transformed it into a summer residence in neoclassical - liberty style.	In the 20th century it was a meeting place for noble Neapolitan families. When the Marchioness died in 1973, it began a long decline that led to decay and thefts, also becoming a nursery-primary school, until in 2013 restoration and recovery works began and today it is home to a B&B.	Torre del Greco, Italy	
Calabria
	Castello di Roccella Ionica (also known as Palazzo Carafa)				Roccella Ionica, Italy	
	Castello di Santa Severina (also called Castello Carafa or Castello di Roberto il Guiscardo)	It was built in the 11th century at the behest of Robert Guiscard, of the Norman Hauteville lineage.	The Angevins are credited with modernizing the Castle: they built the cylindrical towers and the four curtain walls that delimit the keep. With the arrival of Andrea Carafa, the Castle underwent one of the most impressive modernization works, far superior to that of the Angevins. The Grutthers also intervened on the castle, which became a true noble residence. From 1994 to 1998 it was subjected to careful and meticulous restoration.	After the Normans, came the Angevins, then the Aragonese. From the beginning of the 16th century it came into possession of the Carafa family, to then return to the hands of the Royal Court. In the 17th century it passed to the Ruffo family, then the Sculco family bought it, and finally it passed to the Grutther family, who held it until 1806. Today the Castle can be visited and is home to the Archaeological Museum, the Documentation Centre for Studies on Calabrese Castles and Fortifications, and the Museum of Contemporary Art (MACSS)	Santa Severina, Italy	
Apulia
	Castel del Monte (formerly called Castello di Santa Maria del Monte)	The Castle was built in the 13th century by the famous Frederick II, Duke of Swabia, Emperor of the Holy Roman Empire and King of Sicily.	In 1528, due to a French expedition in the Kingdom of Naples, the Castle was devastated and bombed. Passed to the Carafa family, from the 18th century a long period of abandonment followed and it was stripped of its furnishings and marble decorations. Having become state property, restoration work began in 1879, then in 1928 and again between 1975 and 1981.	It was rarely used for parties and among these in 1246 we remember the wedding of Violante of Swabia with Riccardo Sanseverino, Count of Caserta. It also served as a prison. It was purchased in 1552 by the Carafa family, who used it as a holiday resort and set up a bakery with a mill and an oven, but then it underwent a long period of decay until 1876, when it was purchased by the Italian State. Since 1996 it has been included in the UNESCO list of World Heritage Sites.	Andria, Italy	

== Bibliography ==
- Gaetano Moroni, Dizionario di erudizione Storico - Ecclesiastica, Vol. IX , Venezia, Tipografia Emiliana, 1841
- Benedetto Minichini, Del cognome e dello scudo dei Carafa, Nobili Napoletani , Napoli, Stabilimento tipografico del Cav. Gaetano Nobile, 1860
- Berardo Candida-Gonzaga, Memorie delle famiglie nobili delle province meridionali d'Italia, G. de Angelis, 1883
- Tullio Torriani, Una tragedia nel cinquecento romano: Paolo IV e i suoi nepoti , Roma, Fratelli Palombi, 1951
- Donata Chiomenti Vassalli, Paolo IV e il processo Carafa: un caso d'ingiusta giustizia nel cinquecento, Milano, Mursia, 1993
- Volker Reinhardt, Le grandi famiglie italiane, Vicenza, Neri Pozzi, 1996
- Luigi Perego Salvioni, Collezione di carte pubbliche, proclami, editti, ragionamenti ed altre produzioni tendenti a consolidare la rigenerata Repubblica Romana, 1798
- Album biografico di Roma, Roma, Pallotta, 1875
- Angelo de Gubernatis, Dictionnaire International des écrivains du monde latin , Firenze, Società Tipografica Fiorentina, 1905
- Felice Ottavio Caraffa, Alla Camera dei Deputati del Regno d'Italia e per essa all'Onorevolissimo Signor Comm. Giuseppe Biancheri Presidente - Petizione, Roma, Mugnoz, 1886
- Vittorio Spreti, Enciclopedia storico-nobiliare italiana, Arnaldo Forni, 1981
- Franco Muscolini, Così eravamo, Tolentino, La Linotype, 2006
- Franco Muscolini, Così eravamo - seconda parte, Tolentino, La Linotype, 2008
