= Pescopagano =

Pescopagano Petra Pagana
- Comune
- Comune di Pescopagano
- Location within Italy Location within Basilicata
- Coordinates: 40°50′09.8″N 15°23′55.8″E
- Country: Italy
- Region: Basilicata
- Province: Potenza (PZ)
- Frazioni: Caperroni, Nerico, Bosco delle Rose, Focarete, Piano Marzano

Government
  - Mayor: Crescenzo Schettini

Area
  - Total: 69.84 km^{2} (26.97 sq mi)
- Elevation: 954 m (3,130 ft)

Population (31 March 2018)
  - Total: 1,844
  - Density: 26.40/km^{2} (68.38/sq mi)
- Demonym: Pescopaganesi
- Time zone: UTC+1 (CET)
  - Summer (DST): UTC+2 (CEST)
- Postal code: 85020
- Dialing code: 0976
- ISTAT code: 076058
- Patron saint: St. Francis of Paola
- Saint day: June 30
- Website: Official website

Pescopagano (Lucano: Piscupagàne) is a town and comune in the province of Potenza, in the region of Basilicata (southern Italy). It is bounded by the comuni of Cairano, Calitri, Castelgrande, Castelnuovo di Conza, Conza della Campania, Laviano, Rapone, Sant'Andrea di Conza, Santomenna.

== Main sights ==
- Torre dell'Orologio (Watch Tower), built on the ancient Porta Sibilla (Sybil's Gate) of the walls. It houses a Roman bust of Ianus.
- Il castello (the Castle) was more properly an ancient fortress under Conza.
- Church of San Giovanni Battista (970).
- Church of Montemauro.
- Church of San Leonardo.
- Church of SS. Annunziata.
- Church of San Lorenzo in Tufara and adjacent abbey ruins.
- Church of SS. Incoronata.
- Church of Madonna delle Grazie (once dedicated to Saint Antony).
