= Guglielmo Gasparrini =

Italian botanist (1803–1866)

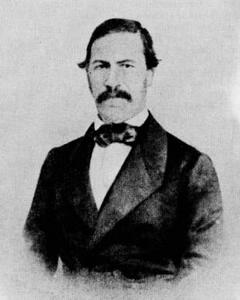
- Born: 3 January 1803; Castelgrande, Basilicata, Kingdom of Naples
- Died: 28 June 1866 (aged 63); Naples, Campania, Kingdom of Italy
- Scientific career
- Fields: Botany, Mycology

Guglielmo Gasparrini (3 January 1803 – 28 June 1866) was an Italian botanist and mycologist.

== Biography ==
Guglielmo Gasparrini was born in Castelgrande, in the Province of Potenza. After his first studies in his native town, he moved to Naples to attend the veterinary school. Subsequently, he entered the Botanical Garden of Naples, under the guide of Michele Tenore and Giovanni Gussone.

Graduating in the physical and natural sciences, he was professor of botany at the University of Naples. From 1857 to 1861, he taught at the University of Pavia, of which he was also magnificent rector (Magnífico Reitor). After returning to Naples, he was director of the Neapolitan Botanical Garden from 1861 to 1866.

Gasparrini was a member of several scientific institutes such as the French Academy of Sciences, the Accademia Pontaniana, and the Academy of Physical and Mathematical Sciences of Naples, of which he was appointed president until 1862. He died in Naples in 1866.

== Selected works ==
- Osservazioni sopra talune modificazioni organiche in alcune cellule vegetali, Naples, Stamperia del Fibreno, 1863
- Ricerche sulla Embriogenia della Canapa, Naples, 1863
- Ricerche sulla natura dei succiatori e la escrezione delle radici ed osservazioni morfologiche sopra taluni organi della Lemna minor, Naples, Tip.Dura, 1856;
- Ricerche sulla natura del caprifico, del fico e sulla caprificazione, Naples, tip. Di Aquila/Puzziello, 1845
- Ricerche sulla natura degli Stomi, Naples, 1842
- Ricerche sulla natura della pietra jungja e sul fungo che vi soprannasce, Naples, Gerolomini, 1841
- Descrizione di un nuovo genere di piante della famiglia delle Leguminose, Naples, 1836
