= Loffreda =

Loffreda is an Italian surname from Lazio and Campania, derived from the given name Goffredo (Geoffrey). Notable people with the surname include:

- Marcelo Loffreda (born 1959), Argentine rugby union footballer and coach
- Mauricio Loffreda (born 1990), Uruguayan footballer
- Stanislao Loffreda (1932–2025), Italian Franciscan friar, Bible scholar and archaeologist
- Tony Loffreda (born 1962), Canadian politician and former banker

== See also ==
- Loffredo
