= Cairano =

- Comune
- Comune di Cairano
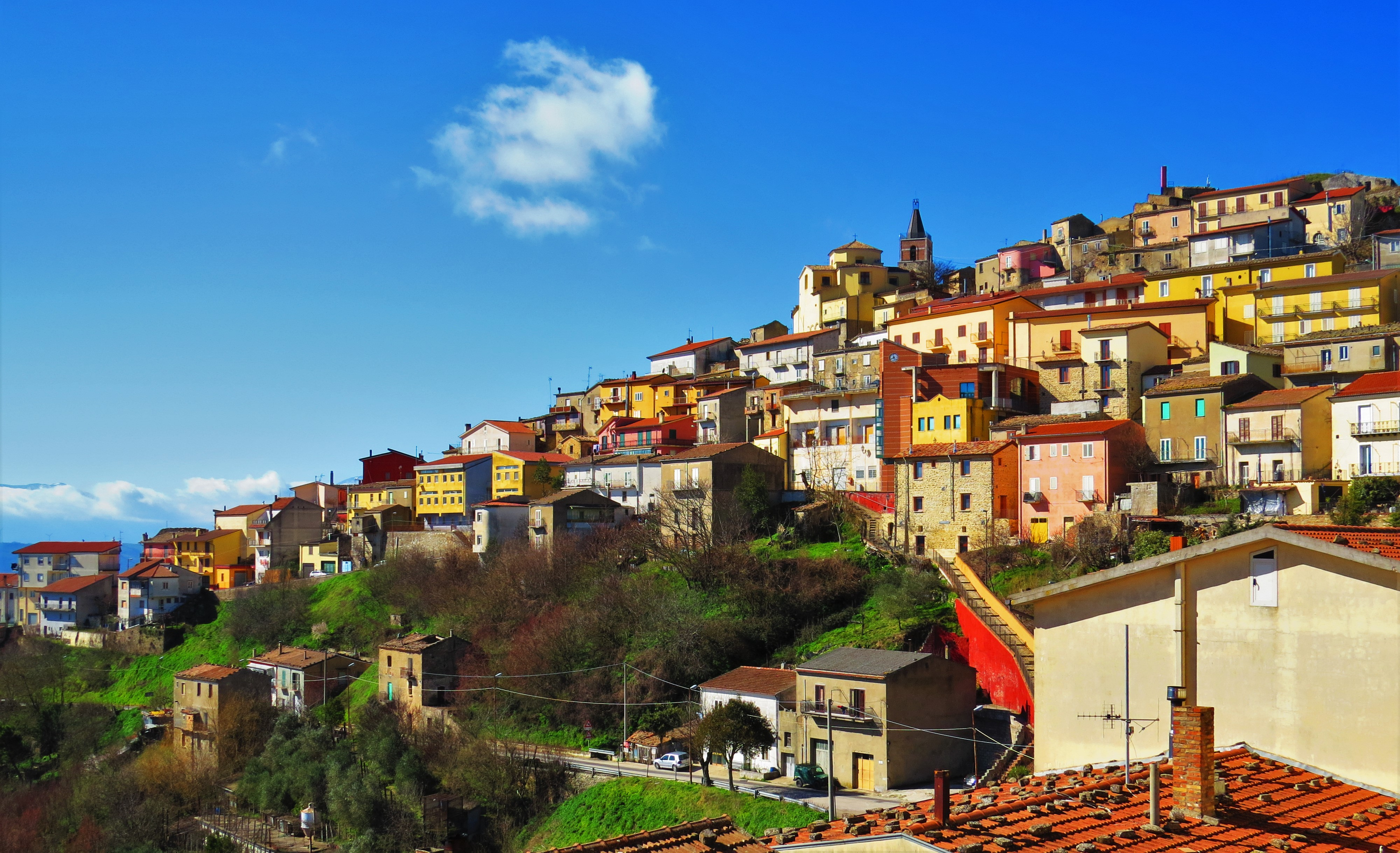

- Location within Italy Location within Campania
- Coordinates: 40°53′52″N 15°22′16″E
- Country: Italy
- Region: Campania
- Province: Avellino (AV)
- Frazioni: Andretta, Calitri, Conza della Campania, Pescopagano (PZ)

Area
  - Total: 13.83 km^{2} (5.34 sq mi)
- Elevation: 770 m (2,530 ft)

Population (1 June 2009)
  - Total: 379
  - Density: 27.4/km^{2} (71.0/sq mi)
- Demonym: Cairanesi
- Time zone: UTC+1 (CET)
  - Summer (DST): UTC+2 (CEST)
- Postal code: 83040
- Dialing code: 0827
- ISTAT code: 064013
- Patron saint: San Leone Magno
- Saint day: 10 November
- Website: Official website

Cairano (Irpino: Cariàne) is a town (commune) in the province of Avellino, Campania, Italy.
