= San Fele =

- Comune
- Comune di San Fele
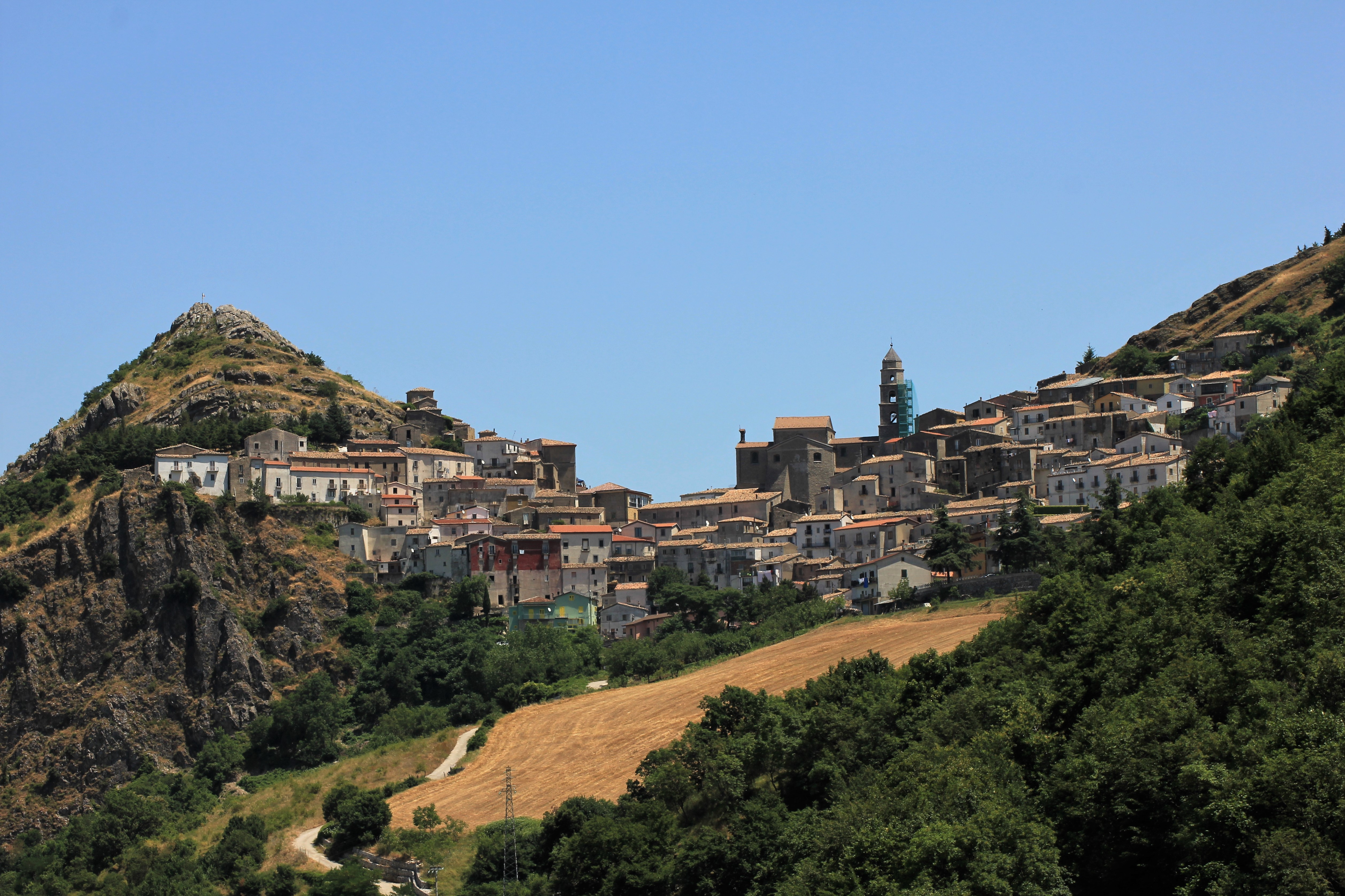
- View of San Fele

- Coat of arms

- Location within Italy Location within Basilicata
- Coordinates: 40°49′N 15°32′E
- Country: Italy
- Region: Basilicata
- Province: Potenza (PZ)
- Frazioni: Agrifoglio, Armatieri, Difesa, Cecci, Montagna, Pierno, Priore, Masone, Signorella, Cerrito

Area
  - Total: 97.7 km^{2} (37.7 sq mi)
- Elevation: 872 m (2,861 ft)

Population (30 November 2015)
  - Total: 3,002
  - Density: 30.7/km^{2} (79.6/sq mi)
- Demonym: Sanfelesi
- Time zone: UTC+1 (CET)
  - Summer (DST): UTC+2 (CEST)
- Postal code: 85020
- Dialing code: 0976
- ISTAT code: 076076
- Patron saint: Saint Justin de Jacobis and Saint Sebastian
- Saint day: 31 July and 20 January
- Website: Official website

San Fele is a town and comune in the province of Potenza in the Basilicata region of southern Italy.

== Geography ==
San Fele is a picturesque stone village located at the saddle between two mountain peaks, Monte Toretta and Monte Castello, and overlooking the Vitalba Valley. The comune (municipality) of San Fele is part of the Comunità montana del Vulture, which makes it a gateway to the Vulture section of the province of Potenza in the state of Basilicata, Italy, which is famous for its excellent and economical aglianico wines. San Fele is also the trailhead for hikes to lovely waterfalls. The municipality of San Fele is adjacent to Atella, Bella, Castelgrande, Filiano, Muro Lucano, Rapone and Ruvo del Monte. San Fele includes the frazioni (hamlets) of Agrifoglio, Armatieri, Cecci, Cerrito, Difesa, Montagna, Pierno, Priore, Masone, Signorella. It is also a short drive from Melfi and Melfi Castle. San Fele is about thirty-five miles east of Salerno, and is about a two hour drive from Naples or four hours from Rome.

== History ==
Inhabited since ancient times by woodsmen and called Lucania by the ancient Greeks and Romans, the actual city of San Fele originated in 969, with the construction of an octagonal fortified castle on what is now called Monte Castello, commissioned by Otto I of Saxony to repel potential attacks by the Byzantines who ruled Southern Italy at the time. The area was seen as strategically important because the Crocelle Pass, the southern passage through the Apennine Mountains lies in the northeast corner of the Comune (municipality) of San Fele. From ancient times this Pass functioned as a major trade route between Salerno in the West and Bari in the East, both major trading ports. The route was also a major pathway for Crusaders and Pilgrims to the "Holy Land".

San Fele was named by the workers who built the fortress, and were from Venosa, an ancient Roman city also in Basilicata. They dedicated the fortress to their protector-saint, Saint Felix (San Felice), which has been shortened to Fele.

In the aftermath of the unification of Italy during the 1840s, much of the local population was displaced, and the area was affected by banditry. Famous brigands included Giovanni Fortunato, known as "Coppa", Vito Di Gianni, called "Totaro" and Francesco Fasanella, called "Tinna", who were part of the infamous Carmine Crocco. A television miniseries about these infamous highway bandits, Il generale dei briganti, was made in 2012.

As a result of this upheaval, and partly due to drought, deforestation and a devastating earthquake, San Fele was part of the large emigration of the late 19th century (to North and South America). A large number emigrated to the United States, including New York City, Buffalo, New York and Newark, New Jersey, Canada, Brazil and Argentina. In addition, after the upheaval of World War II, and particularly in the 1950s and '60s, many San Felese emigrated (to Argentina, Australia, Brazil, Germany, Switzerland, and northern Italy). Currently, the population of San Fele is about 3,000 people, down from over 10,000 in the 1870s.

The primary industry in San Fele is agriculture. The area features woodlands and hiking trails, and is known for the fertility of its volcanic soil which produces aglianico wines, as well as mushrooms, truffles, cheese, game, and handmade pasta. Although much of the area was deforested due to a timber boom during the 19th century and to clear land for farming, part of the Comune of San Fele includes a national park with forestland dominated by oak, maple, beech and mountain pine. Because San Fele is located at a higher altitude, it has a cooler summer climate and features waterfalls or "cascade".

San Fele feast days include:

- January 20: Feast of the Patron Saint Sebastian.
- 31 July: Feast of San Giustino de Jacobis.
- 15 August: Feast of the Madonna of Pierno.

San Fele hosts the Feast of Madonna di Pierno, which has been celebrated since 1139 AD, in August. San Fele is also known as the birthplace of San Giustino de Jacobis (on 9 October 1800), whose home has been restored and is now a destination for pilgrims.

== Famous residents ==
- Giustino de Jacobis, Italian missionary.
- Beniamino Bufano, Italian American sculptor.
- William Edmunds, Italian American actor.

== Twin towns ==
- (Italy) Muro Lucano, since 6 April 2010
- (Italy) Bologna, since 27 January 1981
- (Australia) Drummoyne, since 1985
