= Sant'Arcangelo =

- Comune
- Comune di Sant'Arcangelo
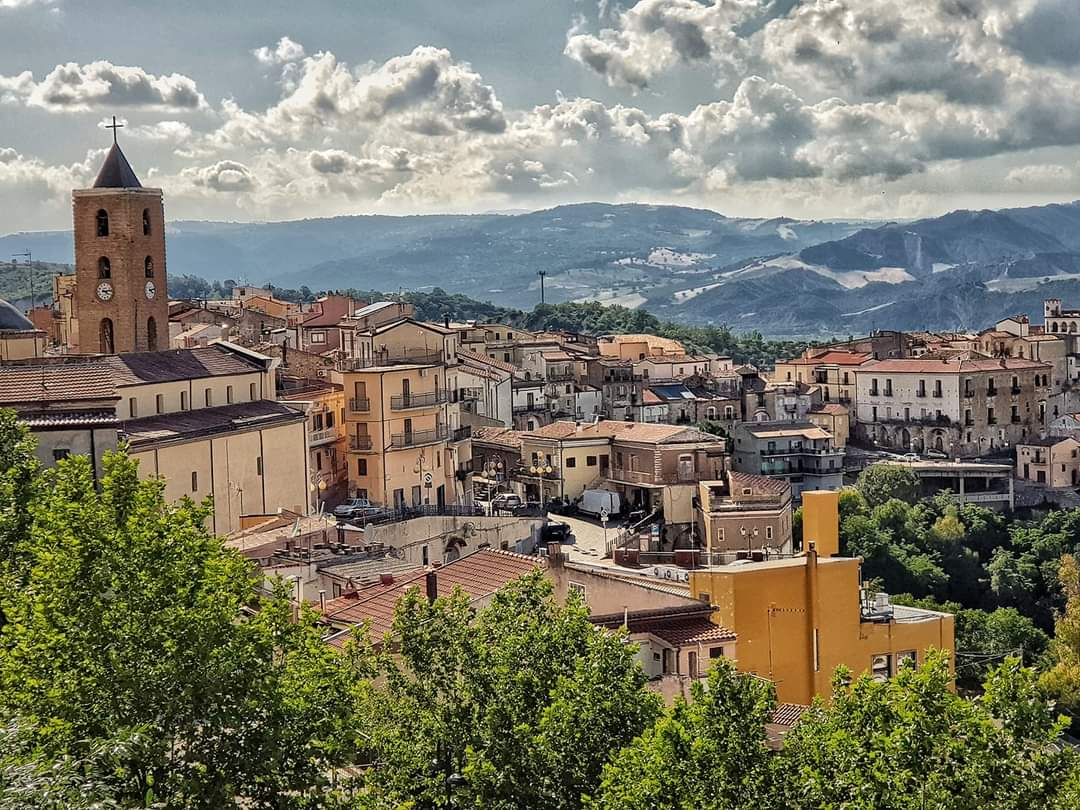
- View of Sant'Arcangelo

- Location within Italy Location within Basilicata
- Coordinates: 40°15′N 16°16′E
- Country: Italy
- Region: Basilicata
- Province: Potenza (PZ)
- Frazioni: San Brancato

Government
  - Mayor: Vincenzo Nicola Parisi

Area
  - Total: 89 km^{2} (34 sq mi)
- Elevation: 388 m (1,273 ft)

Population (December 2008)
  - Total: 6,548
  - Density: 74/km^{2} (190/sq mi)
- Demonym: Santarcangiolesi
- Time zone: UTC+1 (CET)
  - Summer (DST): UTC+2 (CEST)
- Postal code: 85037
- Dialing code: 0973
- ISTAT code: 076080
- Patron saint: St. Michael Archangel
- Saint day: 8 May
- Website: Official website

Sant'Arcangelo is a town and comune in the province of Potenza, in the southern Italian region of Basilicata.

== Notable people ==
- Vito De Filippo
- Michele Giordano
