= Toral de los Guzmanes =

- Municipality
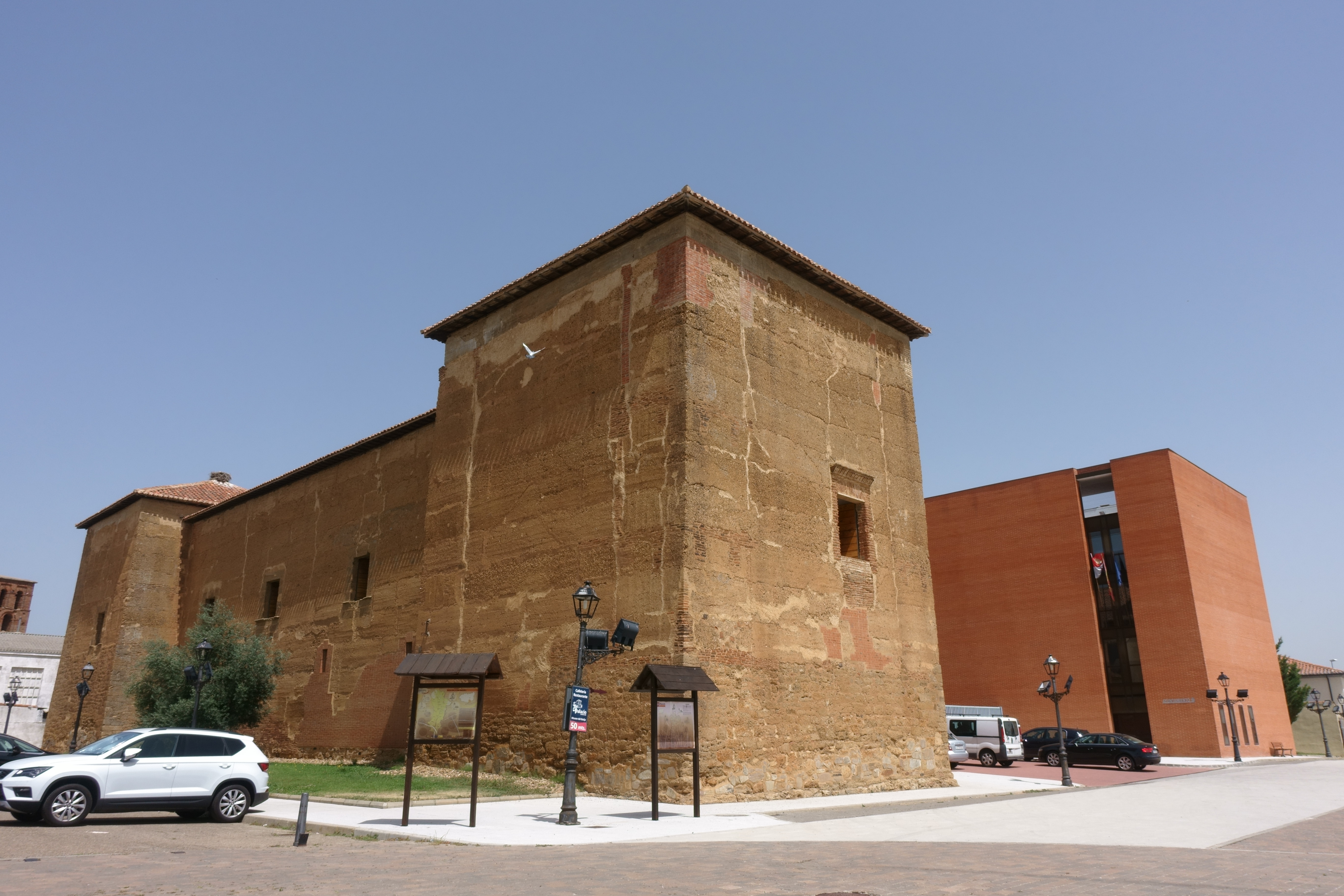
- Palace of the Guzmanes, in Toral de los Guzmanes.

- Flag Coat of arms

- Location of Toral de los Guzmanes. Toral de los Guzmanes (Spain)
- Coordinates: 42°15′N 5°34′W
- Country: Spain
- Community: Castile and León
- Province: Province of León
- Comarca: Vega de Toral

Government
  - Mayor: Miguel Ángel Fernández Martínez (PP)

Area
  - Total: 21.11 km^{2} (8.15 sq mi)

Population (2023)
  - Total: 499
  - Density: 23.6/km^{2} (61.2/sq mi)
- Time zone: UTC+1 (CET)
  - Summer (DST): UTC+2 (CEST)
- Postal code: 24237
- Website: www.aytotoraldelosguzmanes.es

Toral of the Guzmanes is a municipality located in the south of the province of León, in the autonomous community of Castile and León, Spain. It belongs to the so denominated region of Esla-Oteros. Its surface is of about 21 km^{2}. In 2023, it had a population of 499 inhabitants according to the INE.

== Geography ==
The landscape of the town is the one of a fertile valley, drilled during thousands of years by the Esla river that delimits to the east its extension. The limit on the west is demarcated by the slope that separates the town from the Paramo Leonés. This one slope has a stony land strip, that years ago was full of vineyard fields, today missing in its totality, only remaining the warehouses, colorful constructions dug in the Earth. The fertile valley extends from the north to the south, being Villademor de la Vega and Algadefe the populations that delimit Toral in this direction. The farming territories are fertile, partly due to the work of the farmers during hundreds of years of work, and partly by the wealth of the land and the abundance of water. The climate is typically continental, with extreme temperatures in winter and summer.

== Economy ==
Toral is a locality eminently agriculturist and cattle dealer, with a percentage of the population dedicating to the construction industry and other services, mainly due to the proximity to the capital, to Valencia de Don Juan and to Benavente, that monopolize these activities.

== Transportation ==
Toral is located in National 630 between León, Spain, which is 42 km away and Benavente, Zamora, to a distance of about 28 km, in also known as Via de la Plata, and 9 km away from Valencia de Don Juan, the local head, to which is connected by means of a local road, the CV-232. In addition the town gets exit to the A-66 highway that links León and Benavente.
