= Medina de las Torres =

- municipality
- Coat of arms

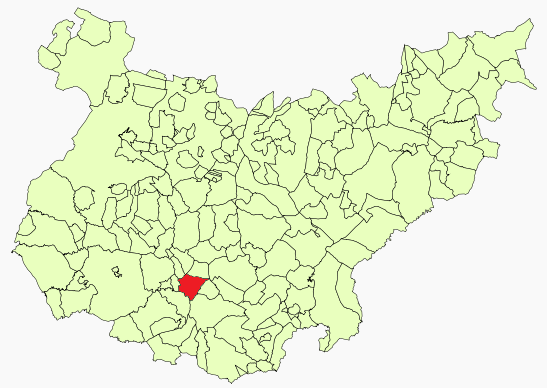
- Location in Badajoz

- Location of Medina de las Torres within Extremadura
- Coordinates: 38°20′37″N 6°24′42″W
- Country: Spain
- Autonomous community: Extremadura
- Province: Badajoz
- Municipality: Medina de las Torres

Area
  - Total: 87.4 km^{2} (33.7 sq mi)
- Elevation: 529 m (1,736 ft)

Population (2025-01-01)
  - Total: 1,160
  - Density: 13.3/km^{2} (34.4/sq mi)
- Time zone: UTC+1 (CET)
  - Summer (DST): UTC+2 (CEST)

Medina de las Torres is a municipality located in the province of Badajoz, Extremadura, Spain. According to the 2005 census (INE), the municipality has a population of 1403 inhabitants.

== See also ==
- List of municipalities in Badajoz
