= Pietravairano =

- Comune
- Comune di Pietravairano
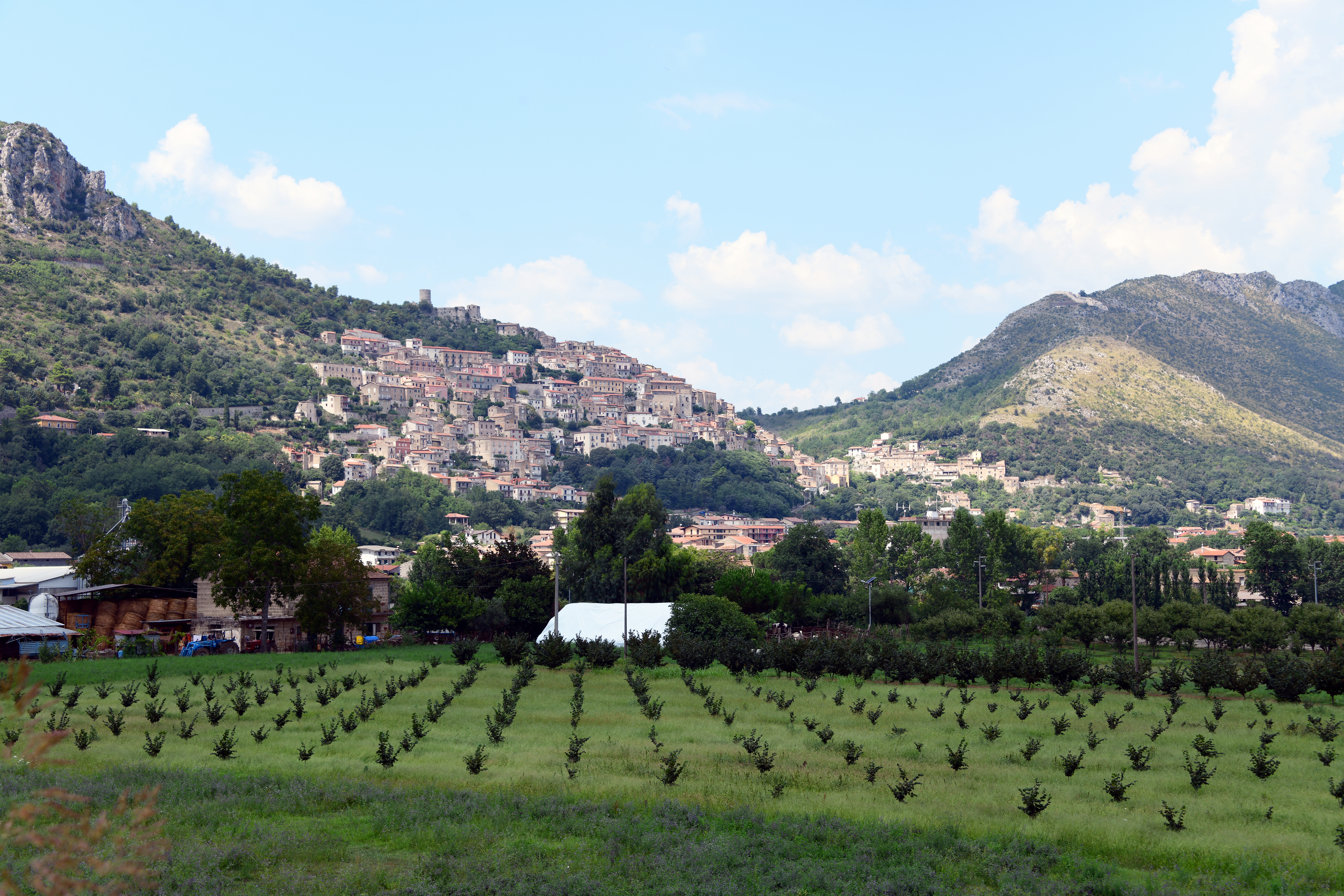

- Location within Italy Location within Campania
- Coordinates: 41°20′N 14°10′E
- Country: Italy
- Region: Campania
- Province: Caserta (CE)
- Frazioni: San Felice

Government
  - Mayor: Francesco Zarone

Area
  - Total: 33.2 km^{2} (12.8 sq mi)
- Elevation: 258 m (846 ft)

Population (31 March 2017)
  - Total: 2,981
  - Density: 89.8/km^{2} (233/sq mi)
- Demonym: Pietravairanesi
- Time zone: UTC+1 (CET)
  - Summer (DST): UTC+2 (CEST)
- Postal code: 81050
- Dialing code: 0823
- Website: Official website

Pietravairano is a comune (municipality) in the province of Caserta in the Italian region Campania, located about 60 kilometres (37 mi) north of Naples and about 35 kilometres (22 mi) northwest of Caserta.

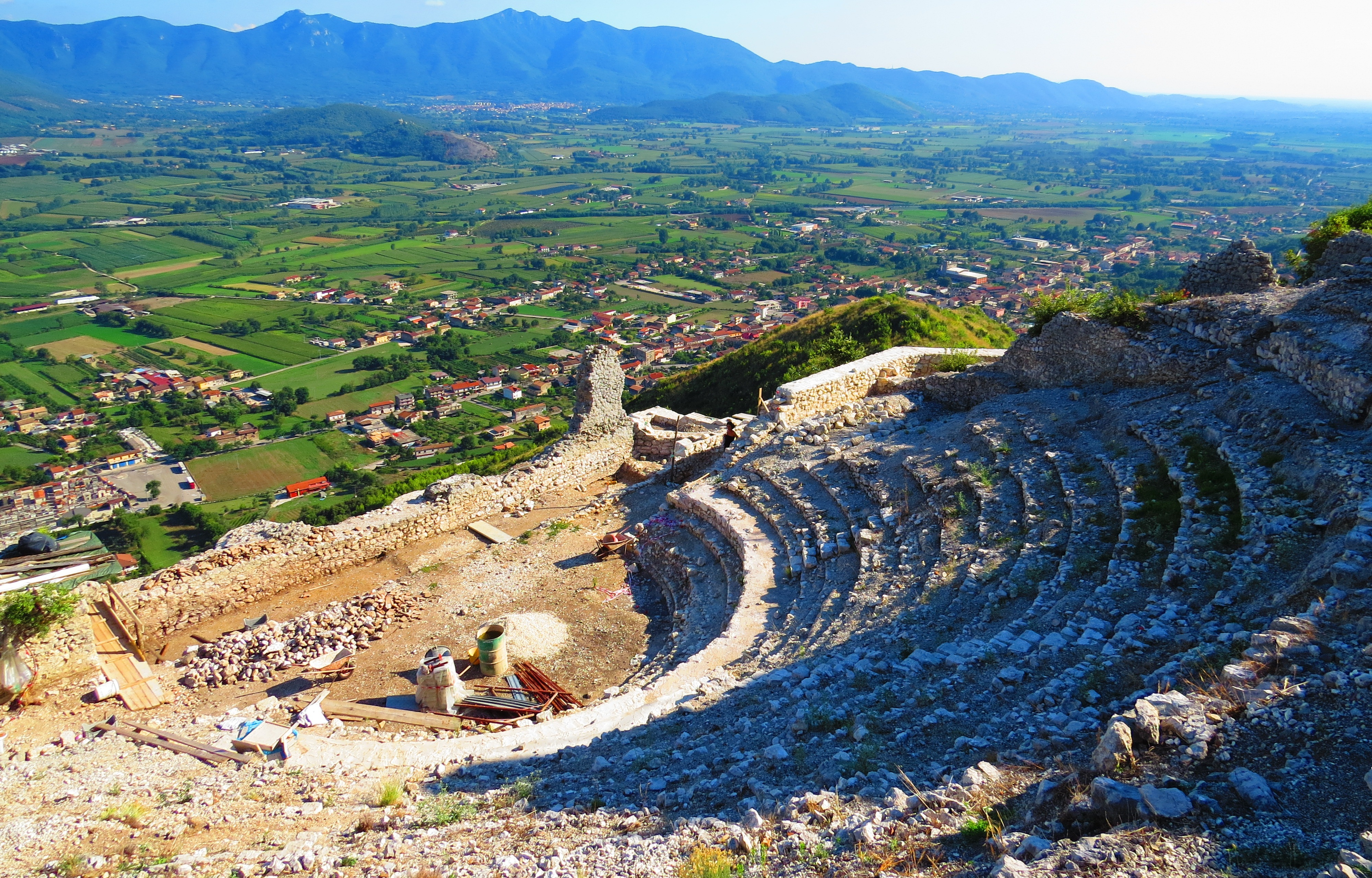
Roman theatre of Pietravairano

The comune is known for its Roman theatre, found north of the town on Monte San Nicola.
