= Loffredo =

Loffredo is an Italian surname from Campania, derived from the given name Goffredo (Geoffrey). Notable people with the surname include:

- Anthony Loffredo (born c. 1988), French extreme body modification artist
- Carlo Loffredo (1635–1701), Italian Roman Catholic prelate
- Cecilia Loffredo (born 2008), Danish actress
- Chris Loffredo Hayes (born 1979), American political commentator and television news anchor
- Enrico Loffredo (1507–1547), Italian Roman Catholic prelate
- Itala Maria Loffredo D'Ottaviano (born 1944), Brazilian mathematical logician
- Todd Loffredo, American table football player
- Yela Loffredo (1924–2020), Ecuadorian sculptor, academic and museum director

== See also ==
- Loffreda
