= Sant'Angelo a Scala =

- Comune
- Comune di Sant'Angelo a Scala
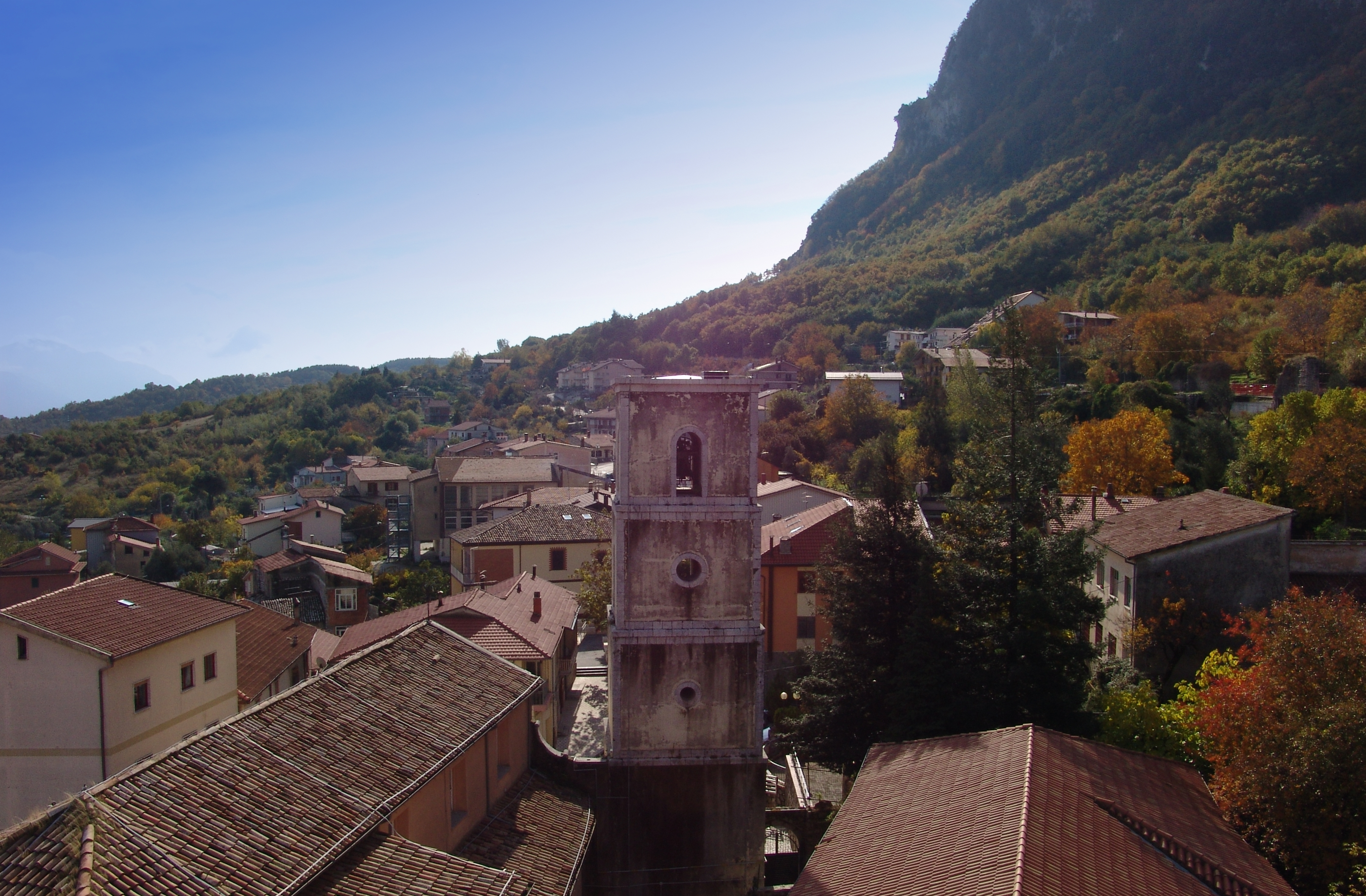

- Location within Italy Location within Campania
- Coordinates: 40°59′N 14°44′E
- Country: Italy
- Region: Campania
- Province: Avellino (AV)

Government
  - Mayor: Carmine De Fazio

Area
  - Total: 10.75 km^{2} (4.15 sq mi)
- Elevation: 582 m (1,909 ft)

Population (31 December 2017)
  - Total: 737
  - Density: 68.6/km^{2} (178/sq mi)
- Demonym: Santangiolesi
- Time zone: UTC+1 (CET)
  - Summer (DST): UTC+2 (CEST)
- Postal code: 83010
- Dialing code: 0825
- Website: Official website

Sant'Angelo a Scala is a town and comune in the province of Avellino, Campania, southern Italy. It is an agricultural center surrounded by woods largely composed of chestnut and hazelnut.
