= Castelgrande, Basilicata =

Castelgrande
- Comune
- Comune di Castelgrande
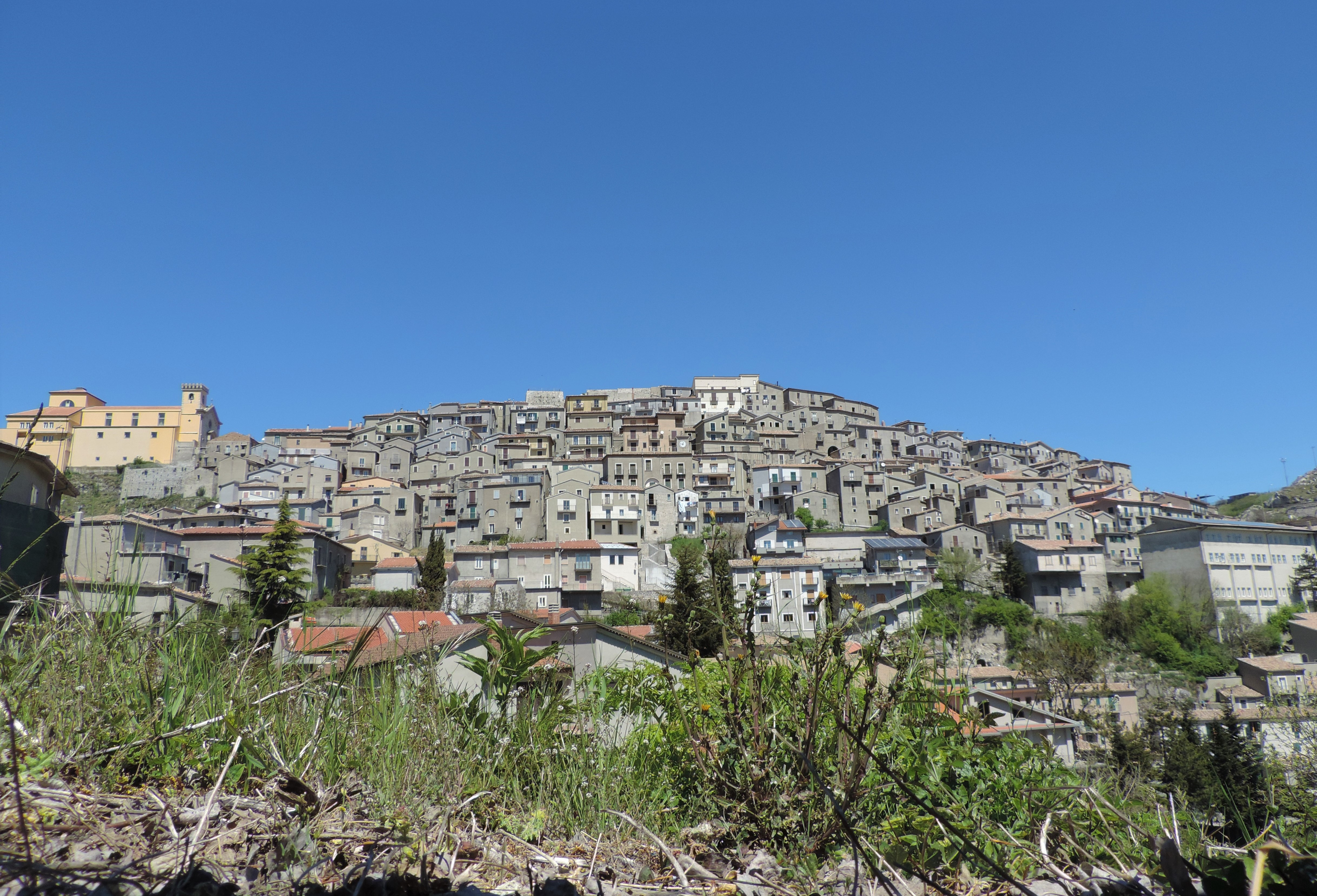
- View of Castelgrande, Basilicata

- Location within Italy Location within Basilicata
- Coordinates: 40°47′N 15°26′E
- Country: Italy
- Region: Basilicata
- Province: Potenza (PZ)

Government
  - Mayor: Alberto Muro

Area
  - Total: 34 km^{2} (13 sq mi)
- Elevation: 962 m (3,156 ft)

Population (31 December 2005)
  - Total: 1,211
  - Density: 36/km^{2} (92/sq mi)
- Demonym: Castelgrandesi
- Time zone: UTC+1 (CET)
  - Summer (DST): UTC+2 (CEST)
- Postal code: 85050
- Dialing code: 0976
- ISTAT code: 076021
- Saint day: July 5
- Website: Official website

Castelgrande is a town and comune in the province of Potenza, in the Southern Italian region of Basilicata. It is bounded by the comuni of Laviano, Muro Lucano, Pescopagano, Rapone, San Fele.

Castelgrande is part of the Comunita' Montana di Marmo Melandro, previously part of the Comunita' Montana di Marmo Platano.

== History ==
=== Origins and the Norman-Swabian period ===
According to some hypotheses, the origins of Castelgrande date back to the early Middle Ages: Nicola Cianci di Leo Sanseverino believes, in fact, that they date back to the 10th century as a result of the devastation carried out by the Saracens who "destroyed the two lands of S. Pietro a Piegara and S. Varva, the first to the southeast and the other to the north of Muro and Castelgrande"; Francesco Masi also places the origins of Castelgrande between the 9th and 10th centuries, at the time of the reconquest of much of Lucania by the imperial forces under Basil I of Macedon. Towards the end of the Lombard rule, the territory of Castelgrande belonged to Guy of Sorrento, the last gastald of Conza, who in 1058/1059 gave his daughter Maria in marriage to William of Hauteville (1027-1080), thus favoring the transition of the new Norman ruling class. William inherited from Guy all the possessions in the Principality of Salerno and received from his brother Humphrey of Hauteville, Count of Puglia and Calabria, the great County of the Principality (1060-1156) as well as the title of comes of Eboli, where the seat of the county court was placed. The territory of Castelgrande, located along the Laviano - San Fele route, guarded the border with the County of Conza, located to the north. Around 1080 Robert, firstborn of William of Hauteville, succeeded his father in the County of the Principality of Salerno. Unlike Muro, Pescopagano, Bella, and San Fele, Castelgrande is not mentioned in the Catalogus Baronum (mid-12th century), which, according to Giacomo Racioppi, is consistent with a Norman-era foundation, while according to Angelo Racaniello and Nicola Cianci di Leo Sanseverino, its origins would be earlier and the absence of Castelgrande in the Catalogus would be explained by the fact that it was part of the royal demesne and therefore not subject to any feudal lord.

The first known mention of Castelgrande dates back to the so-called Statutum de riparatione castrorum (1231-1240), in which it is established that the maintenance of the castrum Petre Pagane (Pescopagano) must be provided by: "hominem eiusdem Terre, Tufarie, Castelli de Grandis, Plancani", that is, the same men from Pescopagano, those from Tufaria (San Lorenzo in Tufara), from Castelgrande, from Plancano (Cianciuoli, a place near Laviano).
