= Mottafollone =

- Comune
- Comune di Mottafollone
- Location within Italy Location within Calabria
- Coordinates: 39°39′N 16°4′E
- Country: Italy
- Region: Calabria
- Province: Cosenza (CS)

Government
  - Mayor: Romeo Basile

Area
  - Total: 31.58 km^{2} (12.19 sq mi)
- Elevation: 384 m (1,260 ft)

Population (30 November 2017)
  - Total: 1,212
  - Density: 38.38/km^{2} (99.40/sq mi)
- Demonym: Mottafollonesi
- Time zone: UTC+1 (CET)
  - Summer (DST): UTC+2 (CEST)
- Postal code: 87010
- Dialing code: 0981
- ISTAT code: 078085
- Website: Official website

Mottafollone (Calabrian: Mattifiddruni) is a town and comune in the province of Cosenza in the Calabria region of southern Italy.
