= Bonifati =

Bonifati Greek: Félla
- Comune
- Comune di Bonifati
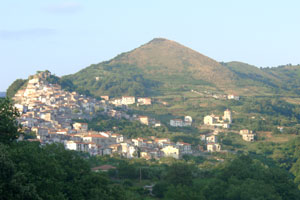
- View of Bonifati

- Location within Italy Location within Calabria
- Coordinates: 39°54′N 15°54′E
- Country: Italy
- Region: Calabria
- Province: Cosenza (CS)
- Frazioni: Cittadella del Capo, Torrevecchia, Sparvasile, Cirimarco, Iardino, Paneduro, Pero, San Candido, San Lorenzo, Telegrafo

Government
  - Mayor: Francesco Grosso

Area
  - Total: 33.85 km^{2} (13.07 sq mi)
- Elevation: 425 m (1,394 ft)

Population (30 November 2018)
  - Total: 2,772
  - Density: 81.89/km^{2} (212.1/sq mi)
- Demonym: Bonifatesi
- Time zone: UTC+1 (CET)
  - Summer (DST): UTC+2 (CEST)
- Postal code: 87020
- Dialing code: 0982
- Patron saint: St. Mary Magdalene
- Saint day: July 22
- Website: Official website

Bonifati (Calabrian: Bunìfati) is a town and comune in the province of Cosenza in the Calabria region of southern Italy.

== Administration ==
Bonifati is, to date, the only Italian comune to have had the same female mayor for three electoral terms.

== Climate ==
Climate data for Bonifati (1991–2020)
Month	Jan	Feb	Mar	Apr	May	Jun	Jul	Aug	Sep	Oct	Nov	Dec	Year
Mean daily maximum °C (°F)	11.1 (52.0)	11.3 (52.3)	14.0 (57.2)	17.0 (62.6)	21.2 (70.2)	25.6 (78.1)	28.3 (82.9)	29.0 (84.2)	25.2 (77.4)	21.0 (69.8)	16.4 (61.5)	12.2 (54.0)	19.4 (66.9)
Daily mean °C (°F)	8.5 (47.3)	8.4 (47.1)	10.7 (51.3)	13.4 (56.1)	17.5 (63.5)	21.6 (70.9)	24.2 (75.6)	24.9 (76.8)	21.4 (70.5)	17.7 (63.9)	13.7 (56.7)	9.7 (49.5)	16.0 (60.8)
Mean daily minimum °C (°F)	6.0 (42.8)	5.6 (42.1)	7.4 (45.3)	9.8 (49.6)	13.7 (56.7)	17.6 (63.7)	20.1 (68.2)	20.8 (69.4)	17.6 (63.7)	14.5 (58.1)	10.9 (51.6)	7.3 (45.1)	12.6 (54.7)
Average precipitation mm (inches)	129.6 (5.10)	102.0 (4.02)	99.7 (3.93)	81.8 (3.22)	62.2 (2.45)	33.4 (1.31)	24.4 (0.96)	30.9 (1.22)	89.6 (3.53)	104.6 (4.12)	152.9 (6.02)	141.3 (5.56)	1,052.3 (41.43)
Average precipitation days (≥ 1 mm)	10.1	10.2	8.3	8.5	6.5	3.7	2.3	2.7	6.8	7.7	10.9	11.1	88.9
Average relative humidity (%)	75.8	74.2	72.5	73.1	73.9	74.4	74.8	74.7	74.3	75.5	76.0	75.6	74.6
Source: NOAA

== People ==
- Alessandro Rosina, Italian former footballer who played as an attacking midfielder or winger.
