= Roccella Ionica =

Coastal Calabrian town famous for jazz festival

- Comune
- Comune di Roccella Ionica
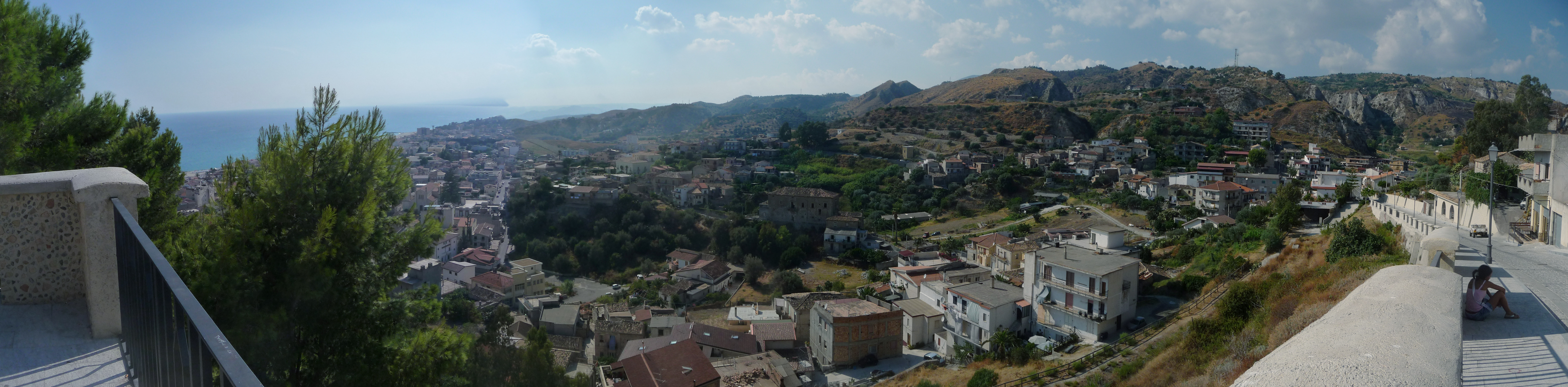
- Panorama of Roccella Ionica

- Coat of arms

- Location within Italy Location within Calabria
- Coordinates: 38°19′N 16°24′E
- Country: Italy
- Region: Calabria
- Metropolitan city: Reggio Calabria (RC)
- Frazioni: Mancino, Spanò Bosco Catalano, Canne, Cutunizza, Ferraro, Serulline.

Government
  - Mayor: Vittorio Zito

Area
  - Total: 37 km^{2} (14 sq mi)
- Elevation: 16 m (52 ft)

Population (December 2007)
  - Total: 6,768
  - Density: 180/km^{2} (470/sq mi)
- Demonym: Roccellesi (Ruccejoti in the local dialect)
- Time zone: UTC+1 (CET)
  - Summer (DST): UTC+2 (CEST)
- Postal code: 89047
- Dialing code: 0964
- Patron saint: Saint Victor
- Saint day: 21 July
- Website: Official website

Roccella Ionica (Italian pronunciation: [rotˈtʃɛlla ˈjɔːnika]; also known as Roccella Jonica or simply as Roccella (Roccellese: Rucceja) is a town and comune located on the Ionian Sea in Calabria, southern Italy.

Possibly built on the site of the ancient Greek settlement of Amphissa, Roccella is probably best known for hosting a major annual jazz festival. It is a town on the sea and has many tourists in summer for beach vacations.

== Twin towns ==
- (Italy) Arco

== Sources ==
- Elio Walter Barillaro, Roccella Jonica e Maria SS. Delle Grazie nel 450 Anniversario del Miracolo (1545-1995) (1995)
