= Guardia Perticara =

- Comune
- Comune di Guardia Perticara
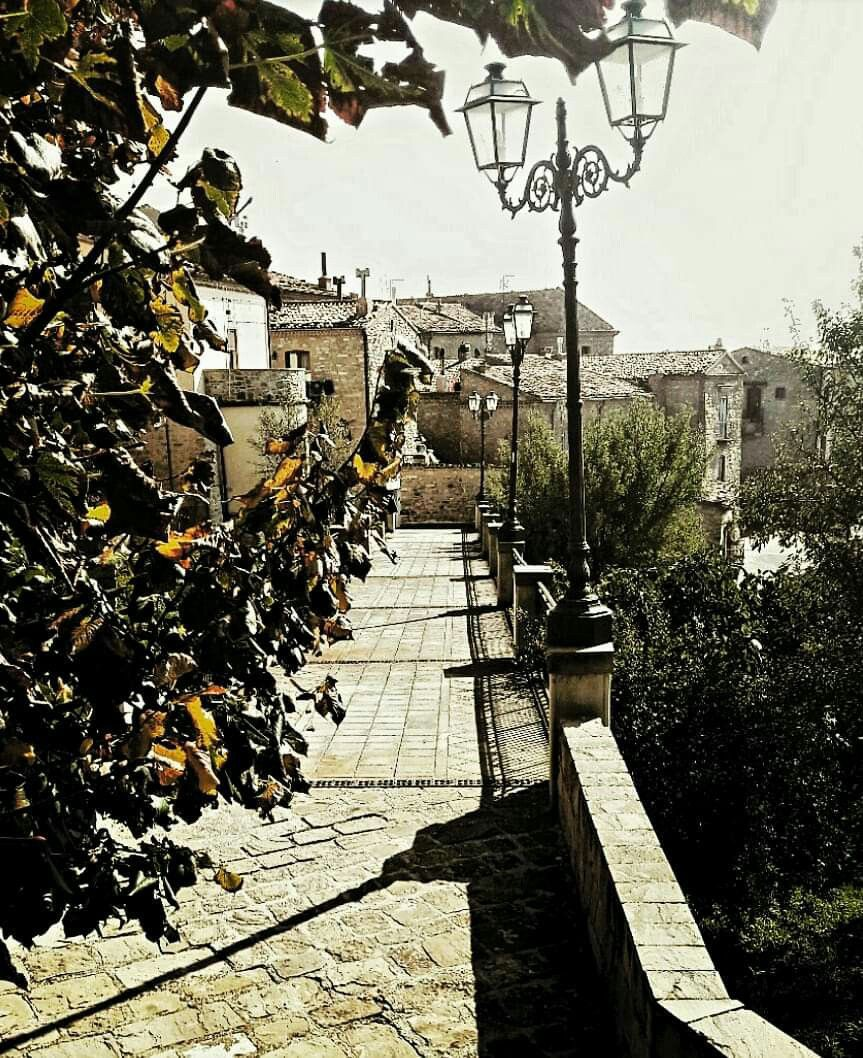
- View of Guardia Perticara

- Coat of arms

- Location within Italy Location within Basilicata
- Coordinates: 40°21′36.30″N 16°5′57.19″E
- Country: Italy
- Region: Basilicata
- Province: Potenza (PZ)

Government
  - Mayor: Pasquale Montano

Area
  - Total: 53.68 km^{2} (20.73 sq mi)
- Elevation: 750 m (2,460 ft)

Population (31 December 2009)
  - Total: 643
  - Density: 12.0/km^{2} (31.0/sq mi)
- Demonym: Guardiesi
- Time zone: UTC+1 (CET)
  - Summer (DST): UTC+2 (CEST)
- Postal code: 85010
- Dialing code: 0971
- ISTAT code: 076038
- Website: Official website

Guardia Perticara is a town and comune in the province of Potenza, in the Southern Italian region of Basilicata. It has 519 people. It is one of I Borghi più belli d'Italia ("The most beautiful villages of Italy").
