= San Sosti =

- Comune
- Comune di San Sosti
- Location within Italy Location within Calabria
- Coordinates: 39°39′36″N 16°1′42″E
- Country: Italy
- Region: Calabria
- Province: Cosenza (CS)
- Frazioni: Macellara, Fravitta

Government
  - Mayor: Vincenzo De Marco

Area
  - Total: 43.55 km^{2} (16.81 sq mi)
- Elevation: 355 m (1,165 ft)

Population (2011)
  - Total: 2,126
  - Density: 48.82/km^{2} (126.4/sq mi)
- Demonym: Sansostesi
- Time zone: UTC+1 (CET)
  - Summer (DST): UTC+2 (CEST)
- Postal code: 87010
- Dialing code: 0981
- Patron saint: Saint Joseph
- Saint day: March 19
- Website: Official website

San Sosti (Calabrian: Santisuòsti; from Greek: Άγιος Σώστης, romanized: Agios Sostis) is a comune in the province of Cosenza, in Calabria, southern Italy.

== History ==
A highly decorated bronze axe-head was discovered near San Sosti in 1846. This votive offering was later bought by the collector and goldsmith Alessandro Castellani, from whom it was eventually acquired by the British Museum in 1884. On the axe is inscribed an important dedication in the Achaean dialect of Ancient Greek that can be dated to the sixth century BC.

In 1448, people from Albania migrated to San Sosti.

== Main sights ==
- Sanctuary of Madonna del Pettoruto, founded in 1274 by the monks of the Abbey of Acquaformosa. It was rebuilt after the 1783 Calabrian earthquakes. It houses a 17th-century stone sculpture of a Madonna with Child
- The Abbey of San Sozonte (10th-11th centuries)
- The ruins of the Rocca, a 10th-century castle, which according to tradition was used by Hannibal during the Punic Wars.
