= Rapone =

- Comune
- Comune di Rapone
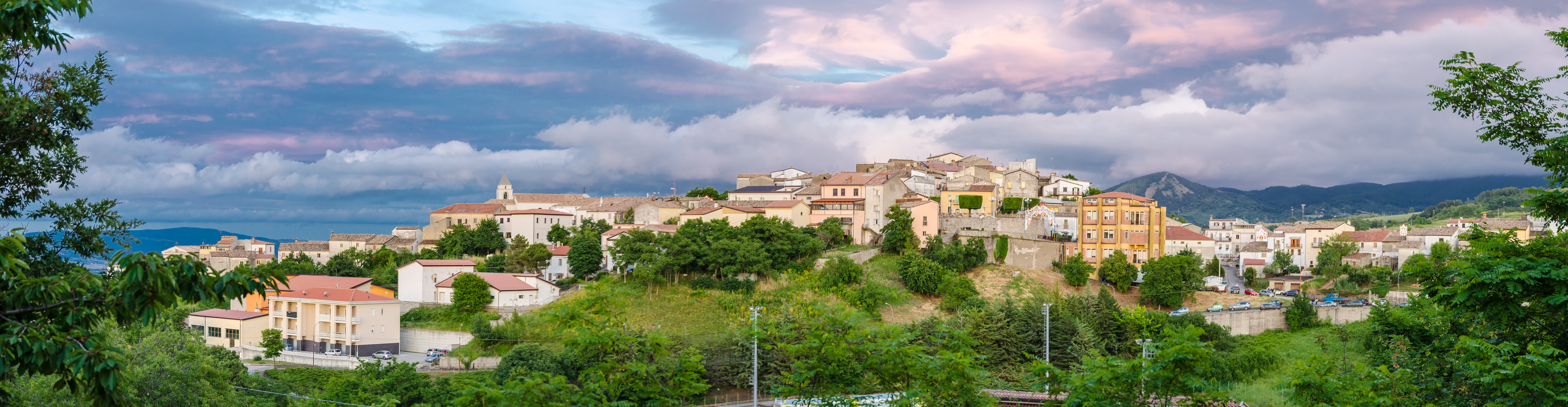
- View of Rapone

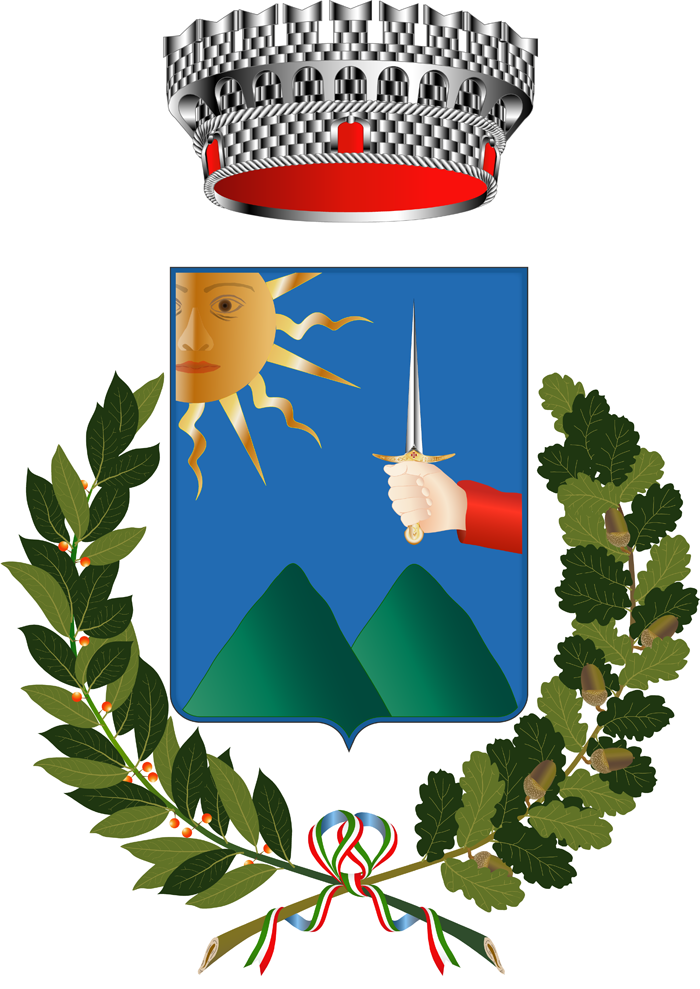
- Coat of arms

- Location within Italy Location within Basilicata
- Coordinates: 40°51′N 15°30′E
- Country: Italy
- Region: Basilicata
- Province: Potenza (PZ)

Government
  - Mayor: Patrizia Gamma (La Margherita) elected 2004-06-13

Area
  - Total: 29.14 km^{2} (11.25 sq mi)
- Elevation: 838 m (2,749 ft)

Population (2001)
  - Total: 1,203
  - Density: 41.28/km^{2} (106.9/sq mi)
- Demonym: Raponesi
- Time zone: UTC+1 (CET)
  - Summer (DST): UTC+2 (CEST)
- Postal code: 85020
- Dialing code: 0976
- ISTAT code: 076065
- Patron saint: Saint Vitus
- Saint day: 15 June
- Website: Official website

Rapone is a town and comune in the province of Potenza, in the region of Basilicata. It is bounded by the comuni of Calitri (AV), Castelgrande, Pescopagano, Ruvo del Monte, San Fele.
