= Palazzo delle Arti di Napoli =

Palazzo delle Arti Napoli
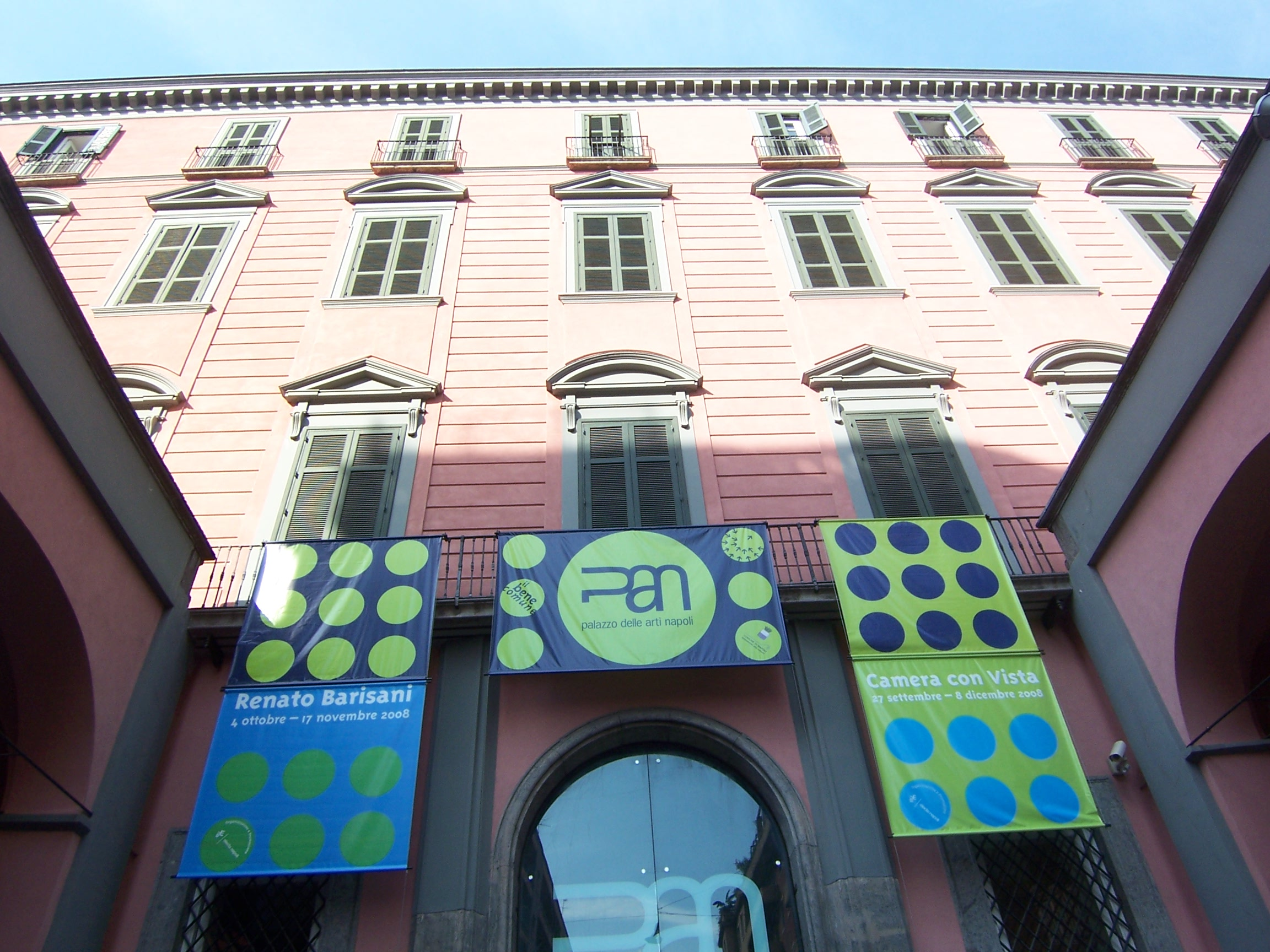
- Museum of Palazzo delle Arti
- Established: March 26, 2005
- Location: Via dei Mille, 60, 80121 Naples
- Coordinates: 40°50′13″N 14°14′13″E
- Type: Contemporary Museum
- Architect: Luca Vecchione

The Palazzo delle Arti di Napoli (simply known by the acronym PAN) is a museum in the city of Naples, located in the historic Carafa di Roccella - a monumental building located in the neighbourhood of Chiaia, via dei Mille; it hosts exhibitions of contemporary art in its many forms (painting, sculpture, photography, graphics, comics, design, video art, cinema).

== History ==
The Municipality of Naples purchased the building and began its restoration in 1984; in 1998 it established its intended use as a documentation center for contemporary arts, subsequently extended also to the exhibition activity. It was inaugurated on March 26, 2005. The structure has an area of 6,000 m2 on three floors with exhibition areas, media library, spaces for educational activities, dedicated library, cafes, terraces.
