= Laviano =

- Comune
- Comune di Laviano
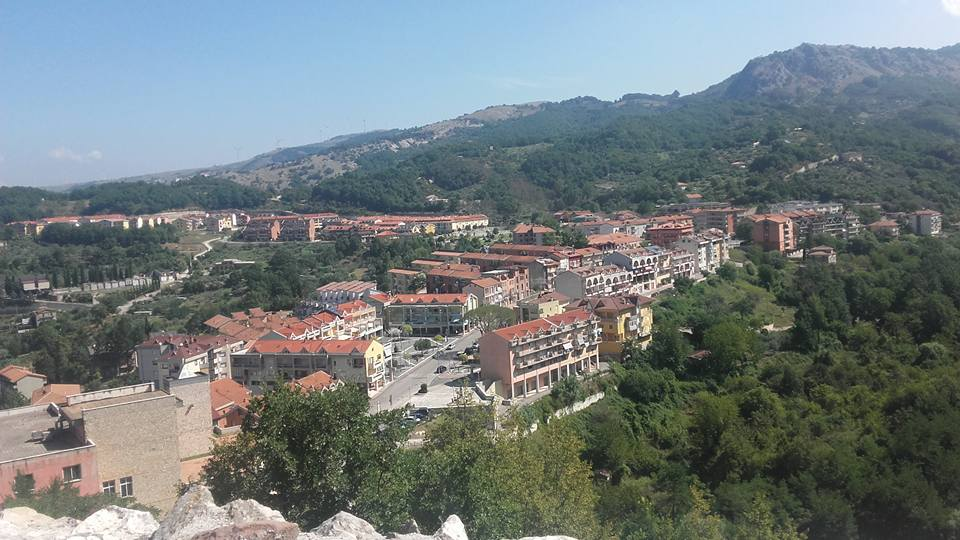

- Location within Italy Location within Campania
- Coordinates: 40°47′N 15°18′E
- Country: Italy
- Region: Campania
- Province: Salerno (SA)

Government
  - Mayor: Oscar Imbriaco

Area
  - Total: 56 km^{2} (22 sq mi)

Population (31 August 2017)
  - Total: 1,380
  - Density: 25/km^{2} (64/sq mi)
- Demonym: Lavianesi
- Time zone: UTC+1 (CET)
  - Summer (DST): UTC+2 (CEST)
- Postal code: 84020
- Dialing code: 0828
- Patron saint: San Pasquale Baylon
- Saint day: May 17
- Website: Official website

Laviano is a town and comune in the province of Salerno in the Campania region of south-western Italy. The commune has a population of 1,409.
