= Bengali name =

Naming conventions in Bengali culture

Personal names in Bengali-speaking countries typically consist of one or several given names and a surname. While the given name is usually gender-specific, the citation of the name generally follows the "Western order" of "given name, surname". This practice, however, is not strictly universal. Personal names generally depend on the person's religion and draw origins from languages such as Sanskrit, Pali, Arabic, and Persian, though they are used and pronounced according to native Bengali norms.

== First names ==
Many people in Bangladesh and West Bengal possess two given names: a "good name" (Bengali: ভালো নাম, romanized: bhalo nam), which is used on all legal documents, and a "call name" or "nickname" (Bengali: ডাক নাম, romanized: dak nam), used by family members and close friends.

The two names may not be etymologically related. For example, a man named "Shumon", "Sumon", or "Suman" (Bengali: সুমন) may be called by his dak nam (e.g., Bengali: বুবাই, romanized: Bubai) at home and by his bhalo nam (Bengali: সুমন, romanized: Shumon) in formal settings.

It is also common to have a shortened version of the bhalo nam. For instance, Dipu (Bengali: দিপু) may be used for Dipok (Bengali: দীপক), and Faru (Bengali: ফারু) for Farhana (Bengali: ফারহানা).

In some cases, the "first name" serves as a component of a compound name. For example, in the name "Abd al-Rahman" (pronounced Abd-ur-Rahman), "Abdur" may be cited as the "first name" and "Rahman" as the "last name" in legal documents, despite the theological requirement for the phrase to remain intact.

== Middle names ==
While middle names are common in Bangladesh and West Bengal, they are not universal. A modern trend involves adding the dak nam to the middle or end of the full official name. This can result in names such as "Saifuddin Kanchon Choudhuri" (সাইফুদ্দীন কাঞ্চন চৌধুরী), where "Saifuddin" is the bhalo nam, "Kanchon" is the dak nam, and "Choudhuri" is the family name. Depending on personal preference, the individual may style it as "Saifuddin Choudhuri Kanchon".

== Family names ==
Bengali surnames reflect the region's diverse religious and cultural history.

Bengali Hindu families typically use names of Sanskrit origin, followed by Farsi and Bengali. Some surnames, such as Chatterjee (from Chattopadhyay), were shortened or anglicized during the British colonial period.

Bengali Muslim families often employ names of Arabic origin, followed by Farsi and Bengali. Among Muslims of Bangladesh, naming conventions vary, and there is no strictly fixed scheme for the structure of names, historically differing from the rigid surname structures found in the West.

Certain family names are found across religious boundaries, such as চৌধুরী (Choudhuri/Chowdhury), সরকার (Sorkar/Sarker/Sarkar), and বিশ্বাস (Bishwas).

=== Common family names by religion ===
==== Bengali Hindu family names and titles ====
Name (Bangla)	Romanisation	Common transliteration
ভট্টাচার্য্য (or ভট্টাচার্য)	B́oŧŧacar̀j̄o	Bhattacharya (Bhottacharjo)
বন্দ্যোপাধ্যায় (or ব্যানার্জী)	Bondḑópad́ḑ́aj	Banerjee (Bondopaddhay)
বসু	Bošu	Bose (Boshu)
ভৌমিক	B́óúmik	Bhowmick (Bhoumik)
বিশ্বাস	Biśṣ́aš	Biswas (Bishshash)
চক্রবর্তী	Cokrobor̀ty	Chakraborty (Chokroborty)
চট্টপাধ্যায় (or চ্যাটার্জী)	Cæŧar̀ɉy	Chatterjee (Chottopaddhay)
চৌধুরী	Cóúd́ury	Chowdhury (Choudhuri)
দাস	Daš	Das (Dash)
দাশগুপ্ত	Dásgûpto	Dasgupta (Dashgupto)
দে	De	Dey (De)
দেব	Deb / Dev	Deb (Deba)
দেবনাথ	Débnát	Debnath (Debnath)
দত্ত	Dotto	Dutt (Dotto/Dutta)
দত্তগুপ্ত	Dottogûpto	Duttagupta (Dottogupto)
গঙ্গোপাধ্যায় (or গাঙ্গুলী)	Gaɲguly	Ganguly (Gonggopaddhay)
গায়েন	Gajen	Gain (Ga'en)
ঘোষ	Ǵós̊	Ghosh
ঘোষাল	Góṣ̌al	Ghoshal (Ghoshal)
গোস্বামী	Góṣ̌amy	Goswami (Goshami)
গুহ	Guho	Guha (Guho)
গুপ্ত	Gupto	Gupta (Gupto)
লাহিড়ি	Láhîri	Lahiri (Lahiri)
মজুমদার	Mozumdar	Mazumdar/Majumder (Mojumdar)
মিত্র	Mitro	Mitra (Mitro)
মুখোপাধ্যায় (or মুখার্জী)	Muḱar̀ɉy	Mukherjee (Mukhopaddhay)
নাথ	Nat́	Nath
নাহার	Nahār	Nahar
নস্কর	Noškor	Naskar (Noshkor)
পাল	Pal	Paul/Pal (Pal)
প্রভুপাদ	Prob́upado	Prabhupada (Probhupado)
পুরকায়স্থ	Purkajost́o	Purkait (Puroka'ostho)
রায়	Raj	Roy/Ray (Ra'i)
সাহা	Šaha	Saha (Shaha)
সান্যাল	Sanjal	Sanyal (Sannal)
সরকার	Šorkar	Sarker/Sarkar (Shorkar)
সেন	Šen	Sen (Shen)
সেনগুপ্ত	Séngûpto	Sengupta (Shengupto)
সিংহ	Šiṅġho	Singha
সিংহ রায়	Šiṅġho Ray	Singha Roy/Sinha Roy (Singho Ray)
ঠাকুর	Ŧ́akur	Tagore (Thakur)
চন্দ	Condo	Chanda (Chondo)
বাগচী	Bagcy	Bagchi
লস্কর	Loškor	Laskar (Loshkor)
ধর	Dhor	Dhar ( Dhor)
সরকার	Shorkar	Sarkar
মৈত্র	Maitra	Maitra (Moitra)
কর	Kor	Kar (Kor)
ভাদুড়ী	Bhadury	Bhadury (Bhadury)
পাল চৌধুরী	Pal Cóúdúry	Pal Chowdhury (Pal Choudhury)
মাইতি	Máity	Maity (Maity)
ভট্টশালী	Bháttåsháli	Bhattashali (Bhattashali)
চট্টরাজ	Cóttóráj	Chattaraj (Chottoraj)
কানুনগো	Kánûngo	Kanungo (Kanungo)
দত্ত মজুমদার	Dottomazumdar	Dattamajumder (Dattamajumder)
বণিক	Boꞥik	Bonik (Bonik)
ব্যাপারী	Bæpary	Bapary (Baepari)

==== Bengali Muslim family names and titles ====
Name (Bangla)	Romanisation	Common transliteration
আকন্দ	Akanda	Akhund, Akan, Akhanda
ভূঁইয়া	Bhųiya	Bhuiyan
চাকলাদার	Cakladar	Chakladar
চৌধুরী	Cóúdhuree	Chowdhury
দেওয়ান	Dewan	Dewan
ডিহিদার	Đihidar	Dihidar
ফকির	Fokir	Fakir
গাজী (or গাজি)	Gazi	Gazi
গোমস্তা	Gómosta	Gomastha
হালদার	Haldar	Haldar
হাওলাদার	Haoladar	Howlader
হাজারী	Hazaree	Hazari
ইনামদার	Inamdar	Inamdar
জোয়ার্দার	Jówardar/Jówaddar	Joardar
কানুনগো	Kanungó	Kanungo
কারকুন	Karkun	Karkun
কাজী (or কাজি)	Kazi	Kazi
খাঁ (or খান)	Khą/Khan	Khan
খান পন্নী	Khan Ponni	Khan Panni
খান লোহানী (or লোহানি)	Khan Lóhani	Khan Lohani
খান মুঘুল	Khan Mughul	Khan Mughal
খন্দকার	Khondokar	Khandakar
কোরেশী	Koreshee	Quraishi
মজুমদার	Mozumdar	Majumdar
মল্লিক	Mollik	Mallik
মণ্ডল	Monđol	Mandal
মাতুব্বর	Matubbor	Matubbar
মিয়া/ মিঞা	Miya	Miah
মীর	Meer	Mir
মীর্জা (or মির্জা)	Mirza	Mirza
মোল্লা	Molla	Molla
মলঙ্গী	Molongee	Malangi
মল্ল	Mollo	Malla
মৃধা	Mridha	Mridha
মুহুরী	Muhuree	Muhuri
মুন্সী (or মুন্সি)	Munshi	Munshi
মুস্তাফী (or মুস্তাফি)	Mustafi	Mustafi
পাটোয়ারী	Paŧowaree	Patwari
প্রামাণিক	Pramaꞥik	Pramanik
প্রধান	Prodhan	Prodhan
সাদিয়া	Sadiya	Sadia
সরকার	Shorkar	Sarkar
সরদার	Shordar	Sardar
সৈয়দ	Sóíyod	Syed
শাহ	Shah	Shah
শেখ	Shekh	Sheikh
শিকদার	Shikdar	Sikdar
তালুকদার	Talukdar	Taluqdar
বিশ্বাস	Bish'ash	Biswas

=== Bengali Buddhist surnames ===
- Barua/Borua

=== Bengali Christian surnames ===
Many Bengali Christians use English and Portuguese surnames along with traditional surnames. Most Catholic Bengali Christians have Portuguese surnames, such as: Gomes, Rozario, D'Costa, Gonsalvez, Cruze, Dias, D'Silva, and D'Souza.

== Initials and prefixes ==
Muhammad (মোহাম্মদ), also spelled Mohammed, Muhammed, Mohamed, Mohammad, or Muhammod, is a common prefix used before the name of many Muslim males. It is often not considered the name used to refer to the person. In many cases, the "Muhammad" prefix is shortened to মোঃ ("Md." or "MD."). Other common prefixes are not systematic. The prefix often serves as the first name, while the given name appears as the middle name or last name.

== Further read ==
- Dutta, Bhabataran (1981). A Linguistic Study of Personal Names and Surnames in Bengali. India: University of Calcutta.
