= Brahmbhatt =

Brahmbhatt is a Brahmin sub category primarily residing in Gujarat, Rajasthan and Uttar Pradesh. Few populations also reside in Sindh, Punjab, Kashmir, Bengal. The Community also has a big number of Diaspora in the Western world, Africa and Arab world. Notable people with this surname include:

- Akshay Brahmbhatt (born 1996), Indian cricketer
- Aniruddh Brahmabhatt, (1937–1981), Indian language poet and writer
- Bali Brahmbhatt (fl. 1993–2012), Bollywood playback singer and rapper
- Harsh Brahmbhatt (born 1954), Indian language poet and writer
- Maheshdas Brahmbhatt alias Birbal (1528–1586), Poet, minister and commander of the Mughal Empire.
- Prakash Brahmbhatt (born 1951), Indian politician
- Radha Brahmbhatt (fl. 2008), Indian delegate to Miss International 2008
- Raghunath Brahmbhatt (1892–1983), Indian writer

The Brahmbhatts possess honorific titles such as Barot (title), Inamdar(title), Rai, Jagirdar(title), Rao, Dashondhi because of their historical ties with Indian royals.

== See also ==
- Brahmbhatt, the surname Bhat, associated with the Indian Brahmin caste
- Rao
- Barot
- Inamdar
