= Lenzi =

Lenzi may refer to:

- Lenzi, Talesh, village in Chubar Rural District, Haviq District, Talesh County, Gilan Province, Iran
- Lenzi (surname), surname

== See also ==
- Lenzie, a town in Scotland
- Lanzi, a surname
