= Francesco Bassi =

Italian painter

- Born: 1642; Cremona
- Died: 1732 (aged 89–90); Venice
- Other names: Francesco Maria Bassi the elder, "the Cremonese of the villages"
- Occupation: painter
- Known for: landscapes
- Relatives: F. M. Bassi, the Younger (cousin)

Francesco Bassi (early 1642–1732) was an Italian painter active in the early Baroque period, mainly in his hometown of Cremona, but also in Venice. He was also known as Francesco Maria Bassi the elder.

== Biography and Work ==
He was born in Cremona in 1642, and is remembered by Lanzi for his landscapes "of a taste, varied, pleasant, finished, full of stain and warm atmosphere: often to countryside he added men and animals that were represented very well". Emigrated from his hometown to Venice, where he was married. He was called "the Cremonese of the villages"(Cremonese dai Paesi) for his skill in painting landscapes. Zaist praised him for the "great happiness of inventions", but his production is scarcely documented today. Two large landscapes with figures and animals are attributed to him in the Pinacoteca of Cremona, based on the comparison with a signed design, already belonging to the Ala Ponzone family. These are landscapes of still Bolognese origin with general notions of Travi and Grechetto, but of theatrically decorative spirit. According to Zaist, he had a copious production of which we no longer have any trace.

Bryan attributes his training to either Lorenzo Pasinelli, Cesare Gennari, or Guercino at Bologna.

He died in Venice in the early years of the 18th century. He should be distinguished from another F. M. Bassi, the Younger, who was his cousin, also a painter, living in the second half of the eighteenth century.
