= Bhowmick =

Origin
- Origin: Bengali Hindu
- Region of origin: Bengal

Bhowmick (Bengali: ভৌমিক), also spelled Bhowmik or Bhaumik, is a native Bengali surname, commonly found among the Bengali Hindus of Bangladesh and Indian states of West Bengal, Assam and Tripura. The surname is found among various castes including Bengali Kayastha and Mahishya of West Bengal and Bangladesh.

== Notables ==
- Anil K. Bhowmick (born 1954), University of Houston professor known for contributions to rubber technology
- Anjana Bhowmick, Bengali film actress
- Aryann Bhowmik (born 1992), Bengali film actor
- Asim Bhaumik, Indian chemist
- Lalkamal Bhowmick (born 1987), Indian footballer
- Mainak Bhaumik, Bengali film director
- Mani Lal Bhaumik (born 1931), Indian-born American physicist and author
- Moushumi Bhowmik (born 1964), Indian Bengali singer and songwriter
- Partha Bhowmick (born 1964), Indian politician
- Sachin Bhowmick (1930–2011), Indian Hindi film writer and director
- Subhash Bhowmick (1950–2022), Indian footballer
