= Ranzi =

Ranzi may refer to:

- Ranzi (surname)
- Ranzi is a small old town close to Pietra Ligure in the north of Italy.
- Ranzi is also a town in the Niari Region in the Republic of Congo.
- The Arabic name for Tokimeki Tonight series
