= Francesco Gialdisi =

Italian painter

Francesco Gialdisi (circa 1650-after 1720) was an Italian painter, born in Parma but active mainly in Cremona. There is little biographical information available.

He is almost certainly the same as the Gialdisi or Gianlisi (Parma 1650 – Cremona 1720), as cited in Notizie istoriche de’ pittori, scultori e architetti cremonesi (1774) by Giovanni Battista Zaist, who was a painter mostly known by still lifes of flowers and sometimes musical instruments. Other sources mention Antonio Gianlisi (Parma 1671 – Cremona 1727). His works may resemble those of Evaristo Baschenis.
