= Quaglietta =

- Frazione
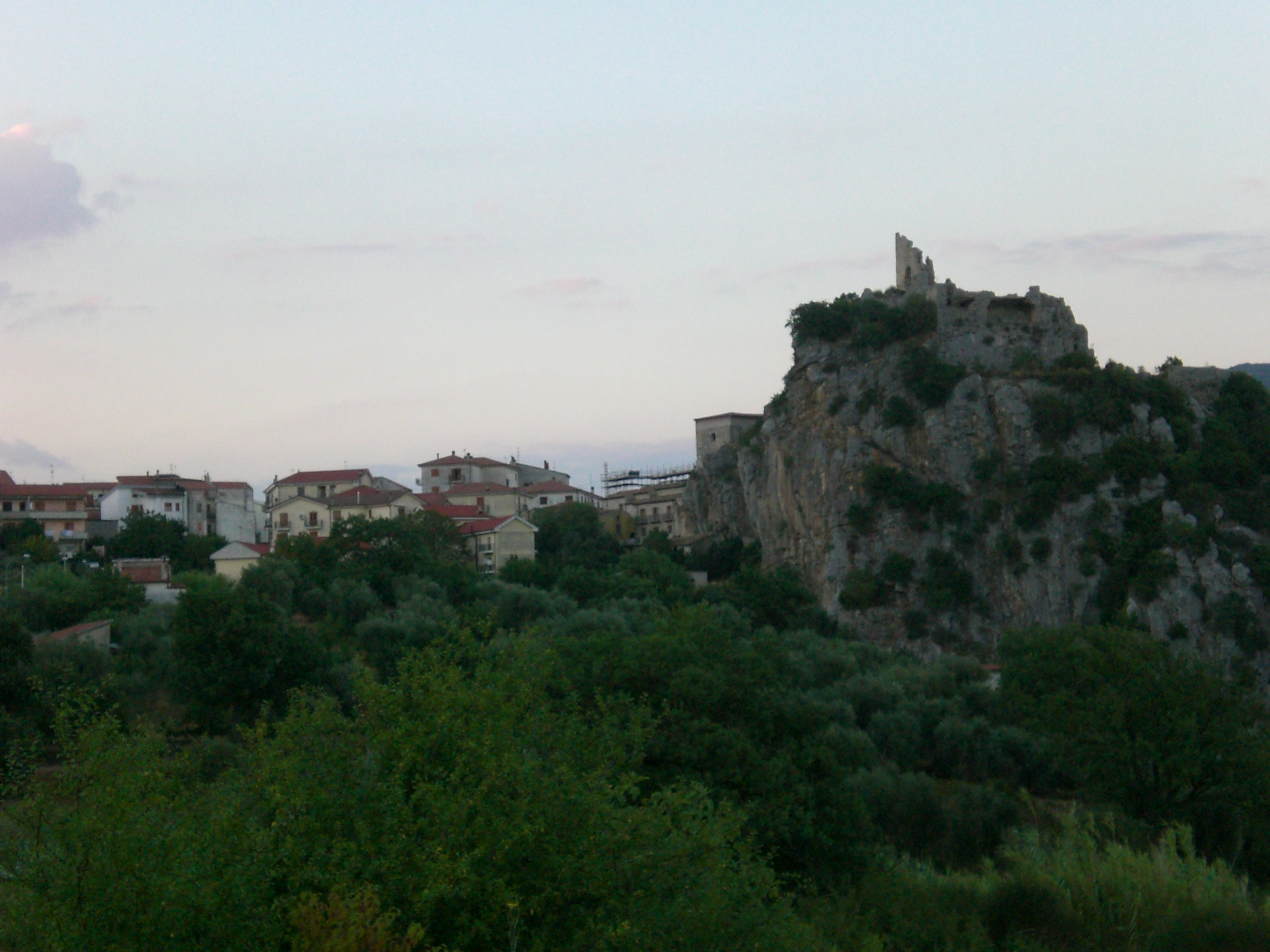
- The Rock of Quaglietta

- Location of Quaglietta in Italy
- Coordinates: 40°44′43″N 15°14′8″E
- Country: Italy
- Region: Campania
- Province: Avellino (AV)
- Comune: Calabritto
- Elevation: 260 m (850 ft)

Population (2011)
  - Total: 443
- Demonym: Quagliettani
- Time zone: UTC+1 (CET)
  - Summer (DST): UTC+2 (CEST)
- Postal code: 83040
- Dialing code: 0827
- Website: Official website

Quaglietta is an Italian hamlet (frazione) situated in the municipality of Calabritto, Province of Avellino, Campania. As of 2011 its population was of 443.

== History ==
The origin of the town's name, meaning "little quail" in Italian, is debated. A different historical hypothesis talks about the transformation of the Latin name Acquae Electae (meaning Selected Water). Autonomous municipality until 1928, it merged into the one of Calabritto as hamlet. It was seriously damaged by the 1980 Irpinia earthquake, along with the other surrounding areas.

== Geography ==
Quaglietta is located close to the Picentini mountain range and in front of the Sele river, which in that side divides the provinces of Salerno and Avellino. It is 5 km far from Senerchia, 7 from Calabritto, 15 (due to a not direct road) from Valva and only 1 from the exit "Senerchia-Quaglietta" of the rapid highway SS691 Lioni-Contursi. 5 little exclaves of Senerchia are situated in the neighborhoods of Quaglietta.

== Main sights ==
Main sights of the village are the "Rock of Quaglietta" and the old town, damaged on 1980 earthquake and partially restored. Another interesting place is the church of Saint Roch.
