= Valva, Campania =

Valva
- Comune
- Comune di Valva
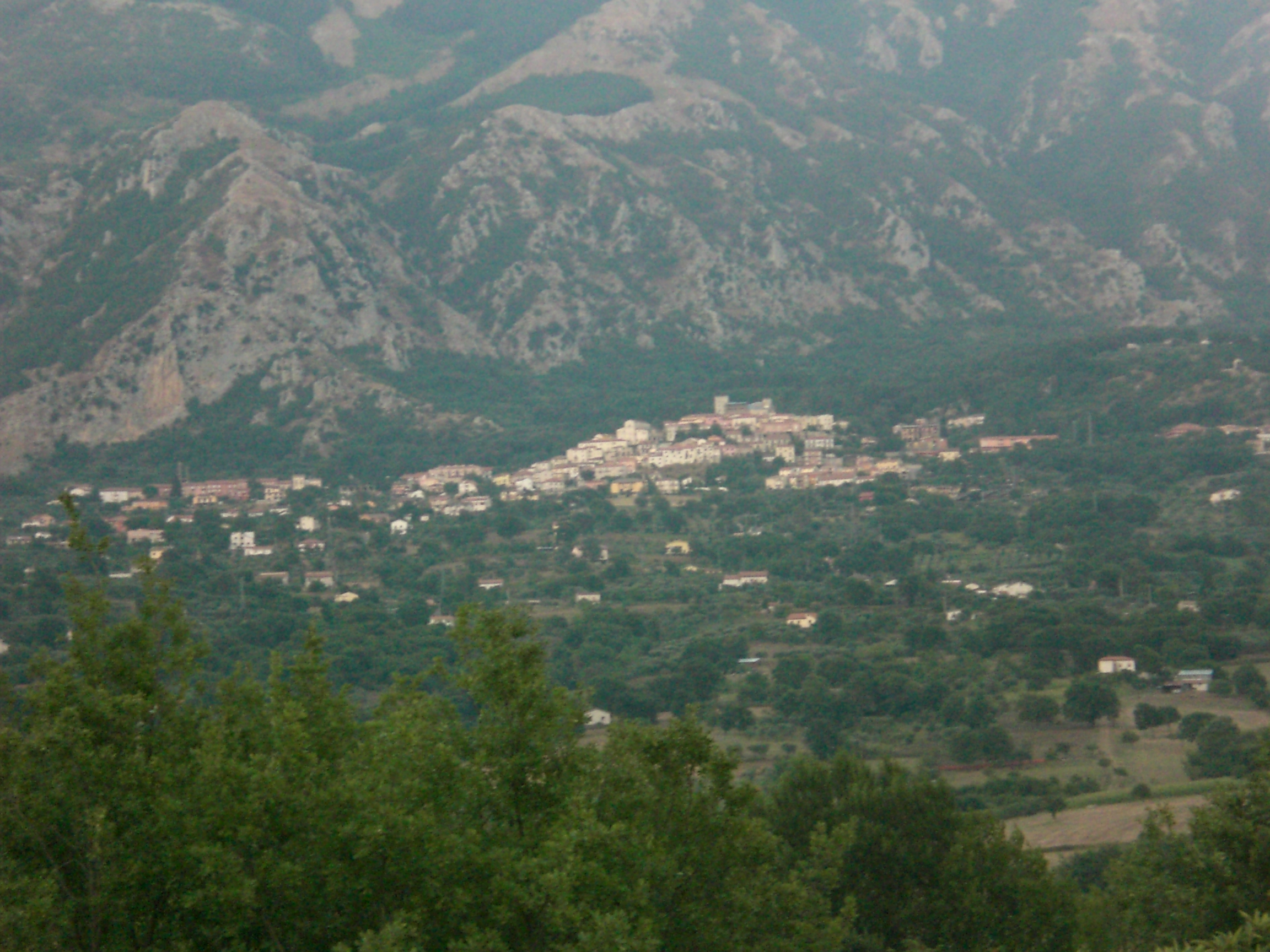
- Panoramic view

- Location within Italy Location within Campania
- Coordinates: 40°44′N 15°16′E
- Country: Italy
- Region: Campania
- Province: Salerno (SA)

Government
  - Mayor: Vito Falcone

Area
  - Total: 26.79 km^{2} (10.34 sq mi)
- Elevation: 510 m (1,670 ft)

Population (31 December 2010)
  - Total: 1,760
  - Density: 65.7/km^{2} (170/sq mi)
- Demonym: Valvesi
- Time zone: UTC+1 (CET)
  - Summer (DST): UTC+2 (CEST)
- Postal code: 84020
- Dialing code: 0828
- Patron saint: St. Michael Arcangel
- Saint day: 8 May and 29 September
- Website: Official website

Valva is an Italian town and municipality in the Province of Salerno in the south-western region of Campania.

== Geography ==
It borders with the communes of Calabritto (AV), Caposele (AV), Colliano, Laviano, Oliveto Citra and Senerchia (AV).

It is an agricultural centre of the upper Sele valley, located on its left side and at the feet of the steep and rugged slopes of Monte delle Rose (1372 m) and Monte Marzano (1524 m).

== History ==
A flourishing town of the same name was present nearby at the time of the Roman Empire. During Barbarian invasions the inhabitants built a new settlement, higher up the mountain; the ruins of this town, Valva Vecchia, can still be seen. Later the population returned to the valley and constructed the town in the current location. During the Norman period it was called Balba, and was a possession of local lords.

== Main sights ==
Sights include the church of San Giacomo, whose façade has three ornate portals in the late-Baroque style.

== Economy ==
The local economy is primarily based on agriculture. Cereals, fodder, olives and vegetables are grown and cattle, pigs and sheep are raised. Forestry and trade in livestock are practised. There is some small-scale production of olive oil, and various types of artisanal activity.

== See also ==
- Quaglietta
- Sele river
- Natural Reserve of Marzano-Eremita Mountains
