= Barot =

Barot may refer to:

- Baraolt, Covasna County, Romania, known as Barót in Hungarian
- Barot (caste), a caste
- Barot (Himachal Pradesh), a picnic spot and tourist location in India
- Barot (Uttar Pradesh), a tehsil in the state of Uttar Pradesh, India

== People ==
- Barot (surname)

== See also ==
- Borat
