= Senerchia =

- Comune
- Comune di Senerchia
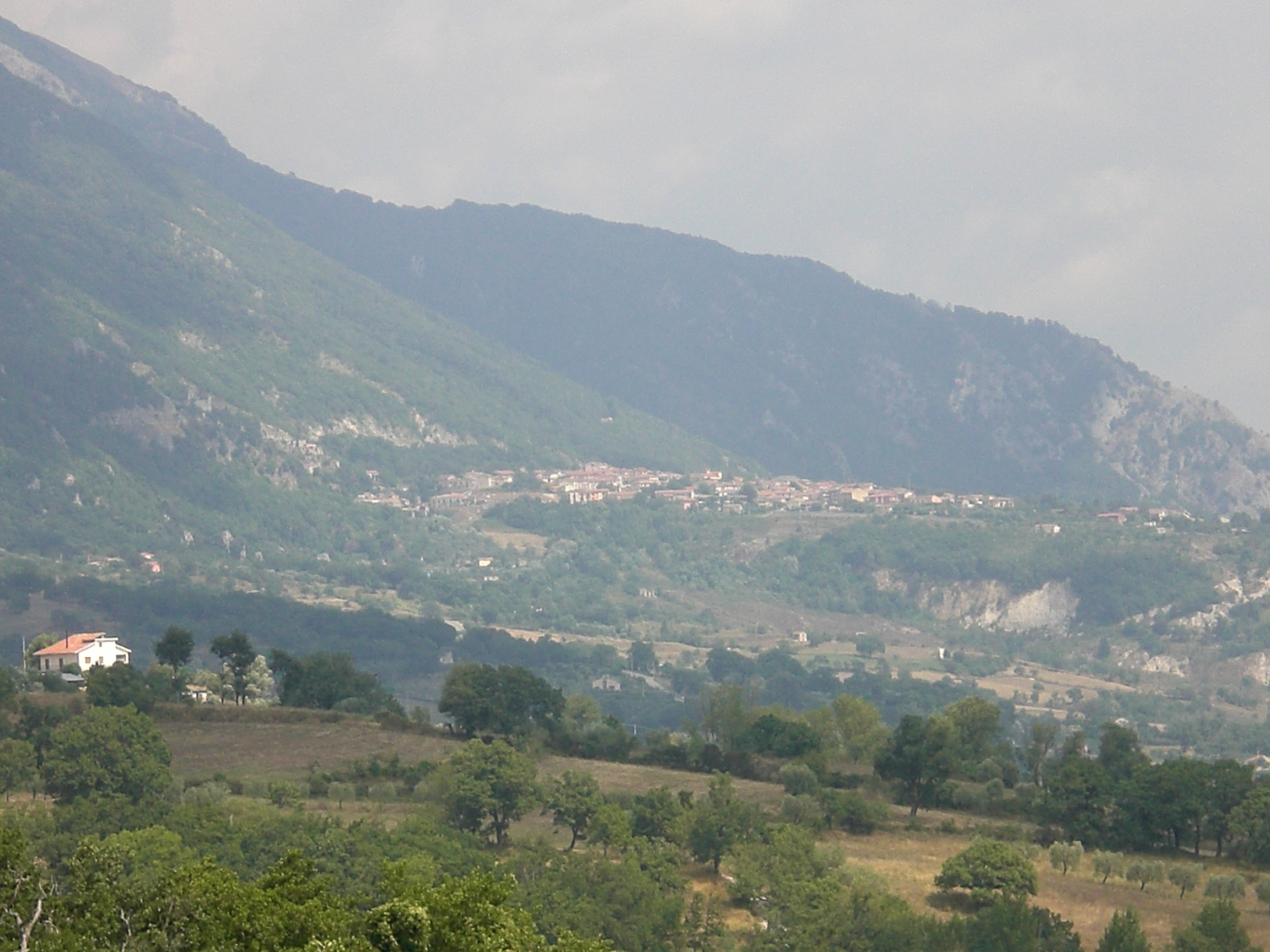

- Location within Italy Location within Campania
- Coordinates: 40°44′30″N 15°12′15″E
- Country: Italy
- Region: Campania
- Province: Province of Avellino
- Frazioni: Saperoni, Acquabianca, Cervaro, Maglio

Government
  - Mayor: Beniamino Grillo (Unione di Centro, UDC)

Area
  - Total: 36 km^{2} (14 sq mi)
- Elevation: 600 m (2,000 ft)
- Highest elevation: 1,803 m (5,915 ft)
- Lowest elevation: 161 m (528 ft)

Population (2011)
  - Total: 1,036
  - Density: 29/km^{2} (75/sq mi)
- Demonym: Senerchiesi
- Time zone: UTC+1 (CET)
  - Summer (DST): UTC+2 (CEST)
- Postal code: 83050
- Dialing code: 0827
- ISTAT code: 064098
- Patron saint: St. Michael the Archangel
- Saint day: 29 September
- Website: Official website

Senerchia (Sinerchia in the local dialect) is an Italian municipality with 1,370 registered voters, but only 1,036 inhabitants, in the Province of Avellino, located in the upper valley of the Sele River in Campania. It was the site of the defeat of Spartacus and is noted for the ruins of an ancient castle.

== Geography ==
Senerchia mainly borders the Province of Salerno, and it is surrounded by the Picentini Mountains. Its main road links it to the town of Quaglietta.

Senerchia borders the municipalities of Acerno (SA), Campagna (SA), Oliveto Citra (SA), Valva (SA) and Calabritto, the only neighbouring municipality in the Province of Avellino.

The village is located 600 metres (2,000 ft) above sea level in the High Sele Valley, in a hilly area on the eastern side of the Picentini Mountains, at the foot of the steep slopes of Mount Boschetiello. The territory is composed of forests and mountains, including many peaks over 1,500 metres (4,900 ft) above sea level, such as Mount Boschetiello at 1,574 metres (5,164 ft), Mount Croce at 1,533 metres (5,030 ft), Raia della Volpe at 1,631 metres (5,351 ft), Sierro dei Cuoppi at 1,683 metres (5,522 ft), Sierro della Pica at 1,536 metres (5,039 ft) and Raia del Pastore at 1,524 metres (5,000 ft). The hilly terrain starts at 600 metres (2,000 ft) and continues down the country on the right bank of the river Sele. The territory is full of springs and landslide soil. In addition to the Sele, which skirts the municipal area, other waterways include the Vallone Forma, Piceglia, Fiumicello Rovivo, Pozzo San Nicola and Acquabianca.

Following the Irpinia earthquake of 1980, Senerchia has undergone a radical urban transformation. The village was completely destroyed. The old part has been abandoned and dangerous buildings are clearly visible. There is now a green area where the main square and the church were destroyed by a landslide. New buildings have been built beside the old site, with new urbanization and wide streets.

== History ==
=== Origins ===
Senerchia originated as a group of remote, pre-Roman settlements. The first settlement was positioned on the heights where the ruins of the castle currently stand, almost forming a fortified town. The ruins of the castle are located in the upper part of the old village, near the church of the town's patron saint, Saint Michael the Archangel. This hill, a spur of Mount Boschetiello, overlooks the High Sele Valley.

The name "Senerchia" is derived from "Sena Herclae," which means "Bosom of Hercules" in archaic Latin. The etymology of the word and the castle ruins may indicate that Senerchia was once strong and powerful. Some also say that, the name recalls the local Northern Tuscan names silerchia and silerchie which presuppose a "silercula" from the Latin Siler-eris, meaning a plant that grows in places full of water.

=== Spartacus ===
The final battle that saw the defeat and death of Spartacus in 71 BC took place in the present-day territory of Senerchia, on a site on the right bank of the river Sele in an area that includes the border with Oliveto Citra up to Calabritto, near the village of Quaglietta. At the time of the battle this territory was part of Lucania. There have been numerous recent finds of armour and swords dating back to the Roman Empire.

Spartacus and his army of slaves were marching toward Apulia to set sail for Thrace when Crassus, who was at the head of a well-armed Roman army, attacked from behind. Spartacus, partially due to the weariness of his men, wanted to take the battle to the Romans. Spartacus killed his horse, saying that if he won he would have all the horses he wanted, but if he lost he would not be tempted to run away. Spartacus was at the front of the attack, where he died after first killing some Roman soldiers. Some detachments of his army fled and scattered over the surrounding mountains.

=== Sinerchia family ===
The Sinerchia family was mentioned in the Catalogus Baronum of 1150–1168.

Scipione Ammirato (1531–1601) described Senerchia as "a castle in the Principality of Salerno of 160 hearths, which has given its name to the family that has owned it for over three hundred years", referring to the Sinerchia family whose history was so closely linked to the estate. The Sinerchias were an ancient noble family of Norman origin, derived from the Filangieri. They took part in many feuds between Campania, Basilicata, and Apulia, and lived mainly between Senerchia and Naples until the fifteenth century. The Sinerchia, transplanted later to the Basilicata region, were honored with the title of Count in the fifteenth century, and following the 1481 Conspiracy of the Barons assumed the surname of Scardaccione. Orlando Sinerchia Scardaccione, Count of Sant’Andrea, when he moved to Potenza, together with his cousin Amelio, was deprived of his estates as a consequence of the Conspiracy of the Barons.

=== Castle ===
The castle of Senerchia, overlooking the High Sele Valley, had ancient origins. It may already have been the defensive garrison of Irpini, and the Romans probably had to work hard to subdue it; hence the Latin name Sena Herclea (which means Bosom of Hercules). It was strengthened under the control of the Byzantines in the final war against the Goths. The Lombards changed the fortifications and made further extensions. In the Angevin period of Senerchia, Nicholas was keeper in 1271, commissioned by Charles I of Anjou. The keep, with only its west front still well preserved, is one of the few survivors of the ancient fortified complex.

=== Famous People ===
In a BBC 2026 episode of Who Do You Think You Are?, Joe Swash explored his paternal Italian ancestry. The programme traced his great-grandmother Maria Raimo to her parents, Giuseppe and Rosa Raimo, who had emigrated from Italy to Clerkenwell, London. Further records showed that Giuseppe Raimo was born in 1864 in Senerchia, in the province of Avellino, to Donato Raimo and Rosaria Sciaraffa.
