= Calabritto =

- Comune
- Comune di Calabritto
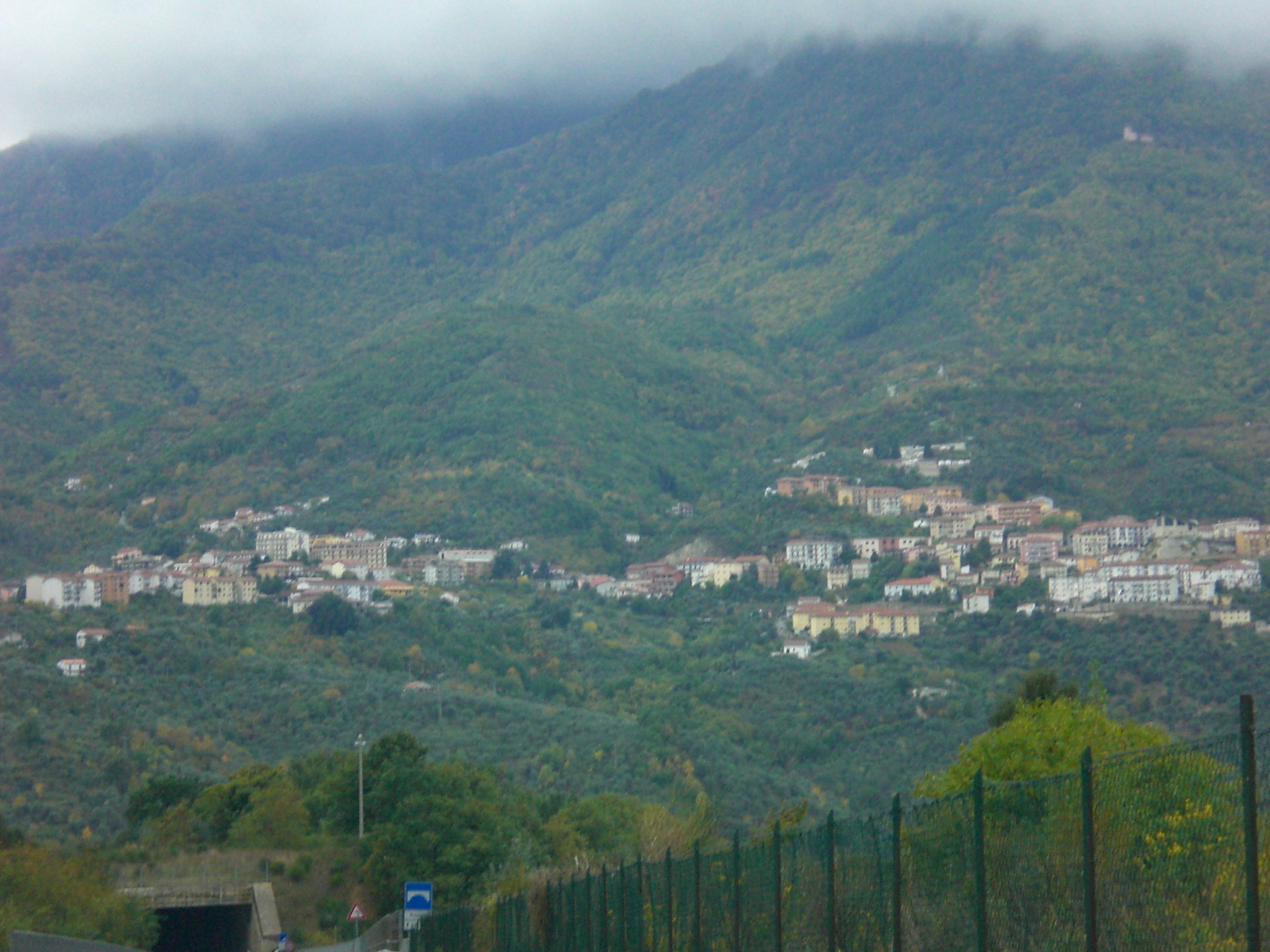
- Panoramic view

- Location within Italy Location within Campania
- Coordinates: 40°47′0″N 15°13′29″E
- Country: Italy
- Region: Campania
- Province: Avellino (AV)
- Frazioni: Quaglietta

Government
  - Mayor: Gelsomino Centanni

Area
  - Total: 56.33 km^{2} (21.75 sq mi)
- Elevation: 480 m (1,570 ft)

Population (30 April 2017)
  - Total: 2,358
  - Density: 41.86/km^{2} (108.4/sq mi)
- Demonym: Calabrittani
- Time zone: UTC+1 (CET)
  - Summer (DST): UTC+2 (CEST)
- Postal code: 83040
- Dialing code: 0827
- Patron saint: Madonna della Neve
- Saint day: 5 August

Calabritto (Irpino: Calavrìttu) is an Italian town and a commune in the province of Avellino, Campania, Italy. It occupies a hilly-mountainous area at the eastern tip of the Monti Picentini range, in the upper Sele valley.

== Geography ==
Calabritto is a small town surrounded by the Picentini mountains in the west and crossed by Sele river in its eastern side, and a stream called the Zagarone. It is linked with a mountain road to the ski resort and village of Laceno. It is considered part of the upper Sele valley. It borders the municipalities of Acerno (SA), Bagnoli Irpino, Caposele, Lioni, Senerchia and Valva (SA). It sits 460 meters above sea level on the slopes of Mount Altillo at the eastern end of the Picentini mountains. There are many springs, some of which feed into the Asis Aqueduct, which provides water for 155 municipalities in the province of Salerno. The only civil parish (frazione) of the municipality is Quaglietta, autonomous municipality merged into Calabritto in 1928. Quaglietta means "little quail."

Calabritto is the municipality in Campania with the largest number of waterfalls. It is surrounded by at least 14, and they are formed by various streams and rivers, including the Ponticchio, Vallone del Lupolo, Vado Carpino, Rivezzuolo, and Zagarone. Calabritto boasts Rivezzuolo, the highest waterfall in the province of Avellino, 80 meters high.

== Culture ==
The town is known for its religious processions, in which residents carry a statue on a litter, walking slowly through the streets. On the last Sunday in July, residents walk halfway up one of the mountains to the church of The Madonna della Neve ("Our Lady of the Snows"), the patron saint of Calabritto. Many of these processions carried over to the United States, when immigrants from Calabritto and other nearby areas brought them to Hammonton, New Jersey and Newark, New Jersey from 1872 through the early 1900s. A photograph of a Calabrittani who is said to be the first Italian inhabitant of Newark, New Jersey (along with his brother-in-law) is on the Internet Archive.

Every October it celebrates the "Festa della Castagna Calabrittana," a chestnut festival, crowning a queen ("la Castagna Regina"), and organizing hikes with the local group Calabritto Escursioni (excursions). These trips are called "Cascate e Castagne," or waterfalls and chestnuts. Participants gather chestnuts, sample chestnut products and local foods, and attend a festival in the town square. The area is also known for its mushrooms.

According to a previous version of this article, many of its citizens work for an industrial firm in Salerno. Some common Calabritto family names are Castagno, D`Alessio, Del Guercio, Di Mattia, Di Popolo, Di Trolio, Ficetola, Filippone, Fungaroli, Gonnella, Mattia, Megaro, Papa, Rizzolo, and Zecca.

== Landmarks ==
The ruins of the Lombard-era Castello di Quaglietta (Quaglietta castle) overlook the Sele valley. The castle may date to the Lombard era of 568 to 774. It has an irregular shape that may have been strategic. It was restored between 1988 and 2011.

La Madonna della Fiume (Madonna of the River) is one of the most interesting local churches, because it is located inside of a cave and is a popular site for day hikes. Il Santuario Madonna della Neve (Shrine of Our Lady of the Snow) was destroyed during the 1980 earthquake and rebuilt. However, its bell tower is original, with one of its two bells dating to 1759. The shrine sits at the edge of one of the mountain cliffs, and overlooks the Valle dell'Alto Sele from a distance of about 800 meters. One of the statues of the Madonna is from the 18th century. There is also a nearby Monastery of Santa Maria dell'Alta Sede.

There are waterfalls in the area, including the Bard'natore and the Cascata del Tuorno.

== Earthquakes ==
Both Calabritto and the larger region of Avellino have been affected by earthquakes throughout history. According to Maugeri and Carrubba, the region has seen 50 maximum-intensity earthquakes in the 2,000 years preceding 1997. These include the AD 62 Pompeii earthquake, the 1732 Irpinia earthquake, the 1805 Molise earthquake, the 1962 Irpinia earthquake, and most devastatingly for Calabritto, the 1980 Irpinia earthquake.

The latter, which took place on November 23, 1980, nearly destroyed the town, causing 100 deaths out of its then-3,200 population, and three hundred injuries. There were over 600 aftershocks of up to 4.2. 95% of its approximately 600 buildings were damaged. Some residents left and did not return, so its population dropped by about 20%, from 3,200 to 2,700. In the early 1960s it was 4,200.

== Origins of its name ==
According to the Italian counterpart to this page (https://it.wikipedia.org/wiki/Calabritto), the name "Calabritto" derives from the Latin "kalabrix," a thorny plant similar to the hawthorn, but the claim is not supported by an authoritative citation and seems dubious. Another theory connects it to an ancient Greek city, Kalavryta, with a similar terrain. This theory also cites a popular local legend, but none of these can be easily substantiated.
