= Ranzi (surname) =

Ranzi is a surname. Notable people with the surname include:

- Galatea Ranzi (born 1967), Italian actress
- Gian Matteo Ranzi (born 1948), Italian lightweight wrestler
- Ubaldo Ranzi (born 1970), Italian decathlete and bobsledder

== See also ==
- Lanzi
