= Inamdar =

Inamdar may refer to:

- Inamdar (feudal title), in India during the British Raj
- Inamdar (surname), an Indian surname
- Inamdar (2023 film), an Indian film

== See also ==
- Inam, a male given name
- Dar (disambiguation)
