= Bhāts =

Proclaimed genealogists and bards in India

Bhāt is a "generic term" used to refer to an oral repository or bard in India. The majority of Bhats hail from Rajasthan and worked as genealogists for their patrons, however, they are viewed as mythographers. In India, the inception of Rajputization was followed by the emanation of two groups of bards with a group of them serving the society's influential communities and the other serving the communities with lower ranking in the social hierarchy.

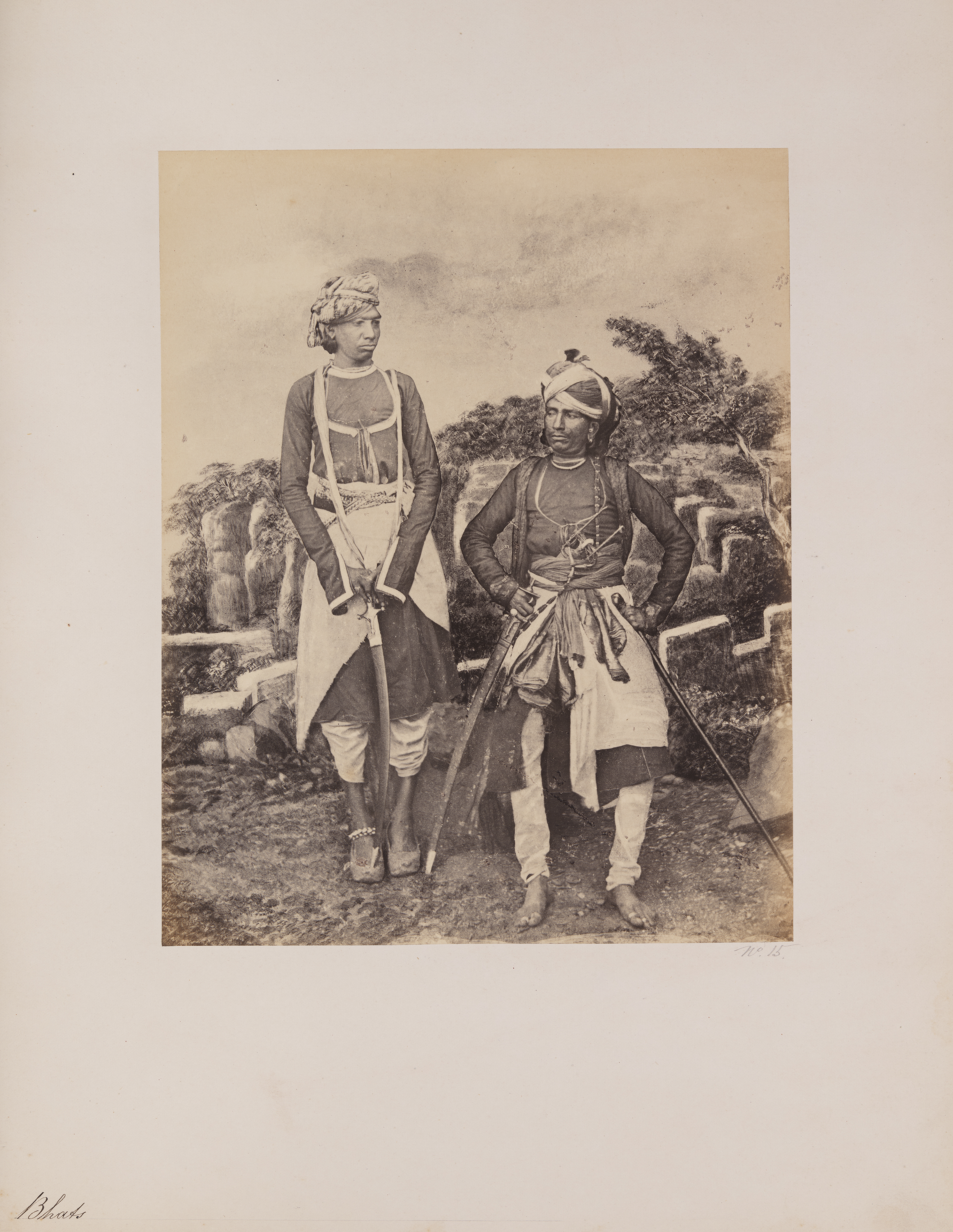
Bhats in western India (c. 1855–62)

Beginning from the 13th century and till the establishment of British rule in India, the bards serving the elites were at a higher position in the social hierarchy while the bards serving the non-elites were on a lower position with their social status parallelly experiencing directly proportional changes with the changes in the social standing of their patrons and the "quality of their service attachments". From the 16th century, the role of Bhats became very important in cementing the political legitimacy of the rulers. During the British colonial era in India, the Bhats were removed from their "positions of authority".

The present social status of the Bhats of lower castes is viewed as low in the society, and they attempt to Brahminize and Sanskritize themselves for improving their social standing. With changing times, they are moving out of villages to capitalize on the new political and economic opportunities.

The genealogical records that the Bhatts produced and maintained are similar to those that have been created and preserved by the Panda priests at Tirthas, known as Panda Bahis.

== Etymology ==
Jeffrey G. Snodgrass states that "'Bhat' is a generic term for 'bard', applied to a range of mythographers including those employed by village nobles". Anastasia Piliavsky views the words Bhat and bard as synonymous. According to Dharam Singh, the word Bhat belongs to the Sanskrit lexis and its literal meaning is "bard or panegyrist". He claims that it is a misbelief that "Bhat is an epithet for a learned Brahman".

=== Difference between भाट and भट्ट ===
The terms "भाट" (Bhāt) and "भट्ट" (Bhatt) are often confused because they sound similar and are written closely in Hindi. This confusion can lead to misunderstandings about their meanings and cultural significance, especially as people sometimes use different spellings interchangeably.

1. Bhat (Sanskrit: भाट ): Traditionally a storyteller or bard, not a Brahmin. Bhats preserve oral traditions and folklore but belong to distinct cultural identities. Some may randomly spell this as "Bhaat" or "Bhat," leading to further confusion.
2. Bhatt (Sanskrit: भट्ट) : Typically refers to learned individuals, often associated with Brahmin communities. Bhatts are recognized for their expertise in religious texts and rituals. Variations like "Bhatt" or "Bhaṭṭa" may also appear, but they generally point to the same cultural context. Sometimes people also spell Bhatta as Bhat, leading to confusion.

== Occupation and divisions ==
According to Anastasia Piliavsky, the beginning of Rajputization gave rise to two groups of bards — "elite" and "lowly". She suggests that the elite bards who worked for the dominating social groups, including the Rajputs, were composed of the genealogist Bhats and eulogist Charans. She further suggests that the lowly bards, who worked for numerous lower castes, were composed of the Bhats who worked as genealogists and entertainers for their patrons.

Piliavsky notes that the bards were in "high demand" among the people who were from diverse social backgrounds (e.g., leatherworkers, hill dwellers, big landowners) and wanted to achieve "upward social mobility" in order to attain the "Rajput status" as they were depend on the bards for their pedigrees' "production and maintenance". According to her, to have the Rajput status, only having freehold over land and being safeguarded by a feudal lord were not enough. She claims that to attain the Rajput status, a person also required "a pedigree, complete with sacred (purānic, or "epic") lineage, divine origins, and a patron deity". The social groups which had used the bardic services included the Bhils, Gurjars, Jats, Rabaris, and Rajputs. Piliavsky observes that the "bardic work in itself was not in disrepute" and states,

...royal and low-caste bards did identical work: they wrote, performed, and recorded panegyrics and genealogies (bansāvalis and pidāvalis). [..] Patron and bard, each afforded the other a claim to a clear "origin" — one genealogical, the other patronage-based, but both existentially crucial.

Snodgrass suggests that the Bhats who have traditionally worked for the Rajput princes as genealogical experts and privileged bards are an eponymous but different community from the Bhats who works as puppeteers and are also clienteles of the Bambhis. Snodgrass views the "high-status genealogists" of Rajputs and the "poets", "praise-singers" and "story-tellers" bards as "a very different group of people". According to Piliavsky, the Bhats who worked for the Rajputs "were the elite" and the Bhats who worked for the Bhils and Gurjars "were the riffraff".

=== Genealogy and political legitimacy ===
Some scholars like Anastasia Piliavsky, Dirk H. A. Kolff, and Harald Tambs-Lyche claims that the bards played a key role in securing political legitimacy of the ruling elites. They suggest,

From the early medieval period, and increasingly with the elaboration of the Rajput "great tradition" from the sixteenth century onward, genealogy emerged as the cornerstone of good social standing and political legitimacy in Western and Central India (Kolff 1990: 72, 110). [..] From the sixteenth century onward, "every royal clan depended on a line of bards for its recognition" (Tambs-Lyche 1997: 61), and by the mid-seventeenth, when the Rajput model became entrenched as the benchmark of social status and political legitimacy, "genealogical orthodoxy" was firmly established as an essential aspect of respectable standing (Kolff 1990: 73).

Snodgrass notes that the genealogies of Rajputs were intentionally linked to the ancient Kshatriyas who are spoken of in the ancient Sanskrit writings, and several times, their genealogies were imaginarily connected even to the sun and moon which aided in instating the "Rajput and thus Hindu glory". The Rajput status was augmented by the claims of Kshatriya ancestry of the Rajput community's members, and according to Snodgrass, that might have assisted in the legitimization of their dominion in the society. He is of the view that the claims of descent from the ancient Kshatriyas by the Rajputs helped them in advancing their feudatory states' interests in the British Raj.

In Rajasthan's feudatory states, the Bhats, Charans and "Jain monks of the monastic lineage" played an important part in the royal affairs which included enthronement and legitimation. Hira Singh notes that these three groups and Brahmins competed with each other in proffering "alternative narratives of major historical events relating to the kings and kingdoms". According to Hira Singh, the enthronement and legitimation in the feudatory states of Rajasthan were directed by the "political, economic, and administrative contingencies" and were not "rooted in religion". Ramya Sreenivasan claims that the Bhats, Charans and Jain monks imitated the Rajputs' lifestyle and used to view themselves in the same class as the Rajputs, not Brahmins.

=== Skillfulness and functions in society ===
Snodgrass notes that the bards could upgrade or degrade the reputation and honor of a king by their talented poetry and storytelling. According to Snodgrass, the Bhats cast kings like a sculptor sculpts a sculpture and "in the process, kings obtained their royal "caste" — that is, their name and social identity as well as their status, ranking, and position in society". During his field research in Rajasthan, Snodgrass was told by some Bhats that "bards had the power to make, or unmake, kings". Snodgrass claims,

...Bhats understand, and indeed cleverly manipulate, the idea that modern caste identity can be diversely constructed or invented against the foil of tradition as imagined by elites as diverse as foreign tourists and Indian bureaucrats staging folklore festivals. Indeed, Bhats suggest that this skill was the very basis of bardic power — to imagine the names, reputations, and very identities of their lords and thus to "cast" and "caste" them in some important respect.

Snodgrass compares the role of the Bhats and kings in the society with that of the directors and actors in movies.

== Origin claims and demographics ==
During his fieldwork in Rajasthan, Snodgrass observed that the royal Bhats of Rajasthan typically view themselves as descendants of the Brahmins who "long ago composed Sanskrit verse in praise of kings" and also maintained genealogies of the royals.

Snodgrass suggests that the Bhats, who according to him are eponymous but different people from the elite bards, also hail from Rajasthan. During his fieldwork, Snodgrass observed that the Bhats, who are "a community of low-status entertainers", l the pir Mala Nur, a Muslim saint who is also venerated by them, as the progenitor of their community. He suggests that the majority of their populace originated from Rajasthan's Nagaur and Sikar. They live in these 2 districts in thousands of numbers. They are also found in Jaipur and Udaipur. Some of them have originated from the western desert areas of Rajasthan. Snodgrass suggests that though these people call themselves Bhats, they "did not traditionally perform for nobility". He refers to them as the "low-caste Bhats".

Piliavsky claims that majority of the bards "came from the ranks of the vagrants".

== Social status ==
The social status of the Bhats had been dynamic, and it changed in direct proportion with the changes in social status of their patrons. As their patrons moved up in the social hierarchy, their own social status also improved. Besides the ranking of their patrons in the social hierarchy, the social status of bards was influenced by the "quality of their service attachments". Piliavsky suggests that the bards, whose relationship with their patrons became "more exclusive and durable", attained a higher social status.

Since the 13th century, the Bhats who were in the service of royals held "some of the highest social positions" just beneath their patrons, while the ones at the service of communities with lower social standing "remained on the periphery of social life". The Bhats and Charans serving the royals were given "permanent tax-free land grants" and an honorable place in the royal courts. According to Piliavsky, the bards of lower castes landed up at the lower end of social hierarchy as they served "lowly masters" and their "service ties remained intermediate, inchoate". During the British colonial era, the royal Bhats were removed from the "positions of authority".

=== Bards and Brahmins ===
Joanne Punzo Waghorne suggests that the bards and Brahmins carried out different duties. According to Waghorne, the Bhats "never performed pūjā, chanted prayers nor did they deal with Vedic scripture or Vedic law". She, however, claims that the role of bards in the courts was not less significant than that of the pandits and priests. According to Denis Vidal, the bards serving the royals had "equal, or even superior" social status than the Brahmins serving them. Anima Sharma claims that the social status of Bhats serving the kings was lower than the Brahmins and Rajputs but higher than the "other lower castes".

=== Brahminization by low-status Bhats ===
Snodgrass notes that some of the lowly Bhats attempt Brahminization of their identity by calling themselves Bhatts (short "uh") instead of Bhats (long "aah"), which according to him, is "a Brahmin caste name".

=== Sanskritization by low-status Bhats ===
Giving an example of goat sacrifice as an offering to Bhaironji by the lowly Bhats after the birth of a male child, Snodgrass states that they engage in Sanskritization of themselves by imitating "dominant Hindu ideals implicit to a kingly tradition of blood sacrifice".

== Present circumstances ==
Snodgrass observed that the low-status Bhats receive monetarily help from the people from Bhambi caste who give food and gifts to them. The Bhambis are perceived as impure and untouchables by a lot of Hindus because of their profession of making objects from leather which involves coming in touch with the decaying flesh of animals, something that is viewed as polluting by the caste Hindus, and because of their ties to the Bhambis, the Bhats are also seen with the same perception. He points out that in order to benefit from the "new economic and political opportunities", they are leaving the villages and are casting off their numerous long-term ties with the Bhambhis.

The tourism in Rajasthan serves as the main source of their income. In the recent times, they have started doing puppetry commingled with stories for the entertainment of tourists in 5-star hotels and during the folklore festivals. In their performances, they "celebrate" struggles of "Hindu warrior" against the "Muslim invaders". Carol Henderson claims that the palace–hotel owners of Rajasthan want to cater exoticism and nostalgia to their guests and Snodgrass says that they serve this purpose of the hotel owners. According to Snodgrass, they were not royal bards but they pose as "the once glorious, though now fallen, bards of royalty" to "exploit the romantic fantasies of tourists and folklore organizers". Snodgrass notes that they have significantly improved their economic condition by capitalizing on the influx of tourists in Rajasthan.

== Bhatra Sikhs ==
The Bhatra Sikhs (also known as Bhat Sikhs) are a sub-group within the Sikhs who originated from the bards of the time of Guru Nanak. According to William Hewat McLeod, the Bhatra Sikhs have an "extremely small" population and they are from some villages of the Gurdaspur and Sialkot districts of the Punjab region. However they seem to be different from Rajasthan bhat(भाट) community and originally Brahmin Bhatt by caste who does the work of bards in Sikh Gurus court.

== See also ==
- Barot (caste)
