= Rubber technology =

Rubber Technology is the subject dealing with the transformation of rubbers or elastomers into useful products, such as automobile tires, rubber mats and, exercise rubber stretching bands. The materials includes latex, natural rubber, synthetic rubber and other polymeric materials, such as thermoplastic elastomers. Rubber processed through such methods are components of a wide range of items.

Rubber products can be categorized into two main categories.

- Dry rubber products (dry form)
- Latex (wet rubber) products (liquid form)

== Vulcanization ==
Most rubber products are vulcanized, a process which involves heating with a small quantity of sulphur (or equivalent cross-linking agent) so as to stabilise the polymer chains, over a wide range of temperature. This discovery was made by Charles Goodyear in 1844, but is a process restricted to polymer chains having a double bond in the backbone. Such materials include natural rubber and polybutadiene. The range of materials available is much wider however, since all polymers become elastomeric above their glass transition temperature. However, the elastomeric state is unstable because chains can slip past one another resulting in creep or stress relaxation under static or dynamic load conditions. Chemical cross links add the stability to the network that is needed for most practical applications.

== Processing of rubber ==
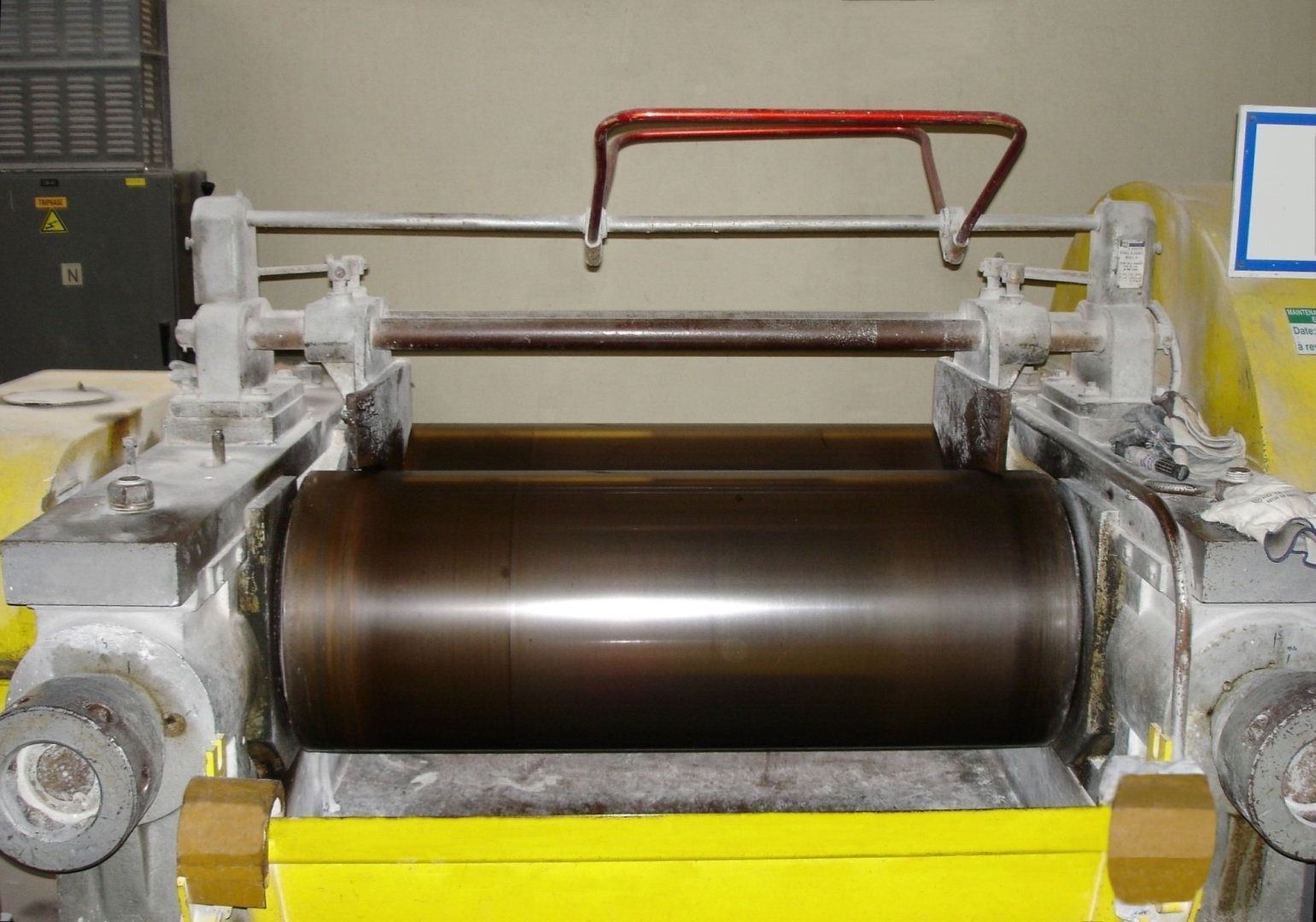
Milling to soften raw rubber and mix dry ingredients into the compound

Methods for processing rubber include mastication and various operations like mixing, calendering, extrusion, all processes being essential to bring crude rubber into a state suitable for shaping the final product. The former breaks down the polymer chains, and lowers their molecular mass so that viscosity is low enough for further processing. After this has been achieved, various additions can be made to the material ready for cross-linking. Rubber may be masticated on a two-roll mill or in an industrial mixer, which come in different types.

Rubber is first compounded with additives like sulfur, carbon black and accelerators. It is converted into a dough-like mixture which is called "compound" then milled into sheets of desired thickness. Rubber may then be extruded or molded before being cured.

== See also ==
- Brazilian Rubber Technology Association
- Charles Goodyear Medal
- Synthetic rubber
- Thermoplastic elastomer
- Vulcanization
