= Frank Rio =

American mobster

Franklin Rio
- Born: June 30, 1895; Oliveto Citra, Italy
- Died: February 23, 1935 (aged 39); Chicago, Illinois, US
- Other name: Frank Cline

Franklin Rio also known as "Frank Rio" and "Frank Cline" (June 30, 1895 – February 23, 1935) was a member of Al Capone's Chicago-based criminal organization known as the Chicago Outfit.

== Early life ==
According to his birth certificate, Frank Rio was born July 2, 1895, in Oliveto Citra, Italy, to Antonio and Rosa (Costa) Rio.

Rio married the former Anna Chapele in the mid-1910s. The couple had one son, Lawrence, born 1922.

== Organized crime involvement ==
Rio's involvement in crime began early in life, and included robbery, burglary, and auto theft. In 1918, he was arrested several times in connection with several different hold-ups. In September 1918, he was arrested for robbing a bank in Maywood, but never convicted. On November 10, 1919, Rio was arrested after police caught him loading stolen furs into a stolen vehicle. On January 17, 1921, Rio—along with Robert O'Neill and Thomas Dyer—robbed a mail train at Chicago's Union Station, stealing bonds worth $482,000. Although indicted for the daring daylight robbery, Rio was never brought to trial and the charges dropped. Rio's ability to escape punishment could not be attributed to good luck or innocence but rather to the bribing of judges and the intimidation and murder of witnesses. In time, criminal elements dubbed him "Slippery" Frank Rio for his knack of evading trial.

=== Capone gang ===
Rio's criminal exploits brought him to the attention of Al Capone, leader of the Chicago Outfit. Capone quickly came to trust Rio's judgment, and Rio became intensely loyal to Capone. Rio eventually became one of Capone's personal bodyguards and took care of some of Capone's personal needs and business. Capone himself is rumored to have said that Jack McGurn and Rio were his "golden boys".

Rio became one of Capone's most valuable and loyal henchmen. He allegedly once threw Capone to the ground during a hit by Earl "Hymie" Weiss. Rio also is said to have foiled a plot by Albert Anselmi, John Scalise and Joseph Guinta to depose Capone and take over the Chicago Outfit. Underworld figures later claimed that Rio was one of the trio's executioners.

Rio also attended the 1929 Atlantic City Conference with Capone. Capone arranged to have himself jailed in Philadelphia after the conference in order to avoid the numerous "murder-for-hire" rackets that were hunting him. Rio served time alongside Capone to protect him and see to his needs.

Rio was allegedly one of the few members of Capone's gang who understood the seriousness of the tax evasion charges made against Capone by the federal government in 1931. However, he was unable to convince Capone of this, and Capone was convicted and imprisoned.

After Capone was sent to federal prison, Rio was considered as his successor. But Rio was opposed by many high-level mobsters in the Capone organization. Many thought he had too little leadership experience. Several gangsters also accused Rio of having "gone soft" due to his years of "high living" he had enjoyed alongside Capone. Rio was eventually passed over in favor of another Capone hitman and lieutenant, Frank Nitti.

=== Post-Capone activities ===
Although Rio never left the Capone mob, his association with it dwindled over the next several years. In 1932, the Chicago Outfit sent Rio to New Jersey to offer the mob's assistance in helping Charles Lindbergh find his kidnapped baby son. His assistance was refused. Rio's health also began to deteriorate. He suffered from heart disease, which caused severe shortness of breath and physical weakness. Beginning in 1933, he rarely left his Oak Park home. However, he maintained financial interests in a number of cafes, nightclubs and casinos.

== Death ==
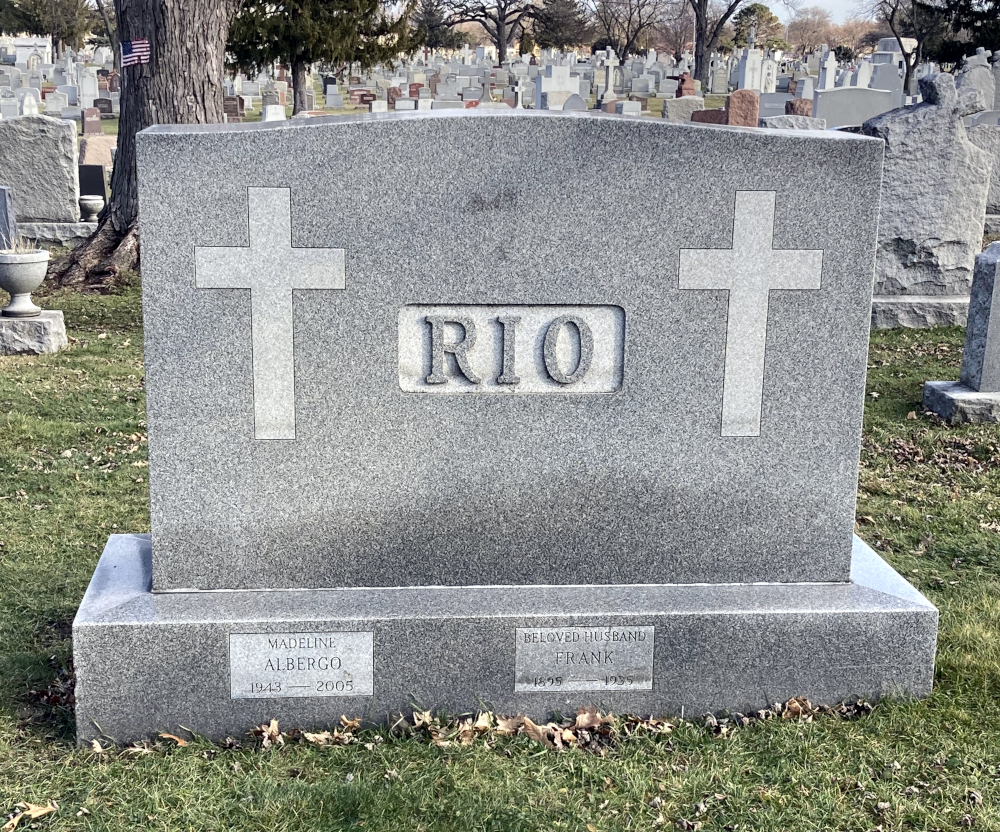
Rio's grave at Mount Carmel Cemetery

Frank Rio died at noon on February 23, 1935. The cause of death was a coronary occlusion, causing a heart attack.

Associates in the Chicago Outfit took charge of his remains and had him buried. Police later said that gang members became involved in his burial because they wanted to divide up Rio's gang-owned assets before news of his death hit the streets.

Although Rio was a Roman Catholic, the Church denied him a church funeral. A priest said prayers over his body at a local undertakers instead. As befitting a high-level mobster, his funeral was an exceedingly large one. Several hundred automobiles bearing mourners comprised the funeral cortege. He was interred in Mount Carmel Cemetery in Hillside, Illinois.

Rio's widow, Anna, got remarried on November 29, 1935, to Charles Taskoski. She died shortly after the marriage in an automobile accident on December 26, 1935. She left behind a large amount of jewelry and cash. According to family members, mobsters later intimidated the family into turning the valuables and cash over to the Chicago Outfit.

== In popular culture ==
Frank Rio was portrayed by Ron Smith in the 2017 film Gangster Land.
