= Bhaironji =

Hindu god

- Affiliation: Hindu god of the underworld

Bhaironji is a Hindu god of the underworld in Rajasthan, India. Some scholars note that he is viewed as form of Shiva in Rajasthan.

Jeffrey G. Snodgrass (professor of anthropology at the Colorado State University) notes that Bhaironji is seen as "a pan–Indian boss of the underworld".

== Bhaironji and Balaji ==
Bhaironji, along with Pretraj, is believed to be an assistant deity of Balaji. They are viewed as the foremost prosecutors of Balaji and believed to provide legal assistance to him during the trials of the Bhuts who have possessed people, at Balaji's temple in Rajasthan.

== Rituals by devotess ==
Snodgrass states that upon the birth of a male child, the Bhats in India offer "gifts" to Bhaironji, especially a ritual sacrifice of goat. He relates this practice to Sanskritisation and observes,

Specifically, they sacrifice a goat, extract its stomach, slice it open so that it forms a gaping slit, and pass their wailing newborn through the dripping opening seven times. This ritual, which I interpret as a symbolic child sacrifice, would seem to exemplify ‘Sanskritisation’—the low caste copying of elite life‐styles—in the way Bhats imitate dominant Hindu ideals implicit to a kingly tradition of blood sacrifice. ...this feast is unique in the way that Bhats simultaneously mimic and appropriate, subvert and contest, as well as rework and combine ritual traditions associated with both kings and priests.

== Possession ==
According to Snodgrass, Bhaironji is believed to sometimes possess people.
