= Lenzi (surname) =

Lenzi is an Italian surname. Notable people with the surname include:

- Andrea Lenzi (born 1988), Italian coxswain
- Aurelio Lenzi (1891–1967), Italian athlete
- Damiano Lenzi (born 1987), Italian ski mountaineer and cross-country skier, and soldier
- Diego Lenzi (born 2001), Italian boxer
- Eugene J. Lenzi, American racing driver
- Giovanni Battista Lenzi (1951–2009), Italian politician
- Lio Lenzi (1898–1960), Italian politician
- Mark Lenzi (1968–2012), American diver and diving coach
- Michele Lenzi (1834–1886), Italian painter
- Umberto Lenzi (1931–2017), Italian film director, screenwriter and novelist
