= San Girolamo, Cremona =

Church building in Cremona, Italy

San Girolamo is a 17th-century, Baroque style, Roman Catholic church on Via Sicardo 5, in Cremona, region of Lombardy, Italy. It is also known as the Oratory of San Girolamo.

== History ==
A church at the site had existed since 1386, and in 1456 had become home to an Oratory of the Confraternity of Santa Maria della Misericordia and of San Giovanni Decollato. The latter provided confessions and burial to those condemned to die. The present church was built in 1616. The facade however has a Neoclassical simplicity surmounted by an awkward Palladian window. The presbytery was completed in 1657 by A. Capra with a cupola.

== Description ==
The interior ceilings, cupola, and were decorated by a series of painters in the 18th-century. The walls and cupola were a collaboration of Francesco Monti painting figures, and Giovanni Zanardi painting quadratura; however the apse was the product of Giovanni Battista Zaist and Antonio Maria Panni.
