= Bagnoli Irpino =

- Comune
- Comune di Bagnoli Irpino
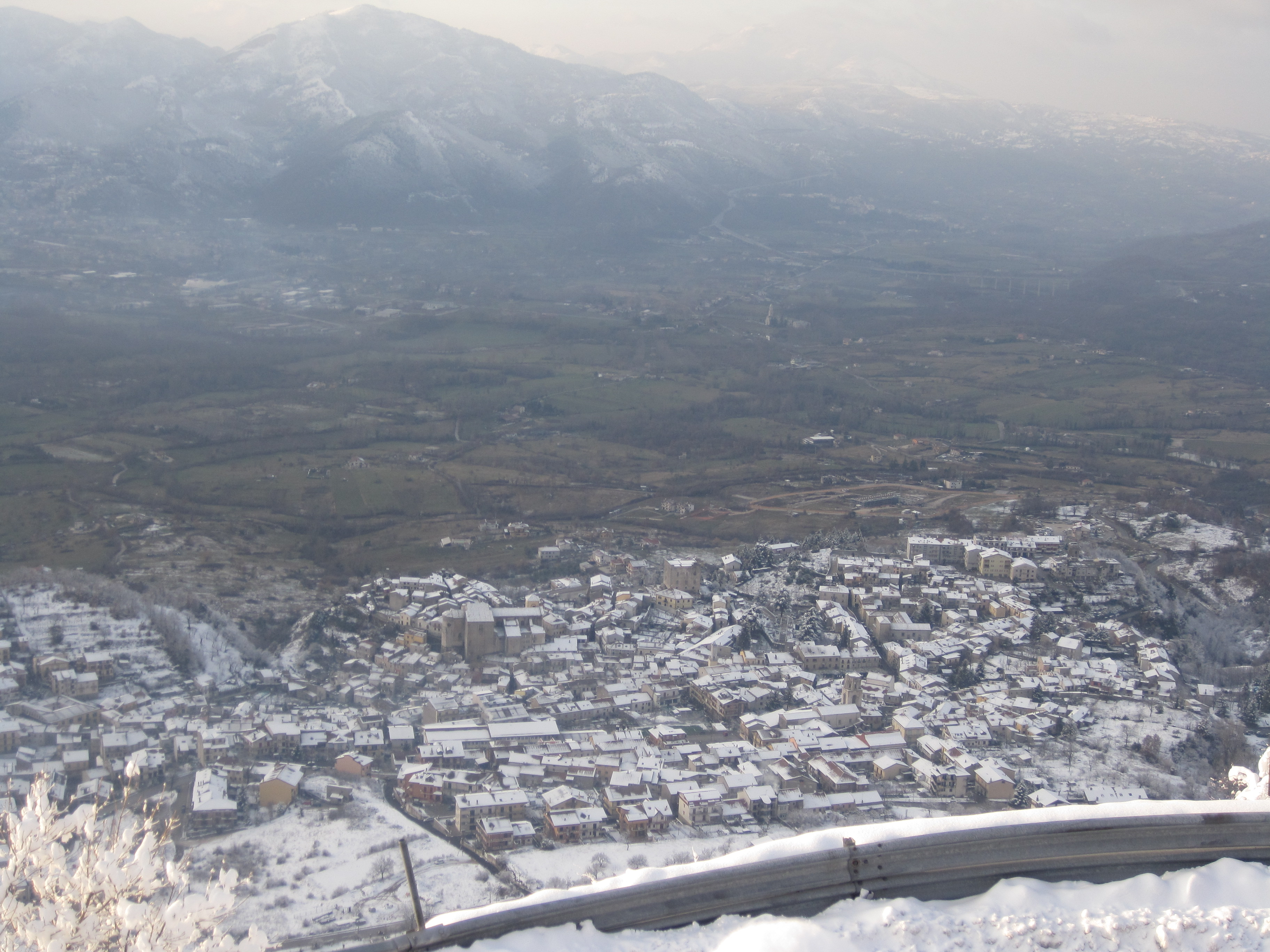
- Winter view.

- Coat of arms

- Location within Italy Location within Campania
- Coordinates: 40°50′3″N 15°4′24″E
- Country: Italy
- Region: Campania
- Province: Avellino (AV)
- Frazioni: Laceno

Government
  - Mayor: Filippo Nigro

Area
  - Total: 68.81 km^{2} (26.57 sq mi)
- Elevation: 654 m (2,146 ft)

Population (31 December 2017)
  - Total: 3,139
  - Density: 45.62/km^{2} (118.2/sq mi)
- Demonym: Bagnolesi
- Time zone: UTC+1 (CET)
  - Summer (DST): UTC+2 (CEST)
- Postal code: 83043
- Dialing code: 0827
- Patron saint: St. Lawrence
- Saint day: August 10
- Website: Official website

Bagnoli Irpino (Irpinian: Vagnulo) is a town and comune in the province of Avellino, Campania, Italy.

The bordering municipalities of Bagnoli are Acerno, Calabritto, Caposele, Lioni, Montella and Nusco.

The only frazione is Laceno, a village and ski resort situated in the Picentini mountains.

== Notable people ==
- Michele Lenzi, painter
- The Cavaniglia,

family;was a noble family who arrived in the Kingdom of Naples from Spain following King Alfonso V of Aragon in the first quarter of the 15th century from Valencia The Cavaniglia family had the titles of counts of Montella and Troia, Celle, Galiano, Montalto, Sangiorgio and Vitulano, marquises of San Marco dei Cavoti and dukes of Santagata, Flumeri, Rodi and San Giovanni Rotondo . They lived between the court of Naples and the palace of Montella . They died out in the 18th century with:Anna Cavaniglia, princess of Sant'Antimo.

== Note ==
The founder in the Kingdom of Naples was Garzia I, who arrived in Italy in 1418 in the retinue of Alfonso V of Aragon, belonging to the Cabanillas dynasty of Valencia and nephew of the viceroy of Valencia, Pietro Cabanillas. He was one of the architects of the Aragonese conquest of the Kingdom of Naples and became the king's ambassador to Pope Nicholas V. In 1445 he purchased from the sovereign for 11,000 ducats the fiefdom including the territories of Montella, Bagnoli irpino and Cassano Irpino (current province of Avellino )

Bagnoli irpino is known for the Laceno lake, with many forests of chestnut, oak, beech and fruit trees such as figs and apples

annexed in its territory, for the production of the Black Truffle, and the Chestnut.

The chestnuts of Bagnoli Irpino are included in the controlled designation of origin (DOC) "Castagna di Montella",

which is also a Protected Geographical Indication (PGI). This means that the production area,

which also includes Montella, Cassano Irpino, Volturara Irpina, Nusco and Montemarano, is specifically delimited and the chestnuts must respect certain characteristics in order to be recognized with this designation.

== History ==
Already in 571, therefore with the Lombards, the importance of cultivation was understood and thus the first law for the protection of the fruit was issued, evidently already considered a precious resource at the time. The Castle of Bagnoli Irpino is located on the top of the Serra hill, in a dominant position over the Alta Valle del Calore.
