= Panni =

Panni may refer to:

- Plural of Latin pannus

== Geography ==
- Panni, Apulia, village in the province of Foggia in southeast Italy
- Panni (Pashtun tribe), in Afghanistan and Pakistan

== People ==
- Antonio Maria Panni (1730-1790), Italian painter and art historian
- Daud Khan Panni (died 1715), Mughal commander
- Humayun Khan Panni (died 2006), Bangladesh politician
- Morshed Ali Khan Panni, Bangladesh politician
- Muhammad Bayazeed Khan Panni, Bangladesh politician, doctor, writer, and social reformer
- Nicoletta Panni (1933–2017), Italian lyric soprano
- Raissa Khan-Panni, also known as Raissa (born 1971), English singer-songwriter
- Wazed Ali Khan Panni (1871–1936), Bengali Zamidar, politician, and philanthropist
