= Antonio Maria Panni =

Italian painter

Antonio Maria Panni (circa 1730–1790) was an Italian painter and art historian. He collaborated in a number of quadratura projects with Giovanni Battista Zaist, including the church of San Girolamo in Cremona. He also provided engravings for Zaist's 1774 Notizie istoriche de' pittori, scultori, ed architetti cremonesi (Biographies of Cremonese artists). He also authored a monograph titled Distinto rapporto delle dipinture, che trovansi nelle chiese della città e sobborghi di Cremona, published in Cremona in 1762.
