= Laceno =

- Frazione
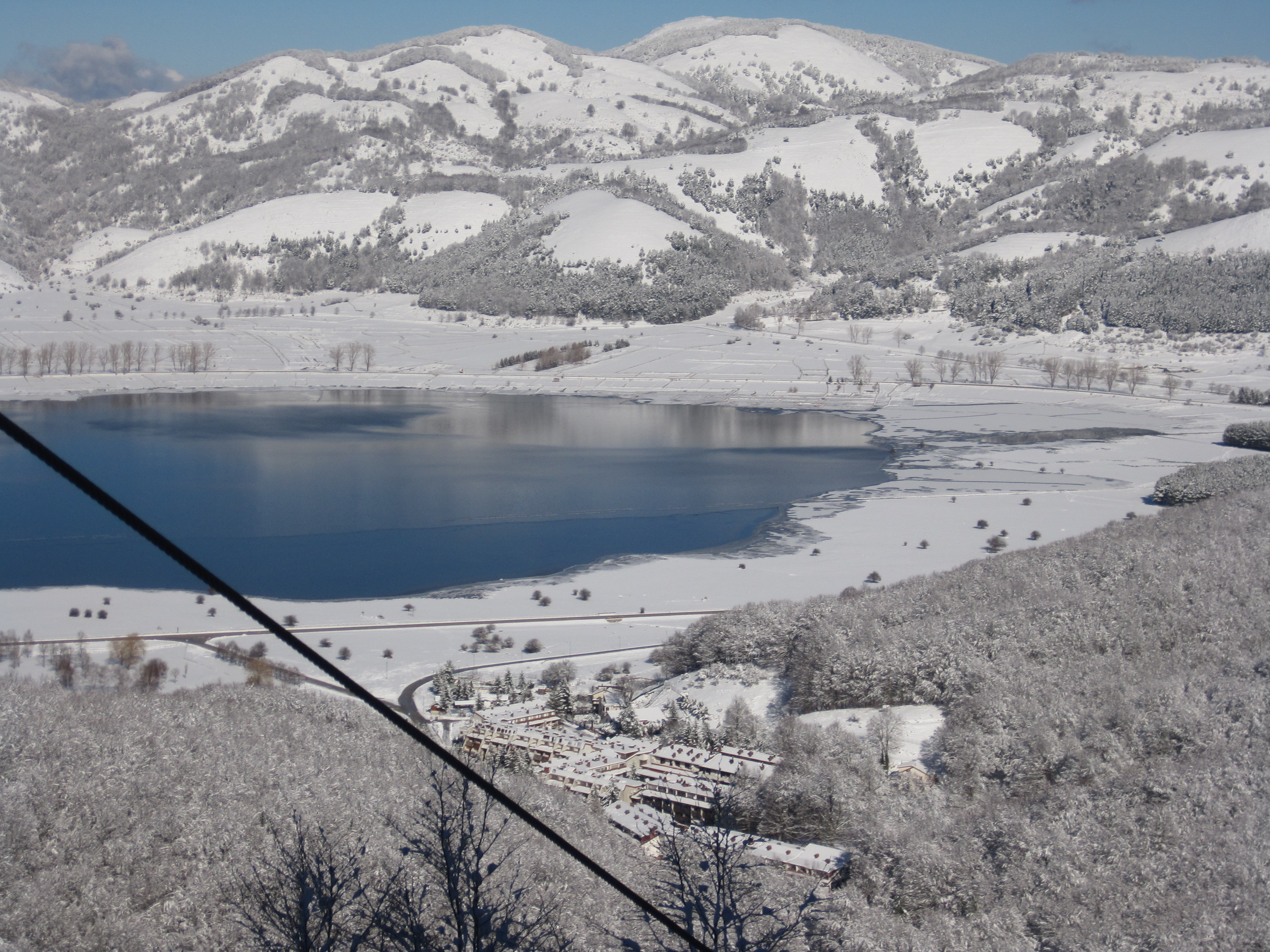
- Laceno and lake in winter

- Location of Laceno in Italy
- Coordinates: 40°48′30″N 15°6′40″E
- Country: Italy
- Region: Campania
- Province: Avellino (AV)
- Comune: Bagnoli Irpino
- Elevation: 1,050–1,090 m (3,440–3,580 ft)

Population (2010)
  - Total: 300
- Demonym: Lacenini
- Time zone: UTC+1 (CET)
  - Summer (DST): UTC+2 (CEST)
- Postal code: 83043
- Dialing code: 0827
- Website: Official website

Laceno is an Italian hamlet (frazione) and ski resort situated in the municipality of Bagnoli Irpino, Province of Avellino, Campania. It includes a Ski Resort (with 18 km of ski Slopes) with artificial snow if required, a lake with food area, Caliendo Caves and a Trekking Point.

== History ==
The Village was born in 1956, as a summer resort, with outdoor sports and a Neorealist Film Festival film festival awarding the "Laceno d'Oro" (Golden Laceno), since moved to Avellino. Between 1972 and 1975 the ski-lift was built and Laceno became a summer and winter resort. The village, today, consists of some hotels, residence, holiday-homes, wooden buildings (used by Ski and Sport rentals) and restaurants.

== Geography ==
=== Overview ===
Laceno, also known as Piano Laceno or Lago Laceno, is situated in the eastern side of its province, not too far from the borders with the Province of Salerno. It lies in a forest plain, at 1,000 amsl, of Cervialto and Raiamagra mountains; parts of the Picentini mountain range. It is 8 km from Bagnoli Irpino, 15 from Montella, 20 Nusco, 40 from Avellino and 71 from Naples.

The settlement is built around the southern side of a little lake (Lago Laceno), originally a swamp and served by the river Tornola, who has reduced its surface after 1980 Irpinia earthquake, due to some holes opened in the crust. Not too far from Laceno there are some caves (Grotte del Caliendo), discovered in 1992 by Giovanni Rama.

=== How to arrive ===
Laceno is part of Avellino municipality. The nearest highway A16 (the one from Naples to Bari) takes about 30 minutes from Laceno, it's easy to reach thanks to the direct road that links Montella city to Avellino city. The nearest Airport is Naples Airport at circa 100 km

== Tourism ==
As ski area and resort, the locality is strongly receptive for tourism, especially in the periods from December to March. Laceno has got a chairlift that ride up mount Raiamagra with 3 stops: Laceno (1,100 amsl; on the village); Settevalli (1,400 amsl, interchange stop) and Raiamagra (1,700 amsl). Laceno has also some electrics carpets, to learn how to ski. There are a lot of playground for children who wants to enjoy the snow, with wooden games.

== Gallery ==
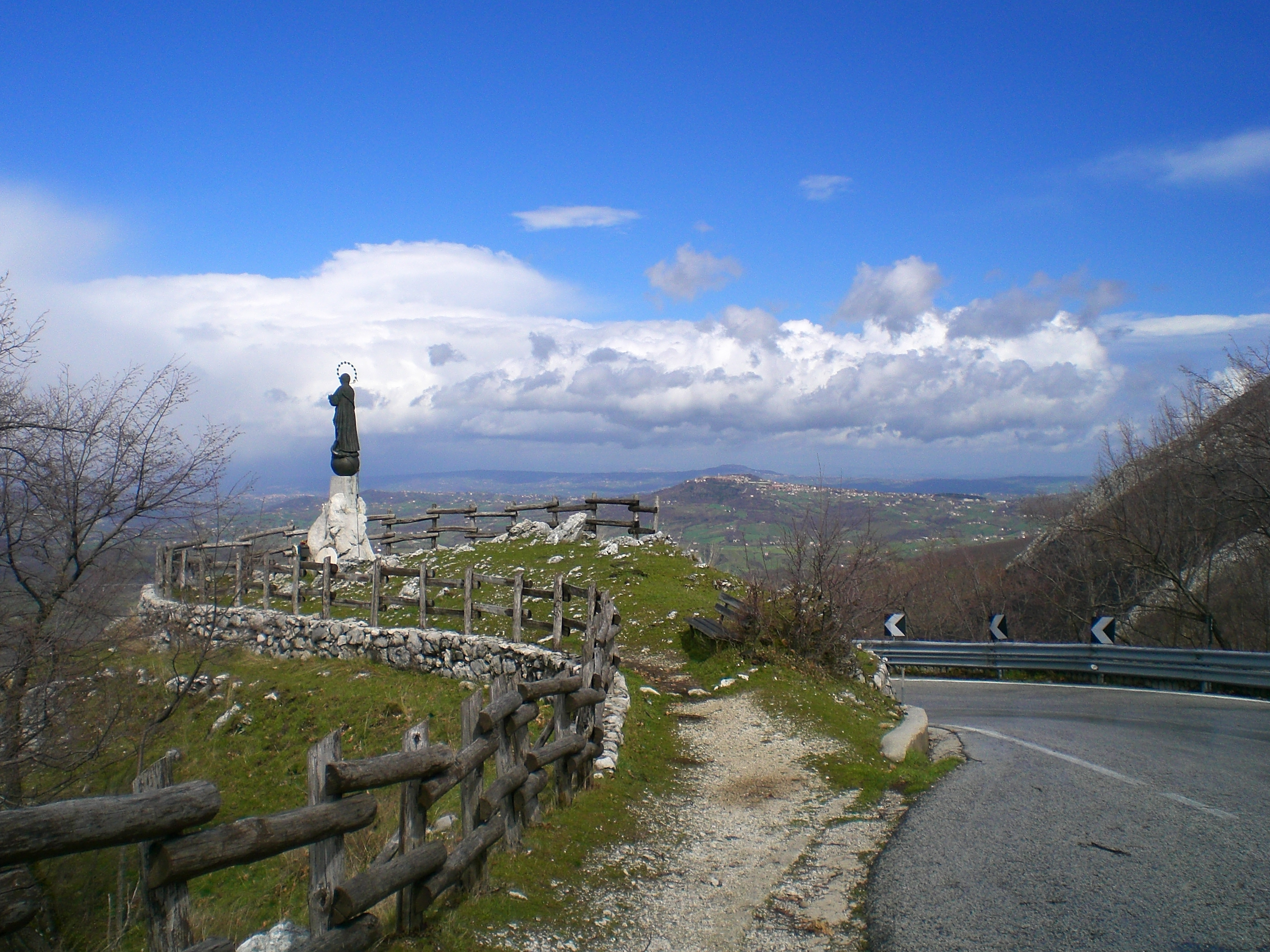
The road from Bagnoli before entering Laceno

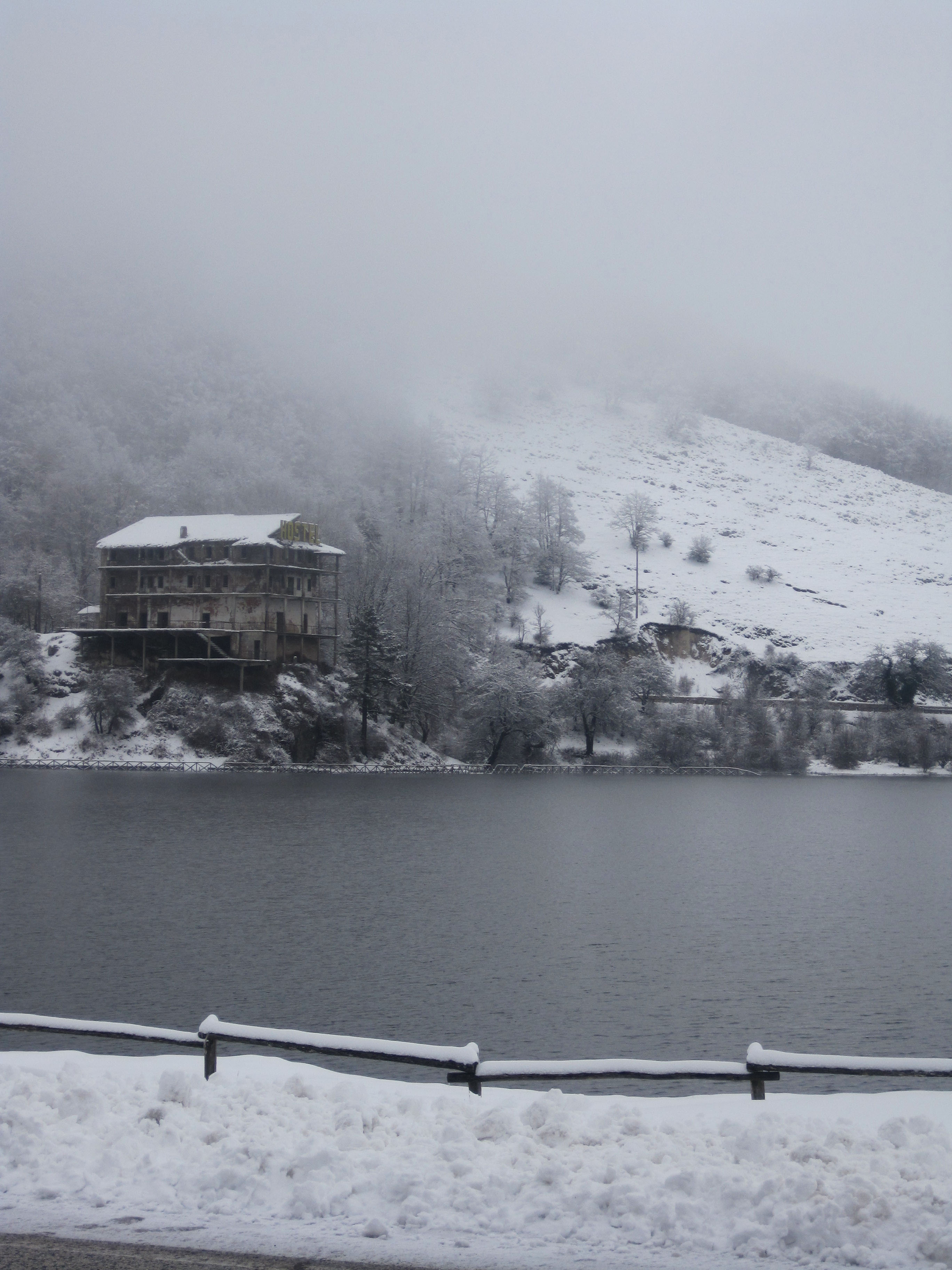
The old Hotel on the lake

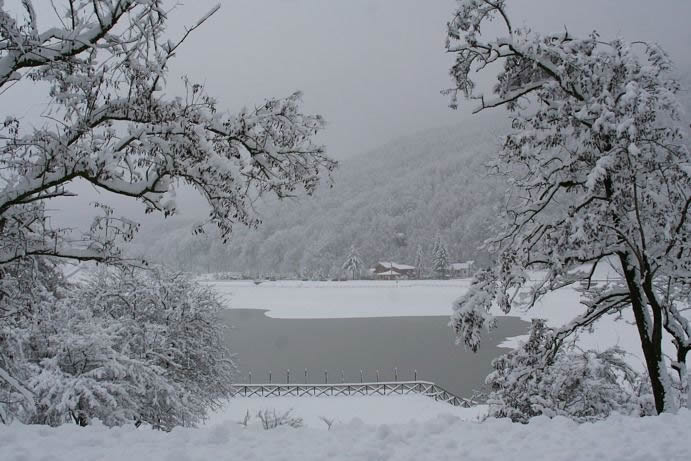
Lake Laceno with snow (winter 2005)

== See also ==
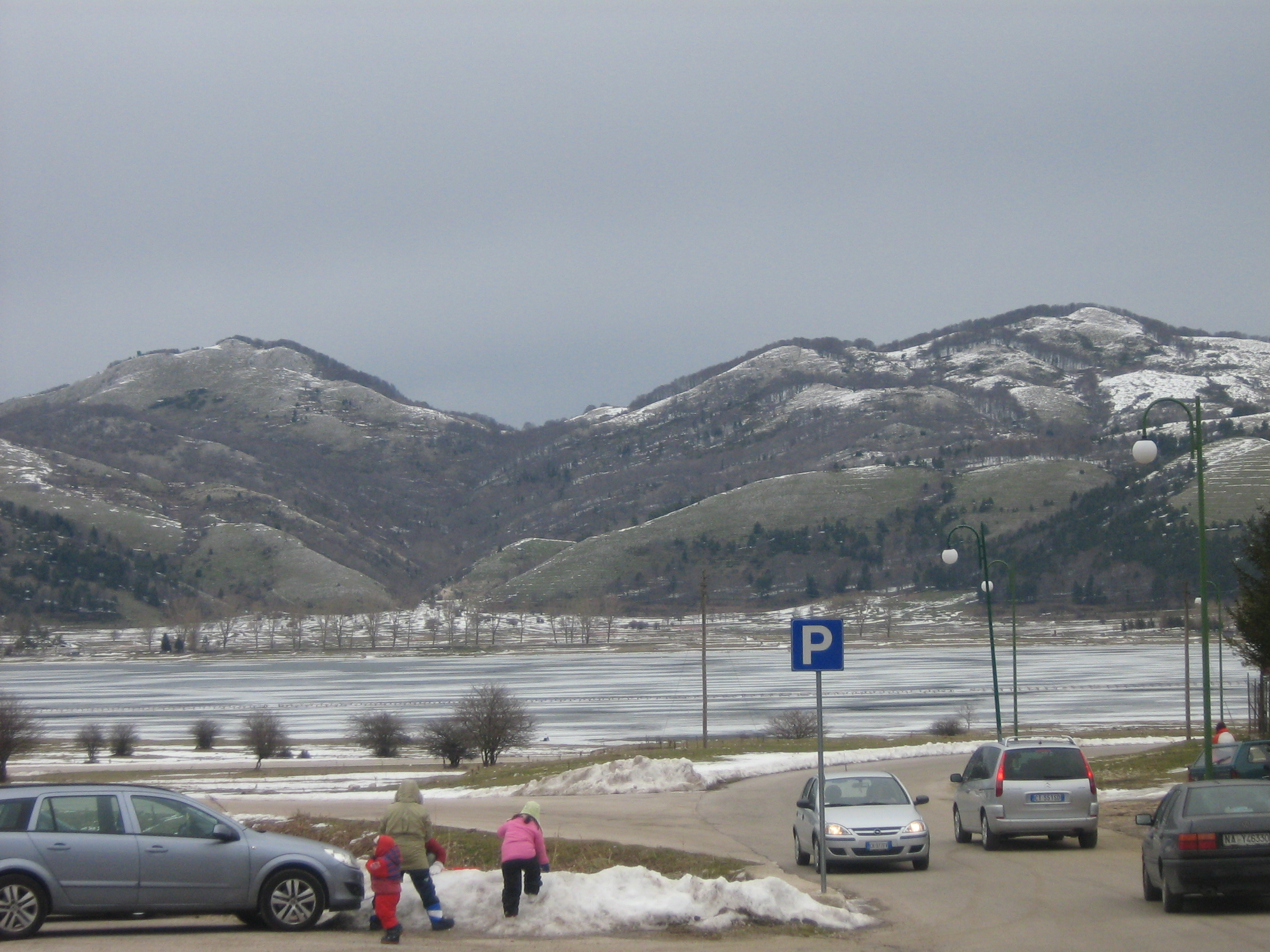
View of the frozen lake

- List of ski areas and resorts in Italy
