= Sele (river) =

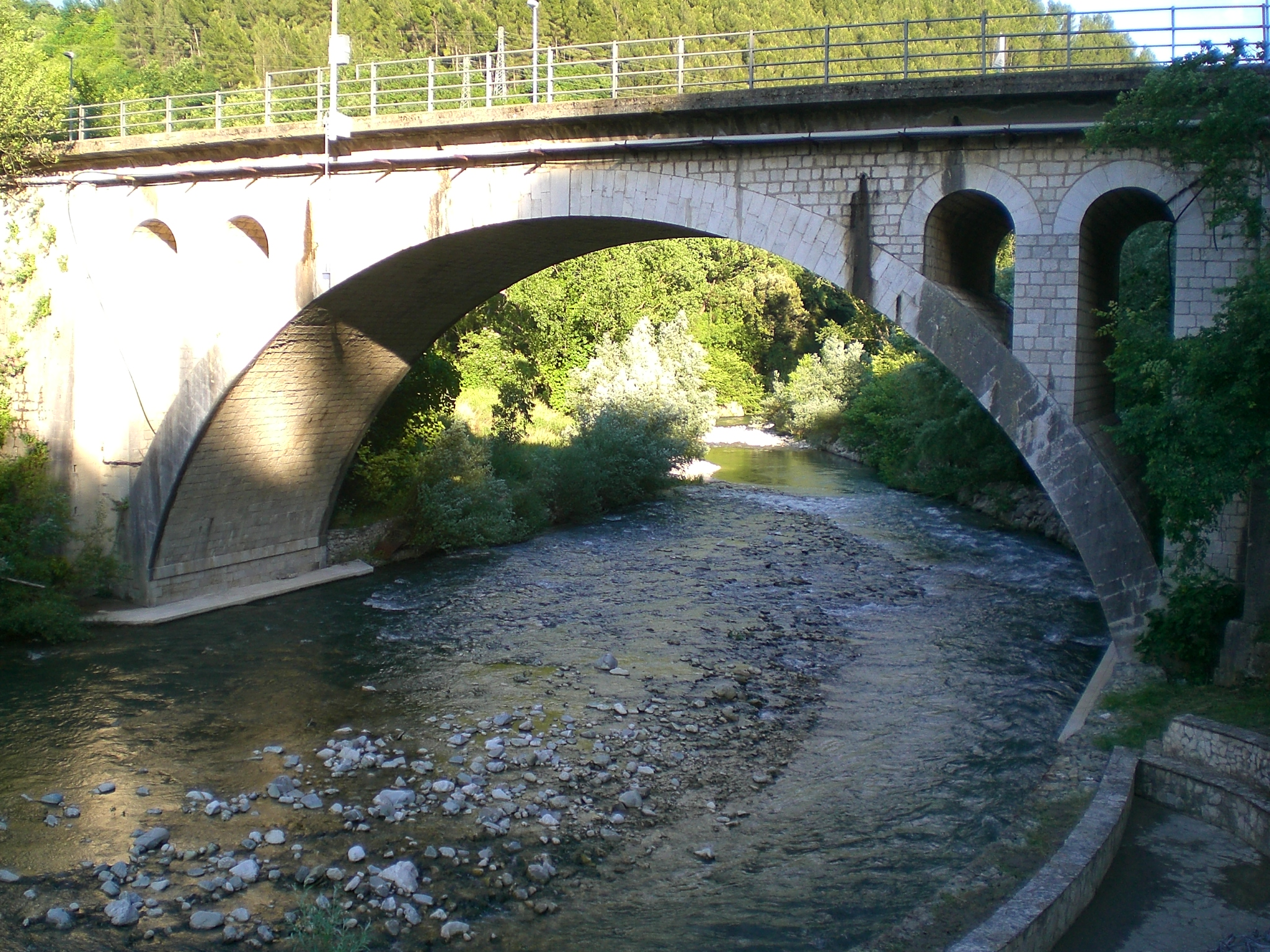

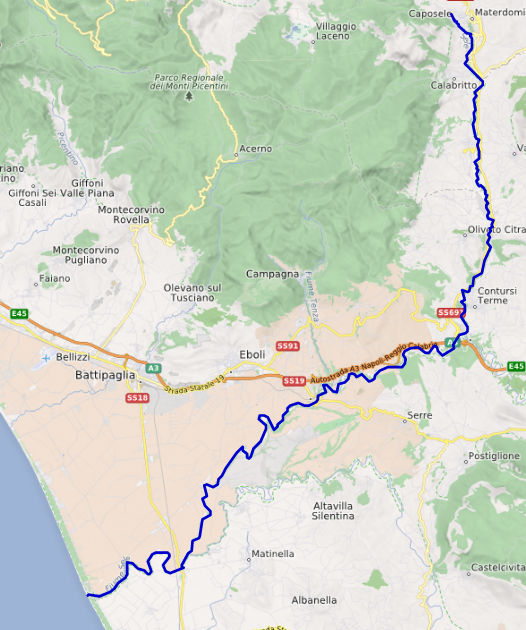

Location
- Country: Italy

Physical characteristics
- Source
  - location: Monte Paflagone, Caposele
- Mouth: Tyrrhenian Sea
  - location: near Paestum
  - coordinates: 40.4821°N 14.9427°E
- Length: 64 km (40 mi)
- Basin size: 3,223 km^{2} (1,244 mi^{2})
- Discharge
  - average: 69 m^{3}/s (2,400 cu ft/s)

The Sele is a river in southwestern Italy. Originating from the Monti Picentini in Caposele, it flows through the region of Campania, in the provinces of Salerno and Avellino. Its mouth is in the Gulf of Salerno, on the Tyrrhenian Sea, at the borders between the municipalities of Eboli and Capaccio (not too far from Paestum), at the beginning point of Cilentan Coast.

== History ==
The important Greek site of Foce del Sele, a sanctuary complex dedicated to the goddess Hera, is at the ancient mouth of the river, though little remains on the site; the relief friezes and other finds are now in the museum at Paestum. At this period the Sele represented the border of the Greek and Etruscan zones of influence along the coast.

== Hydrography ==
In terms of average water discharge of southern Italian rivers, it is second only to the Volturno. Its main tributaries are the Tanagro, the Calore Lucano and the Tenza. In ancient times it was known as Silarus. This river is the location of the battle of the Silarus in which Hannibal won a major victory over the Romans, and it is also the place of the battle in which Spartacus and his rebellion was defeated by Marcus Licinius Crassus and his legions.

== Geography ==
The municipalities crossed by the river, from the mouth to the origin, are Eboli, Capaccio, Albanella, Serre, Campagna, Contursi Terme, Oliveto Citra, Colliano, Senerchia, Valva, Calabritto and Caposele. Despite its name, demonym of the river, the municipality of Altavilla Silentina is not crossed by Sele.
