= Asim Bhaumik =

Indian researcher

- Citizenship: Indian
- Occupations: Chemist, scientist

Asim Bhaumik is an Indian chemist and materials scientist who has worked in the design of novel porous materials for energy and environmental applications.

== Education ==
In 1997, Bhaumik earned his Ph.D. in Chemistry from the National Chemical Laboratory, Pune, India. Upon completing his doctoral studies, he worked as a JSPS postdoctoral fellow at the University of Tokyo, Japan between 1997 and 1999, and then served as an Associate Researcher at Toyota Central R&D Labs, Japan from 1999 to 2001.

== Academic career and research ==
He later joined the Indian Association for the Cultivation of Science in Kolkata, where he currently serves as a senior professor. Within the Department of Materials Science, he served as Senior Lecturer from 2001 to 2005, Associate Professor from 2005 to 2009, and Professor from 2009 to 2014. From 2014 he is a Senior Professor.

In April 2025, he was appointed Associate Editor of Green Chemistry.

His research focuses on developing novel organic, inorganic, and organic–inorganic hybrid porous materials for energy and environmental applications, creating heterogeneous catalysts for CO₂ fixation into fuels and fine chemicals, and advancing green hydrogen technologies. He has published over 540 research papers and filed 16 patents. Bhaumik's publications have received over 29,000 citations, with an h-index of 94 as of August 2025.

== Honors ==
- 2024: Materials Research Society of India annual prize winner
- 2012: Fellow of the Royal Society of Chemistry
- 2011: Materials Research Society of India medal
- 2006: Ramanna Fellowship, DST-SERB

== Selected publications ==
- Dutta, Saikat; Bhaumik, Asim; Wu, Kevin C.-W. (2014). "Hierarchically porous carbon derived from polymers and biomass: effect of interconnected pores on energy applications". Energy Environ. Sci. 7 (11): 3574–3592. doi:10.1039/C4EE01075B.
- Chowdhury, Avik; Bhattacharjee, Sudip; Chatterjee, Rupak; Bhaumik, Asim (2022). "A new nitrogen rich porous organic polymer for ultra-high CO2 uptake and as an excellent organocatalyst for CO2 fixation reactions". Journal of CO2 Utilization. 65, 102236. doi:10.1016/j.jcou.2022.102236.
- Bhaumik, Asim; Inagaki, Shinji (2001). "Mesoporous Titanium Phosphate Molecular Sieves with Ion-Exchange Capacity". Journal of the American Chemical Society. 123 (4): 691–696. doi:10.1021/ja002481s.
- Bhattacharjee, Sudip; Tripathi, Anjana; Chatterjee, Rupak; Thapa, Ranjit; Mueller, Thomas E.; Bhaumik, Asim (2024). "N-Heterocyclic Carbene Moiety in Highly Porous Organic Hollow Nanofibers for Efficient CO2 Conversions: A Comparative Experimental and Theoretical Study". ACS Catalysis. 14 (2): 718-727. doi:10.1021/acscatal.3c05576.
- Kumar, Rajiv; Bhaumik, Asim; Ahedi, Ranjeet Kaur; Ganapathy, Subramanian (1996). "Promoter-induced enhancement of the crystallization rate of zeolites and related molecular sieves". Nature. 381 (6580): 298–300. doi:10.1038/381298a0
