= Michele Lenzi =

Italian painter (1834–1886)

Michele Lenzi (July 7, 1834 – June 26, 1886) was an Italian painter.

He was born and resided in Bagnoli Irpino in the province of Avellino. He painted in oil, water color, and pastels, and was prolific in exhibitions. He is one of the painters to emerge as disciple of members of the School of Posillipo. Many of his works are in exhibit at the town art gallery of his birthplace, where he served as mayor. He was a close friend of the painter Achille Martelli.

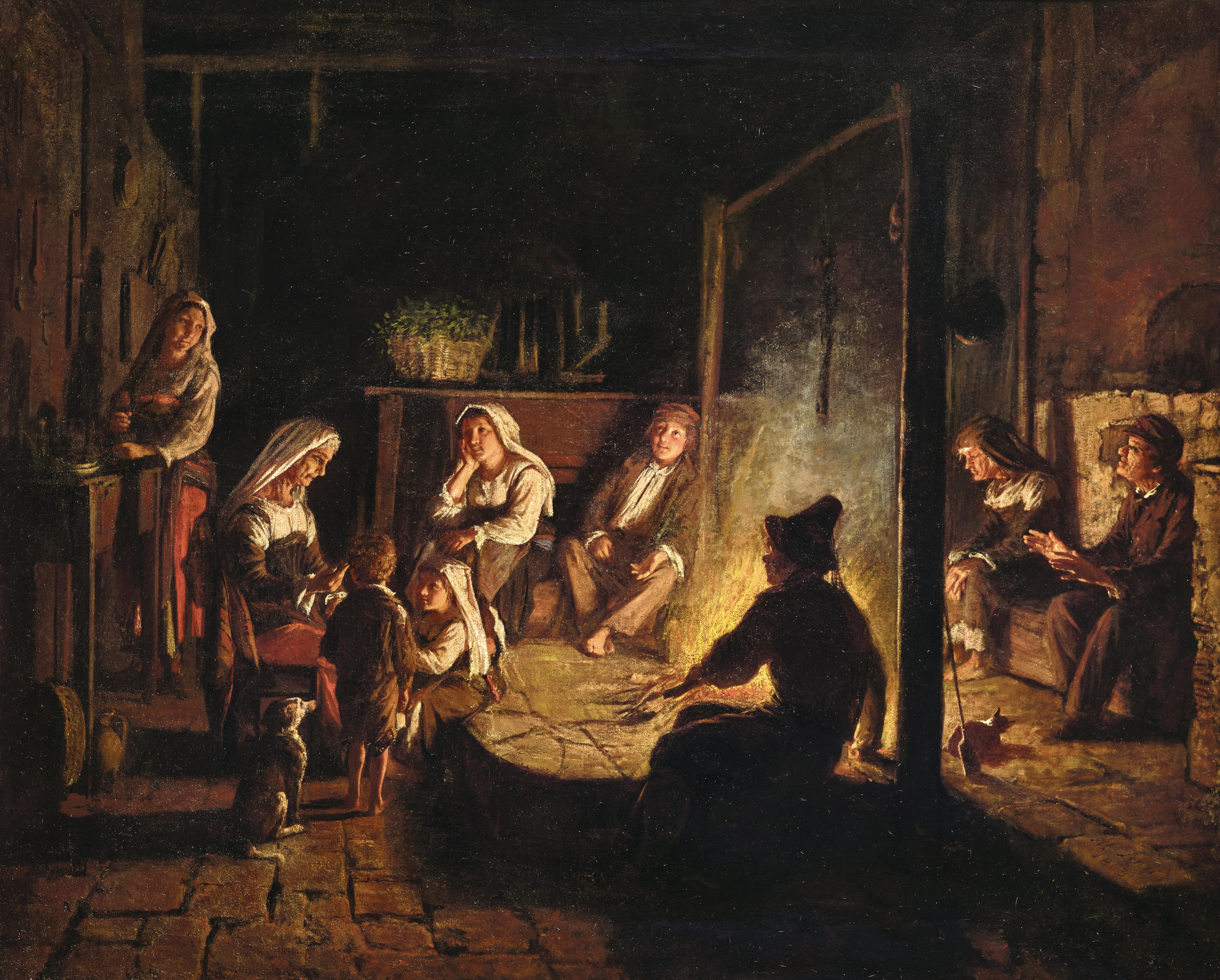
Grandmother's Tales, 1863

In 1877 in Naples, he displayed La farfalla attorno al lume; Un ospizio sugli altipiani del Monte Saceno, and some painted majolica. At Turin, in 1880: Un ponte sul Cadore presso Bagnoli Irpino; Costume di Bagnoli; Costume di Calabria; and Effetto di luna. Among his other paintings are I rudimenti della calzetta; Costume della Terra di Iavoro; Animali; and Donne della Campania.
