= Naskar =

Naskar is an Indian surname.

Some notable personalities are:

- Hem Chandra Naskar, Former Irrigation Minister of West Bengal and Mayor of Kolkata
- Anukul Chandra Naskar, Indian politician
- Subhas Naskar, Indian politician
- Jayanta Naskar, Indian politician
- Gobinda Chandra Naskar, Indian politician
- Purnendu Sekhar Naskar, Indian politician
