= Lenzi, Talesh =

Lenzi لنزي
- Village
- Location within Iran
- Coordinates: 38°12′27″N 48°46′58″E
- Country: Iran
- Province: Gilan
- County: Talesh
- Bakhsh: Haviq
- Rural District: Chubar

Population (2006)
  - Total: 157
- Time zone: UTC+3:30 (IRST)
  - Summer (DST): UTC+4:30 (IRDT)

Lenzi (Persian: لنزي, also Romanized as Lenzī) is a village in Chubar Rural District, Haviq District, Talesh County, Gilan Province, Iran. At the 2006 census, its population was 157, in 32 families.
