= Radha Brahmbhatt =

Indian beauty pageant contestant

Radha Brahmbhatt won the Miss India Britain 2008 beauty pageant title. She participated in the Femina Miss India pageant in 2008 and later represented India in the Miss International 2008 contest.

== See also ==
- Parvathy Omanakuttan
- Simran Kaur Mundi
