= Barot (surname) =

Barot is a surname. Notable people with the surname include:

- Chandra Barot (1939–2025), Indian film director
- Dhiren Barot (born 1971), convicted terrorist in the United Kingdom
- Kamal Barot (born 1938), Indian female playback singer
- Miraj Barot (born 1988), Indian-born Ugandan business executive
- Ranjit Barot (born before 1995), Indian film score composer
- Jayantilal Barot (1942–2017), Member of the Parliament of India
- Navin Chandra Barot (1924–2002), member of the Gujarat Legislative Assembly
