= Lahiri =

- Pronunciation: লাহিড়ী

Origin
- Language: Bengali
- Region of origin: Barendra, Bengal

Lahiri (Bengali: লাহিড়ী) is a Bengali Brahmin surname belonging primarily to the Barendra sect of Kulin Brahmins found both in West Bengal and Bangladesh. The surname belongs to the Samvedic Sandilya Gotra of the Brahmin caste. This name originates from the name of the village Laheria in the Barendra region, where the Kanyakubja Brahmins settled during the Sena dynasty when Ballal Sen introduced Kulinism.

== Notable people with this surname ==
- Bappi Lahiri
- Shyama Charan Lahiri (Lahiri Mahasaya)
- Ramtanu Lahiri
- Jhumpa Lahiri
- Shanu Lahiri
- Dulal Lahiri
- Rajendra Lahiri
- Prabhas Chandra Lahiri
- Anirban Lahiri
- Anya Lahiri
