= Barot (caste) =

Indian caste

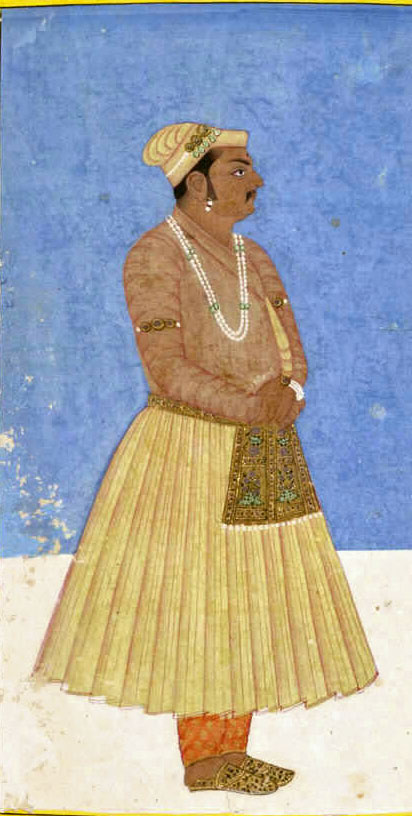
Birbal whose real name is Maheshdas Brahmbhatt and was also known by the name Raja Shivadas Brahmbhatt Barot. A prominent Historical figure in the history of India from a notable social group - the Brahmbhatt clan.

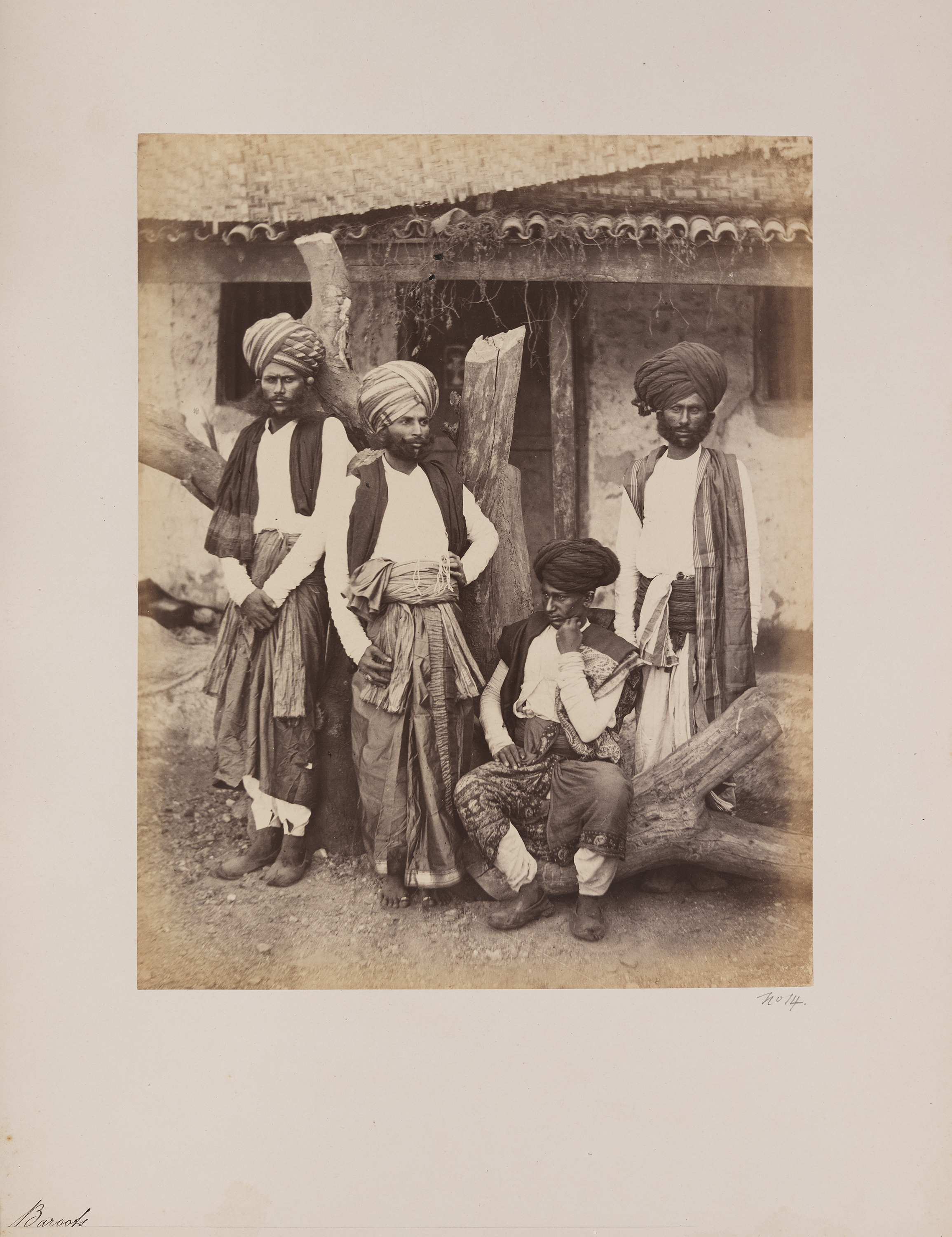
Vahivancha Barots (Western India, c. 1855–1862). For disambiguation, Brahmbhatt Barots, who are different community working as courtiers and poets, are not shown in the image.

Barot is an Indian surname native to Gujarat and Rajasthan. The Barot honorific title is used by, Brahmbhatts, Vahivancha/Vahi Bhaats/geneologists, and Turi caste people also started to appropriate the surname "Barot".

== Origin ==
- Brahmbhatt is a branch of Brahmins primarily who used to work as Court Poets(Raj Kavi/Royal Bard), Ministers(Mantri), Heralds, Administrators, Priests, Policy Makers, Feudal Lords and also as Independent rulers in various parts of Hindustan.
- Brahmbhatt caste also referred as Bhatt(not to confuse with Bhaat) are descendants of Kavi Rishi the son of Lord Brahma is more of a brahminical caste following vegetarianism strictly, no widow remarriages, and no liquor. They also wear the sacred thread. Brahmbhatts of Gujarat and Kathiawar did not dine with other division(Bhats), Vaniyas and Kanbis. Brahmabhatts do not dine with Charans and did not touch utensils used by bhats. Notable names in Brahmbhatts in history are Chand Bardai and Birbal. (Birbal (originally named Shivdas Brahmbhatt as per Bhagvatsinhji's Encyclopedia) was a Mutsaddi (official) in Emperor Akbar’s court. He was highly intelligent and became well-known for his knowledge of Hindi, Persian, and Sanskrit. Known for his quick wit, he enjoyed the emperor’s favour. He was also referred to as Lava. Apart from being a poet, Birbal was a skilled military commander. For securing victory for his lord, he was granted the Jagir of Nagarkot. Birbal was adept at explaining the principles of Hinduism effectively, gaining the emperor’s trust and helping him administer justice wisely. He himself belonged to the Brahmbhatt (Barot) community. Among Hindu officials, he was known for his humour. He had a strong passion for composing Hindi poetry, and Akbar honoured him with the title of Kaviraj. In 1574 CE, he was granted the Jagir of Nagarkot, officially recognising him as a ruler.)
- Originally the Surname/Honorific Title of Barot was for the people belonging to Brahmin Origin i.e. Brahmbhatts, Nagars, Rajgor.
- The Vahivancha, also known as Chandisa, Jaga, Maga, Badva in Rajputana, traditionally used the surname of their patrons. For example, a Vahivancha serving the Rathores would adopt the surname Rathore, while one attached to the Parmar/Pramar clan would use Parmar. In ancient times, their services were sought by socially prominent clans. Even Brahmbhatts and certain well-established Brahmin communities engaged the services of these genealogist Vahivanchas. Over time, this led to the Barot title, originally associated with Brahmbhatts, being adopted and appropriated by the Vahivanchas.
- The caste known as "Vahivancha Barots": The word Vahivancha (IAST: "Vahīvancā) literally means "one who reads a vahi" (vahi means a book of genealogy, a ledger or a book in general). The Vahivanchas traditionally maintained genealogies, told stories and recited bardic poetry. According to one theory, the caste of Vahivancha Barots developed from the Bhāts. Widespread tradition states that the Vahivanchas came to Gujarat from Rajputana during the Solanki period (942-1245 CE). The oldest extant Vahivancha book dates back to 1740 CE, written in Old Gujarati language. The term "Barot" was originally used as an honorific title for both Vahivanchas-Bhats and Brahmbhatts, but was gradually adopted as a caste appellation by the Vahivancha caste people. Bahi Bhat/Vahivanchas practice Nata pratha according to historic records. The Vahivancas/Vahivanchas have imitated Rajputs in many ways. Like Rajputs, the Vahivanchas also consider themselves Ksatriyas, as distinct from Brahmbhatts. The Vahi Bhaats/Vahivanchas traditionally worked as genealogists and mythographers. Whereas Brahmbhatts are distinct from "other" Barots or Bhats.
- The Turi are a Scheduled Caste in India known for traditional bamboo craftsmanship and agricultural labour, often facing social discrimination and economic hardship. Limited literacy and declining demand for their handmade goods have worsened their challenges, despite affirmative action measures.

== See also ==
- Bhats
- Rai Bhat
