= Brazilian Rubber Technology Association =

The Brazilian Rubber Technology Association (abbreviated ABTB in Portuguese) is a Brazilian non-profit entity dedicated to the development and spread of rubber technology in Brazil. ABTB has an extensive library about rubber and its processing, which is accessible through the group's website.

ABTB was founded on May 26, 1975 with the objective to congregate all rubber and rubber-like activities on Brazil.

ABTB holds a congress every two years.

ABTB is member of Rubber Division of the American Chemical Society as Brazil Rubber Group, and is member of IRCO.

ABTB organized the IRC2011 in São Paulo, Brazil, this was the first IRC conference on Latin America.
