= Inamdar (surname) =

Inamdar is an Indian surname derived from the feudal title Inamdar, which was held by feudal landholders. The surname is found primarily in the states of Maharashtra, Karnataka and Gujarat and occurs amongst Hindus, Muslims, and various castes. Major Inamdar families are from the district of Mumbai, Solapur, Olpad, Satara, Gadag, Belgaum, Ahmednagar, Bijapur, Pune, Kolhapur, Beed.

== List of people with the name ==
- Lakshmanrao Inamdar
- Nagnath S. Inamdar
- P. A. Inamdar
- Shafi Inamdar
- Maneesha S. Inamdar
- Rucha Inamdar

== See also ==
- Sardar
- Mankari
- Zamindar
- Jagirdar
