= Oliveto Citra =

- Comune
- Comune di Oliveto Citra
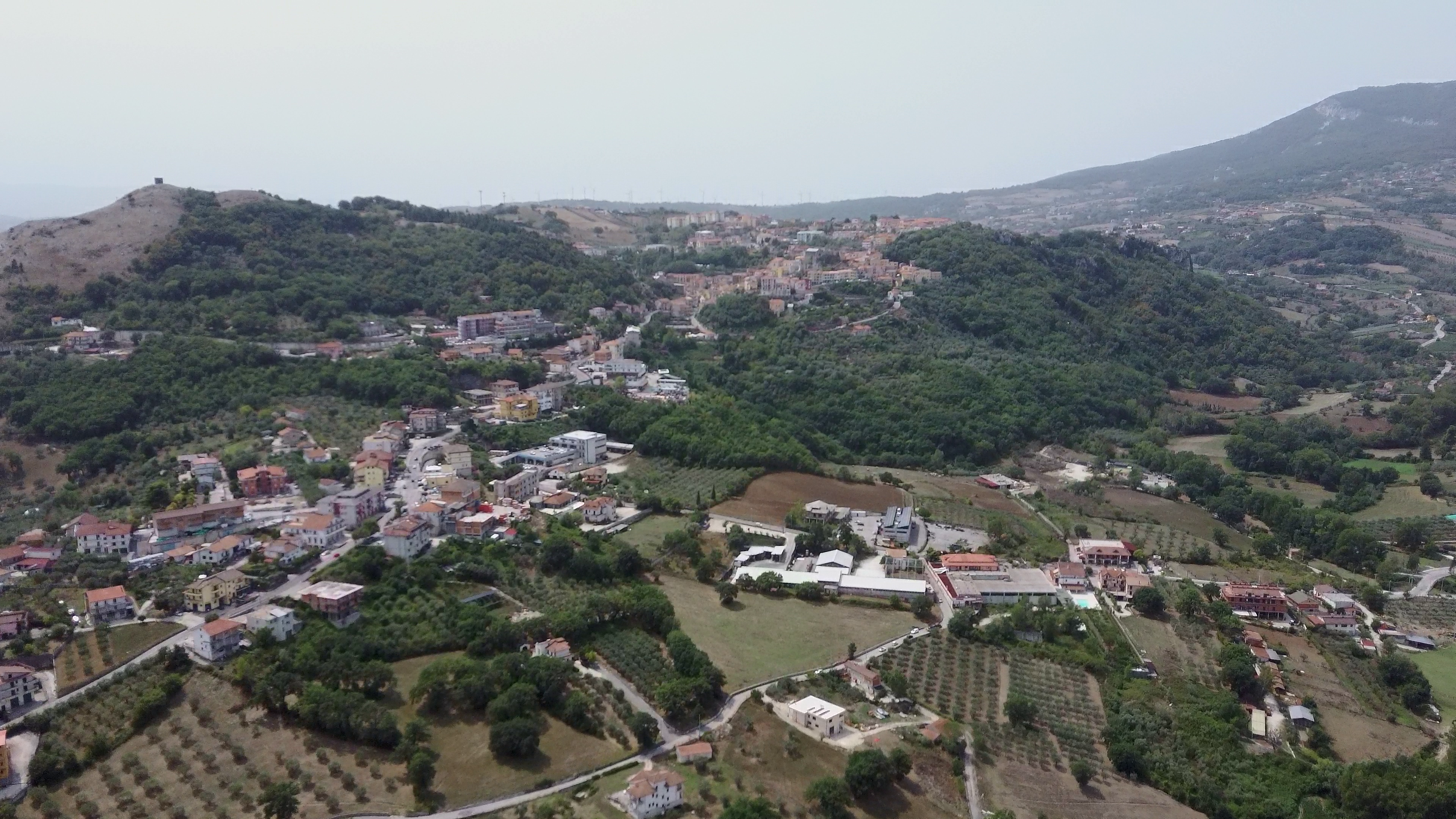

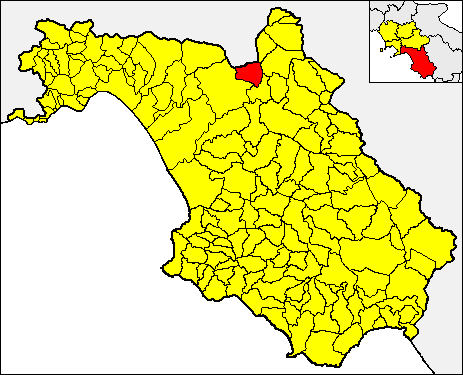
- Comune location in the Province of Salerno

- Location within Italy Location within Campania
- Coordinates: 40°41′N 15°14′E
- Country: Italy
- Region: Campania
- Province: Salerno (SA)
- Frazioni: Casale, Dogana, Ponte Oliveto, Serroni

Area
  - Total: 31.62 km^{2} (12.21 sq mi)
- Elevation: 300 m (980 ft)

Population (1 April 2016)
  - Total: 3,801
  - Density: 120.2/km^{2} (311.3/sq mi)
- Demonym: Olivetani
- Time zone: UTC+1 (CET)
  - Summer (DST): UTC+2 (CEST)
- Postal code: 84020
- Dialing code: 0828
- Patron saint: San Macario Abate
- Saint day: 24 May
- Website: Official website

Oliveto Citra (Campanian: 'U Luit) is a town and comune in the province of Salerno in the Campania region of south-western Italy. It is located 55 kilometres (34 mi) by road northeast of Salerno. As of 2016, the comune had 3,802 inhabitants and covered an area of 31.62 square kilometres (12.21 sq mi).

== History ==
Archaeological discoveries in the vicinity have unearthed artifacts dating from as early as the 6th century B.C. The castle of Oliveto was first mentioned in documents in 1114, when Santa Maria de Foris, in the hamlet of Oliveto, was given to the archbishop of Conza by Count Quaimario Giffoni. Later that century, the manor was owned by the French Norman, William of toille (Tuilla). Until the Risorgimento, the castle was the seat of feudal lords and local barons.

On May 24, 1985 it is alleged that the Blessed Virgin Mary made an appearance in Oliveto Citra, holding a baby. Over 100 villagers signed statements confessing to seeing the apparition. According to cultural anthropologist Paolo Apolito, these visitations are controversial and have not yet been approved by the Roman Catholic Church.

== Geography ==
Oliveto Citra is situated 55 kilometres (34 mi) by road northeast of Salerno. The comune includes the following frazioni: Casale (pop. 92), Dogana (pop. 40), Ponte Oliveto (pop. 8) and Serroni (pop. 85). The principal road is the Strada statale 691 Fondo Valle Sele (SS 691). That and the Sele River pass the town on the eastern side. There is a natural area in the comune known as "Piano di Canale". The large, heavily forested Parco Regionale Dei Monti Picentini is in the northwest. An industrial estate, Zona Industriale Staglioni, is located to the north of the town, near the village of Dogana.

== Landmarks ==
The commune contains an 11th–12th-century castle, Castello Guerritore. An old stone pathway leads up to the castle from the Piazza Garibaldi square. The main churches are Chiesa di Santa Maria della Misericordia (1775), Chiesa Madonna delle Grazie (1497) and Santuario Madonna della Consolazione (17th century).

=== Religion ===
The majority of the population are Catholic. The municipality belongs to the Roman Catholic Archdiocese of Salerno-Campagna-Acerno, within the Santa Maria della Misericordia parish. There is also a Protestant community; the CCEVAS Pentecostal Church has been present since about 1950.

== Notable people ==
- Vincenzo Indelli (1908–2000), politician
- Frank Rio (1895–1935), member of Al Capone's Chicago-based criminal organization
