= Lanzi =

Lanzi is an Italian surname. Notable people with the surname include:

- Asia Lanzi (born 2002), Italian skateboarder
- Enrico Lanzi (1953–2025), Italian footballer and manager
- François Lanzi (1916–1988), French artist
- Gaetano Lanzi (1905–1980), Italian boxer
- Lorenzo Lanzi (born 1981), Italian motorcycle racer
- Luigi Lanzi (1732–1810), Italian art historian and archaeologist
- Mario Lanzi (1914–1980), Italian middle-distance runner
