= Giovanni Battista Zaist =

Italian painter

- Born: June 14, 1700; Cremona
- Died: September 29, 1757 (aged 57)

Giovanni Battista Zaist (Cremona, June 14, 1700 – September 29, 1757) was an Italian painter and art historian.

== Biography ==
He was a pupil of Giuseppe Natali. Zaist painted for the church of Santi Egidio ed Omobono and the oratory of San Girolamo. In 1736, Bishop Alessandro Litta used his design to build the convents and churches for the Malmaritate and Penitenti. He is likely best known for his biography of Cremonese painters, which was published posthumously.
