= Saint Gerard Majella (disambiguation) =

Saint Gerard Majella can refer to

== People ==
- Gerard Majella (1726–1755), an Italian lay brother of the Redemptorists, who is honored as a saint by the Catholic Church

== Places ==
- Saint-Gérard-Majella, Quebec, a parish municipality in the Pierre-De Saurel Regional County Municipality of Quebec
- Saint-Gérard-Majella, Lanaudière, Quebec, a former municipality in Lanaudière, Quebec, now part of L'Assomption
- Gerardus Majella, Suriname, a Dutch leper colony in Suriname

== Churches ==
- St. Gerard Church, The Valley, Anguilla
- St Gerard Majella's Church, Carlingford, New South Wales, Australia
- Basilica of St. Gerard Majella, Curvelo, Minas Gerais, Brazil
- Sanctuary of San Gerardo Maiella, Materdomini, Campania, Italy
- San Gerardo Maiella, Rome, Italy
- Gerardus Majellakerk (Tilburg), the Netherlands
- Gerardus Majellakerk, Utrecht, the Netherlands
- St Gerard's Church and Monastery, Wellington, New Zealand

== Events ==
- St. Gerard Majella Annual Novena held each October at St. Joseph's Redemptorist Church, Dundalk, Ireland
