= Caposele =

- Comune
- Comune di Caposele
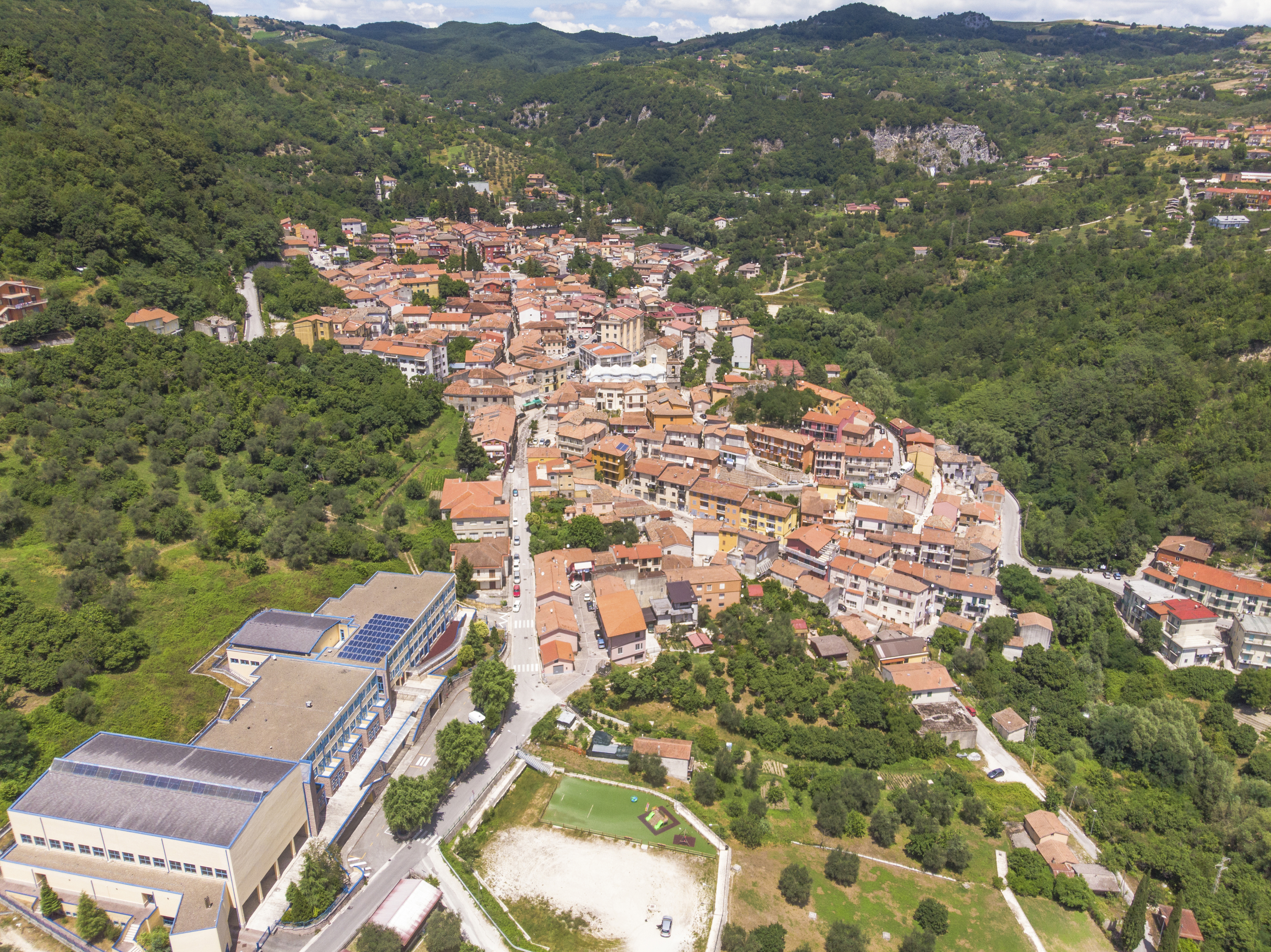

- Coat of arms

- Location within Italy Location within Campania
- Coordinates: 40°48′53″N 15°13′24″E
- Country: Italy
- Region: Campania
- Province: Avellino (AV)
- Frazioni: Buoninventre, Materdomini

Government
  - Mayor: Lorenzo Melillo

Area
  - Total: 41.28 km^{2} (15.94 sq mi)
- Elevation: 415 m (1,362 ft)

Population (31 May 2015)
  - Total: 3,458
  - Density: 83.77/km^{2} (217.0/sq mi)
- Demonym: Caposelesi
- Time zone: UTC+1 (CET)
  - Summer (DST): UTC+2 (CEST)
- Postal code: 83040
- Dialing code: 0827
- Patron saint: Saint Lawrence; Gerard Majella in Materdomini
- Saint day: 10 August and 16 October
- Website: Official website

Caposele (Irpino: Capussela) is a town and comune in the province of Avellino, Campania, Italy. The town was seriously damaged by the 1980 Irpinia earthquake.

It borders with Calabritto, Bagnoli Irpino, Lioni, Teora, Conza della Campania, Castelnuovo di Conza, Laviano and Valva.

The town, elevation 415m, is reputedly the origin of the Silarius river.

The civil parishes (frazioni) are Buoninventre and Materdomini. Materdomini was the death place of Gerard Majella; the Basilica of San Gerardo Maiella is dedicated there to him.
