= Santa Maria Materdomini =

Santa Maria Materdomini may refer to:

- Basilica of Santa Maria Mater Domini, church and monastery complex in Materdomini, Campania, Italy
- Santa Maria Materdomini, Naples, church in Naples, Italy
- Santa Maria Mater Domini, church in Venice, Italy

== See also ==
- Materdomini (disambiguation)
