= Materdomini, Campania =

Materdomini
- Frazione
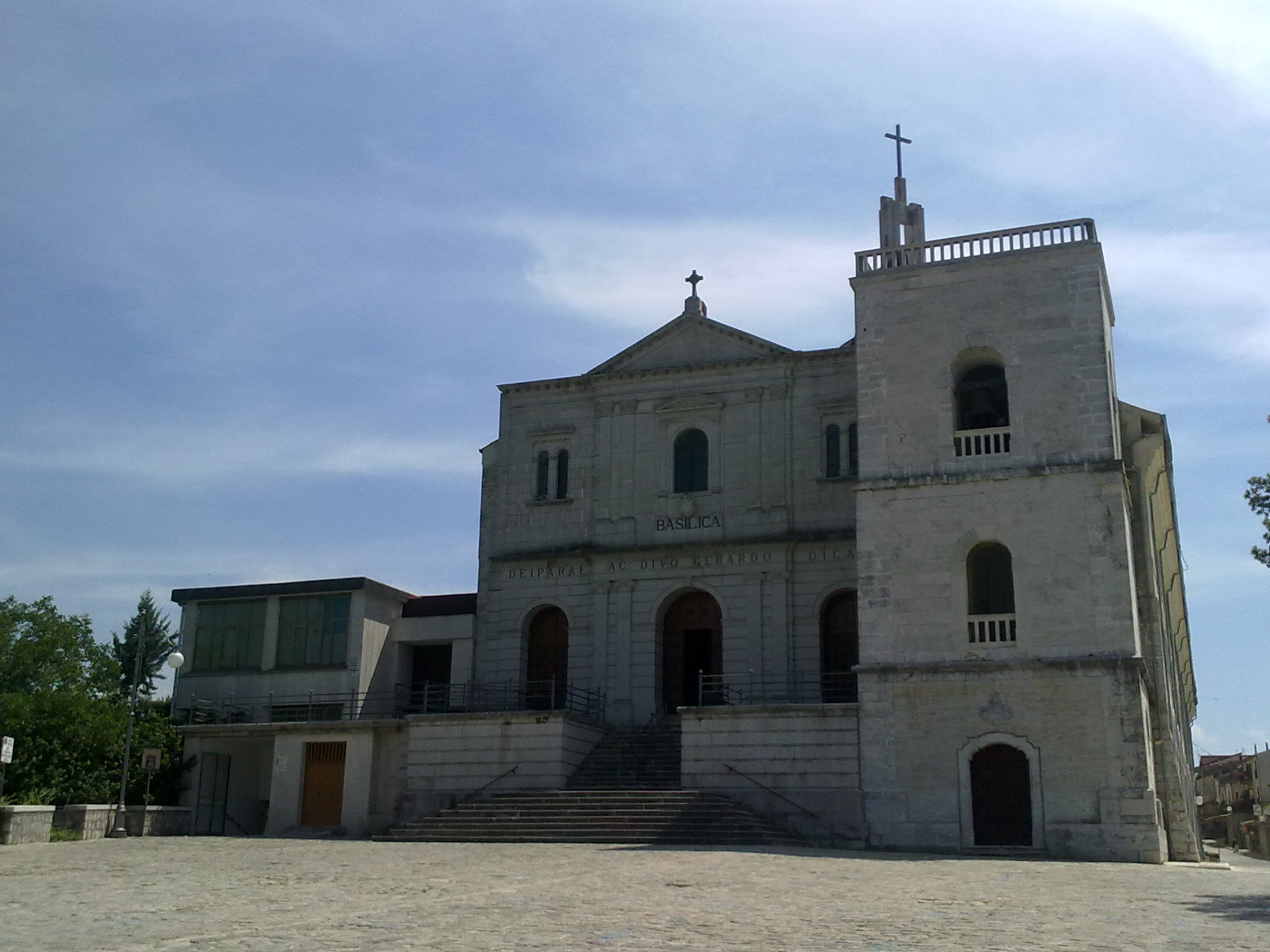
- The Basilica of San Gerardo Maiella

- Location of Materdomini in Italy
- Coordinates: 40°44′43″N 15°14′8″E
- Country: Italy
- Region: Campania
- Province: Avellino (AV)
- Comune: Caposele
- Elevation: 525 m (1,722 ft)

Population (2010)
  - Total: 735
- Demonym: Materdominesi
- Time zone: UTC+1 (CET)
  - Summer (DST): UTC+2 (CEST)
- Postal code: 83040
- Dialing code: 0827
- Patron saint: Gerard Majella
- Saint day: 8 September, 16 October

Materdomini is an Italian hamlet (frazione) situated in the municipality of Caposele, Province of Avellino, Campania. As of 2009 its population was 735.

== History ==
Materdomini's name, a Latin word meaning Mother of God, derives from an ancient chapel dedicated to Santa Maria Materdomini, first mentioned in 1500. On October 16, 1755, Gerard Majella (originally of Muro Lucano) died in this chapel and was buried there. He was canonized in 1904. Mainly for this reason, during the first half of the 20th century, it grew into a village in the neighborhood of the Basilica of San Gerardo Maiella, one of the most important and respected Catholic sanctuaries of Campania and the surrounding areas.

== Geography ==
The town is located in the valley where the spring of the Sele river (in Caposele) is located and close to the Picentini mountain range. It is two km from Caposele, five from Teora, seven from Lioni, nine from Laviano (in the Province of Salerno). The exit "Caposele" of the rapid road Lioni-Contursi serves Materdomini directly.

== Personalities ==
- Gerard Majella (1726-1755), Roman Catholic saint
