= Materdomini =

Materdomini, a Latin word meaning Mother of God, may refer to 2 Italian hamlets (frazioni) located in Campania region:

- Materdomini, in the municipality of Caposele (AV)
- Materdomini, in the municipality of Nocera Superiore (SA)
