= San Gerardo Maiella, Rome =

St. Gerard Majella
- San Gerardo Maiella (in Italian); Sancti Gerardii Maiella (in Latin)
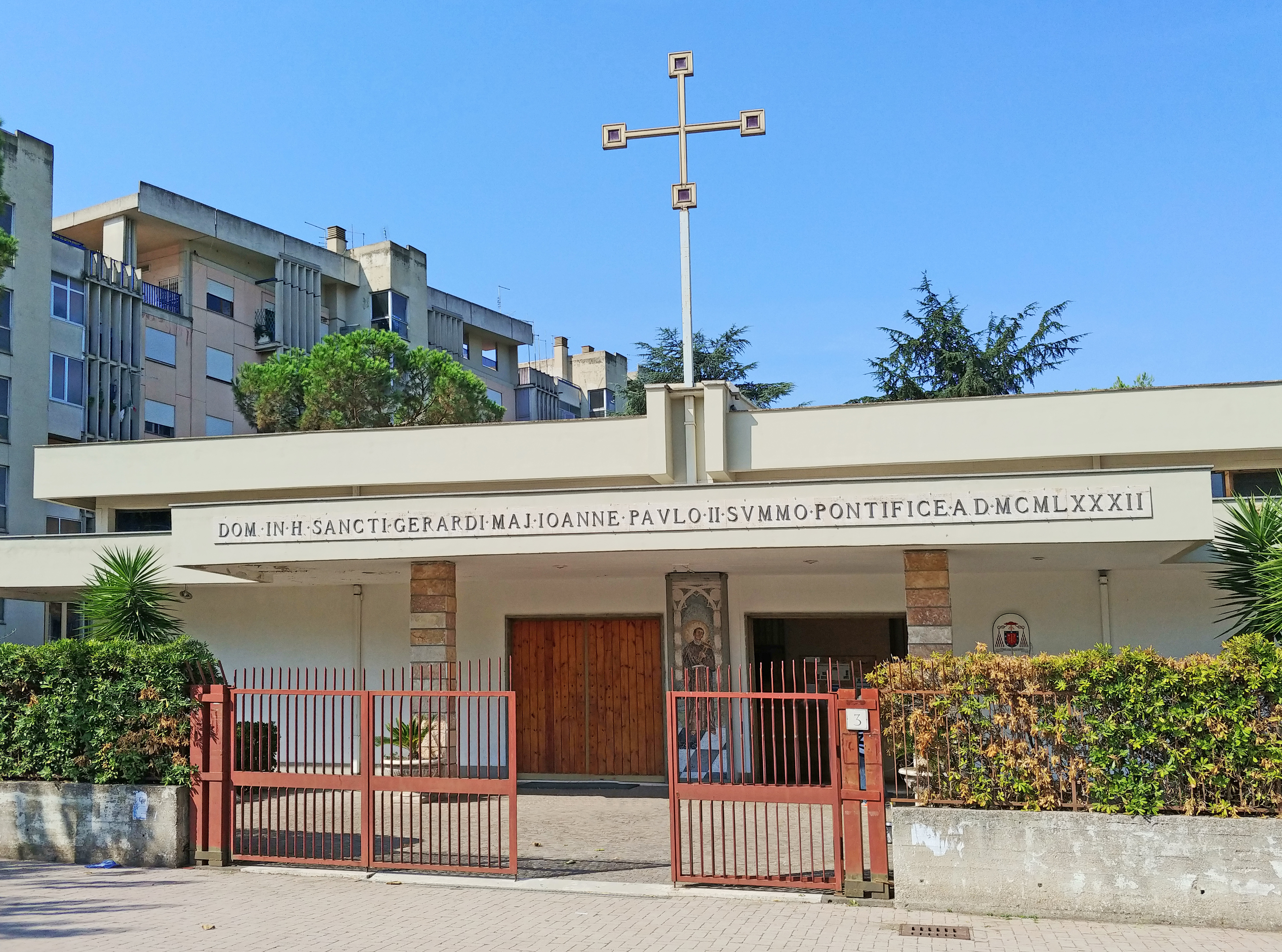
- Exterior
- Click on the map for a fullscreen view
- 41°52′52″N 12°33′22″E
- Location: Via di San Sebastianello, Campo Marzio, Rome
- Country: Italy
- Denomination: Roman Catholic
- Tradition: Roman Rite

History
- Status: Titular church
- Dedication: Gerard Majella
- Consecrated: 1982

Architecture
- Architect: Aldo Aloysi
- Architectural type: Church
- Groundbreaking: 1980
- Completed: 1981

Administration
- District: Lazio
- Province: Rome

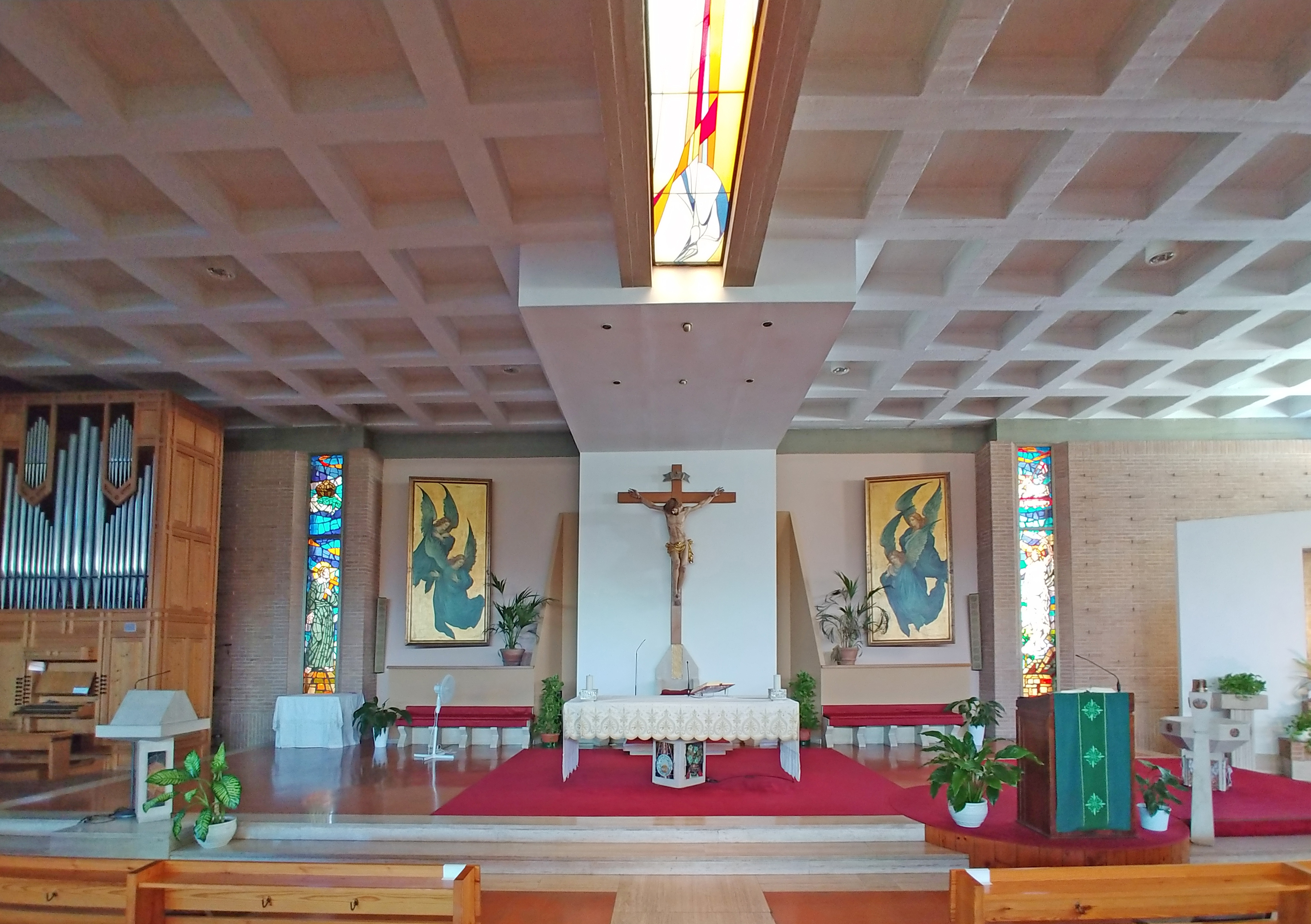
Altar

The church of St. Gerard Majella is a church of Rome in Prenestino-Labicano district, in Via Romolo Balzani.

== History ==
It was built between 1980 and 1981 by the architect Aldo Aloysi, and was consecrated 25 March 1982 by Cardinal Ugo Poletti.

The church is home parish, established 20 April 1978 by Cardinal Ugo Poletti Vicar with the decree His Holiness. It is home to the cardinal's title of "St. Gerard Majella", instituted by Pope John Paul II 26 November 1994.

== List of Cardinal Protectors ==
- Kazimierz Świątek (24 November 1994 – 21 July 2011)
- Ruben Salazar Gomez (24 November 2012 – present)
