= Basilica of St. Gerard Majella =

Coordinates: 18.7483°S 44.4289°W

- Basílica de São Geraldo Magela
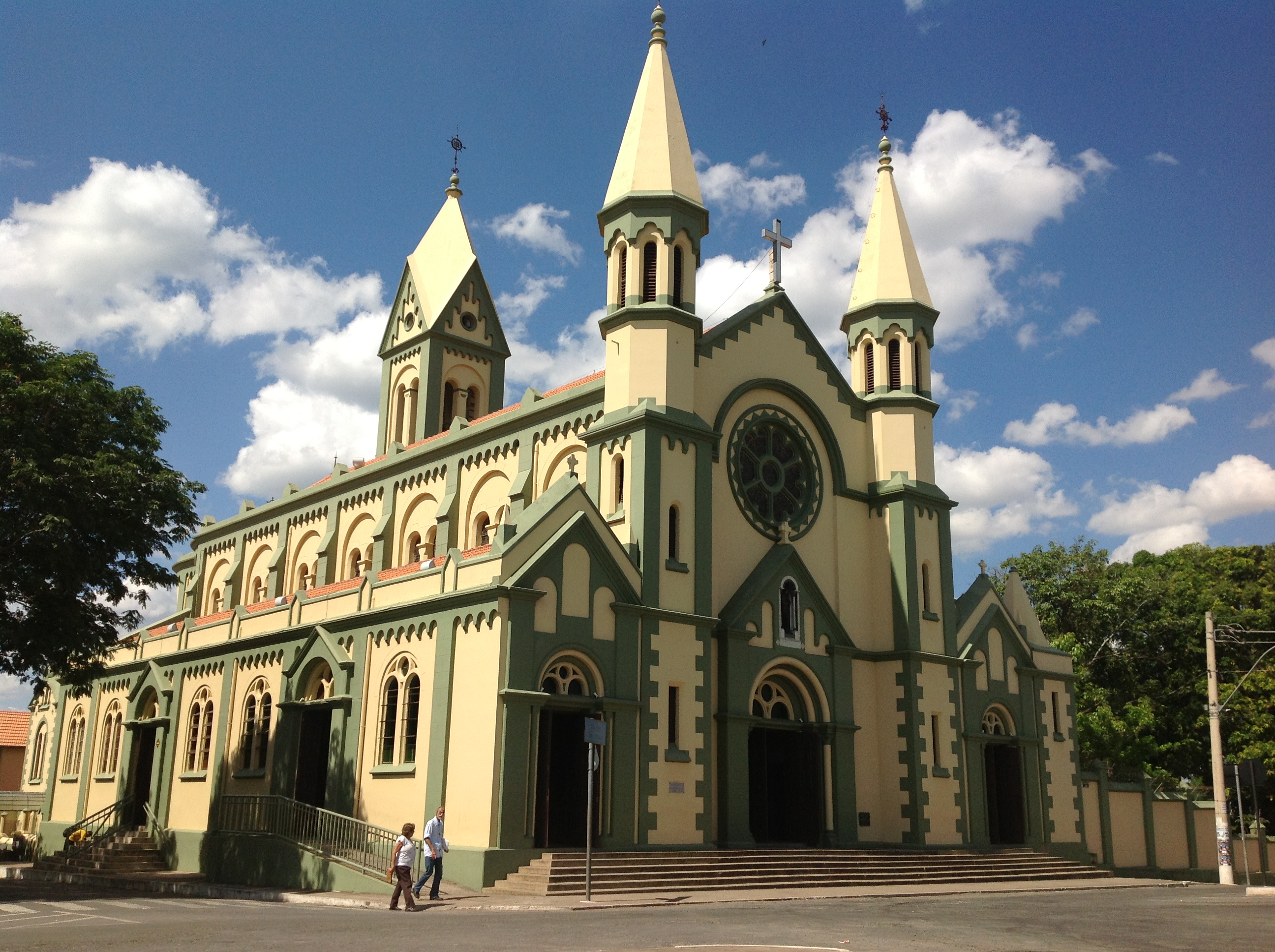
- Basilica of St. Gerard Majella
- Location: Curvelo
- Country: Brazil
- Denomination: Roman Catholic Church

The Basilica of St. Gerard Majella (Portuguese: Basílica de São Geraldo Magela) or the Basilica of Curvelo is a church of the Catholic Church, located in Curvelo, in the state of Minas Gerais, Brazil. It was built in 1906 by Dutch Redemptorist missionaries and is the only basilica in the world dedicated to this Redemptorist saint.

With the canonization of St. Gerard in 1904, the Redemptorist Fathers Tiago Boomaars, Joseph Goosens and Brother Philip Winter were dedicated to spreading the name of the new Catholic saint. On September 18, 1906, during their mission, the Redemptorists arrived at the Church of the Rosary in the city of Curvelo, where they established themselves and where later the construction of the Church of St Gerard would begin. On March 22, 1912, the construction of the church began and continued until 1919. During this period, Redemptorists received significant contributions from local people who assisted with labor and donations of products for sale and fundraising.

It was honoured with the status of basilica by a decision of Pope Paul VI on 30 April 1966.

== See also ==
- Roman Catholicism in Brazil
- St. Gerard Majella

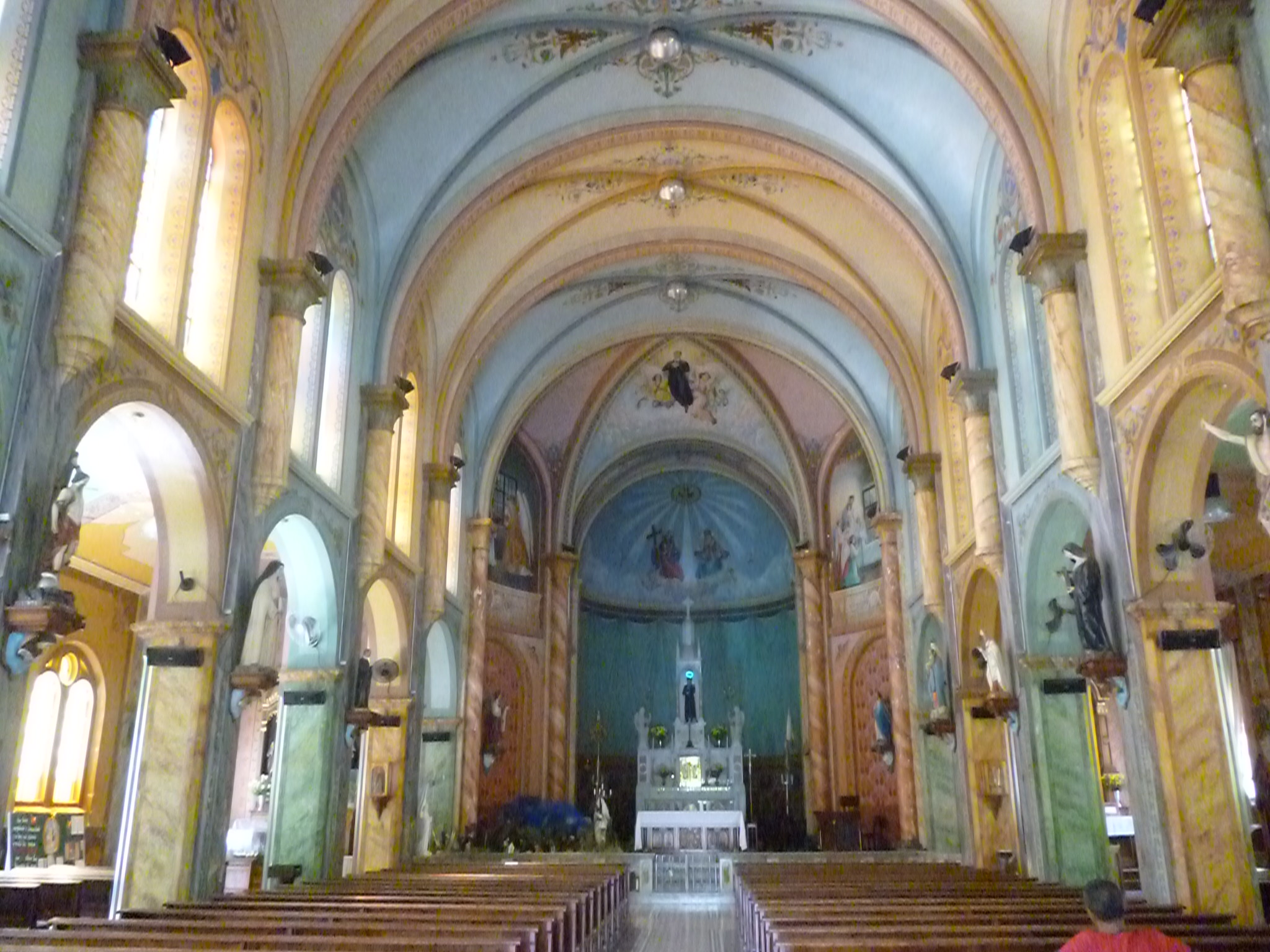
Internal view
