= Gerardus Majellakerk (Tilburg) =

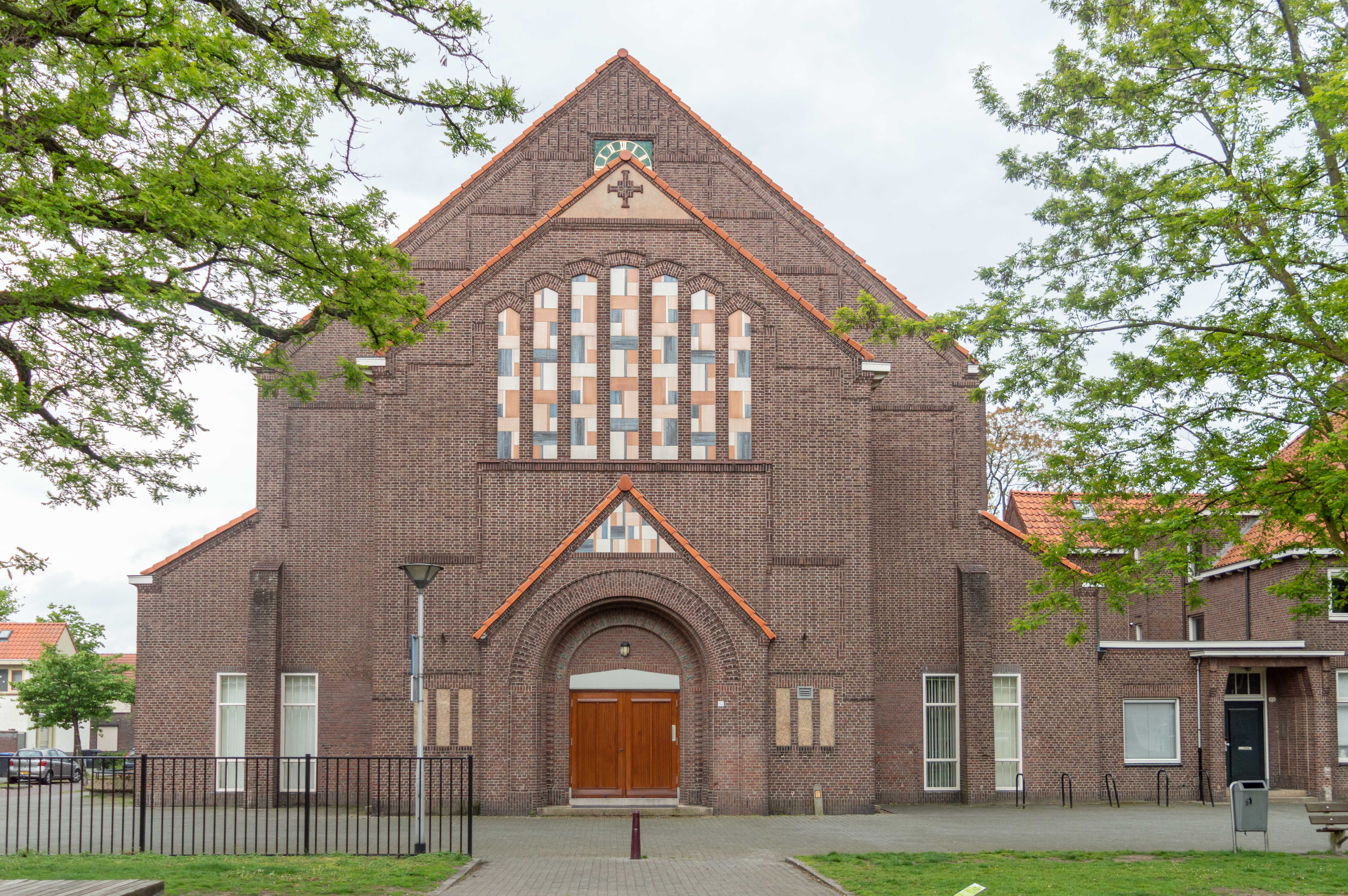
- Front facade of the church

- Location within North Brabant
- 51°32′57.4″N 5°04′45.9″E
- Location: Tilburg, North Brabant
- Country: Netherlands
- Denomination: Catholic Church
- Website: www.hlgm.nl

History
- Status: Church
- Founded: 3 May 1923
- Dedication: Gerard Majella
- Consecrated: 9 October 1933

Architecture
- Functional status: Active
- Architect(s): Joseph Cuypers; Pierre Cuypers jr.
- Architectural type: Basilica

Specifications
- Materials: Brick and wood

Administration
- Diocese: 's-Hertogenbosch
- Parish: Chronologically: St. Gerardus Majella (1921–2002); Lidwina Gerardus Majella (2002–2012); De Goede Herder (since 2012)

The Gerardus Majellakerk ("Gerard Majella Church"; also Sint-Gerardus Majellakerk or Trouwlaankerk) is a Roman Catholic church located in southern Tilburg along the Wassenaerlaan. It is dedicated to Gerard Majella, who became a saint in 1904, and has been part of the parish De Goede Herder ("The Good Shepherd") since its inception in 2012.

Designed by Joseph Cuypers and his son Pierre Cuypers jr., the church was built at the center of a new neighborhood and was completed in 1923. Originally, it was the parish church of its namesake parish. The consecration took place ten years later. The Gerardus Majellakerk came under the leadership of Capuchin priests in the early 1960s, and it became a place of pilgrimage for Padre Pio in 1988.

The brick-built Gerardus Majellakerk has a wooden roof covered with tiles. The church has a floor plan of a basilica with a large nave, flanked by side aisles, and a choir. Since a 1988 renovation, part of the nave is used as a meeting place and a chapel dedicated to Padre Pio. A clergy house, that was built simultaneously with the church, is located next to the church.

== History ==
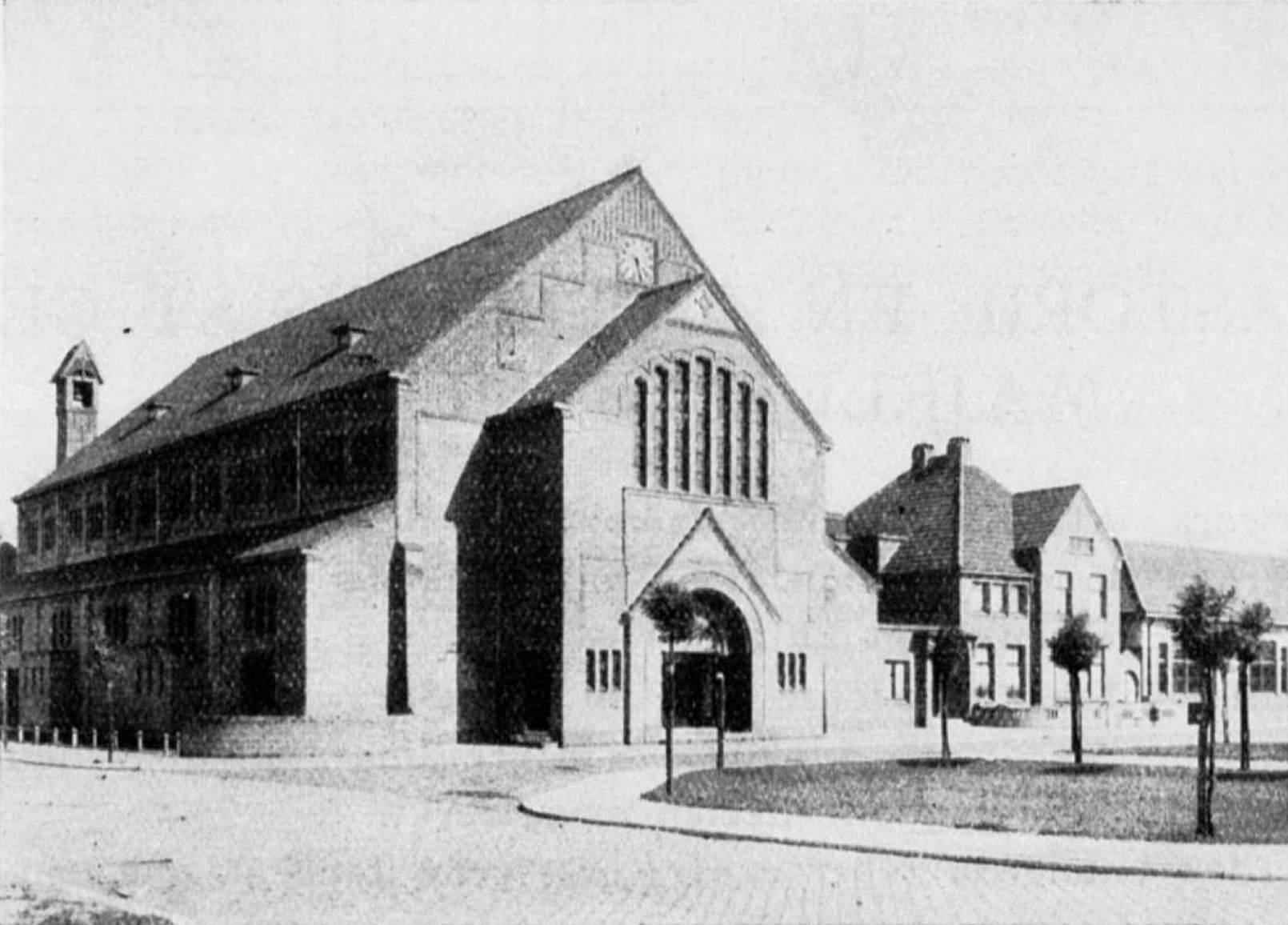
Church and clergy house shortly after completion in 1923

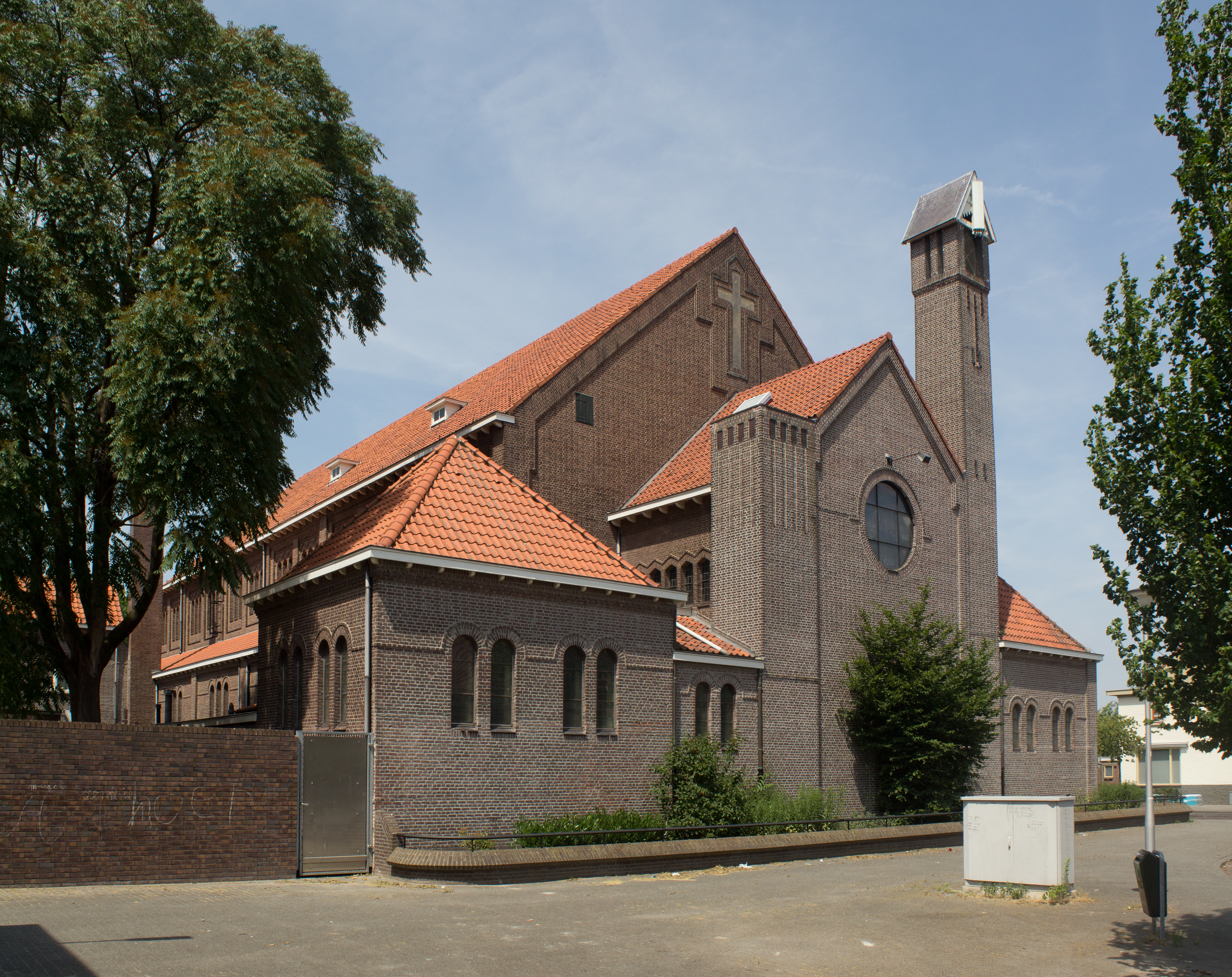
The back with the bell tower

=== Opening and consecration ===
The Gerardus Majellakerk was opened on 3 May 1923. It was built as a place of worship for a new working-class neighborhood, that was built simultaneously, in southern Tilburg with 400 homes. During planning, a central spot was left open intended for the church, a boys and girls school, and a community center. A street led to the entrance of the future church, which was to be situated along a square.

A new parish with the same name as the church was created with Piet Vroomans as parish priest. In 1920, Vroomans commissioned architect Joseph Cuypers to design the church. His eldest son, Pierre Cuypers jr., was involved in the design as well. The parish applied for a building permit in August 1921. During construction in 1922, Vroomans deceased and was succeeded by Priest Adrianus Verschure, who took over his role as client. Verschure brought in artist Piet Gerrits to be in charge of the furnishing and ornamentation of the church. The week before the church was opened, the two bells by Eijsbouts were consecrated before being put into place. The largest bell received the name "Petrus" after Priest Piet Vroomans.

The church was officially consecrated by Bishop Arnold Diepen in October 1933, over ten years after its opening. That date came shortly after murals of biblical scenes above the choir were completed by Piet Gerrits. Bishop Diepen arrived in the parish the day before, and festivities were held that day including a parade.

=== Subsequent years ===
The church was led by Capuchins starting in 1961. Over the next decades, the number of churchgoers was in decline. Consequently, it was decided to rent out the clergy house. After Ed van den Berge had become the parish's priest, the Gerardus Majellakerk was remodeled in 1988 according to a design by architect Theo Fijen; part of the nave near the entrance was separated from the rest of the nave and turned into a meeting place, an office, and a chapel dedicated to Padre Pio. That same year, the Gerardus Majellakerk became a place of pilgrimage for the Capuchin Padre Pio. Since 1988, a ceremony is held at the Pio chapel in the morning of every second Tuesday of the month. The chapel, located on the left side of the entrance, can seat about 70 people and features a painting of Padre Pio. In the late 1990s, the Meertens Institute identified the church as one of four places of pilgrimage in Tilburg.

In 2001, Priest Van den Berge retired and was not succeeded by another priest but by a deacon. The next year, the parish St. Gerardus Majella merged with Lidwina to become the parish "Lidwina Gerardus Majella". That parish was absorbed by the newly created parish "De Goede Herder" in 2012. Amid the closure of churches in Tilburg due to secularization, the Gerardus Majellakerk was also considered. However, the Diocese of 's-Hertogenbosch decided in 2013 that the church would remain open, as it argued a church was needed in the working-class neighborhoods.

== Architecture ==
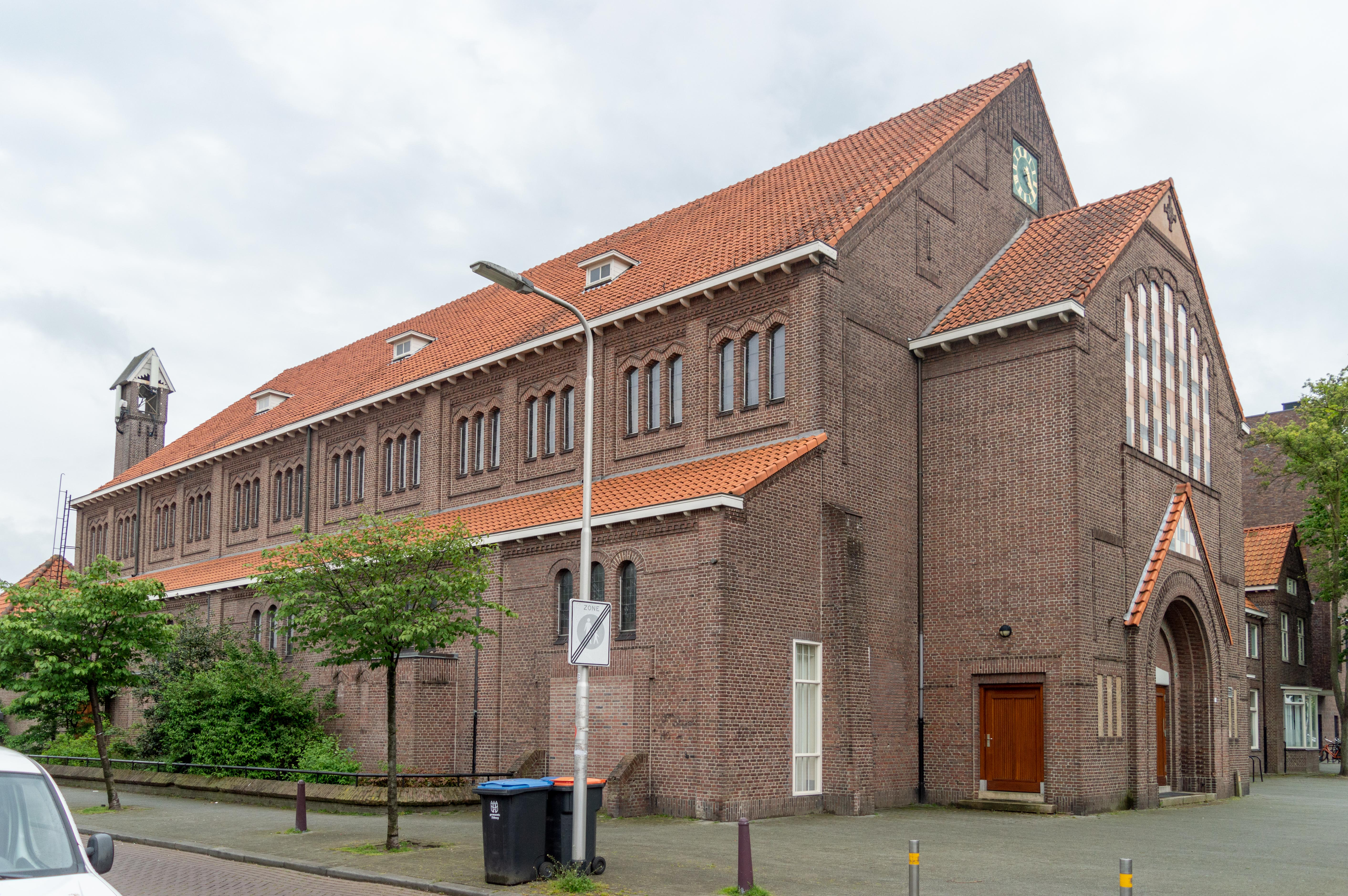
The side and front facades

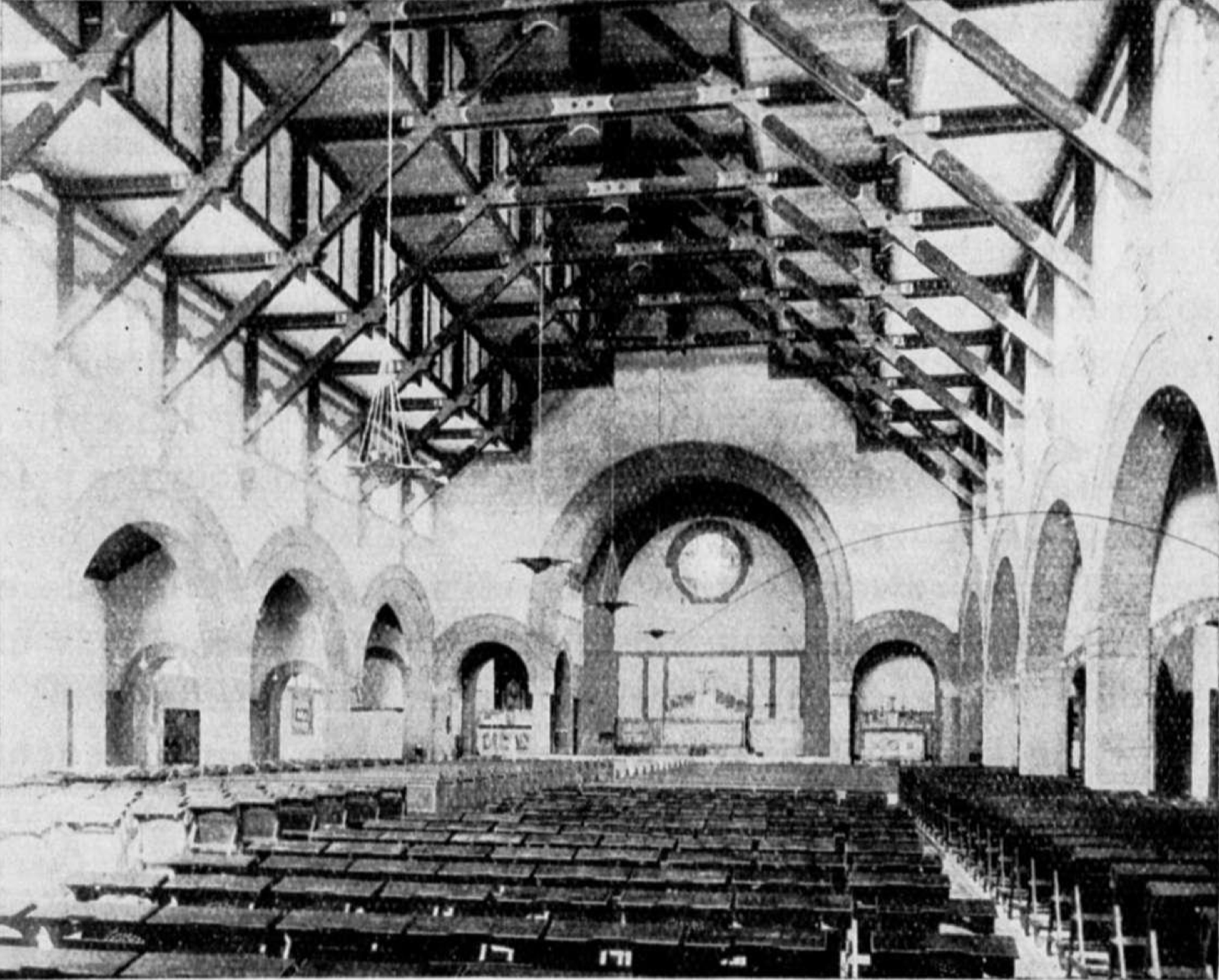
The interior shortly after its completion in 1923

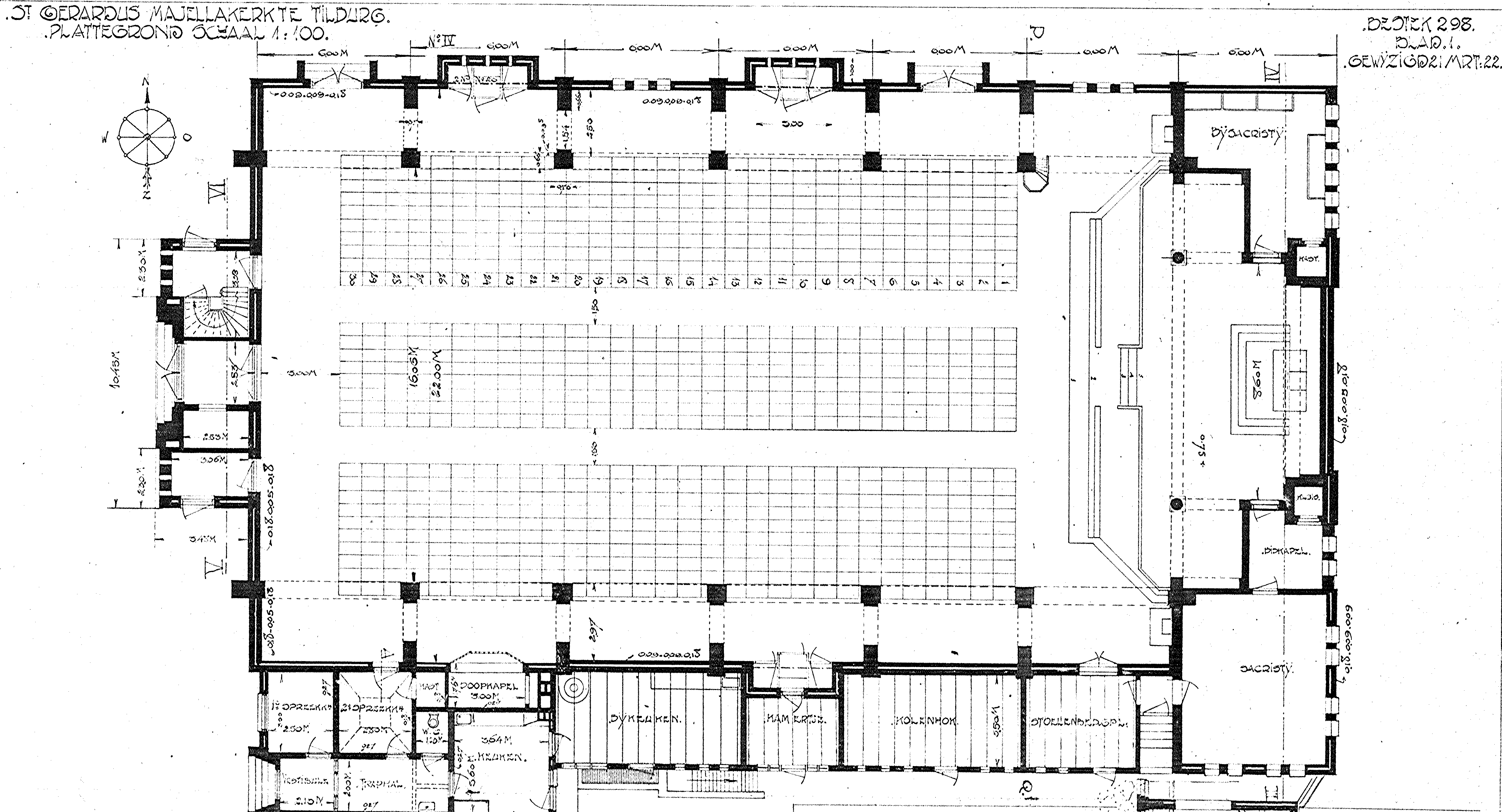
Floor plan of the original design

The Gerardus Majellakerk has a basilica floor plan, pointing eastward. The structure is made out of bricks and has a wooden roof. The front facade includes a clock. The largest part of the church is the 35.5 m (116 ft) long and 16 m (52 ft) wide nave, which has a gable roof with red roof tiles. It is flanked by two lower side aisles, that are separated from the nave in the interior by piers, that support arches. Small windows are located above those. The side aisles are relatively narrow to increase the church's seating capacity.

The interior of the nave is decorated with murals, and the ceiling has three different heights, connected by steps. Wooden rafters, that support the roof, are visible from the inside, and their joints are brightly colored. Part of the nave near the entrance has been modified in 1988 to be closed off from the rest of the space. This area now houses a meeting place, an office, and a chapel. There are seats for church choirs on the roof of this separated space.

The choir is separated from the nave by a large arch, that is supported by sandstone columns and flanked by two smaller arches. The choir has sacristies with hipped roofs on both sides, giving the church a close to rectangular footprint, and is covered by a vault. The back of the church features a Christian cross and a rose window, showing Infant Jesus held up by Mary. The rose window also includes the text "Ik zal vijandschap stellen tusschen U en de Vrouw", a bible quote from Genesis 3:15 that can be translated as "I will put hostility between you and the woman".

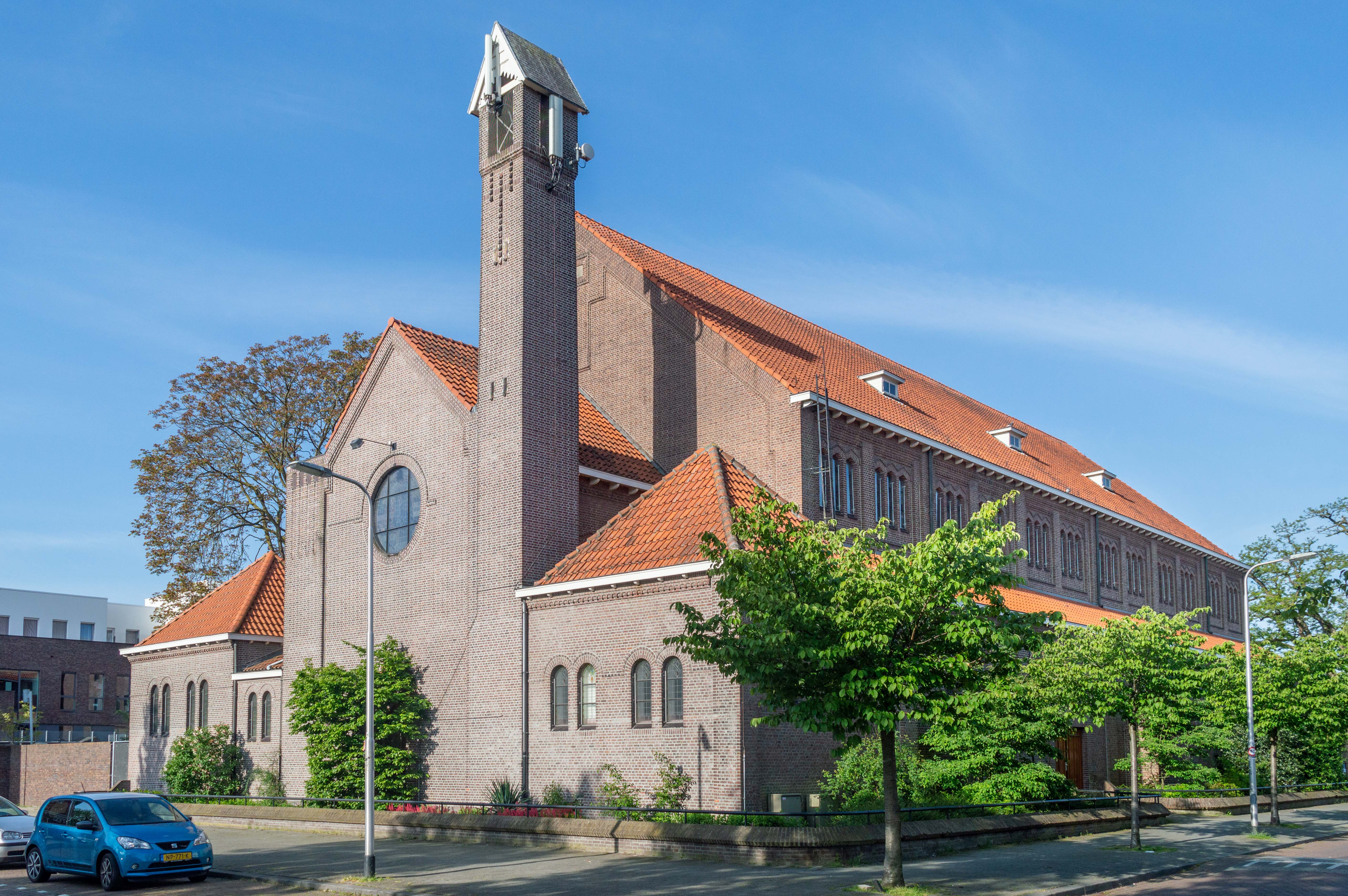
The back and side facades

Behind the church, there's a bell tower, that has two bells and is comparable in height to the roof of the nave. Architect Joseph Cuypers wrote in an article in the newspaper Nieuwe Tilburgsche Courant that he was unable to add a large church tower and suggested it could later be added on the north side. However, a church tower was never added.

The Gerardus Majellakerk is connected on the southwest side to a clergy house, that was constructed together with the church and was designed by the same architects. It has three floors.

=== Organs ===
The church contains two pipe organs, the main one being built in 1929 by Valckx & Van Kouteren. The organ uses a pneumatic action. A second organ with a mechanical action is located in the choir and was constructed by Elbertse Orgelmakers in 1973. That organ was originally located in the Margarita Maria Alacoquekerk in Tilburg, but was moved in 2016 to the Gerardus Majellakerk due to the closure of the former church.

The specification of the main organ is as follows:

Manuaal I
Prestant	16'
Prestant	8'
Roerfluit	8'
Salicionaal	8'
Octaaf	4'
Fluit octaviant	4'
Quint	2^{2}/_{3}'
Mixtuur	3 st.
Octaaf	2'
Trompet	8'

Manuaal II
Zacht gedekt	16'
Viool prestant	8'
Holpijp	8'
Concertfluit	4'
Nasard	2^{2}/_{3}'
Woudfluit	2'
Terts	1^{3}/_{5}'
Basson Hobo	8'

Pedaal
Violon	16'
Subbas	16'
Zachtgedekt	16'
Octaafbas	8'
Gedektbas	8'
Bazuin	16'

Couplers

- Manuaal I + Pedaal
- Manuaal I + Manuaal II
- Manuaal II + Pedaal
- Superoctaaf I + II
- Sub octaaf I + II
- Oct. koppel - Pedaal

Aids

- Generaal Crescendo
- Zwelwerk Manuaal II

The choir organ has the following specification:

Manuaal
Prestant	8'
Bourdon	8'
Quint	af. c' 2^{2}/_{3}'
Terts	af. c' 1^{3}/_{5}'
Prestant	2'
Roerfluit	4'

== Community ==
The church's newspaper is called "De Brug" ("The Bridge"), and it was formerly called "De Trouwring" ("The Wedding Ring"). The Gerardus Majellakerk has both a male and female choir. The former is called "Zangkoor Trouwlaan" and was re-established in 1943, while the latter is called "Sursum Corda" and was founded in 1963.

== Parish priests ==
The following priests have led the former St. Gerardus Majella parish:

- Petrus Vroomans (1921–1922)
- Adrianus Verschure (1922–1945)
- P. G. Hamers (1945–1946)
- C. H. M. Damen (1946)
- J. H. J. van den Heuvel (1946–1961)
- Chrysostomus de Bont (1961–1968)
- Fabius Beelen (1968–1969)
- Eymard Bouwmans (1969–1977)
- Jan Jansen (1977–1978)
- Dyonisius Schoenmakers (1978–1986)
- Ed van den Berge (1986–2001)

Van den Berge was the last parish priest, as he was succeeded by a deacon.
