= St. Gerard Majella Annual Novena =

The Solemn Novena to St. Gerard Majella is held over nine days at St. Joseph's Redemptorist Church, Dundalk, Ireland. It runs from 8 to 16 October.

== About St. Gerard Majella ==
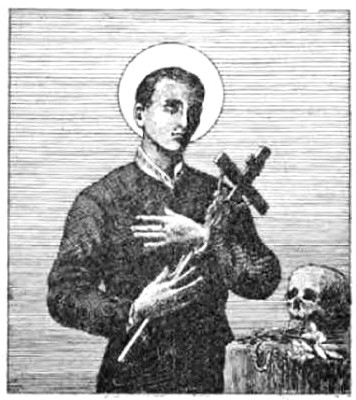
St. Gerard Majella

Gerardo Majella was born on 9 April 1726 in Muro Lucano, Italy, the son of a tailor who died when he was 12, leaving the family in poverty. Majella tried to join the Capuchin order, but his health prevented it. He was accepted as a Redemptorist lay brother serving his congregation as sacristan, gardener, ostiarius, infirmarian, and tailor.

Majella died on 16 October 1755, aged 29. He was beatified on 29 January 1893 by Pope Leo XIII, and was canonised on 11 December 1904 by Pope Pius X. The feast day of Saint Gerard Majella is 16 October.

He is a saint whose intercession is requested for children (and unborn children in particular), childbirth, mothers (and expectant mothers in particular), motherhood, falsely accused people, good confessions, lay brothers, and Muro Lucano, Italy.

Majella featured on an Italian 45-euro postage stamp in May 2005.

== The Redemptorists Annual Nine Day Novena ==
=== History ===
St. Joseph's Parish Church, a Redemptorist House in Dundalk, welcomes thousands of people from all over Ireland to the Annual Festival of Faith in Honour of St. Gerard Majella. It's the biggest festival of faith in Ireland with an average of 10,000 attending on a daily basis.

After Bro. Gerard's beatification in 1893, a triduum in his honour was preached in St. Joseph's by Fr. Hall, widely regarded as one of the greatest preachers of his day. The people of Dundalk took St. Gerard into their hearts after this sermon and continued to pay devotion to him on a regular basis. During the 1930s, Fr. John Murray, started the Annual Nine Day Novena to St. Gerard Majella, beginning on 8 October and finishing on his feast day, 16 October. Fr. Hugo Kerr erected a shrine to St. Gerard in the church in 1939. Today the novena continues to grow, with more than 10,000 people attending daily.

== Tradition ==
As St. Gerard Majella is patron of expecting mothers, the novena is also a yearly pilgrimage for many women and couples hoping to conceive. According to Novena Director Father Michael Cusack C.Ss.R., "This novena is always a time of solidarity which ignites the community spirit in the people of Dundalk and the surrounding counties, towns and villages."

The novena consists of 10 sessions a day, with the first session starting at 7am, running all day until the last session at 10pm, when the mass is conducted by candlelight. Prayers and petitions are offered up daily by members of the public and read out during each session.

== Highlights of the Novena ==
- Communal Celebration of the Sacrament of Reconciliation (usually on the 5th Day)
- Healing Mass with the Anointing of the Sick and the Elderly (held on the Saturday)
- The Blessing of Babies (2.30 pm service held on the Sunday)
- The Novena of All Nations (4.30pm on the Sunday)
- Taizé Mass – Candlelight Session. Nightly at 10.30pm
- Guest Speaker – lay people sharing their experience of life situations.

== Prayer to St. Gerard Majella ==
"Almighty and Eternal God, we thank you for the gift of St. Gerard and the example of his life. Because St. Gerard always had complete faith and trust in you, you blessed him with great powers of help and healing. Through him, you showed your loving concern for all those who suffered or were in need. You never failed to hear his prayer on their behalf. Today, through St. Gerard's powerful intercession, you continue to show your love for all those who place their trust in you. And so, Father, full of faith and confidence, and in thanksgiving for all the wonderful things you have done for us, we place ourselves before you today. Through the intercession of St. Gerard, hear our petitions, and if it is your holy will, grant them. Amen."

== Hymn to St. Gerard Majella ==
From Earth's Sorrow

From earth's sorrow, from life's tearland,
High above the clouds we gaze,
Where enthroned in starlike glory,
Reigns today the saint we praise.

Refrain

Saintly Gerard, Blessed Brother,
Thou whose heart did burn with love divine,
Friend of Jesus, child of Mary,
Make, O make our sinful hearts like thine.

Humble Gerard, lowly workman,
Patron of the hearts that toil,
Bless this bleak earth's myriad toilers,
Lift their thoughts above earth's soil.

To mark St. Gerard's Novena, the Novena prayers are also offered at Mass each day at the Dundalk Institute of Technology by the Chaplain's Office.
