= Sanctuary of San Gerardo Maiella =

Church in Materdomini, Campania, Italy

Coordinates: 40°48′58″N 15°14′00″E

- Basilica Santuario di San Gerardo Maiella
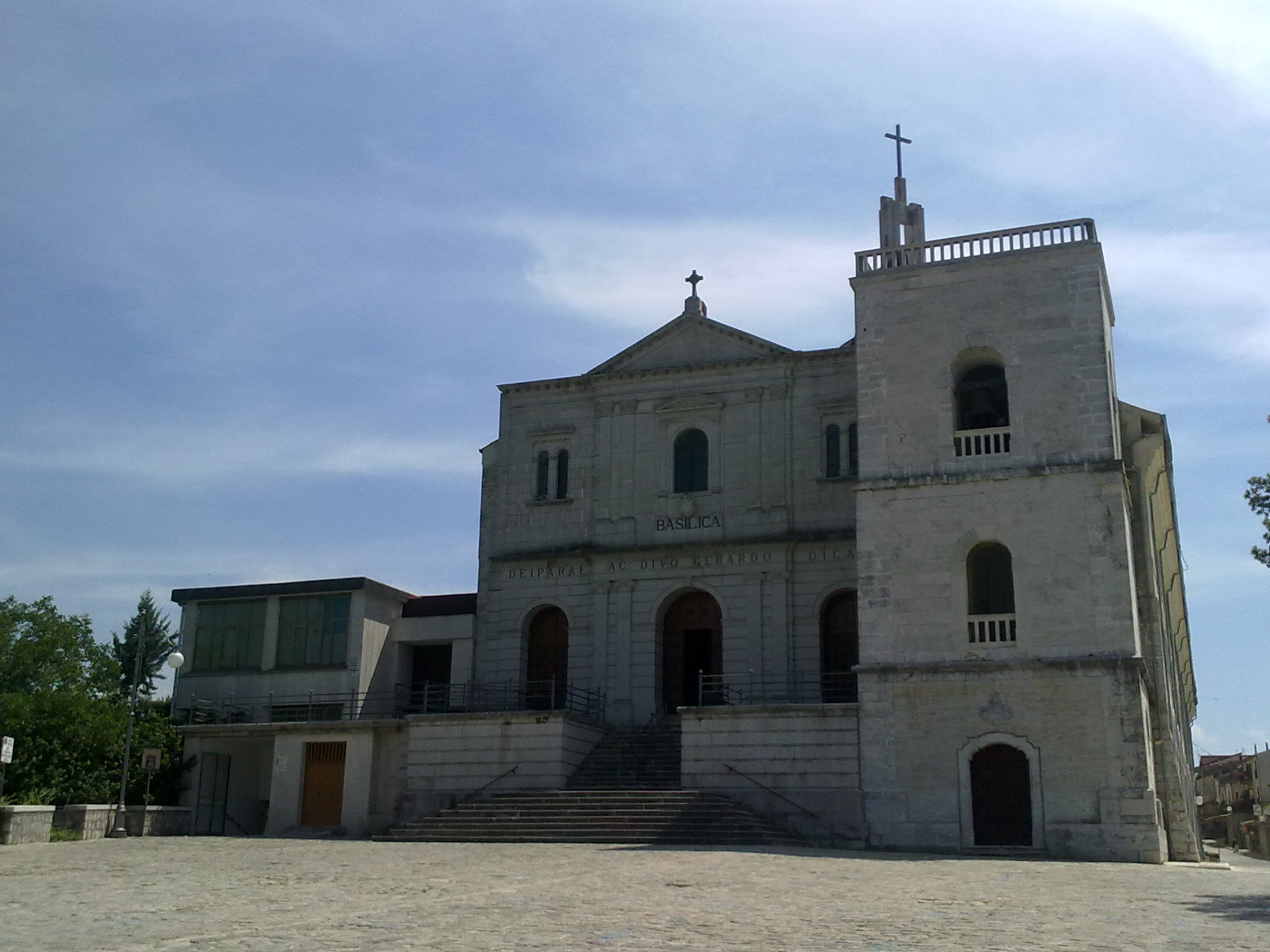
- Façade of the original basilica
- Sanctuary of San Gerardo Maiella
- Location: Materdomini, Campania, Italy
- Denomination: Catholic Church
- Website: www.sangerardo.eu

History
- Former name: Sancta Maria de Silere (1200–1527)
- Status: Minor basilica
- Founded: 1200
- Dedication: Saint Gerard Majella
- Consecrated: August 31, 1929

Architecture
- Style: Neoclassical

Administration
- Archdiocese: Sant'Angelo dei Lombardi-Conza-Nusco-Bisaccia

The Sanctuary of San Gerardo Maiella, co-located with the Basilica of Santa Maria Mater Domini, (Italian: Basilica Santuario di San Gerardo Maiella) is a Roman Catholic church and monastery complex in Materdomini, a frazione of Caposele in the Province of Avellino and the Campania region of Italy. The newer sanctuary is a shrine to Saint Gerard Majella, while the older church is dedicated in the name of Santa Maria Mater Domini and holds the ecclesiastical rank of minor basilica.

== History ==
=== Establishment of a shrine ===
The most ancient documentation of a church at the present location of the sanctuary dates to the year 1200, where a church named Sancta Maria de Silere (in Latin) was administered by the then-Archdiocese of Conza. By the year 1527, the name of the church had changed to Santa Maria Mater Domini. By then, the small church had become popular among pilgrims from the Valle del Sele and surrounding area. In order to accommodate the pilgrims, boarding quarters were built around the church. In the year 1600, a well known as the Well of San Gerardo was built to provide for the church and pilgrims; this well was eventually incorporated into the new shrine built in 1973, and is visible next to the sacristy.

In the 18th century, Saint Alphonsus Maria Liguori climbed to the top of the hill where the church was located to pray to the Virgin Mary and was said to be so moved by its situation that he established a Redemptorist monastery in 1746 in order to care for the sanctuary. The monastery was designed by royal architect Pietro Cimafonte. Gerard Majella visited the sanctuary at the age of 7 with his mother, who was making a pilgrimage there and was moved by the statue of the Virgin Mary. Later, as a Redemptorist brother, Majella was assigned to the monastery in 1754, and died there on October 16, 1755. During the winter famine of 1755, Majella became known for rescuing the poor who appealed to him at the gates of the monastery.

Following the beatification and canonization of Gerard Majella in 1893 and 1904, respectively, the number of pilgrims visiting his grave at the sanctuary increased dramatically, so much so that the Redemptorists considered expanding the small church dedicated to Santa Maria Mater Domini. On October 16, 1913, an expansion project was undertaken and completed with the consecration of the church on August 31, 1929, by the Archbishop of Naples, Cardinal Alessio Ascalesi. Pope Pius XI declared the church a minor basilica on February 18, 1930. A statue of the Madonna in the basilica was crowned in 1931 by Giulio Tommasi, the Archbishop of Conza and the Bishop of Sant'Angelo dei Lombardi, with a golden diadem that was given by the Vatican.

=== New church and reconstruction ===
In 1974, a construction of a new, larger church was undertaken to accommodate even more pilgrims. It was built in the neoclassical style, using Pescopagano stone. It had a cruciform floor plan with a three-part nave taking the shape of a Latin cross. The vault of the nave, above the double arches, was decorated with stuccos accented by gold inlays. Stained glass windows depicted scenes from the life of Saint Gerard. All of these adornments were destroyed on November 23 by the Irpinia earthquake of 1980.

The basilica was not reopened until April 30, 2000, during the Great Jubilee. While it was largely based on the former floor plan, the reopened church was slightly longer, as its interior incorporated the front portico. However, all of the artwork that had adorned the interior prior to the earthquake was lost. The tomb of Saint Gerard was also relocated from the altar in the right aisle to the central aisle. The crystal, silver, and mother of pearl urn containing the relics of the saint lies behind a high-relief marble statue in the chancel of Saint Gerard among the people. Outside of the basilica is a replica of the small room in which Saint Gerard lived during his time in Materdomini, complete with antique furnishings and a replica of the 18th-century terracotta floor.

Today, around one million pilgrims visit the sanctuary basilica each year, with many leaving votive offerings throughout the shrine; of particular note is the "room of bows," in which blue and pink bows are left by mothers giving thanks for miracles received.

== See also ==
- List of Catholic basilicas
- Catholic Church in Italy
- Catholic devotions
