= Lioni =

- Comune
- Comune di Lioni
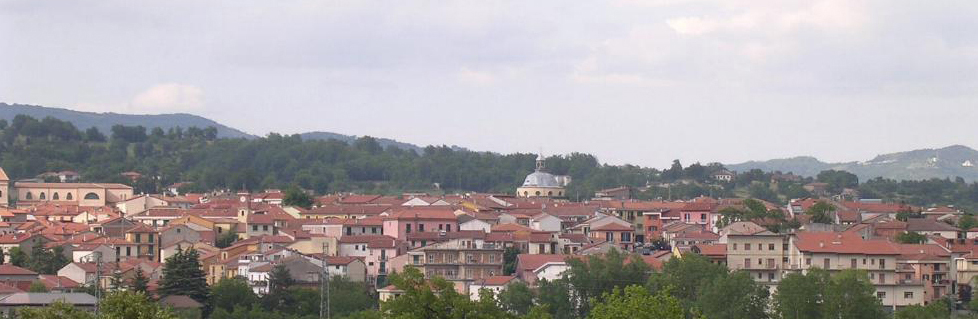
- Panoramic view of Lioni

- Location within Italy Location within Campania
- Coordinates: 40°52′N 15°11′E
- Country: Italy
- Region: Campania
- Province: Avellino (AV)

Government
  - Mayor: Yuri Gioino

Area
  - Total: 46.51 km^{2} (17.96 sq mi)
- Elevation: 550 m (1,800 ft)

Population (30 March 2018)
  - Total: 6,141
  - Density: 132.0/km^{2} (342.0/sq mi)
- Demonym: Lionesi
- Time zone: UTC+1 (CET)
  - Summer (DST): UTC+2 (CEST)
- Postal code: 83047
- Dialing code: 0827
- Patron saint: St. Rocco
- Saint day: August 16
- Website: Official website

Lioni is a town and comune in the province of Avellino, Campania, southern Italy.

Located in western Irpinia, in the Monti Picentini natural park, the municipality borders with Bagnoli Irpino, Calabritto, Caposele, Morra De Sanctis, Nusco, Sant'Angelo dei Lombardi and Teora. It is 50 kilometres (31 mi) from Avellino and is linked by a mountain road to the ski resort of Laceno.

== History ==
The town's name appears for the first time in a donation dated 883, with which the Lombard prince Sichard granted the abbess of S. Sofia a property located in "Lions" (Lioni).

The ancient settlement was probably one of the smaller neighboring towns of Ferentino, a Samnite stronghold destroyed by the Romans during the wars between these two peoples.

The remains of Cyclopean walls typical of Samnite fortified villages were found on mount Oppido between Lioni and Caposele. The walls encompassed an area large enough to hold houses, barns, and land for pasture.

Numerous clay fragments, primarily from tiles and pottery, were found inside the walled area of Oppido. In addition, the town contains foundations of a large building whose layout resembles a medieval castle, and thus suggests continued use of the site in medieval times.

== Twin towns ==
- Rome, Italy
- Sezze, Italy
- Piombino, Italy
- province of Arezzo, Italy
- province of Grosseto, Italy
- province of Pistoia, Italy
- province of Bergamo, Italy

== See also ==
- Irpinia
- 1980 Irpinia earthquake
