= Muro Lucano =

- Comune
- Comune di Muro Lucano
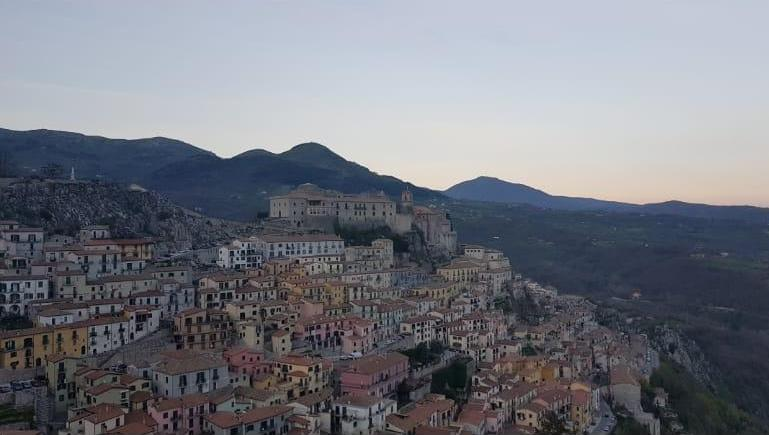
- Panoramic view of Muro Lucano

- Coat of arms

- Location of Muro Lucano in Italy Muro Lucano (Basilicata)
- Coordinates: 40°45′N 15°29′E
- Country: Italy
- Region: Basilicata
- Province: Potenza (PZ)
- Frazioni: Capodigiano, Casale San Giuliano, Le Marze, Pontegiacoia, Raitiello

Government
  - Mayor: Giovanni Setaro (from 10 June 2018) (Brothers of Italy)

Area
  - Total: 126.18 km^{2} (48.72 sq mi)
- Elevation: 600 m (2,000 ft)

Population (31 December 2017)
  - Total: 5,344
  - Density: 42.35/km^{2} (109.7/sq mi)
- Demonym: Muresi
- Time zone: UTC+1 (CET)
  - Summer (DST): UTC+2 (CEST)
- Postal code: 85054
- Dialing code: 0976
- ISTAT code: 076053
- Patron saint: Saint Gerard Majella
- Saint day: September 2
- Website: Official website

Muro Lucano (formerly Muro, until 1863) is a city and comune in the province of Potenza, in the northern part of the region of Basilicata, southern Italy.

== History ==
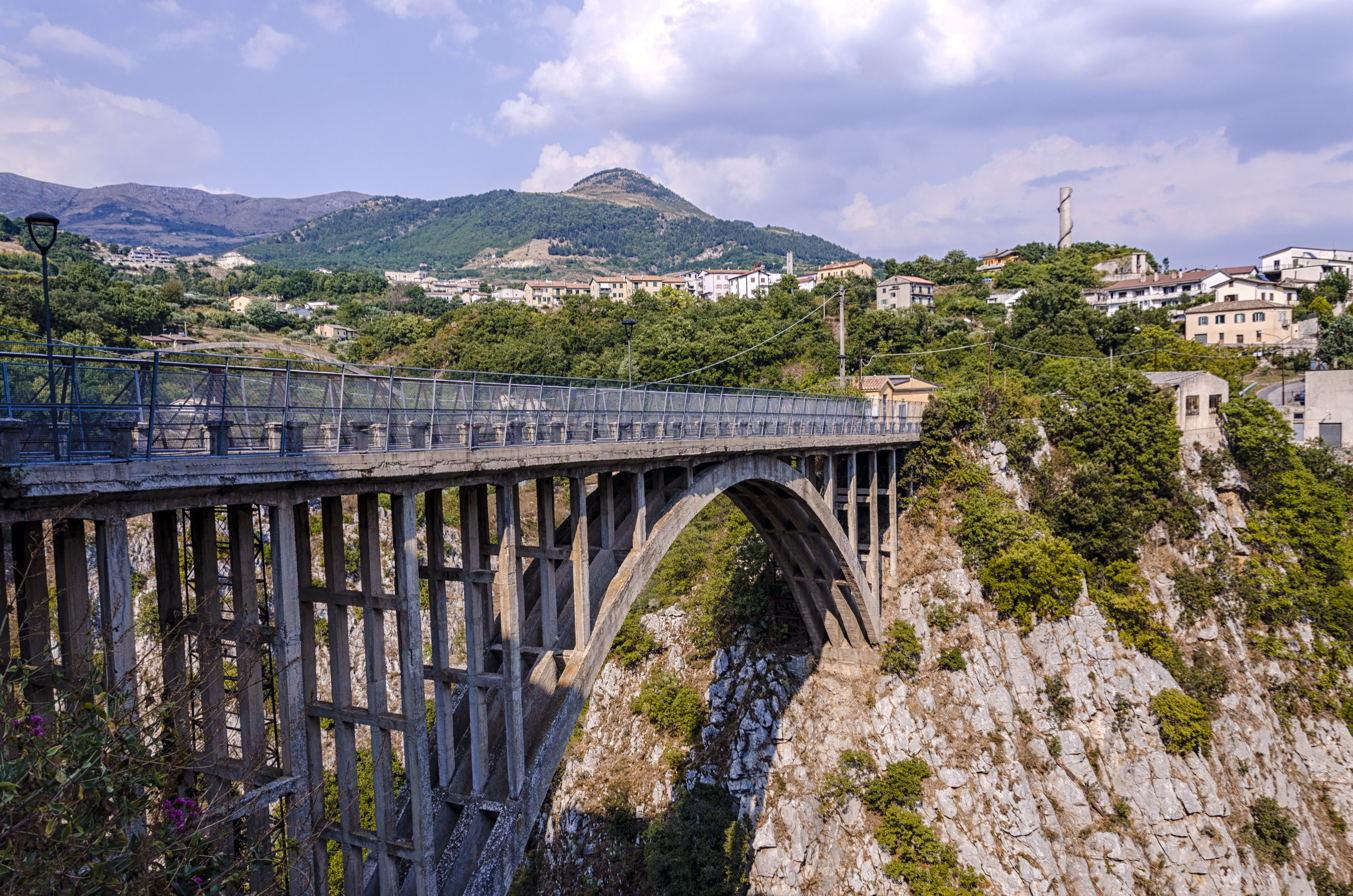
Ponte del Pianello

The city is situated on the site of the ancient Numistri, at the foot of the Apennines, the scene of a clash between Hannibal and Marcellus' forces in the Second Punic War in the year 210 BC.

After the Angevin period, Muro Lucano's castle saw long feuding by the Orsini family until the end of Italian feudalism in 1806. In the eighteenth century, after the earthquake of 1694, the Orsinis made profound changes to the manor by raising the ground floor, knocking down the drawbridge and building a new building leaning on the two towers. The 1980 earthquake necessitated an extensive consolidation process. The part called the prince's apartment had recently been restored.

=== Invasion of Muro ===
On 23 November 1861, Carmine Crocco and José Borjes attacked Muro. In retaliation, national guards, soldiers and citizens, deployed in naturally strong positions, welcomed Crocco's men with shots, disrupting their formations that were forced to flee after suffering heavy losses.

Two years after King Victor Emmanuel II was proclaimed King of Italy, the suffix Lucano was added in order to distinguish the city from Muro Leccese.

=== Earthquake ===
On 23 November 1980, Muro Lucano was strongly affected by the Irpinia earthquake. The city's infrastructure was severely damaged, the renovation of which, for over forty years, has been at the center of a strong controversy. There were multiple disputes over housing due to the new architectural plans of the administration, some houses were forced to be connected to one another. The administrations that have succeeded one another to date have admitted the delay in the restructuring works, represented in particular by the state of the elementary schools in the municipality.

=== Honors ===
On 23 November 1980, the date of the earthquake, Muro Lucano received the Gold Medal for Civil Merit.

On 4 October 2012, the President of the Italian Republic Giorgio Napolitano accepted the request of Interior Minister Anna Maria Cancellieri which gave Muro Lucano the honorary title of City.

== Main sights ==
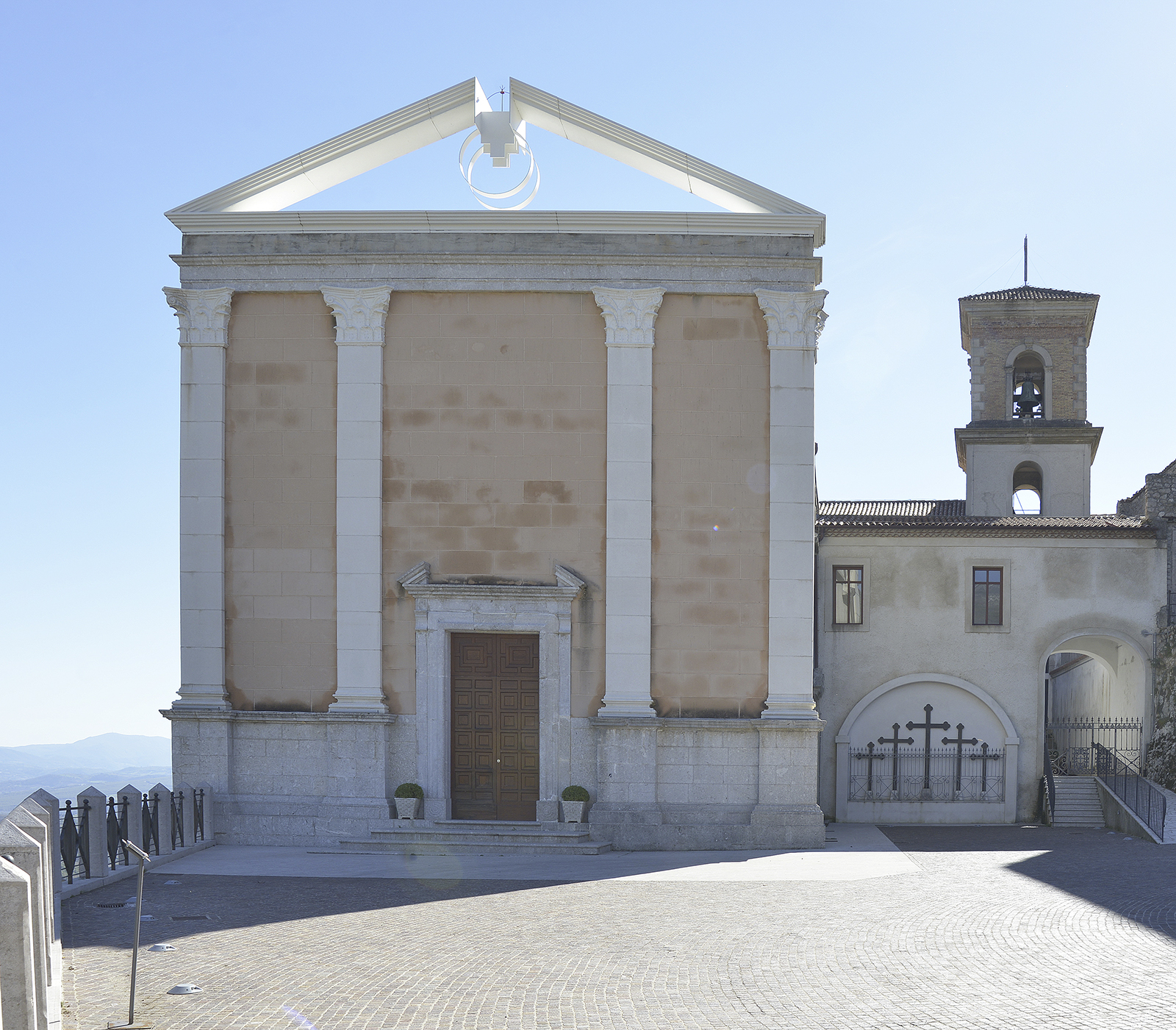
Concattedrale di San Nicola e Camera

The city has a cathedral; and it was in its castle that Queen Joan I of Naples was murdered on the orders of her adopted son Charles III of Naples.

== Geography ==
=== Overview ===
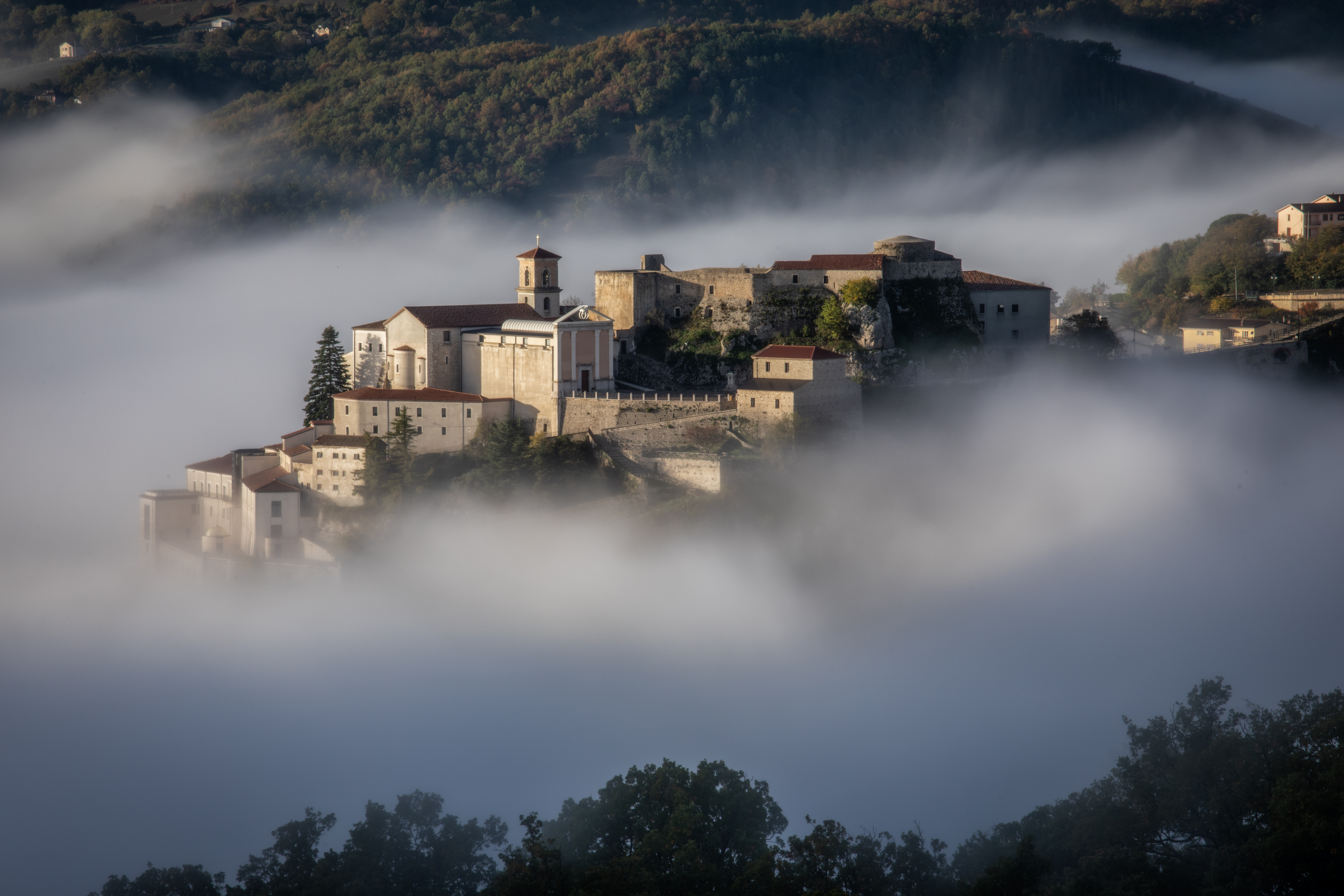
A sunrise in Muro Lucano

The city of Muro Lucano is composed of the old town and the surrounding areas of Cappuccini to the north and Giardini (meaning gardens) to the south. It is 51 kilometres (32 mi) from Potenza, the chief city of the province. Muro Lucano rises 650 metres (2,130 ft) above sea level, occupies a surface area of 125.7 square kilometres (48.5 mi^{2}) and in 2005 had a population of approximately 6,000. The population, which was over 10,000 in the 1950s, has been declining steadily through the years due to social changes, lack of local work and large scale emigration. There are about 2,200 families with an average of close to 2.7 people per family.

The territory of the municipality is between 300 and 1,450 metres (980 and 4,760 ft) above sea level. The city lies on a slope over the Muro ravine, with quaint houses built on terraces. The name of the city comes from the medieval wall (in Italian muro) that surrounded the medieval centre.

== Dialect ==
Murese, the city's dialect, is spoken only in the immediate vicinity and can be difficult for Italian speakers to comprehend.

== Notable people ==
- Anne Bancroft - actress
- Salvatore Capezio - shoemaker
- Joan I of Naples - queen
- Antonio Rosario Mennonna - prelate
- Saint Gerard Majella - Catholic saint
- Bartolomeo Rosa (1648–1688) - bishop
- Joseph Stella - painter
- Cristian Zaccardo - footballer

== Twin towns and municipalities ==
- (Italy) Baragiano, since April 6, 2011
- (Italy) Contursi Terme
- (Italy) Corato, since 2015
- (Germany) Karlsfeld, since March 5, 2011
- (Italy) Ripacandida, since 2002
- (Italy) San Fele, since April 6, 2010
- (Italy) Vietri di Potenza, since April 6, 2013
