= Castelnuovo di Conza =

- Comune
- Comune di Castelnuovo di Conza
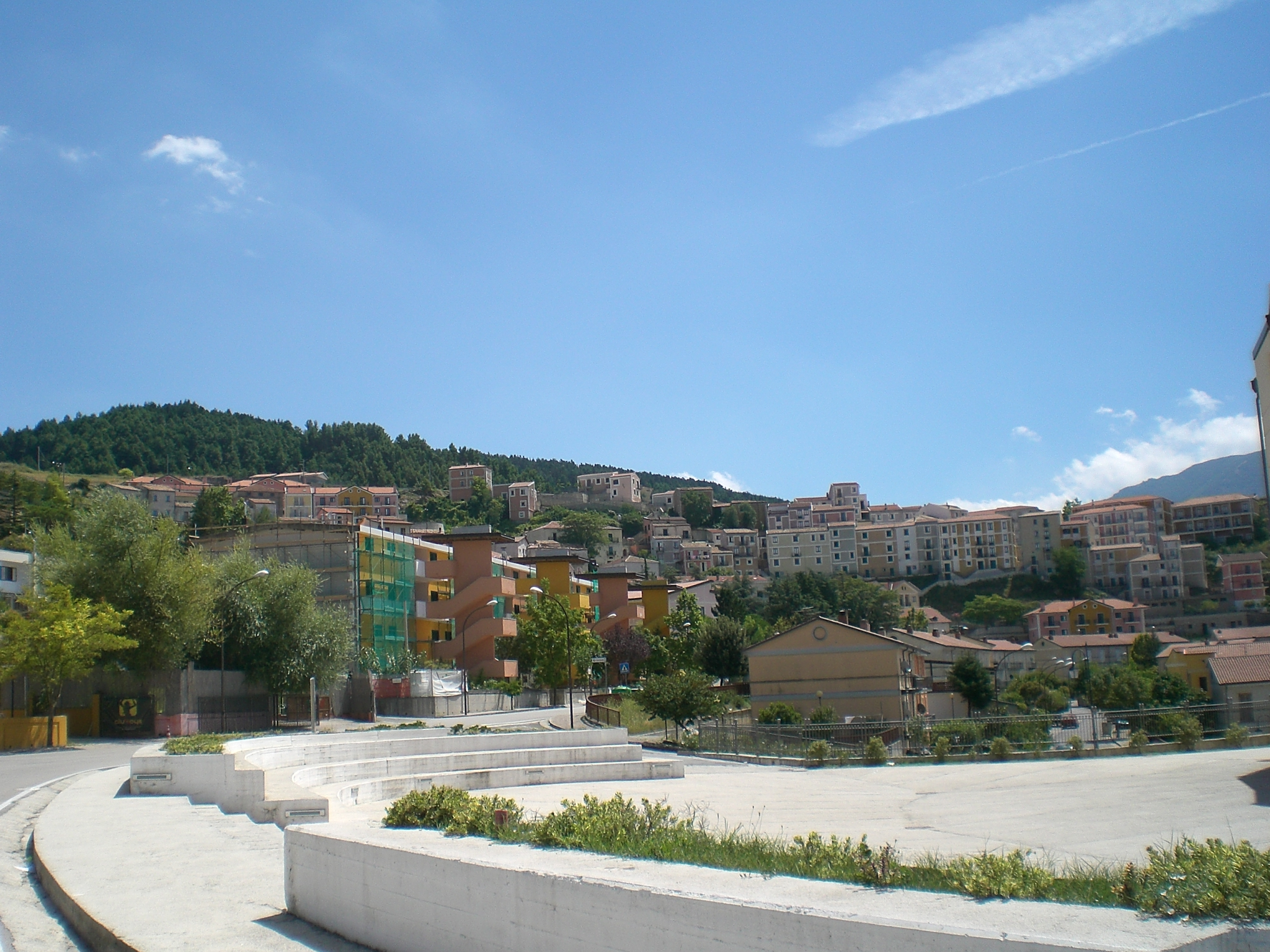

- Location within Italy Location within Campania
- Coordinates: 40°49′N 15°19′E
- Country: Italy
- Region: Campania
- Province: Salerno (SA)

Government
  - Mayor: Michele Iannuzzelli

Area
  - Total: 14.06 km^{2} (5.43 sq mi)
- Elevation: 650 m (2,130 ft)

Population (30 June 2017)
  - Total: 600
  - Density: 43/km^{2} (110/sq mi)
- Demonym: Castelnuovesi
- Time zone: UTC+1 (CET)
  - Summer (DST): UTC+2 (CEST)
- Postal code: 84020
- Dialing code: 0828
- ISTAT code: 065033
- Website: Official website

Castelnuovo di Conza is a town and comune in the province of Salerno in the Campania region of southwestern Italy. The town suffered heavy damage in the 1980 earthquake of Irpinia, but has since been rebuilt.
