= Saint-Gérard-Majella, Quebec =

Saint-Gérard-Majella
- Parish municipality
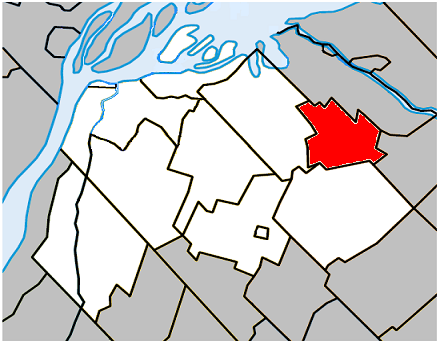
- Location within Pierre-De Saurel RCM.

- Location in southern Quebec.
- Coordinates: 46°00′N 72°50′W
- Country: Canada
- Province: Quebec
- Region: Montérégie
- RCM: Pierre-De Saurel
- Constituted: February 18, 1907
- Named for: Gerard Majella

Government
  - Mayor: Marie Léveillée
  - Federal riding: Bécancour—Nicolet—Saurel—Alnôbak
  - Prov. riding: Richelieu

Area
  - Total: 38.20 km^{2} (14.75 sq mi)
  - Land: 38.32 km^{2} (14.80 sq mi)
- There is an apparent contradiction between two authoritative sources

Population (2021)
  - Total: 240
  - Density: 6.3/km^{2} (16/sq mi)
  - Pop 2016-2021: ▼0.8%
  - Dwellings: 105
- Time zone: UTC−5 (EST)
  - Summer (DST): UTC−4 (EDT)
- Postal code(s): J0G 1X1
- Area codes: 450 and 579
- Highways: R-122; R-132
- Website: saintgerardmajella.ca

Saint-Gérard-Majella (French pronunciation: [sɛ̃ ʒeʁaʁ maʒɛla]) is a parish municipality located in the Pierre-De Saurel Regional County Municipality of Québec (Canada), in the administrative region of Montérégie. The population as of the Canada 2021 Census was 240.

== Demographics ==
In the 2021 Census of Population conducted by Statistics Canada, Saint-Gérard-Majella had a population of 240 living in 103 of its 105 total private dwellings, a change of −0.8% from its 2016 population of 242. With a land area of 38.32 km^{2} (14.80 sq mi), it had a population density of 6.3/km^{2} (16.2/sq mi) in 2021.

Population trend:

Census	Population	Change (%)
2021	240	▼0.8%
2016	242	▼1.6%
2011	246	▼2.4%
2006	252	▼1.9%
2001	257	▼0.4%
1996	258	▼5.1%
1991	272	▼9.9%
1986	302	▼8.5%
1981	330	▼7.0%
1976	355	▼2.7%
1971	365	▼13.5%
1966	422	▼10.8%
1961	473	0.0%
1956	473	▼1.5%
1951	480	▲9.8%
1941	437	▲2.1%
1931	428	▼8.5%
1921	468	▼9.1%
1911	515	N/A

Mother tongue language (2021)

Language	Population	Pct (%)
French only	225	93.8%
English only	0	0.0%
Both English & French	5	2.1%
Other languages	5	2.1%

== See also ==
- List of parish municipalities in Quebec
