= Teora =

- Comune
- Comune di Teora
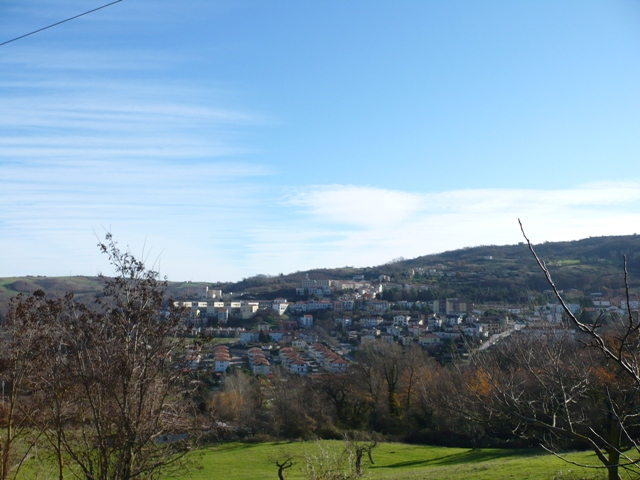

- Location within Italy Location within Campania
- Coordinates: 40°51′08″N 15°15′14″E
- Country: Italy
- Region: Campania
- Province: Avellino (AV)

Government
  - Mayor: Stefano Farina

Area
  - Total: 23.21 km^{2} (8.96 sq mi)
- Elevation: 660 m (2,170 ft)

Population (31 December 2017)
  - Total: 1,494
  - Density: 64.37/km^{2} (166.7/sq mi)
- Demonym: Teoresi
- Time zone: UTC+1 (CET)
  - Summer (DST): UTC+2 (CEST)
- Postal code: 83056
- Dialing code: 0827
- Patron saint: Saint Nicolas
- Saint day: 6 December
- Website: Official website

Teora is a small town and comune in the province of Avellino, in the Campania region of southern Italy.

== Geography ==
Teora is bordered by the towns of Caposele, Conza della Campania, Lioni and Morra De Sanctis.

== History ==
The origin of the village was recorded by the Greek historian Dionysius of Halicarnassus (1st century BC) and by the Roman historian Marcus Terentius Varro.

It was also reported that the tribuno della plebe Milo died there during the civil war between Julius Caesar and Pompey in the Roman era. In a privilege of 1200, granted by Pope Innocent III to Pantaleone, archbishop of Conza, Teora is referred to using the name Tugurium Biarium for the first time.

In the late Middle Ages and modern era it was a fief hold by several local noble families.

Three earthquakes have occurred in Teora, in 1694, 1732, and 1980 respectively; the last earthquake destroyed much of the village's historical and cultural identity.

== Main sights ==
- Fountain of Monte, also called the fountain of the dead men, has its origins in the 12th century, when the Church of Conza was designated by pope Callixtus II as a necropolis.
- Church of Saint Nicholas
- Corona flour mill
- Fountain (public washhouse) of Piano
- Stone of the civil weddings

== Culture ==
Squaqqualacchiun' is a typical masque related to the day of Saint Anthony, January 17, on which the first day of the carnival is held. This event is featured in the Museum of Popular Traditions at Caserta.

== Sources ==
- Donatello, Filomena (1998). Teora nei documenti e nei monumenti. Avellino: IRB Redi Editore.
