= 1980 Irpinia earthquake =

1980 earthquake in southern Italy

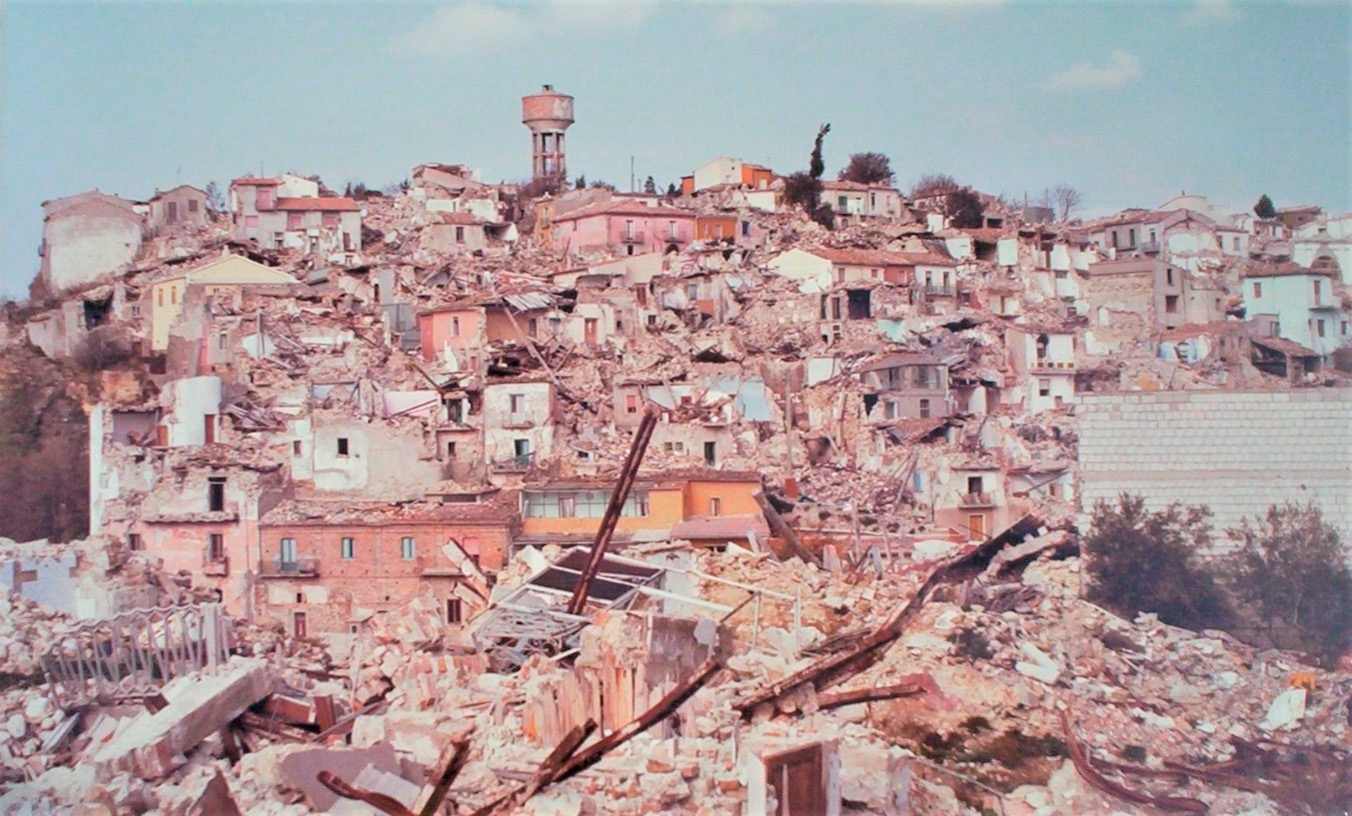
- Destruction in Conza della Campania after the earthquake

- Location within Italy
- UTC time: 1980-11-23 18:34:52
- ISC event: 635924
- USGS-ANSS: ComCat
- Local date: 23 November 1980
- Local time: 19:34:52 CET
- Magnitude: 6.9 M_{w}
- Depth: 10 kilometres (6.2 mi)
- Epicenter: 40.84°N 15.28°E
- Type: Dip-slip
- Areas affected: Italy
- Total damage: US$20 billion ($73.9 billion in 2024, adjusted for inflation)
- Max. intensity: MMI X (Extreme)
- Casualties: 2,483–4,900 dead 7,700–8,934 injured 250,000 displaced

The 1980 Irpinia earthquake (Italian: Terremoto dell'Irpinia) took place in Italy on 23 November 1980, with a moment magnitude of 6.9 and a maximum Mercalli intensity of X (Extreme). It left at least 2,483 people dead, at least 7,700 injured, and 250,000 homeless.

== Earthquake ==
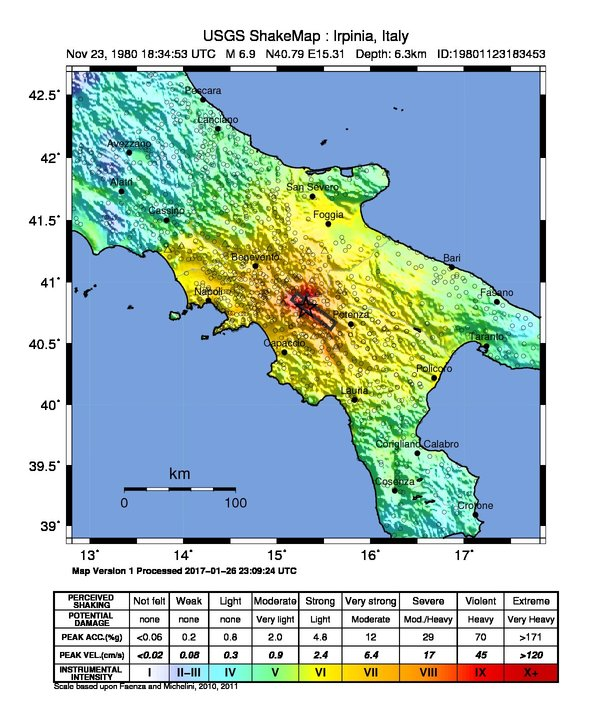
Map of earthquake intensity

The earthquake struck at 18:34 UTC (19:34 local) on 23 November 1980, centered on the village of Castelnuovo di Conza, Campania, Southern Italy. The first jolt was followed by 90 aftershocks. There were three main shocks, each with epicenters in a different place, within 80 seconds. The largest shock registered a peak acceleration of 0.38 g, with 10 seconds of motion greater than 0.1 g. The three main shocks combined produced 70 seconds of shaking greater than 0.01 g. Thus the shaking was severe and lasted a long time.

The focal mechanism corresponded to normal and significant left-lateral strike-slip movement. The rupture dimensions was estimated to be 14 km × 40 km (8.7 mi × 24.9 mi) based on the aftershock distribution. The study of near-field strong motion and leveling records revealed a complex rupture process comprising three subevents. Overall, the rupture on complex fault systems propagated bilaterally along a mostly northwest–southeast trend.

== Impact ==
Towns in the province of Avellino were hit the hardest. In Sant'Angelo dei Lombardi, 300 were killed, including 27 children in an orphanage, and 80 percent of the town was destroyed and many historical buildings were left in ruins as the town never fully recovered as of 2021. One hundred were killed in Balvano when a medieval church collapsed during Sunday services. The towns of Lioni, Conza della Campania (near the epicenter), and Teora were destroyed, and dozens of structures in Naples were levelled, including a 10-story apartment building. Damage was spread over more than 26,000 km^{2} (10,000 sq mi), including Naples and Salerno.

== Rebuilding ==
The Italian government spent 59 trillion lire (equivalent to €151 billion in 2020) on reconstruction, while other nations sent contributions. West Germany contributed 32 million United States dollars (USD) and the United States US$70 million.

However, in the early 1990s a major corruption scandal emerged. Of the billions of lire that were earmarked for aid to the victims and rebuilding, the largest part disappeared from the earthquake reconstruction funds in the 1980s. Of the $40 billion spent on earthquake reconstruction, an estimated $20 billion went to create an entirely new social class of millionaires in the region, $6.4 billion went to the criminal Camorra, whereas another $4 billion went to politicians in bribes. Only the remaining $9.6 billion, a quarter of the total amount, was actually spent on people's needs.

The Camorra entered the construction industry after the quake.

== See also ==
- List of earthquakes in 1980
- List of earthquakes in Italy
- 1930 Irpinia earthquake
- List of earthquakes in Irpinia
