= Gerard Majella =

Italian Roman Catholic saint

Saint Gerard Majella CSsR
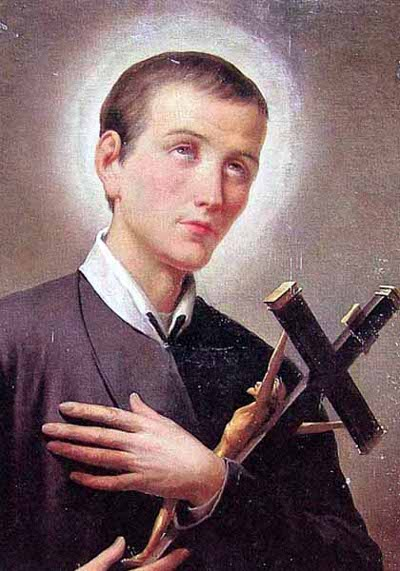

Religious Confessor
- Born: 6 April 1726; Muro Lucano, Basilicata, Kingdom of Naples
- Died: 16 October 1755 (aged 29); Materdomini, Campania, Kingdom of Naples
- Venerated in: Catholic Church (The Redemptorists and Campania, Italy)
- Beatified: 29 January 1893 by Pope Leo XIII
- Canonized: 11 December 1904 by Pope Pius X
- Major shrine: Shrine of St. Gerard Majella, Materdomini, Avellino, Italy
- Feast: 16 October
- Attributes: Young man in a Redemptorist habit, skull
- Patronage: Children (and unborn children in particular); childbirth; mothers (and expectant mothers in particular); motherhood; falsely accused people; good confessions; lay brothers.

Gerard Majella (Italian: Gerardo Maiella; 6 April 1726 – 16 October 1755) was an Italian lay brother of the Congregation of the Most Holy Redeemer, better known as the Redemptorists, who is honored as a saint by the Catholic Church.

His intercession within the Catholic Church is for children, unborn children, women in childbirth, mothers, expectant mothers, motherhood, the falsely accused, good confessions, lay brothers and Muro Lucano, Italy.

== Life ==
Gerard Maiella or Majella was born in Muro Lucano, Italy, on 6 April 1726, the youngest of five children. He was apparently frail from birth. His parents had him baptized the day he was born. His father was Domenico Maiella, a tailor who died when Gerard was twelve, leaving the family in poverty. His mother, Benedetta Galella, then sent him to her brother so that he could teach Gerard to sew and follow in his father's footsteps. However, the foreman was said to have been abusive. While Gerard kept silent, his uncle found out and had the foreman dismissed. After four years of apprenticeship, he took a job as a servant to work for the local Bishop of Lacedonia. Upon the bishop's death, Gerard returned to his trade, working first as a journeyman and then on his own account, but earned a minimal income.

the foreman was abusive due to gered being deeply in prayer during work

He tried to join the Capuchin Order twice, but was prevented by ill health. In 1749, he finally joined the Congregation of the Most Holy Redeemer, known as Redemptorists. The order had been recently set up in 1732 by Alphonsus Liguori (1696-1787) at Scala, near Naples and dedicated to preaching the word of God to the poor as well as leading missions and retreats.

During his life, Gerard developed a close bond with the Neapolitan peasant community. In his work with the Redemptorist community, he was variously a gardener, sacristan, tailor, porter, cook, carpenter, and clerk of works on the new buildings at Caposele.

At 27, he faced scandal after being identified by a young pregnant woman as the father of her child. To avoid exposing the father, Gerard seemingly accepted the blame silently. His superior, Alphonsus Liguori, questioned him and banned him from receiving Holy Communion. After several years, the woman subsequently retracted the allegation.

He died at 29 of tuberculosis on 16 October 1755 in Materdomini, Italy. His last will has been written as a small note on the door of his cell: "Here the will of God is done, as God wills, and as long as God wills."

== Veneration ==
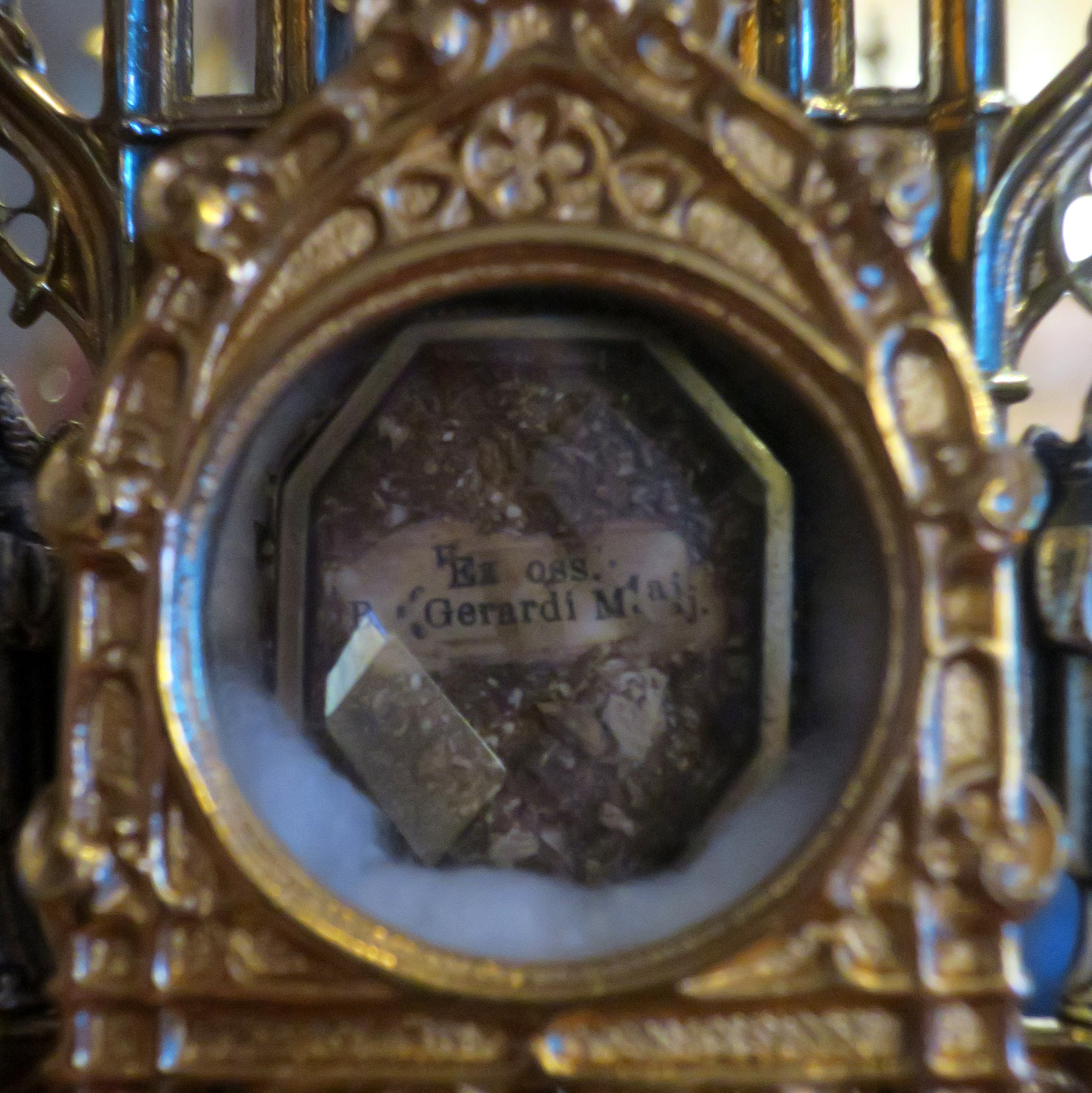
A relic of Majella on display for veneration in Lima, Ohio.

Majella was beatified in Rome on 29 January 1893 by Pope Leo XIII. He was canonized less than twelve years later on 11 December 1904 by Pope Pius X. Four years later, St Gerard's, a Redemptorist church in Wellington, New Zealand, was dedicated to him, perhaps the first in the world.

The feast day of Saint Gerard Majella is October 16.

In 1977, St. Gerard's Chapel in St. Lucy's Church (Newark, New Jersey) was dedicated as a national shrine. Each year during the Feast days, which include October 16, there are traditional lights, music, food stands, and a street procession. People come from all over to celebrate. Devotees also visit the shrine throughout the year to petition the help of St. Gerard.

The St. Gerard Majella Annual Novena takes place every year at St. Joseph's Church in Dundalk, Ireland. This annual nine-day novena is the biggest festival of faith in Ireland. St. Joseph's sponsors the St. Gerard's Family League, an association of Christians united in prayer for their own and other families, to preserve Christian values in their home and family lives.

The Sanctuary of San Gerardo Maiella is a basilica in Materdomini, Italy dedicated to him.

=== Hagiography ===
Some of Majella's reported miracles include restoring life to a boy who had fallen from a high cliff, blessing the scant supply of wheat belonging to a poor family and making it last until the next harvest, and several times multiplying the bread that he was distributing to the poor.

One day, he walked across the water to lead a boatload of fishermen through stormy waves to the safety of the shore. He was reputed to have had bilocation and the ability to read souls.

=== Patron of mothers ===
One alleged miracle in particular explains how Majella subsequently became known as the special patron of mothers. A few months before his death, he visited the Pirofalo family and accidentally dropped his handkerchief. One of the Pirofalo girls spotted the handkerchief moments after he had left the house, and she ran after Gerard to return it, but he told her to keep it in case she might need it someday. Years later, when the girl, now a married woman, was on the verge of dying in childbirth, she remembered the earlier words. She asked for the handkerchief to be brought to her. Almost immediately, the pain disappeared and she gave birth to a healthy child. Word of the apparent miracle spread quickly. During the process for his beatification, one witness testified that he was known as "il santo dei felice parti," the saint of happy childbirths.

His devotion has become very popular in North America, both in the United States and Canada.

== Namesakes ==
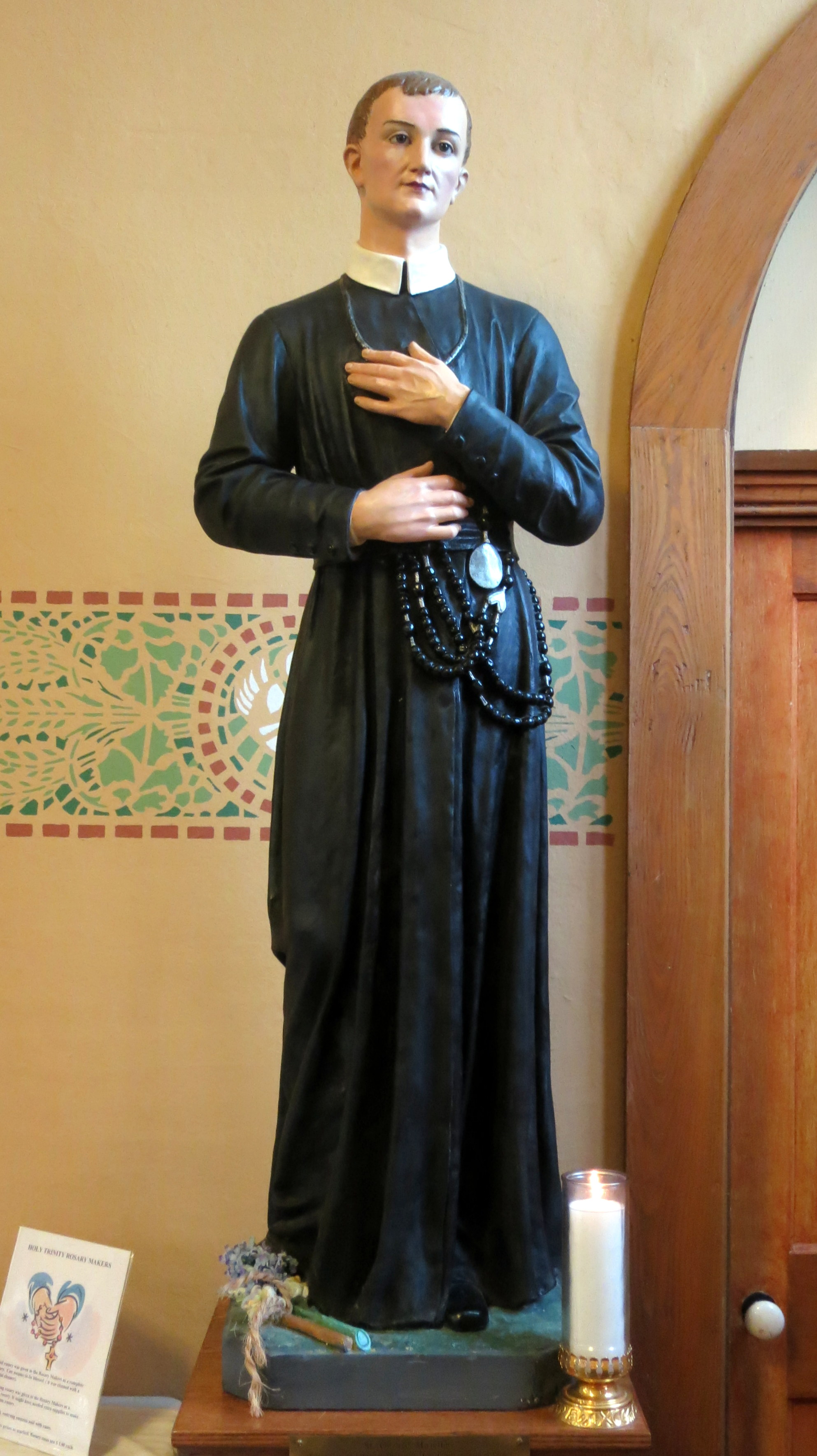
Statue of Gerard Majella at the Holy Trinity Catholic Church, Trinity, Indiana

The Senior Coroner for Liverpool and Wirral sits at the Gerard Majella Courthouse in Liverpool.

Two towns in Quebec, Canada, are named in his honour: one in the Montérégie region and another in the Lanaudière region. Another town, St-Jean-Sur-Richelieu, has one of its parishes named after him.

In Ghent (Belgium) a model school was named after Saint Gerard. This school was exhibited on the International Exposition (1913) in Ghent as a model for Belgium's future school buildings. In 1914 it was rebuilt after the exhibition with the same stones. Nowadays the Saint Gerard School is used by a charity organisation "Geraarke" (local name) which supports poor people with clothes and food packages. In Nigeria, there is a shrine dedicated to St Gerard Majella at a place called Oba, in Anambra State. It was given to the Redemptorists of the Vice-Province of Nigeria by the Archbishop of Onitsha, Most Rev. Valerian Okeke. The Redemptorists also built a school for the poor and most abandoned in the shrine site dedicated to St Gerard Majella.

He was featured on an Italian 45-eurocent postage stamp in May 2005.
