= Khatav =

Khatav Taluka
- Taluka
- Location in Maharashtra, India
- Coordinates: 17.6545°N 74.3614°E
- Country: India
- State: Maharashtra
- District: Satara
- Taluka H.Q.: Vaduj
- Elevation Marathi: 777 m (2,549 ft)

Population (2011)
  - Khatav Taluka: 275,274
  - Khatav Town: 9,827

Languages
  - Official: Marathi
- Time zone: UTC+5:30 (IST)
- Revenue Circles in Taluka: Pusegaon, Khatav, Aundh, Vaduj, Katarkhatav, Mayani, Pusesavali
- Major Highways: NH-548C, NH-160

Khatav is a town and taluka (administrative division) located in the Man-Khatav subdivision of the Satara district, India.

== Geography ==
Khatav is situated to the south of the Satara district. Vaduj is the headquarters of the taluka, which is located 13 km south of Khatav. Khatav is surrounded by the Maan, Karad, Phaltan and Koregaon talukas and Sangli district boundary. The taluka receives less rainfall than most and is categorized as a drought affected region. The Yerla River originates in the north of Khatav taluka and flows in the southeasterly direction through taluka.

== History ==
Khatav is an ancient place in satara district, situated at the spiritual edge of Yerla River. Khatav was prosperous town and market place in past. Khatav had a military base at the time of Chhatrapati Shivaji Maharaj. Sarnobat Prataprao Gujar was native in Bhosare village which village is adjacent to Khatav. Khatav have some of old damaged places still exist it need to preserve. In Khatav there are historical fortress still intact the past glory of town but now damaged. In 1864, Khatav taluka was bifurcated into Khatav and Malshiras talukas. On 1 August 1875, Malshiras taluka was transferred to Solapur district. Prime minister Narendra Modi's one of the most famous mentor named Lakshman Rao Madhav Rao Inamdar was native in Khatav.

== Towns in the taluka ==
Vaduj is the main town of Khatav Taluka. Most government offices like Telecom(BSNL), State Bank of India (SBI), PWD, district court are located in Vaduj. This town has a population of around 17,636. Mayani is a well developed town in Khatav Taluka. All the facilities like education, hospitals, banking, market are present in this town.

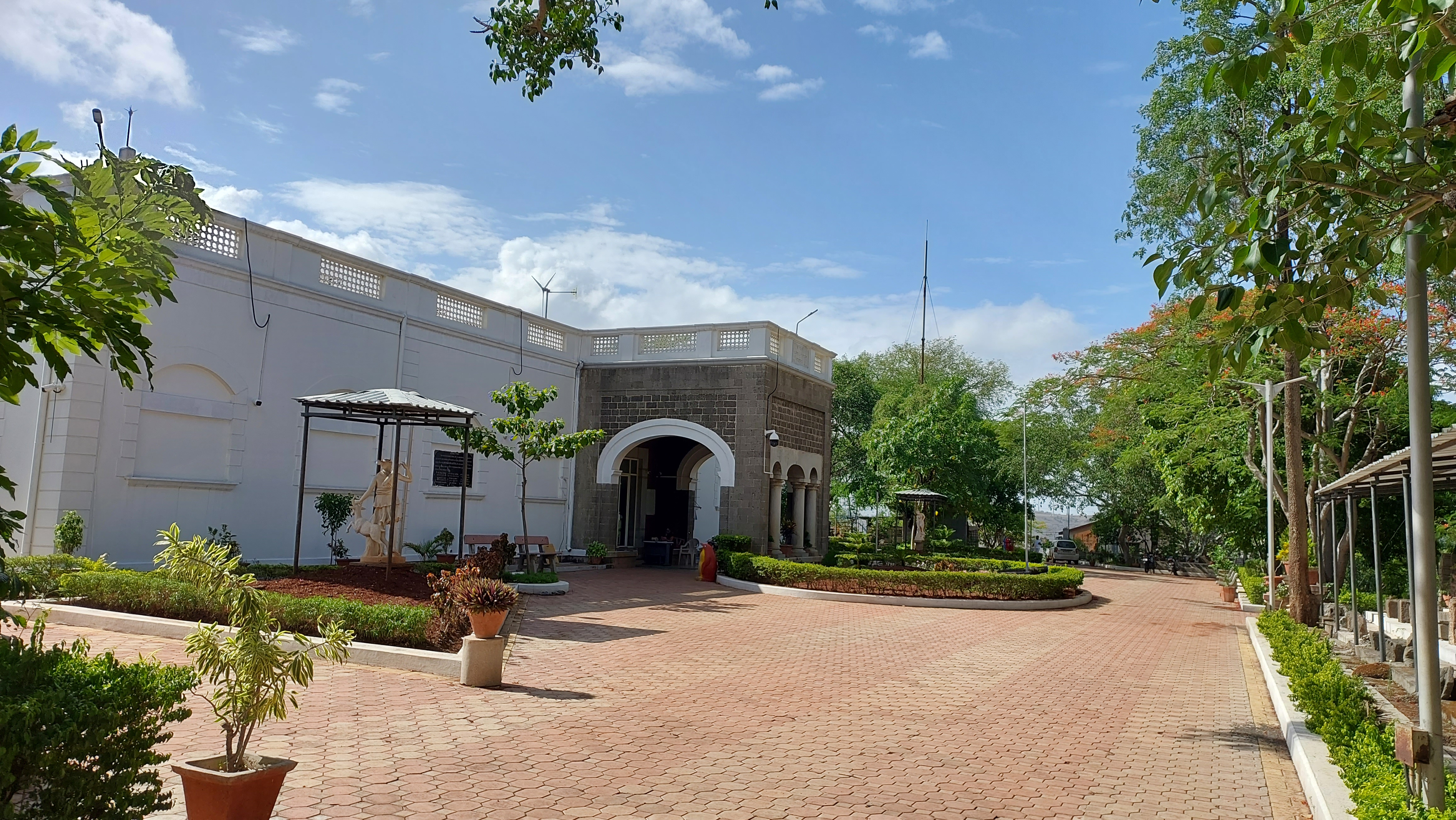
Shri Bhavani Museum & Library,Aundh

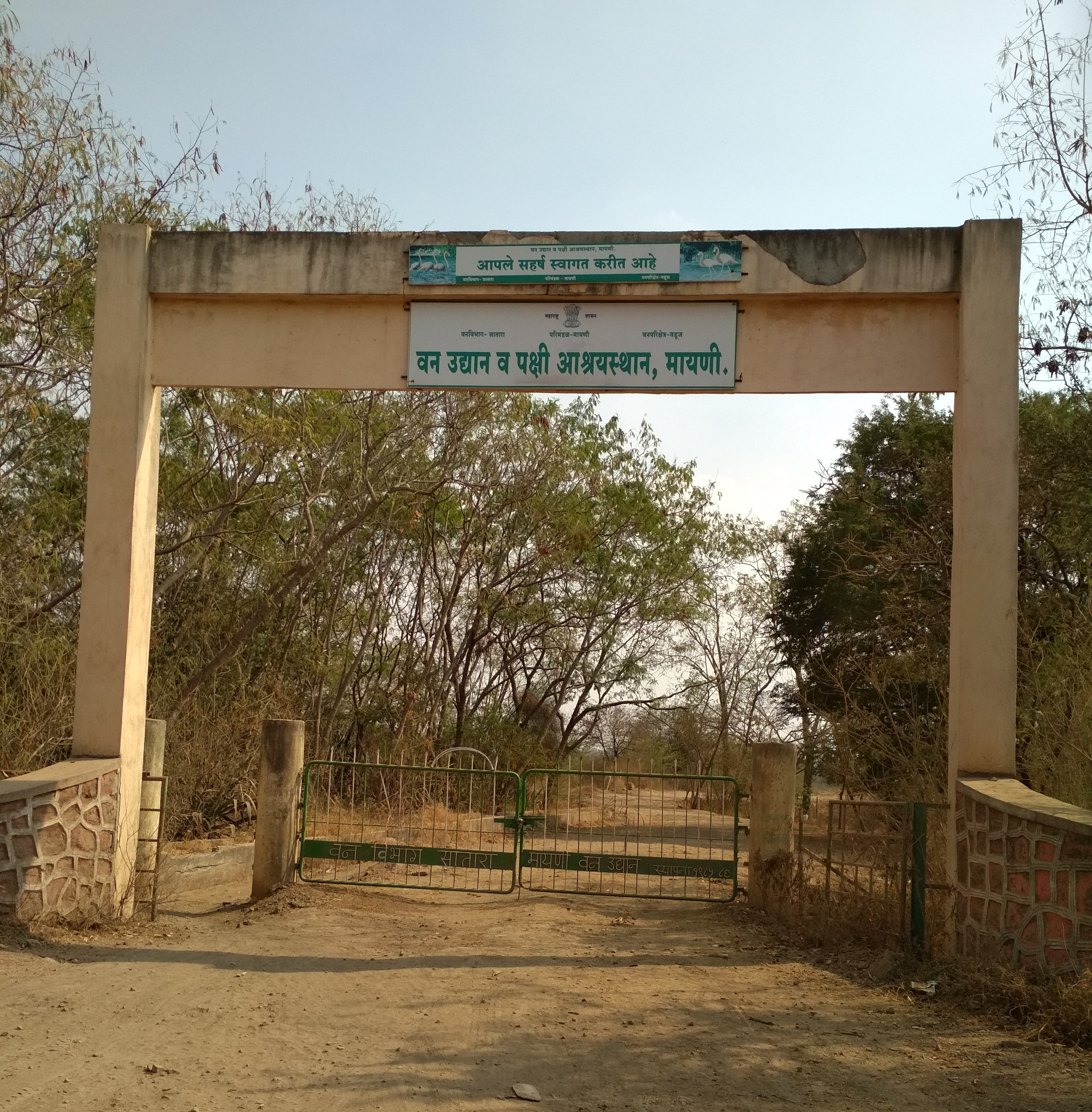
Mayani Bird Sanctuary, Mayani

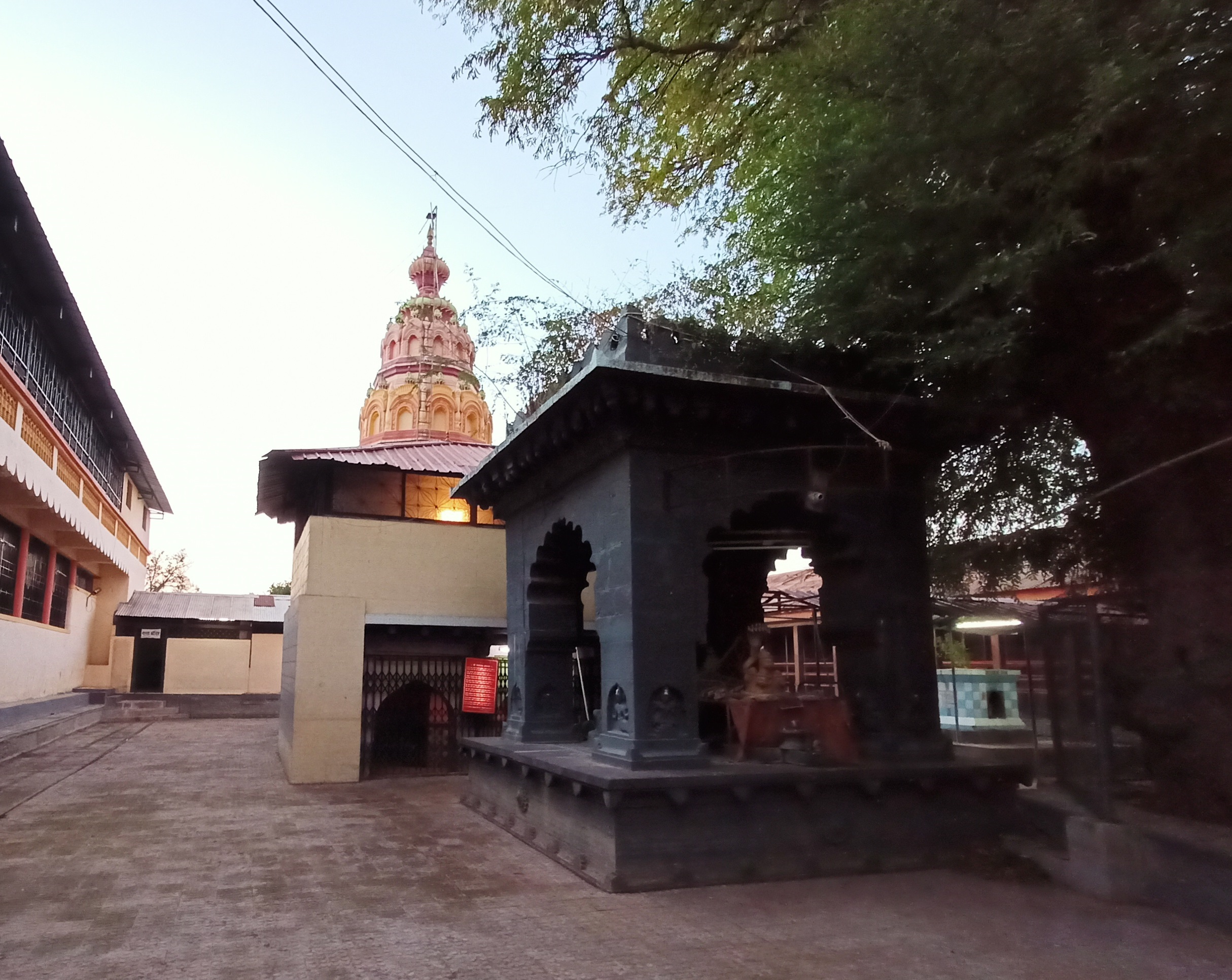
Shree Nagnath Temple, Nagnathwadi

Major towns/villages in Khatav taluka
No.	Town/village Name	Population
1.	Vaduj	17,636
2.	Mayani	10,872
3.	Pusegaon	9,180
4.	Khatav	9,827
5.	Nimsod	6,984
6.	Kaledhon	6,915
7.	Pusesavali	5,982
8.	Budh	5,828
9.	Kuroli	5,519
10.	Aundh	5,653
11.	Ambavade	4,004
12.	Katarkhatav	3,997
13.	Diskal	4,472
14.	Lalgun	2,930
15.	Mhasurne	4,545
16.	Visapur	4,647
17.	Tadavale	1,600
18.	Hingane	1,355
19.	Mandave	1,808
20.	Nidhal	3,596
21.	Chitali	5,802
22.	Katgun	3,319
23.	Nagnathwadi	788

== Kalambi Stone Labyrinths ==
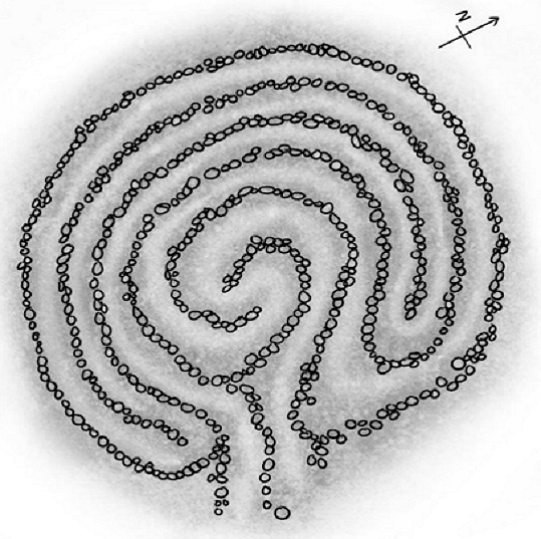
Kalambi-III Labyrinth, Khatav, Satara

There are at least four ancient stone labyrinths (Kalambi I, II, III and IV) are situated close to each other in a remote, open pasture area known as "Kodyache Maal" approximately 1.6 kilometers northeast of Kalambi in Khatav Tehsil of Satara district. These labyrinths are part of a larger series of discovery in the region and are believed to be around 2000 years old, potentially linked to ancient Indo-Roman trade routes. Archaeologists suggest these labyrinths served as navigational markers for merchants traveling inland from the west coast of India to important trade centers like Kolhapur and Karad during the Satavahana dynasty. The designs resemble symbols found on Roman coins in 1st & 3rd centuries, highlighting ancient global trade connections. Similar labyrinths structures are also found in the nearby Sangli, Kolhapur & Solapur districts. The presence of labyrinths across Satara, Sangli, Kolhapur & Solapur districts suggests this entrie belt was a bustling trade route- or 'Silk route' for Graeco-Roman merchants. "Beyond navigation, labyrinths are associated with fertility in many cultures and serve as meditation tools. Locally, they are called 'Kode' (puzzle), but are also known as 'chakravyuh', 'manchakra' and 'yamadwar' in different traditions".

== Notable people ==
- Sarnobat Prataprao Gujar
- Bhawanrao Shriniwasrao Pant Pratinidhi
- Mahatma Jyotirao Phule
- Appasaheb Balasaheb Pant
- Pandurang Vasudeo Sukhatme
- Babasaheb Anantrao Bhosale
- Laxman Rao Madhav Rao Inamdar
- Ranjit Vasantrao More
