= Mayani =

Town in Maharashtra, India

- Town
- Location in Maharashtra, India
- Coordinates: 17.4420253°N 74.5494988°E
- Country: India
- State: Maharashtra
- District: Satara
- Taluka: Khatav
- Taluka H.Q.: Vaduj

Government
  - Body: Gram Panchayat

Population (2011)
  - Total: 10,872

Languages
  - Official: Marathi
- Time zone: UTC+5:30 (IST)
- Pin Code: 415102
- Vehicle registration: MH-11
- Major Highways: NH-160

Mayani is a town in Satara district of Maharashtra state in India. It is situated on the National Highway NH-160 and Pandharpur - Malharpeth road SH-143. This town is well known for a notified Bird Conservation Reserve in 2021.

== Geography ==
This town is situated on the banks of Chand river, a tributary of Yerla river. It is 24 km away from Vaduj, tehsil headquarters of taluka and located in the southeastern part of Khatav taluka of Satara district. It is 20 km away from Vita in Sangli district. On 15 March 2021, the Government of Maharashtra notified the Mayani Bird Conservation Reserve in Mayani. This bird conservation site is located at old Mayani dam on Chand river.

== Contribution in Indian Freedom Struggle ==
Forest Satyagraha was an important phase of the Civil Disobedience Movement in which peasants played a significant role. Those who could not take part in Salt Satyagraha sufficiently due to lack of sea-coast threw themselves fully into Forest Satyagraha. A series of forest Satyagrahas occurred in Satara district during the Civil Disobedience campaign. Forest Satyagraha took place at Kameri, Tambave, Retharedharan, Kale, Peth, Shirala, Kavathe, Prachitgad, Lohare, Belmachi, Mayani, Masur, Islampur, Vita, Bilashi, etc. places. Forest Satyagraha at Bilashi deserves special mention. At Mayani in Khatav Taluka Forest Satyagraha was brought about on 4 August 1930 in which 12 persons, including Shri Jagannath Nanaji Dhavalikar, C.D. Dashputre, Y.B. Kuber, P.H. Pore were arrested and sentenced to six months imprisonment and different amounts of fine.

== Economy ==
The major economic activities in this town are based on agriculture, textile processing and manufacturing. Due to prolonged drought, rainfed farming is practised in this area. Many years ago, this town emerged as a centre for the cottage industries of handlooms and textile weaving in Satara district.

== Notable people ==
- Mohanrao Alias Bhausaheb Pandurang Gudge (Ex-MLA). He was educationist and also former deputy chairman of Maharashtra Krishna Valley Development Corporation.
- Dr. Diliprao Murlidhar Yelgaonkar (Ex-MLA)

At Mayani in Khatav Taluka Forest Satyagraha was brought about on 4 August 1930 in which 12 persons including Shri Gopal Dhondo Dashputre, Y.B. Kuber, P.H. Pore were arrested and sentenced to six months imprisonment and different amounts of fine.
