= Diskal =

- Village
- Location in Maharashtra, India
- Coordinates: 17.8138171°N 74.291193°E
- Country: India
- State: Maharashtra
- District: Satara
- Taluka: Khatav
- Taluka H.Q.: Vaduj

Government
  - Body: Gram Panchayat

Population (2011)
  - Total: 4,472
- Demonym(s): Diskalkar, Satarkar

Languages
  - Official: Marathi
- Time zone: UTC+5:30 (IST)
- Pin Code: 415504
- Vehicle registration: MH-11

Diskal is a village in the Satara district of the state of Maharashtra in India. It is situated on the Pusegaon-Phaltan road in Khatav taluka.

== Geography ==
Yerla river flows through this village and its source is 8 km away from there. This town is 44 km away from its district headquarters, Satara. It is 32 km away from Phaltan and 115 km away from Pune.

== Education ==
This village has facility of education up to matriculation and there are following educational institutions:

- Z.P. Primary School, Diskal
- SHREE SHIVAJI VIDNYALAYA, DISKAL

== Contribution in Indian Independence Movement ==
The people of Diskal village have contributed to the freedom movement of India. Some of them are mentioned below:

- SHANKAR BHAU MADANE: He participated in Quit India Movement of 1942. He helped and sheltered the underground activists of the Quit India Movement. For that he had to serve 6 months imprisonment.
- GANPATI APPA KARNE: During World War-II (1939–1945), he joined the Azad Hind Fauj to fight against British rule.

== 1894 Hailstorm Incident ==
On 6 February 1894, at about 2 to 3 pm heavy rain commenced accompanied with hailstones, many of which were as big as large mango. The rain lasted for about 5 hours. The fall of hailstones, although it lasted for an hour or so, was so heavy and incessant that the accumulation of the stones rose to a height from 4 to 6 feet and it took 10 to 11 days to thaw. Six person fell victims to this occurrence. The bodies of 5 of them were buried under ice. The sixth, a boy of 11 years, was carried away by the force of the flood to the Ner dam on Yerla river and was lost. About 835 cattle are also said to have been lost. Crops of Bakshi and Khapli wheat have been completely damaged. The loss suffered by the people of village was apparently very serious.
