= Nandani River =

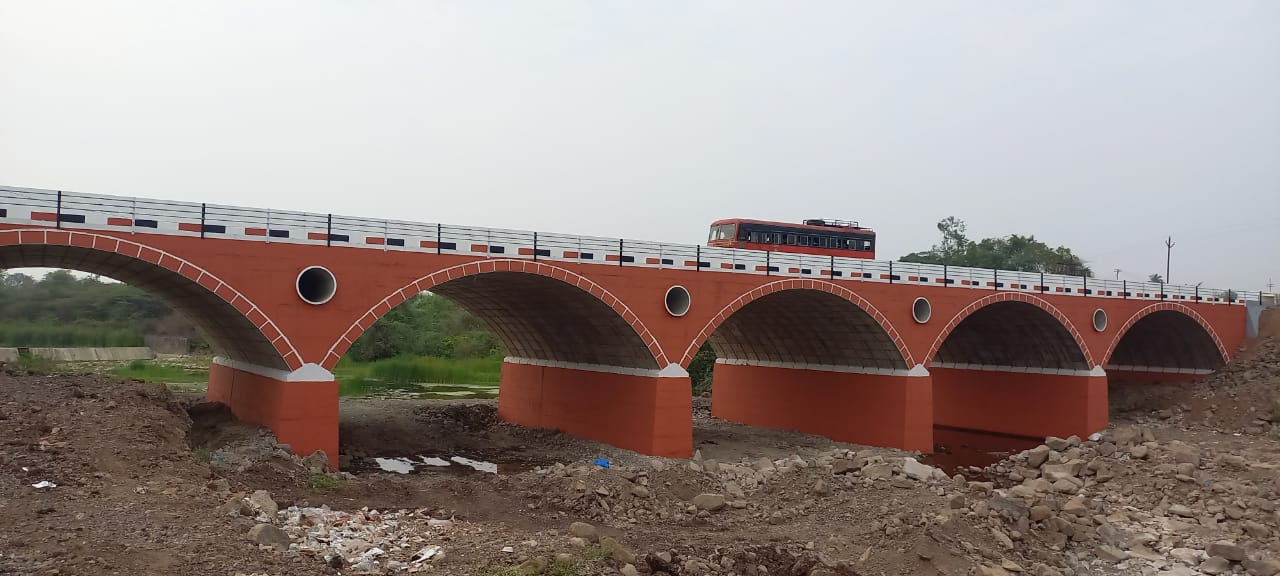
- Amrapur Bridge on Nadnai River in Kadegaon taluka of Sangli district

Location
- Country: India
- State: Maharashtra
- Region: Western Maharashtra
- District: Satara, Sangli

Physical characteristics
- Source: Jaigaon (Near Aundh)
  - location: Khatav Taluka, Satara, Maharashtra, India
  - coordinates: 17°57′07″N 74°24′37″E
  - elevation: 914 m (2,999 ft)
- Mouth: Yerala River
  - location: Shivani, Kadegaon Taluka, Sangli, Maharashtra, India
  - coordinates: 17°25′18″N 74°42′00″E

The Nandani River is a right tributary of Yerla River in India. It originates at Jaigaon and flows from Aundh in Satara district and its confluence to Yerala river occurs near Shivani village of Kadegaon taluka, in Sangli district of Maharashtra state.

== Course ==
Nandnai River basin located at upper Yerala river basin, a tributary of Krishna river basin India. The total length of Nandani river is 39 km. It starts from Jaigaon in Satara district at 914 m above MSL and confluence at 551 m above MSL near Shivani in Kadegaon Taluka, of Sangli district in Maharashtra.
