= Yetgaon =

Village in Maharashtra

- Interactive map of Yetgaon
- Country: India
- State: Maharashtra
- District: Sangli
- Taluka: Kadegaon

Yetgaon (Village ID 568462) is a village situated in Kadegaon taluka in Sangli district, in the Indian state of Maharashtra.

According to the 2011 census it had a population of 3337 living in 783 households.

The main business of residents is farming. It is in a low rainfall region.

Shri Dharmaraj Vidyalaya Yetgaon is the high school in Yetgaon. It is associated with Rayat Shikshan Sanstha, Satara.

== Culture ==
God Shree Dharmaraj temple is in Yetgaon and people from adjacent villages go there for worship on a regular basis.

Among the many temples In Yetgaon are Vitthal-rukhmini temple, Mahadev temple, Khandoba temple, Satwai devi temple, Laxmi temple, Makhubai temple, Biroba Temple and Makhavati devi temple.

== Geography ==
It is about 14 kilometres (8.7 mi) north-west of Vita (a taluka place of Kadegaon). More than 5000 people live in Yetgaon. About 200 hectares of artificial forest is developed in Yetgaon. It is spread along the boundary of Yetgaon and towards Mhasurne (another village in Satara district) and Kherade (another village in Sangli district). Yerla river is the main river. It flows between Yetgaon and Hingangade.
