= Nagnathwadi =

- Village
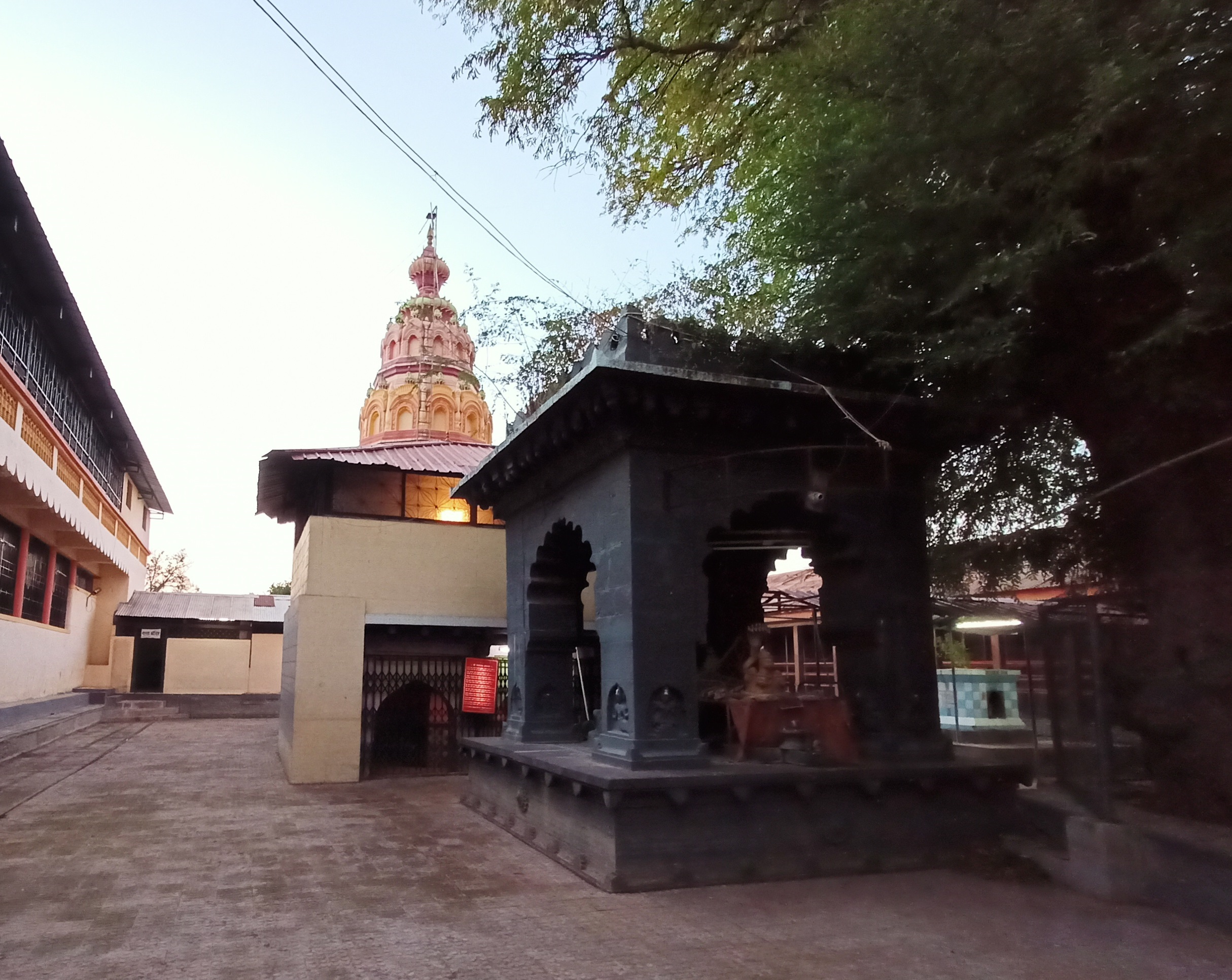
- Shri Nagnatha Temple, Nagnathwadi

- Location in Maharashtra, India
- Coordinates: 17.76912°N 74.29826°E
- Country: India
- State: Maharashtra
- District: Satara
- Taluka: Khatav
- Taluka H.Q.: Vaduj
- Nearest Town/Village: Lalgun

Government
  - Body: Gram Panchayat

Population
  - Total: 788

Languages
  - Official: Marathi
- Time zone: UTC+5:30 (IST)
- Pin Code: 415503
- Telephone Code: 02375
- Vehicle registration: MH-11

Nagnathwadi is a village near Lalgun in Satara district of Maharashtra state in India. It is known for the Lord Nagnatha Temple located on bank of Yerla river.

== History ==
During the time of Quit India Movement, a Parallel government (called Prati-Sarkar in Marathi) was formed in 1943 under the leadership of Krantisinh Nana Patil to fight against British rule. Many freedom fighters from Satara district had actively participated in the Prati-Sarkar movement. Ganpa Martanda Tambe alias Mali from Nagnathwadi was also involved in the Parallel Government Movement to fight against British rule.

== Geography ==
Nagnathwadi is situated on the bank of Yerla river and Ner dam is very close to its border.

== Shri Nagnatha Temple ==
Nagnathwadi is well known for Lord Nagnatha Temple, dedicated to Lord Shiva and Nag devtas. The Shivlinga in the temple is in water 31 feet deep from ground. Nagnath Yatra fair held every year in the month of Shravana in the Hindu calendar.

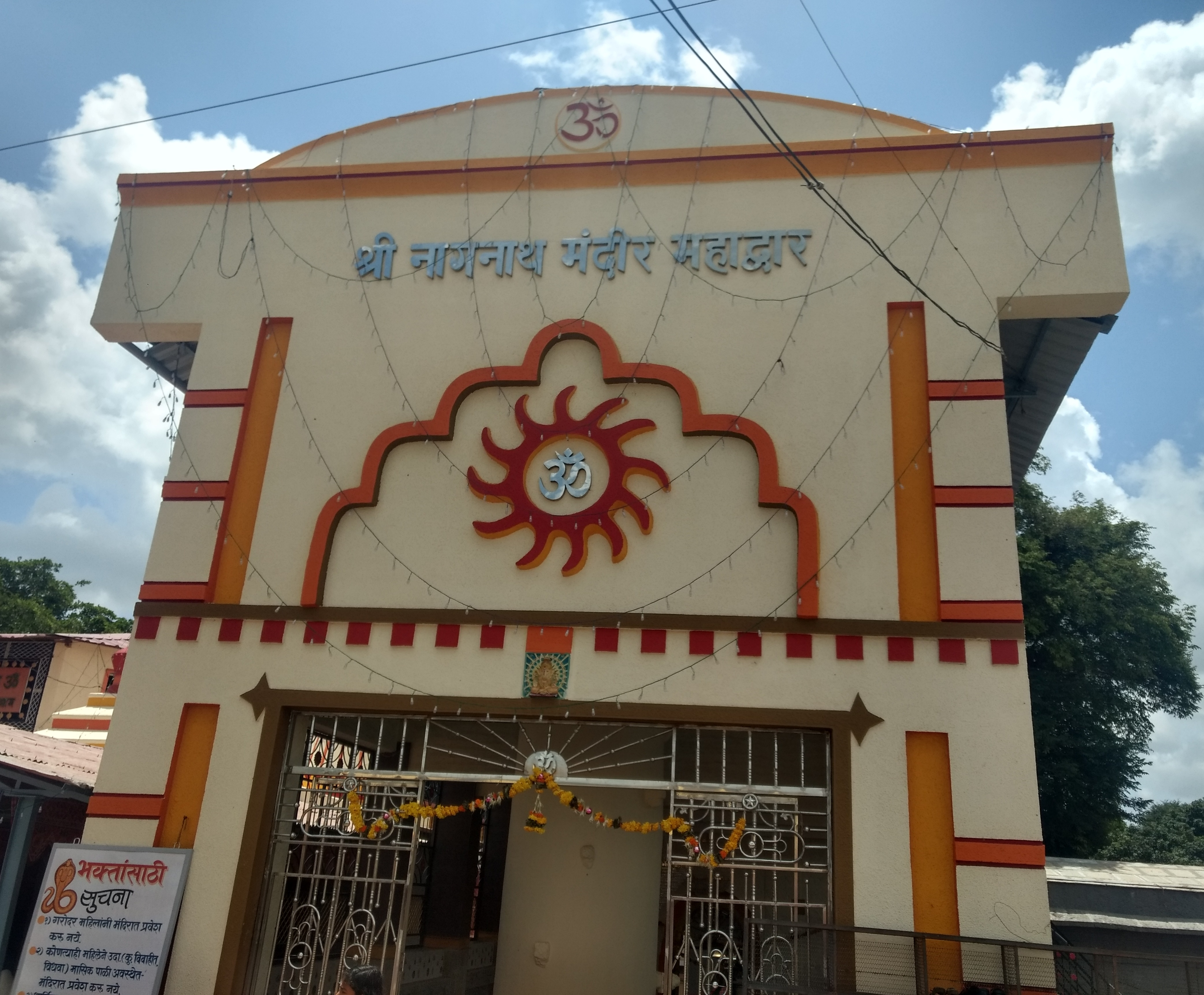
Shri Nagnatha Temple Mahadwar, Nagnathwadi

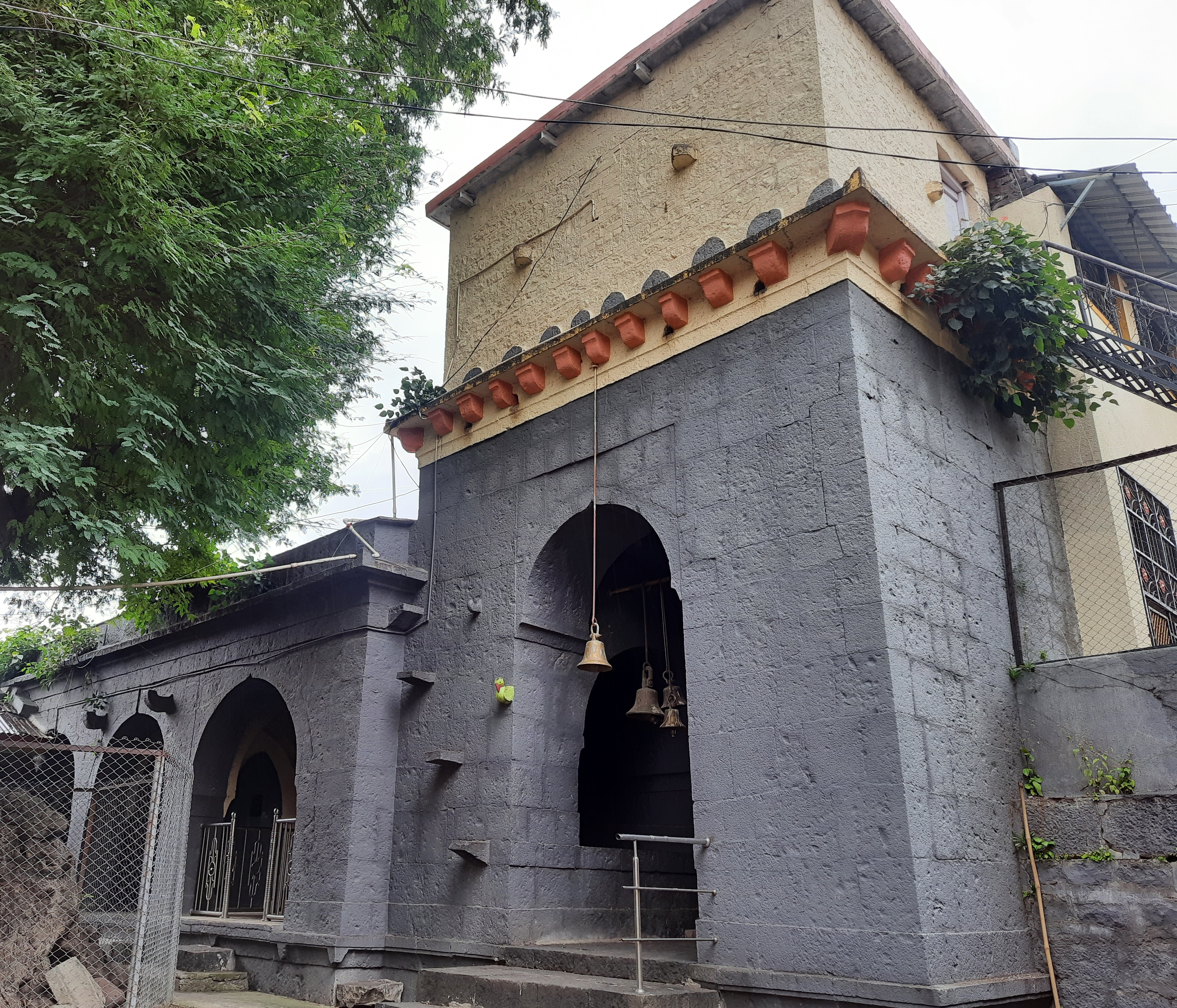
Nagarkhana- Shri Nagnatha Temple, Nagnathwadi

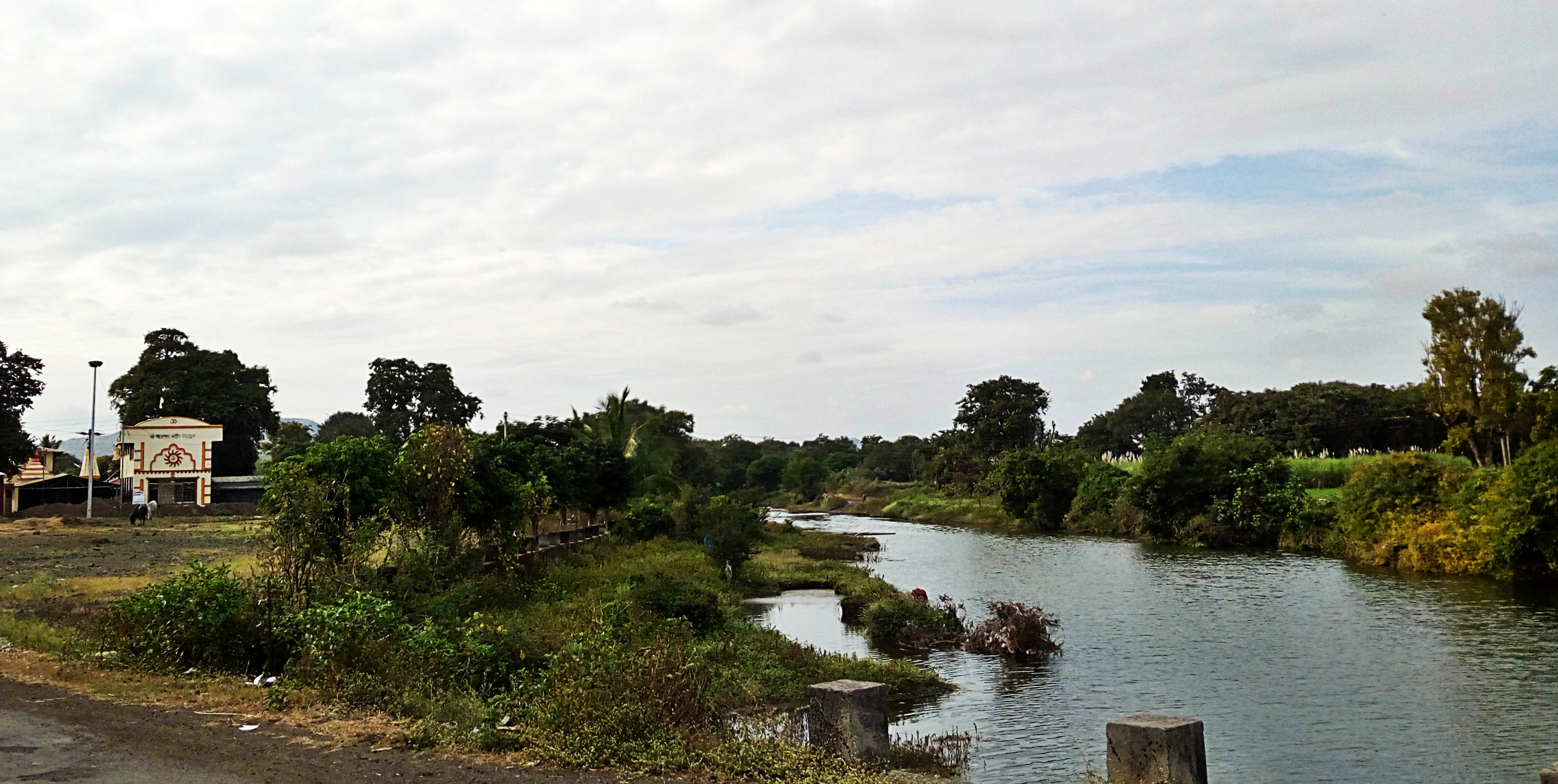
Yerla river next to Shri Naganatha Temple, Nagnathwadi
