= Katgun =

Village in Maharashtra

- Village
- Location in Maharashtra, India Katgun (India)
- Coordinates: 17.69°N 74.34°E
- Country: India
- State: Maharashtra
- District: Satara district
- Taluka: Khatav

Population (2011)
  - Total: 3,319

Languages
  - Official: Marathi
- Time zone: UTC+5:30 (IST)
- PIN: 415502

Katgun is a village in the Khatav taluka of Satara district in Maharashtra State, India.

== Notable personalities ==
- Mahatma Jyotiba Phule, the Indian activist, thinker, social reformer, writer and theologist was belongs to Katgun.

Jyothirao Govindrao Phule was born in 1827 into a family that belonged to the agricultural (Mali) caste, traditionally occupied as gardeners and considered to be one of the Shudhra varna in the ritual ranking system of Hinduism.[1] The original surname of the family had been Gorhe and had its origins in the village of Katgun, in present day Satara District, Maharashtra.

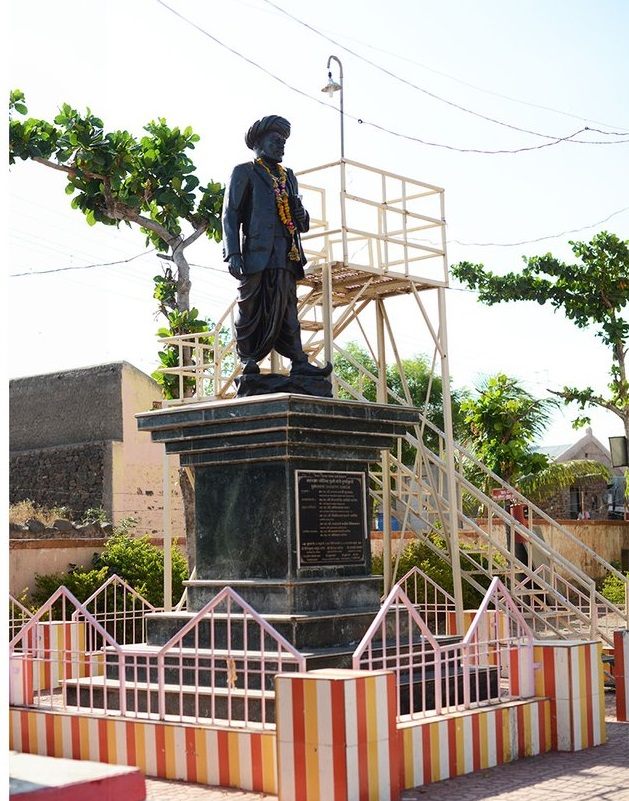
Mahatma Jyotirao Phule Smarak Katgun (Satara)

== Connectivity ==
Katgun is close to many larger towns including Vaduj, Satara.
