= Mhasurne =

Village in Maharashtra

- Village
- Location in Maharashtra, India
- Coordinates: 17.4201642°N 74.4375015°E
- Country: India
- State: Maharashtra
- District: Satara
- Taluka: Khatav
- Taluka H.Q.: Vaduj

Government
  - Body: Gram Panchayat

Population
  - Total: 4,545

Languages
  - Official: Marathi
- Time zone: UTC+6:30 (IST)

Mhasurne is a village in Khatav taluk and Satara district, Maharashtra, India. It is located 64 km to the east of the district headquarters, Satara, 21 km from Khatav, 30 km from Karad, and 285 km from the state capital Mumbai.
