= Mayani Bird Sanctuary =

Bird sanctuary in India

Coordinates: 17°25′N 74°30′E

Mayani Bird Conservation Reserve, Mayani
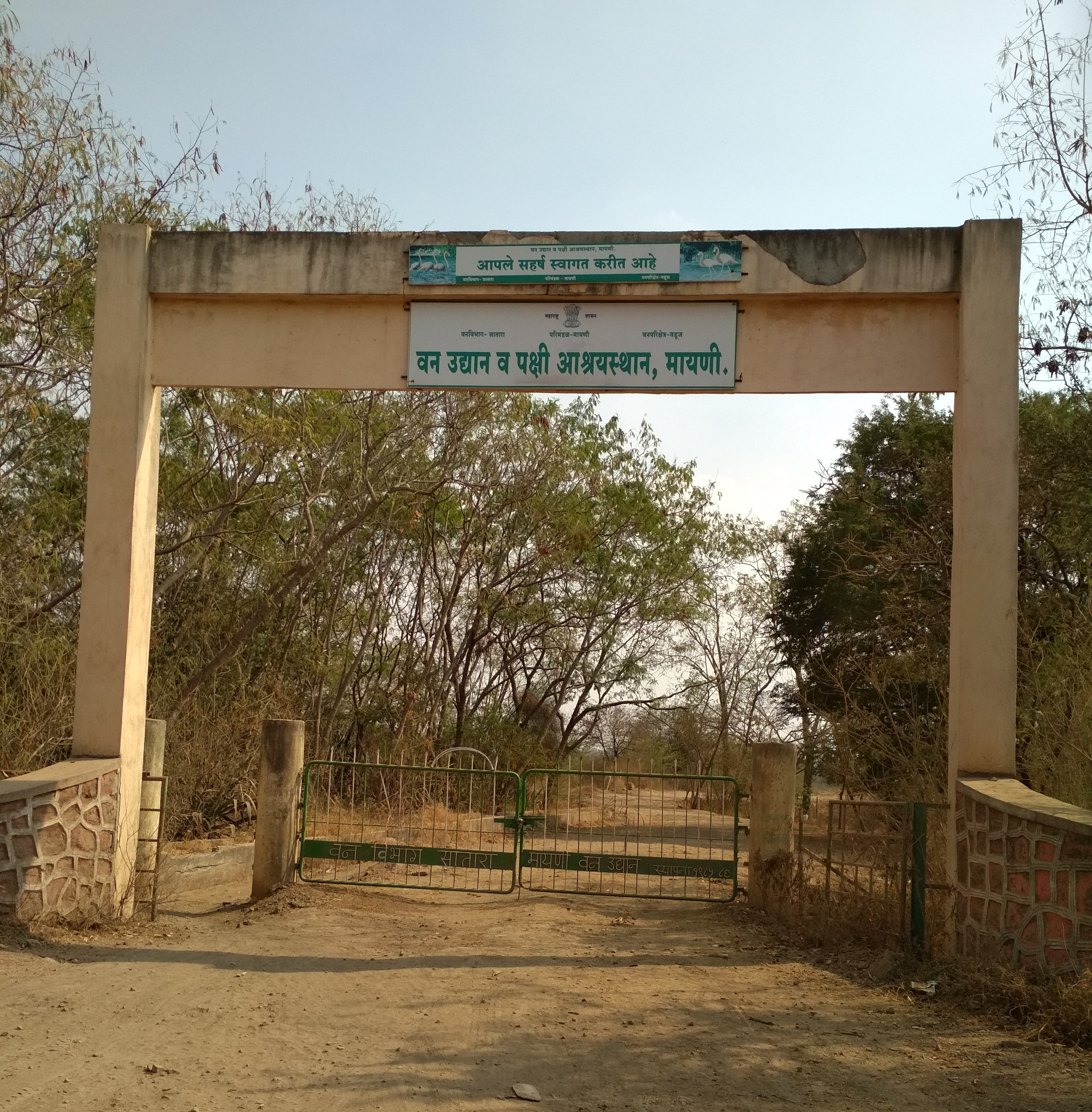
- Mayani Bird Conservation Reserve, Mayani
- Interactive map of Mayani Bird Conservation Reserve, Mayani
- Location: Mayani, Satara, Maharashtra India
- Nearest city: Vaduj
- Area: 8.67 square kilometres (3.35 sq mi)
- Established: 15th March 2021
- Governing body: Maharashtra State Forest Department

Mayani Bird Conservation Reserve is located in Mayani, Vaduj Forest Range of Satara Forest Division of Satara district. It came into existence with the notification WLP1220/CR-246/F-1 dated 15 March 2021. It is about 71 km from Satara.

== Area ==
Mayani Conservation Reserve is of 866.75 hectares (8.67 km^{2}.) and it is spread over 6 villages of Vaduj taluka namely Mayani, Kankatre, Ambavade, Nadval, Yeralwadi, Banpuri.

== Mayani Dam (Talav) ==
The Mayani bird sanctuary is established on an old dam.

Birds like the northern shoveller, stork and kingfisher can be found at the sanctuary. Other resident and migratory bird species in the winter season include: coot, brahminy duck, black ibis, painted stork, common spoonbill, etc.

Mayani Bird Sanctuary is studied as a typical wetland ecosystem which is rich in flora and fauna.
