= Lalgun =

Village in Maharashtra, India

- Village
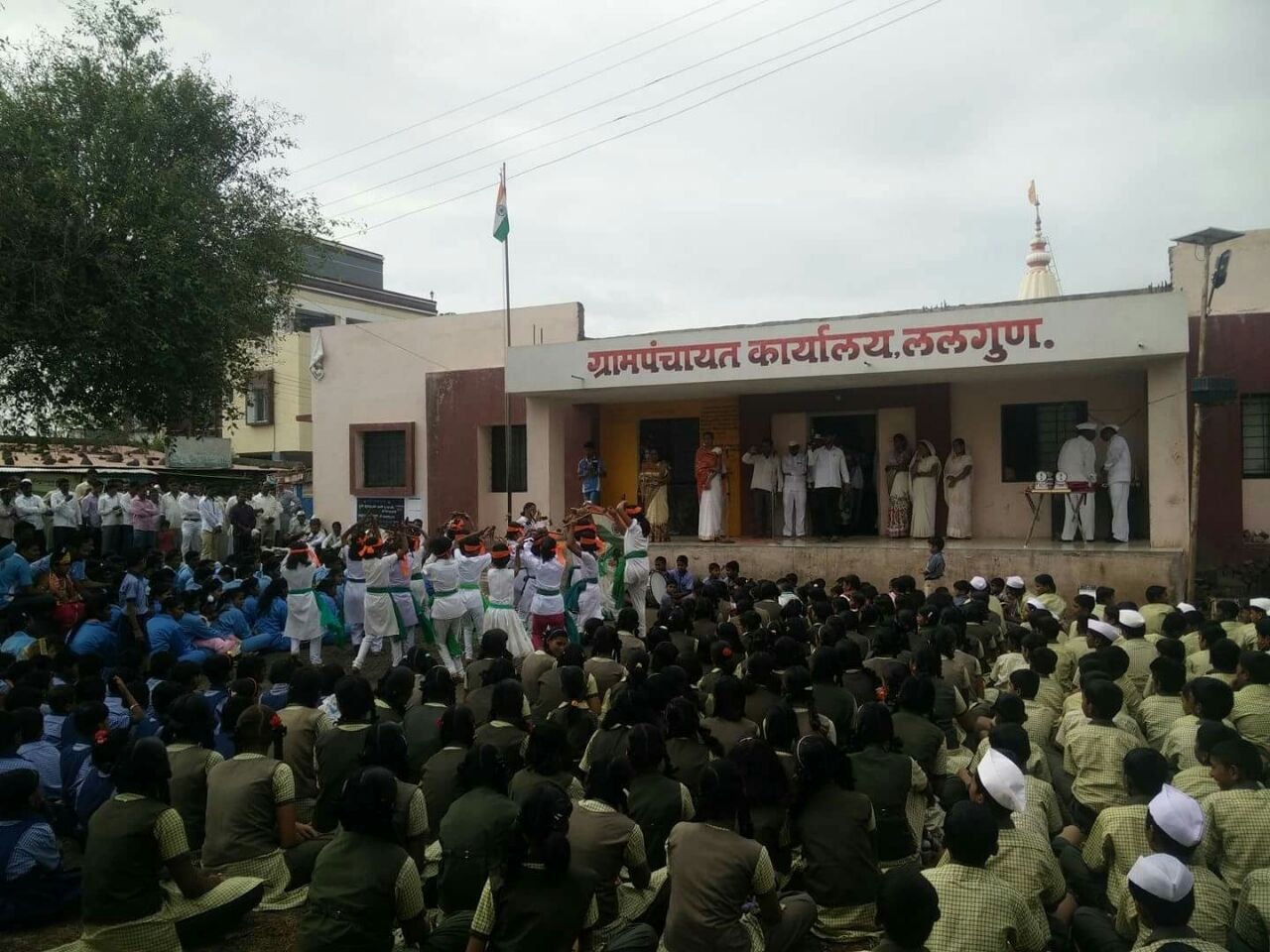
- Independence Day Celebration Lalgun-2021

- Location in Maharashtra, India
- Coordinates: 17.77981°N 74.29380°E
- Country: India
- State: Maharashtra
- District: Satara
- Taluka: Khatav
- Taluka H.Q.: Vaduj

Government
  - Body: Gram Panchayat
  - Sarpanch: Smt. Pooja Vijay Bhosale
  - Upsarpanch: Shri. Yuvraj Shantaram Ghadge
- Elevation: 832 m (2,730 ft)

Population
  - Total: 2,930
  - Literacy: 83.72%
- Demonym: Lalgunkar

Languages
  - Official: Marathi
- Time zone: UTC+5:30 (IST)
- Pin Code: 415503
- Telephone Code: 02375
- Vehicle registration: MH-11
- Major Highways: SH-147

Lalgun is a village in Khatav taluka of Satara district in the Indian state of Maharashtra, on Pusegaon-Phaltan State Highway (SH-147). It is part of the Koregaon Assembly constituency and Satara Lok Sabha constituency. Lalgun has a population of about 2930.

== Geography ==
Lalgun is located 17.779N, 74.294E, approximately 38 km east of Satara city and 120 km from Swargate (Pune). It has an average elevation of 832 metres (2,730 feet) and surrounded by mountainous region of the Sahyadri. Geomorphologically, Lalgun forms the part of Deccan Plateau, which is composed of basalt rock.

Lalgun is on the banks of the Yerla River, a tributary of the Krishna River.

== In popular culture ==
- Lalgun is the site of the Nagnath Yatra held annually in the month of Shravan.
- Lalgun is the site of the Jangi Kusti Maidan (Mega Wrestling event), which is held every year on the occasion of Vetalba Yatra in Baisakh (in the month of May)

== Gallery ==
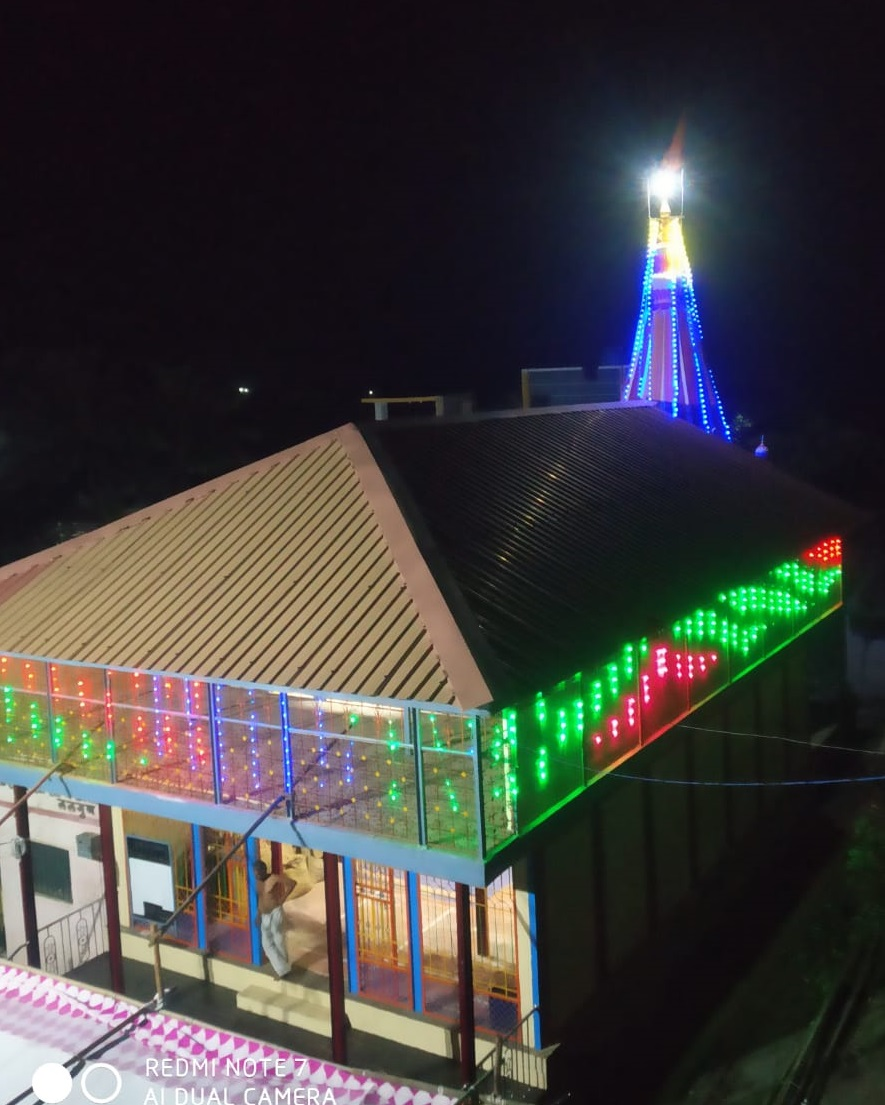
Shri Ram Mandir Lalgun

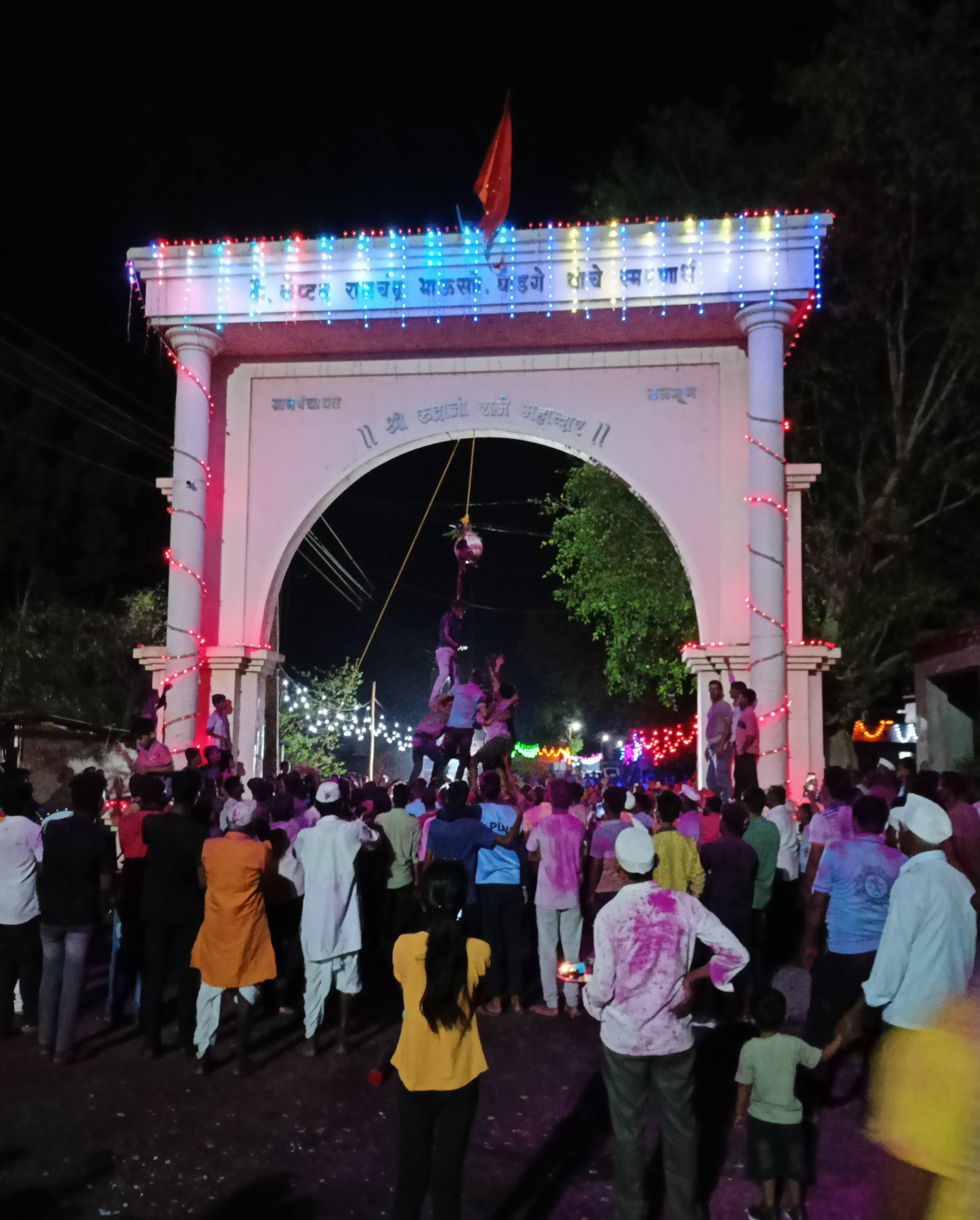
Dahihandi Celebration-Shri Rudraji Raje Mahadwar Lalgun

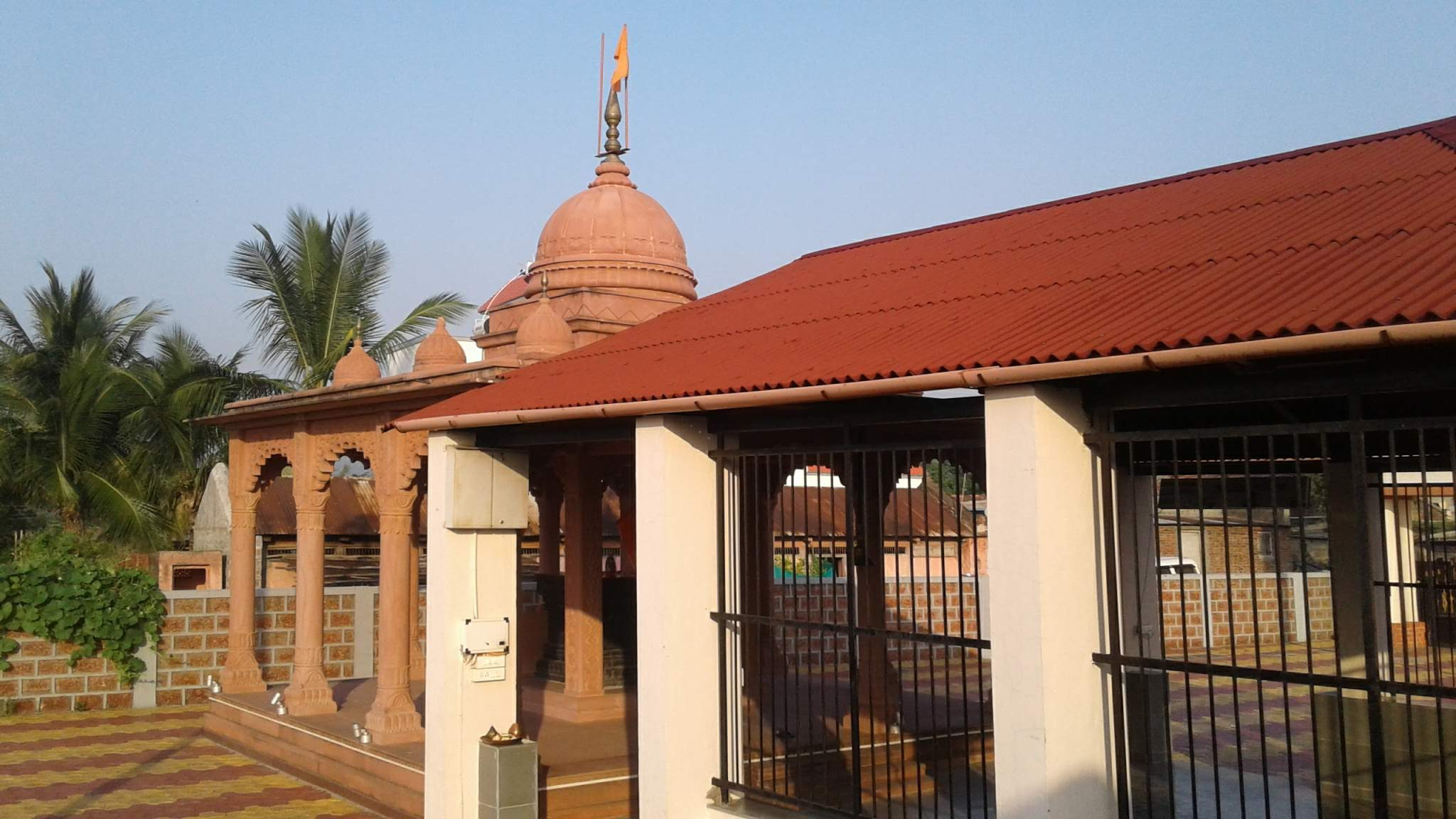
Shri Shampuri Maharaj Mandir Lalgun

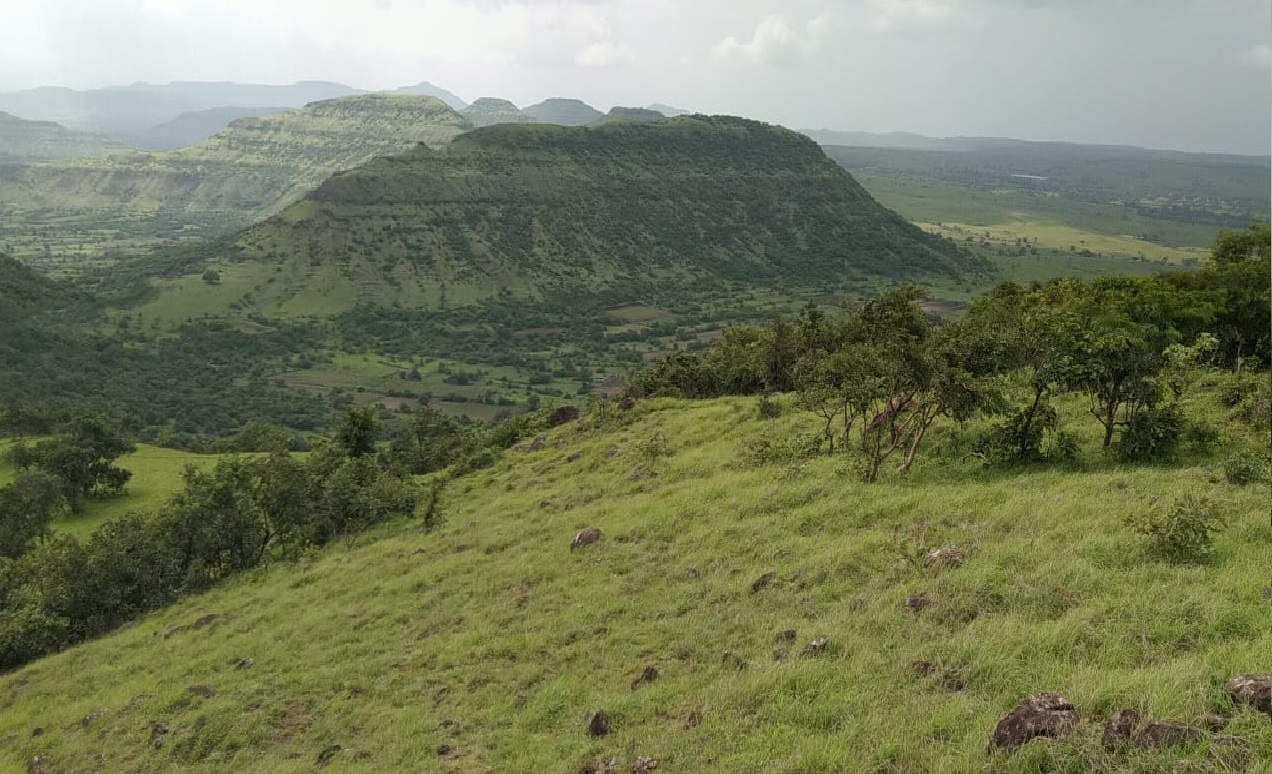
Mhaskoba Hills/Range
