= Pusegaon =

Pusegaon- a village in Satara, Maharashtra, India

- Town
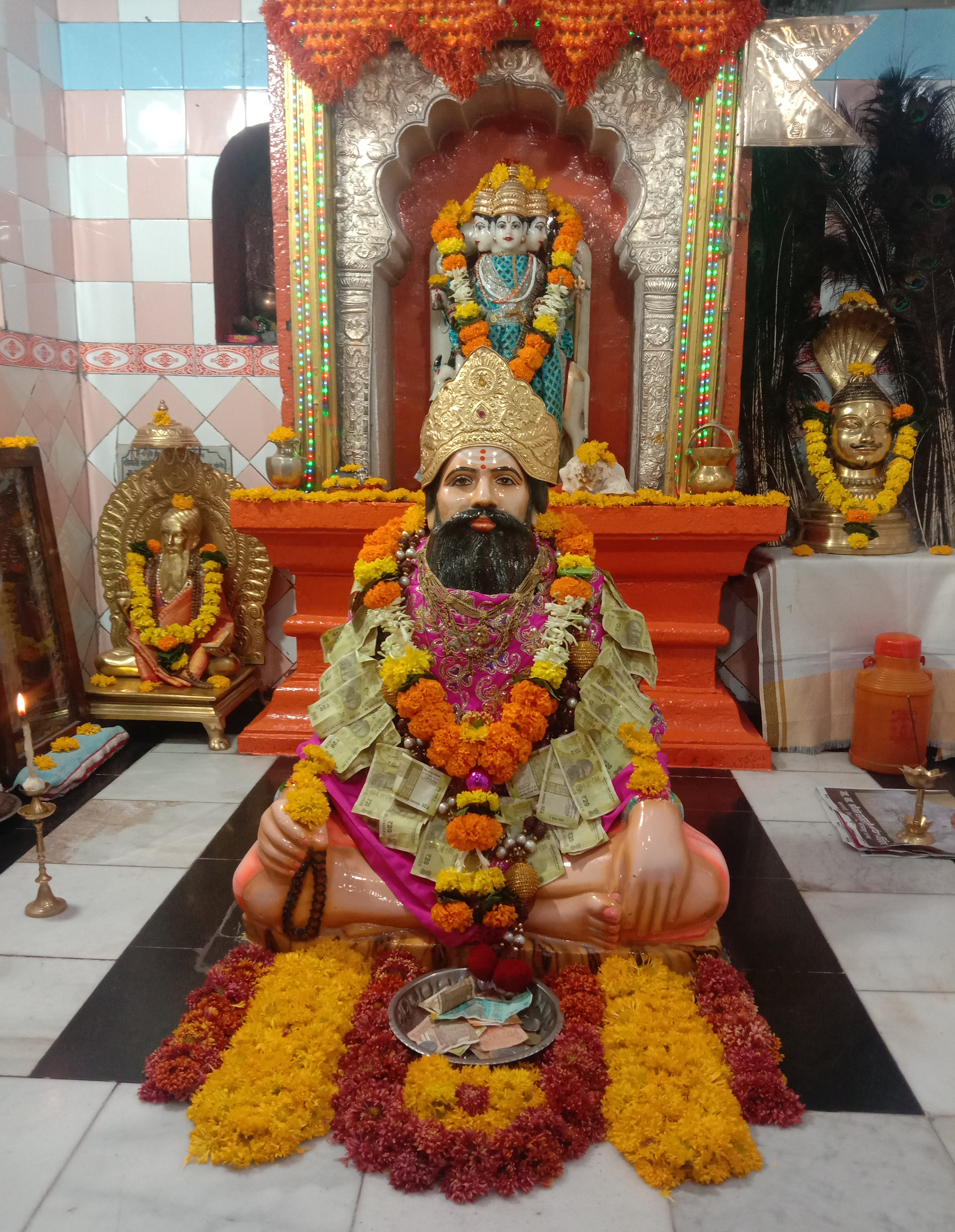
- Shri Sevagiri Maharaj Samadhi, Pusegaon

- Location in Maharashtra, India
- Coordinates: 17.7079947°N 74.3194084°E
- Country: India
- State: Maharashtra
- District: Satara
- Taluka: Khatav
- Taluka H.Q.: Vaduj

Government
  - Type: Gram Panchayat Pusegaon
  - Sarpanch: Deepali Suhas Muley

Population (2011)
  - Total: 9,180
- Demonym: Pusegaonkar

Languages
  - Official: Marathi
- Time zone: UTC+5:30 (IST)
- Pin Code: 415502
- Vehicle registration: MH 11
- Major Highways: NH-548C, SH-147
- Lok Sabha Constituency: Satara

Pusegaon is a town in the Satara district of the state of Maharashtra in India. It is situated on the NH-548C Satara-Baitul National Highway. Pusegaon is known for the Shree Sevagiri Maharaj Temple & its annual Rathotsava fair.

== Geography ==
Pusegaon is situated in the valley of Sahyadri mountain range and on the bank of Yerla River, a tributary of Krishna River. It is located 35km from its district headquarters Satara.

== Culture ==
- Pusegaon is famous for the Shree Sevagiri Maharaj temple located on the bank of the Yerla river. Shree Sevagiri Maharaj appeared in Pusegaon in 1905 and took Sanjivan Samadhi on 10 January 1948. Shri Sevagiri Maharaj's Rathotsav fair is held every year and many devotees from Maharashtra gather at the Rathotsav fair at Pusegaon.
- In 2021, the Department of Public Construction Work of Maharashtra set a world record in the Limca Book of Records for constructing a 40 kilometres (25 mi) road from Pusegaon to Mhasurne in 24 hours. The 39.65 kilometres (24.64 mi) stretch was built from 7am on Sunday, 30 May 2021, to 7am on Monday, 31 May 2021.

== Education ==
Pusegaon has facilities from primary education to higher education. Institutions in Pusegaon are listed below:

- Shri Hanumangiri Highschool, Pusegaon
- J. J. English Medium School, Pusegaon
- Rayat Shikshan Sanstha's Arts and Commerce College, Pusegaon
- Shaskiy Vidyaniketan, Pusegaon
