= Lakshmanrao Inamdar =

Indian Hindu nationalist (1917–1985)

Lakshmanrao Madhavrao Inamdar (19 September 1917 – 1985), popularly known as Vakil Saheb, is the founder of Sahkar Bharti. He was one of the founding fathers of the RSS in Gujarat. He is credited with inducting Indian Prime Minister Narendra Modi as an RSS balswayamsevak (junior cadet) and becoming Modi's political mentor.

== Inamdar and Narendra Modi ==
Inamdar is credited with shaping Narendra Modi's career in the RSS. When Modi became an RSS Pracharak, Inamdar was the Prant Pracharak of Gujarat. Modi and Inamdar are believed to have shared a special bond. According to Narendra Modi, Inamdar was the only person he has ever confided in on personal matters. Inamdar is also credited with persuading Modi to join a BA program in entire political science for which Inamdar procured the necessary study material.

Commenting on Modi's respect for Inamdar, Nilanjan Mukhopadhyay — author of a 2013 biography of Modi — says, "I haven't seen this kind of reverence in Modi for anyone, living or dead." Narendra Modi has co-written a 2001 published book, Setubandh, which is a biography of Inamdar. Modi's 2008 book Jyotipunj, on sixteen prominent RSS figures, also has a chapter on Inamdar. In Jyotipunj, Modi credited Inamdar with opening 150 RSS shakhas in 3–4 years—following the lifting of a 4-year ban on the RSS in 1952. Inamdar is also reportedly responsible for shaping Modi's views of relations between Hindus and Muslims.
