= Tambave =

Village in Maharashtra

- Village
- Interactive map of Tambave
- Country: India
- State: Maharashtra

Tambave is a small village located in the Satara district of Maharashtra state of India. It is located on Karad-Patan state highway. It is 14 km west to Karad City and nearly 49 km from Koyana Dam. Its name has been derived from the name of goddess 'Tamjai' . It is 4th largest village in Karad Tahsil with population of around 12,000 and is situated on the bank of Koyana river. Due to its population it has emerging political importance. Geographically, it is at the boundary of western Maharashtra & Konkan. Tambave is also known for its devotion in war of freedom. Tambave is situated in sugar zone of Maharashtra and the main occupation of village is farming that mainly include Sugarcane, wheat & groundnut. It has facilities of primary and secondary education. Tambave is first village in Maharashtra where 'AKSHAY PRAKASH YOJANA' (uninterrupted power supply) had successfully tested & implemented. Its name is also in focus due to frequent occurrence of leopard in civil area and farms.
