= Yerla River =

River in India

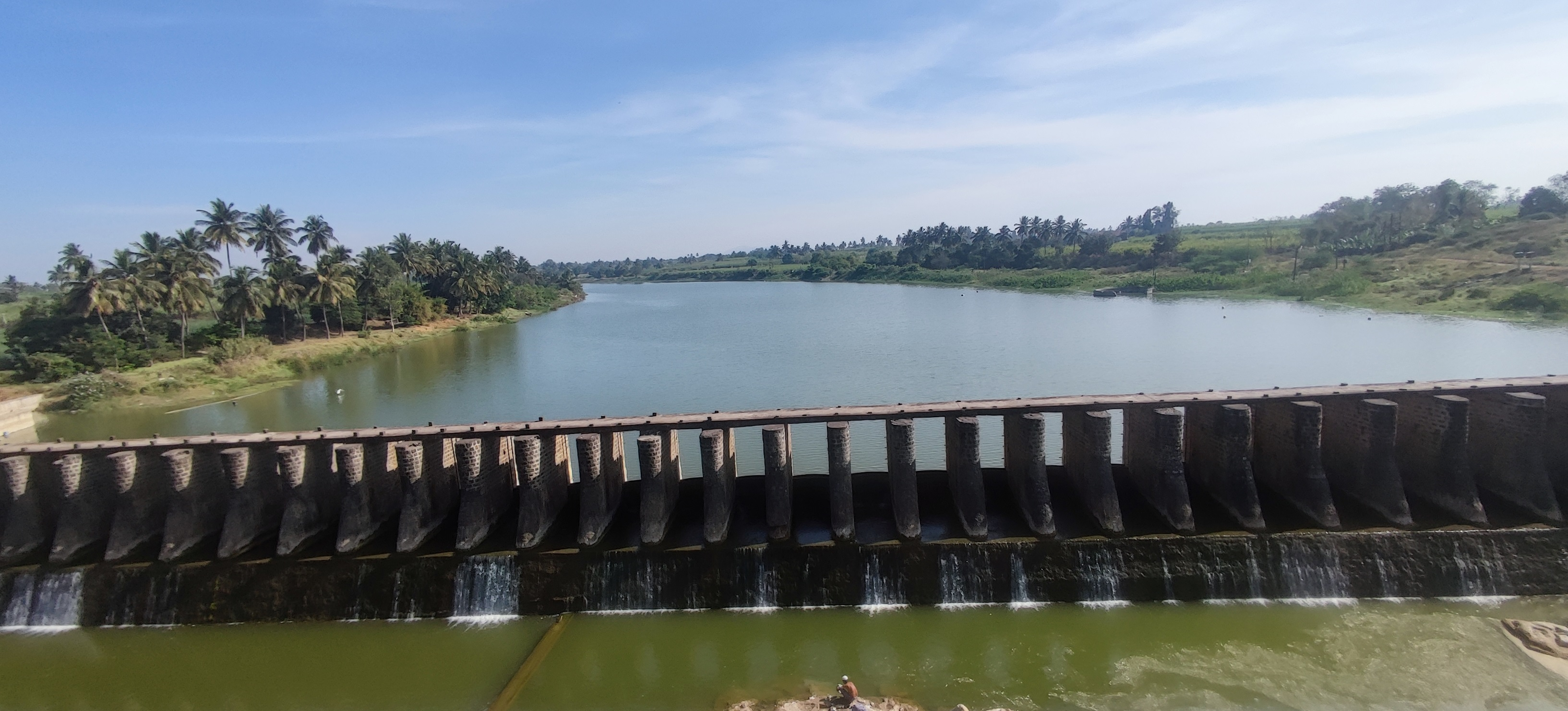
- Nandre Bandhara on Yerla River, Sangli

Location
- Country: India
- State: Maharashtra
- Region: South Maharashtra
- District: Satara, Sangli

Physical characteristics
- Source: Mhaskoba Hills, Manjarwadi
  - location: Khatav Taluka, Satara, Maharashtra, India
  - coordinates: 17°52′47″N 74°16′2″E
  - elevation: 947 m (3,107 ft)
- Mouth: Krishna River
  - location: Bramhanal, Sangli, Maharashtra, India
  - coordinates: 16°55′57″N 74°30′37″E

Basin features
- Tributaries
  - left: Bhagyaganga River, Chand River
  - right: Nandani River

The Yerla River, alternatively Yerala River, is a tributary of Krishna River. It originates from the Mhaskoba hills in the extreme north of Khatav taluka of Satara district in Maharashtra. It flows along a valley flanked by the Vardhangad range to its right and the Mahimangad range to its left and its total length is about 125 km. In Satara district, it passes through Mol, Lalgun, Pusegaon, Khatav, Vaduj and Nimsod. Later in Sangli district it joins Krishna River near Brahmanal. The Yerala is a nonperennial river. This river is a major source of irrigation in the eastern part of Satara district and Sangli district in Maharashtra and helpful for seasonal agriculture production. The drainage network influences the economic and social development of people.

== Places and temples ==
The first holy place on the river is Mhaskoba Temple, where the river originates. This temple is located near the village of Mol in the northern part of Khatav taluka. Flowing southeast, the river’s major attraction is the Nagnath Temple of Lord Shiva at Nagnathwadi near Lalgun. The river then enters the Ner Dam, which attracts seasonal migratory birds. In Pusegaon there is a famous temple of Shri Sevagiri Maharaj on the bank of the Yerala River. At Yeralwadi near Banpuri village the beautiful Yeralwadi dam is constructed on this river at the south of Vaduj. The region of Yeralwadi Dam is a birding hotspot in Satara district. Greater flamingoes, winter migratory ducks, waders have a great diversity in this region. Brahmanal in Sangli district has a beautiful confluence of river Yerala and river Krishna.

== Dams ==
- Near Ner village in Khatav taluka, Ner Dam is located on the upper side of Yerla River. It is the source of irrigation for the northern part of Khatav taluka.
- At Yeralwadi near Banpuri village the Yeralwadi dam is constructed on this river at the south of Vaduj.
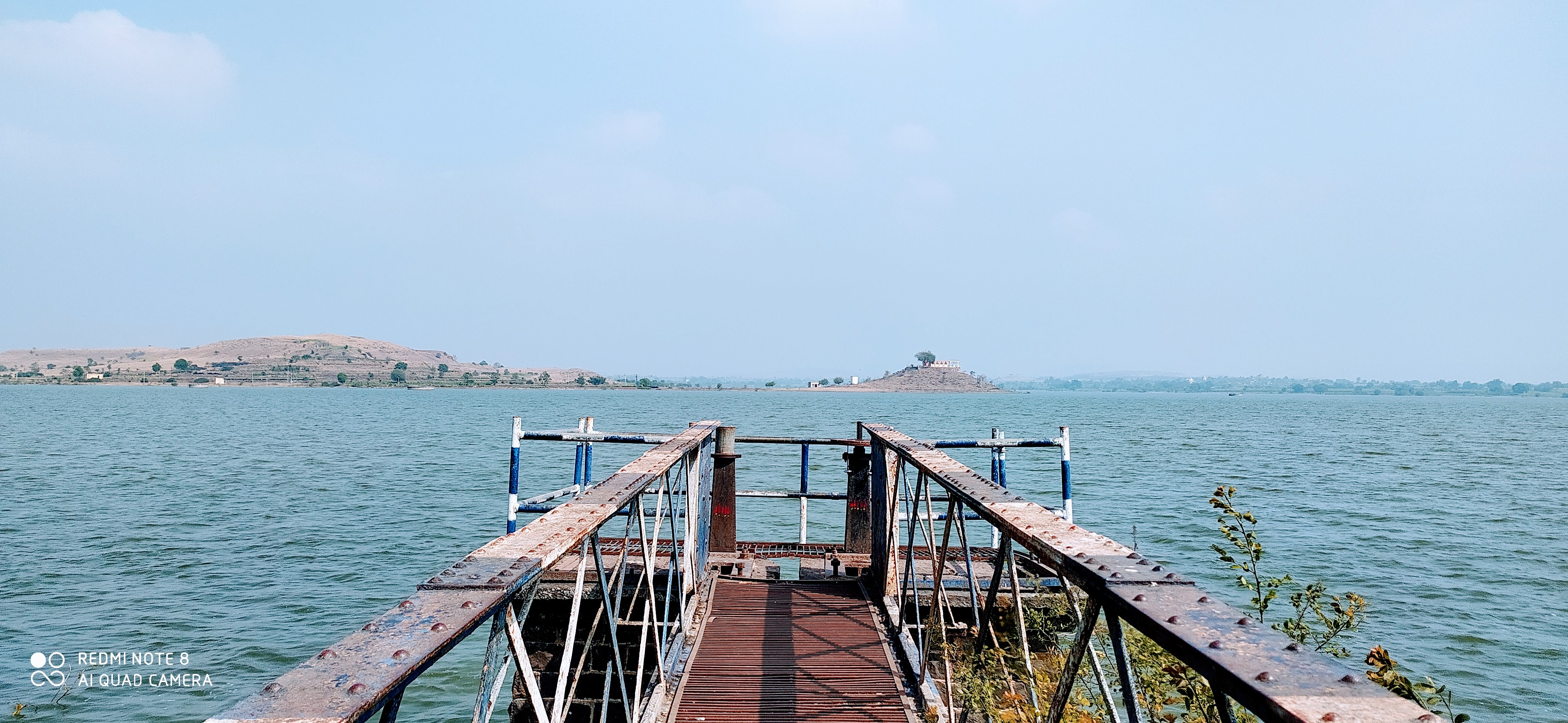
Ner Dam on Yerla River, Satara

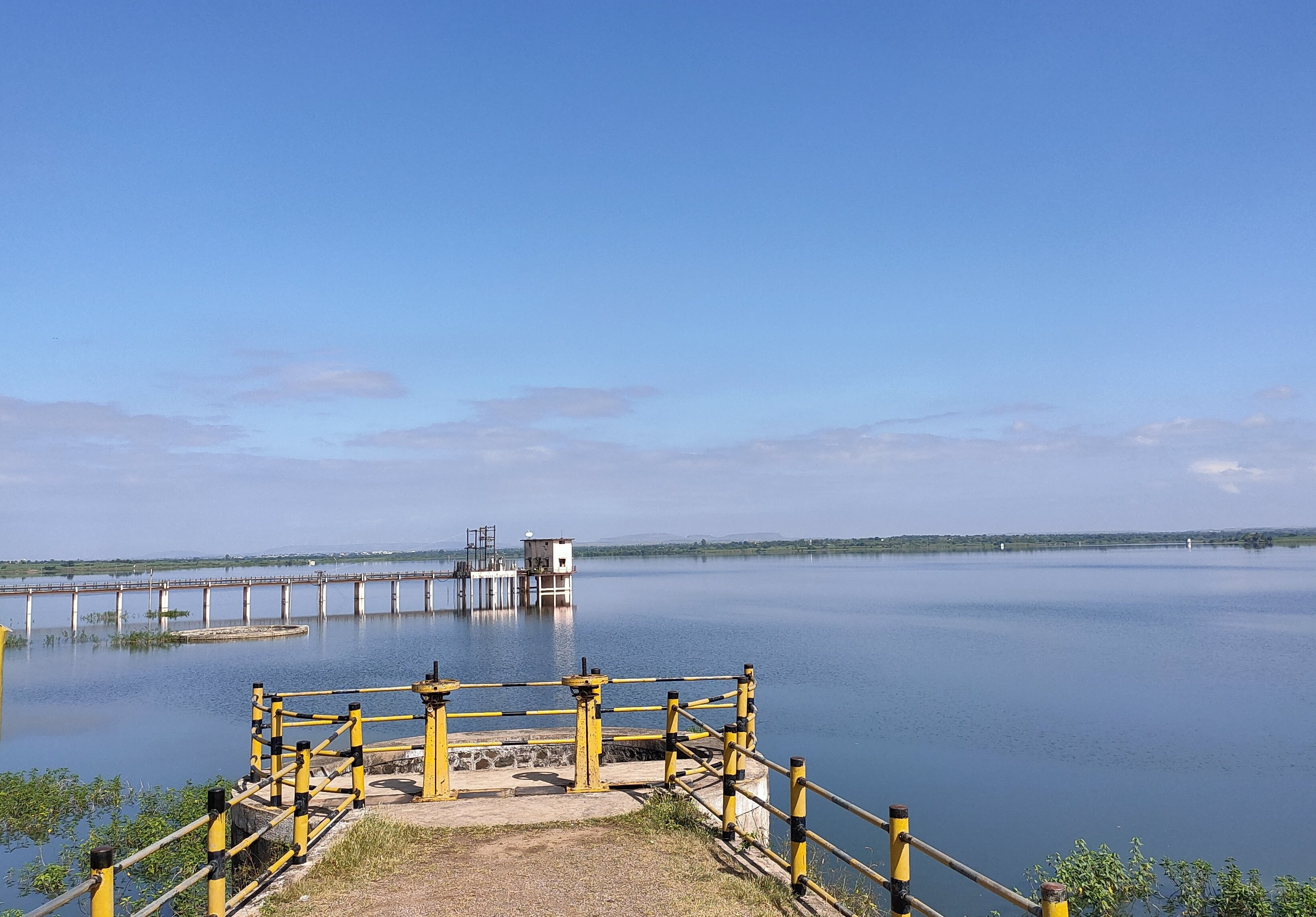
Yeralwadi Dam on Yerla River, Satara

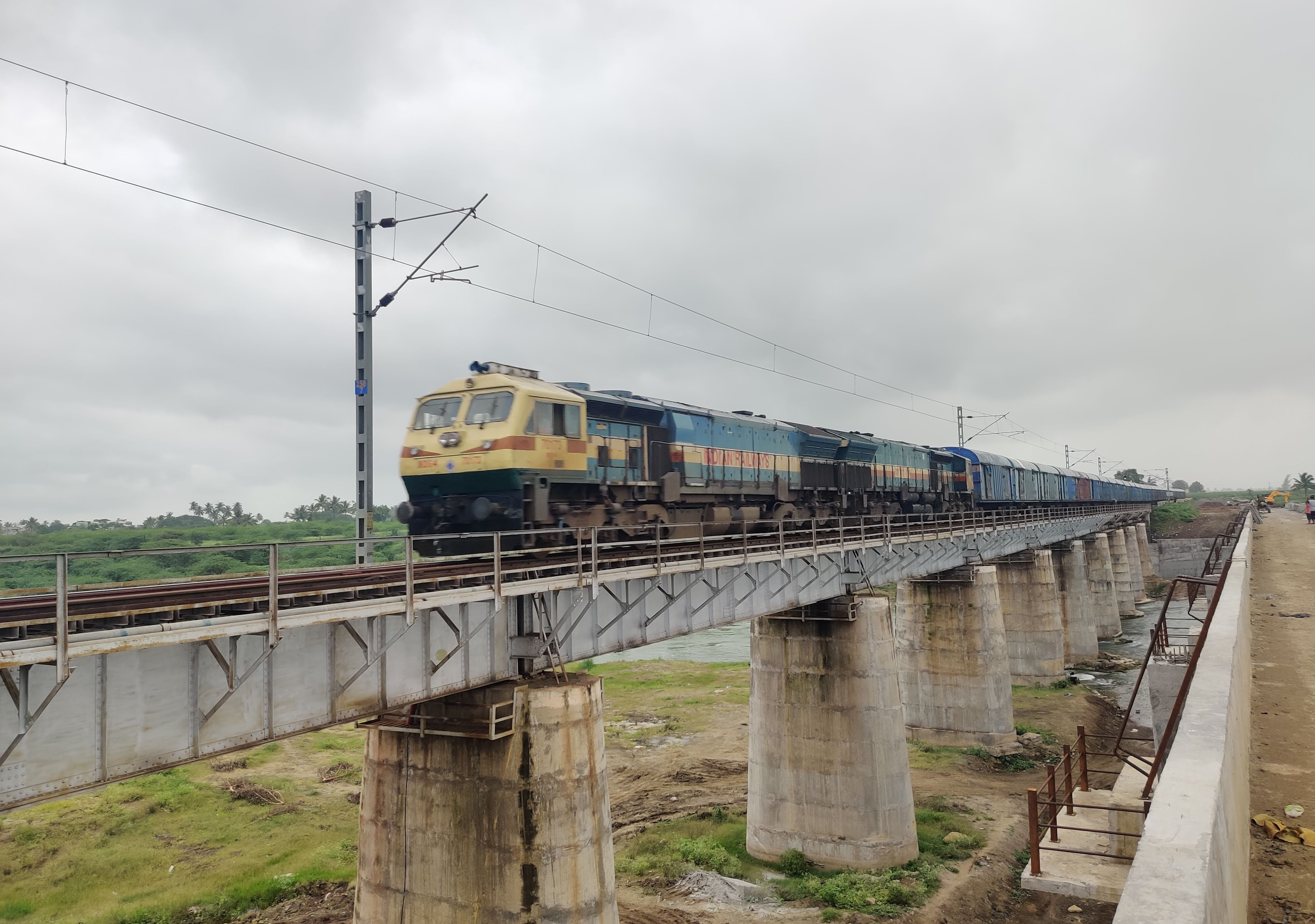
Nandre Railway Bridge on Yerla River, Sangli

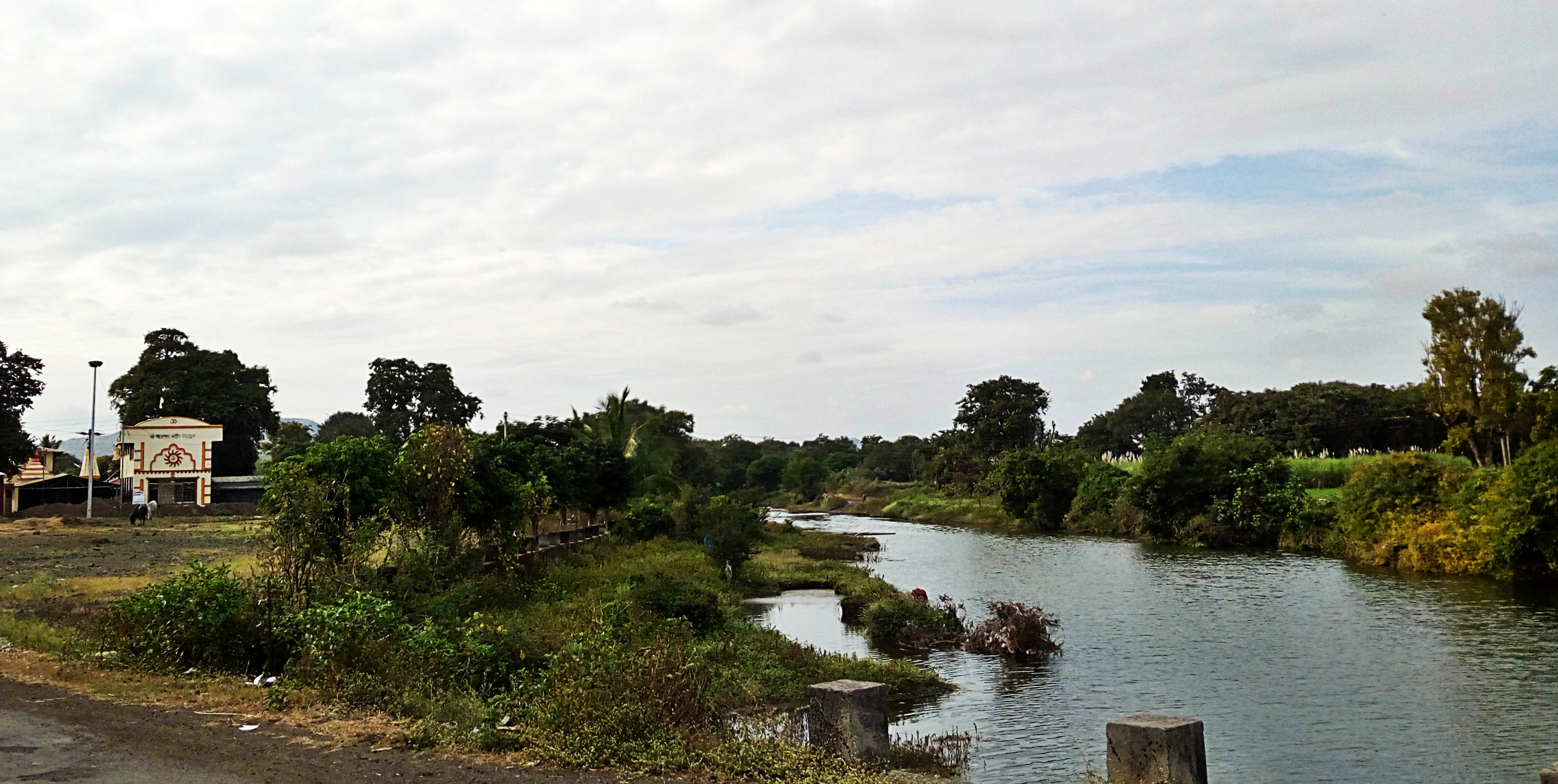
Yerla river next to Shri Nagnatha Temple, Nagnathwadi

Baliraja Dam, Balvadi (Bhalvani).
