= Vaduj =

Coordinates: 17°36′N 74°27′E

- City
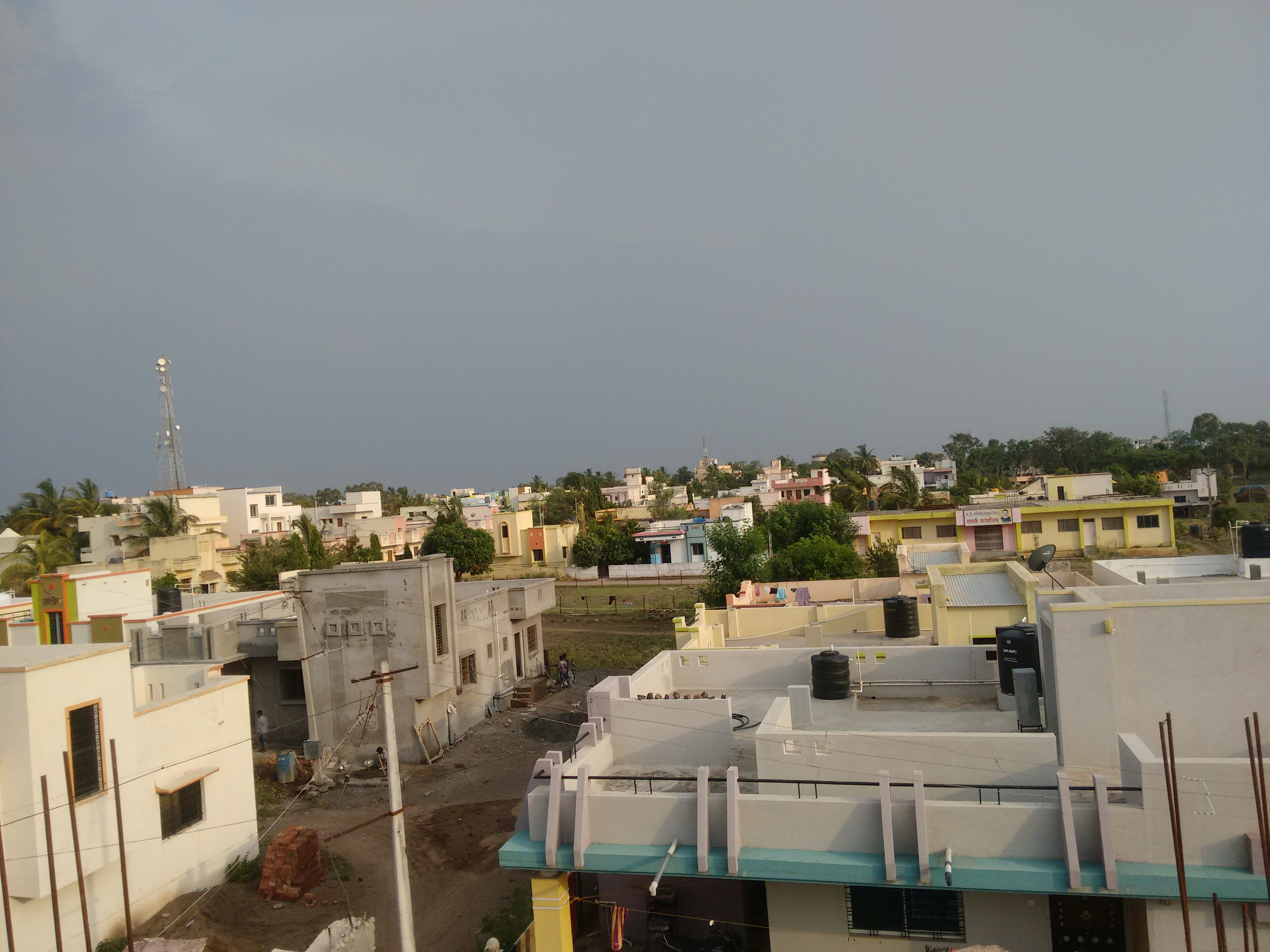
- Karmaveer Nagar, Vaduj

- Location in Maharashtra, India
- Country: India
- State: Maharashtra
- District: Satara
- Taluka: Khatav

Government
  - Type: Municipal Council
  - Body: Nagarpanchayat Vaduj
  - Municipal Chief Officer: Kapil Jagtap
  - Mayor: Manisha Kale

Population (2011)
  - Total: 17,636
- Demonym: Vadujkar (वडूजकर)

Languages
  - Official: Marathi
- Time zone: UTC+5:30 (IST)
- Pin Code: 415506
- Vehicle registration: MH-11

Vaduj is a town in Satara district of Maharashtra, India. It is the headquarters of Khatav Taluka. It is on the banks of the Yerala River, around 58 kilometres (36 mi) away from the district capital Satara, and 165 kilometres (103 mi) away from Pune. It is the largest town in Khatav Taluka, with a population of around 17,636 (registered ) people.
